= Valiant-class harbor tug =

Class of US Navy yard tugboats

Valiant-class tugboats
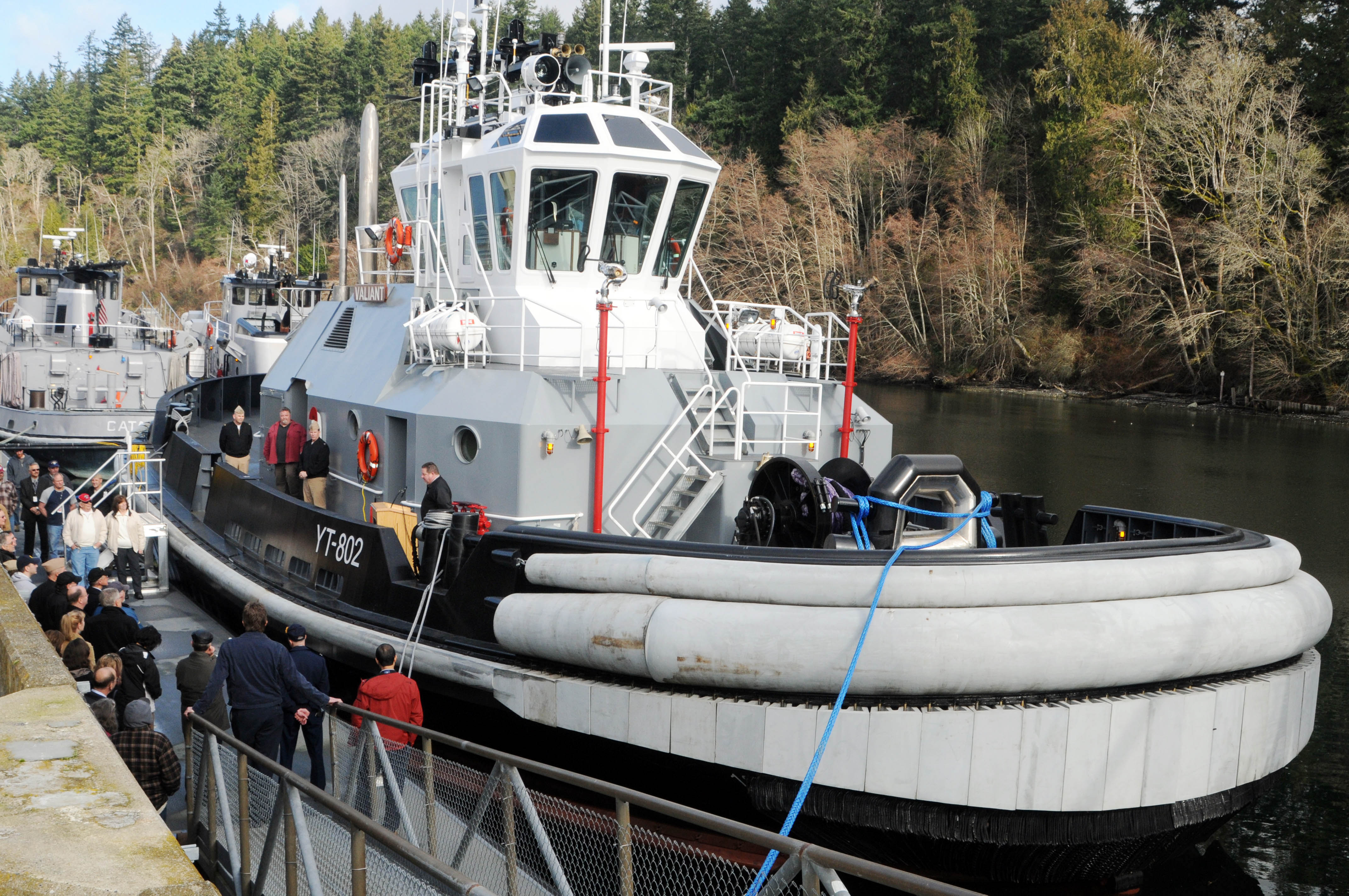
- Rob Campbell, deputy program director of Navy Region Northwest Port Operations, delivers remarks during the activation ceremony for Navy tugboat Valiant (YT-802)

Class overview
- Builders: J.M. Martinac Shipbuilding Corp., Tacoma, Washington
- Operators: United States Navy
- Preceded by: Natick-class tugboat
- Succeeded by: Rainier-class harbor tug
- Built: 2009–2012
- In service: 2009–present
- Planned: 6
- Completed: 6
- Active: 6

General characteristics
- Class & type: Valiant-class Tugboat
- Displacement: 453 long tons (460 t) (lt); 581 long tons (590 t) (full)
- Length: 90 ft (27 m) (LOL) 82 ft (25 m) (LWL)
- Beam: 38 ft (12 m)
- Draft: 14 ft (4.3 m)
- Installed power: 2 × Caterpillar 3512C at 1,800 hp (1,300 kW) each
- Propulsion: 2 × Schottel Model SRP 1012 z-drive
- Speed: 12.4 knots (23.0 km/h; 14.3 mph) (trial)
- Complement: 6

The Valiant class is a class of US Navy yard tugboats (YT) that entered service in 2009. These tugs are designed to provide ship assist, barge and general towing, and escort services.

== Design ==
Before committing to a new tug design, Navy Region Northwest upgraded two of the older Natick-class tugboats, Menominee (YTB-790) and Washtucna (YTB-826), with improved power systems and z-drive propulsion units. Experience with these and two other YTBs with improved winch and power equipment lead to the decision to build new tugs.

The Valiant class was designed by Robert Allan Ltd. and derived from their Z-Tech 6000 commercial tugboat design. The prime contractor for the first four class members was Pacific Tugboat Services of Long Beach, California. The builder was J.M. Martinac Shipbuilding Corp. of Tacoma, Washington.

Unlike previous classes of navy tugboats, the Valiant class employs z-drive propulsion units manufactured by Schottel. These SRP 1012 drive units can be turned through 360 degrees to provide thrust in any direction. The z-drive propulsion and the unique hull shape allow this class of tug to have roughly the same bollard pull ratings ahead, 92,500 lb (42 t), as astern, 99,205 lb (45 t). The z-drive propulsion units are powered by 1,800 hp (1,342 kW) Caterpillar Marine 3512C V12 diesel engines.

For towing, Valiant-class tugs are able to run stern-first using the JonRie InterTech hydraulic bow winch. This "tractor" mode of operation is accommodated with a stern profile that is higher than the bow profile.

An electric powered tug is being considered as a way for the Navy to reach its 2020 fossil fuel reduction goals.

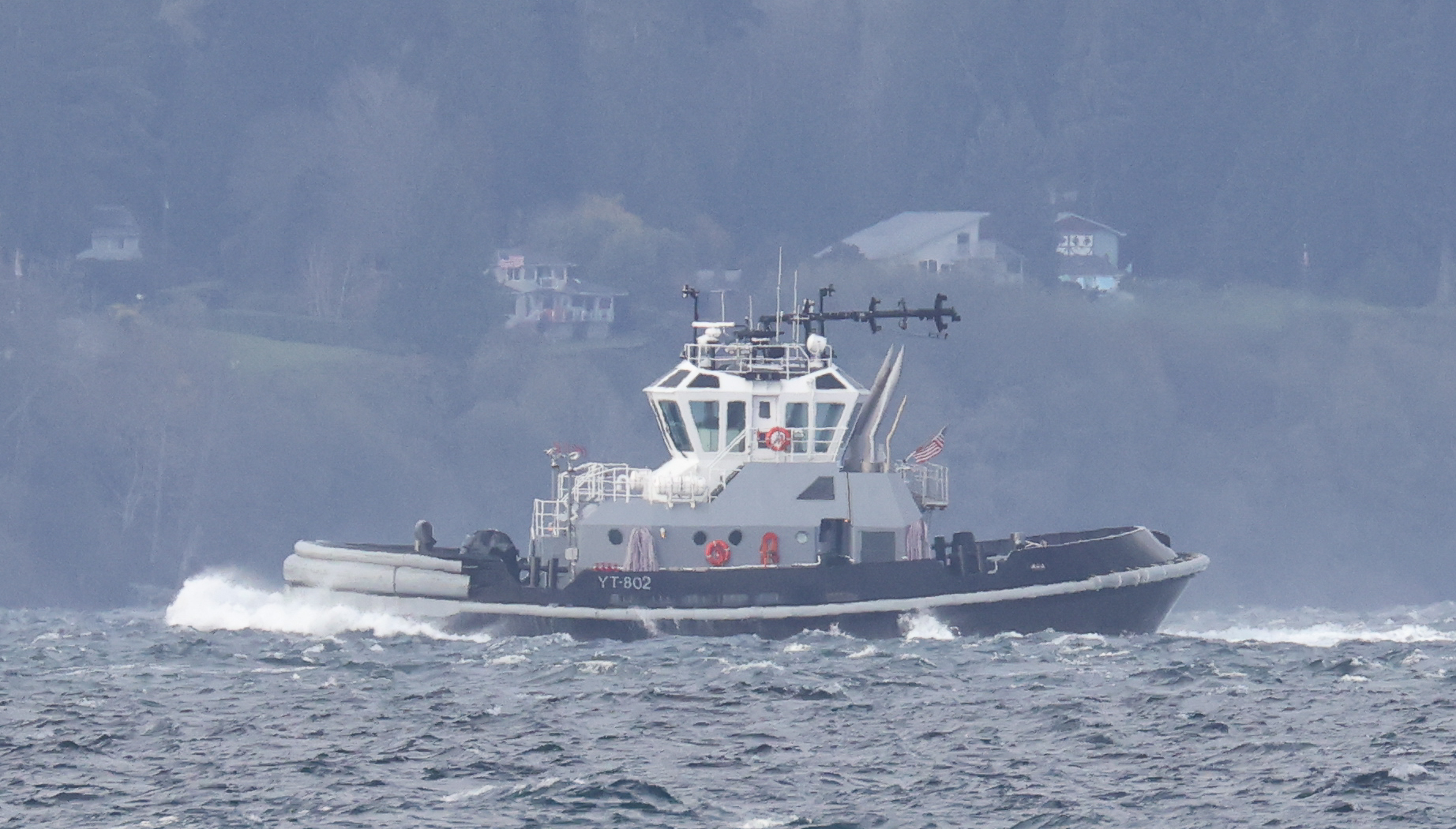
Valiant in Puget Sound in 2024

Valiant-class tugs have an extendable, pivoting brow for use when personnel transfers are required. There are four state rooms, 2 singles for the chief engineer and the tug master, and two doubles for the other crew members. There is also a galley and mess area. The deck house is well insulated to reduce vibration and sound levels in the accommodations areas. The pilot house is windowed all around.

== Ships in class ==
Valiant-class tugboats
Name	Launched
Valiant (YT-802)	25 July 2009
Reliant (YT-803)	21 November 2009
Defiant (YT-804)	10 July 2010
Seminole (YT-805)	6 November 2010
Puyallup (YT-806)	29 September 2011
Menominee (YT-807)	3 December 2011
