= Valiant (YT-802) =

Tugboat of the United States Navy

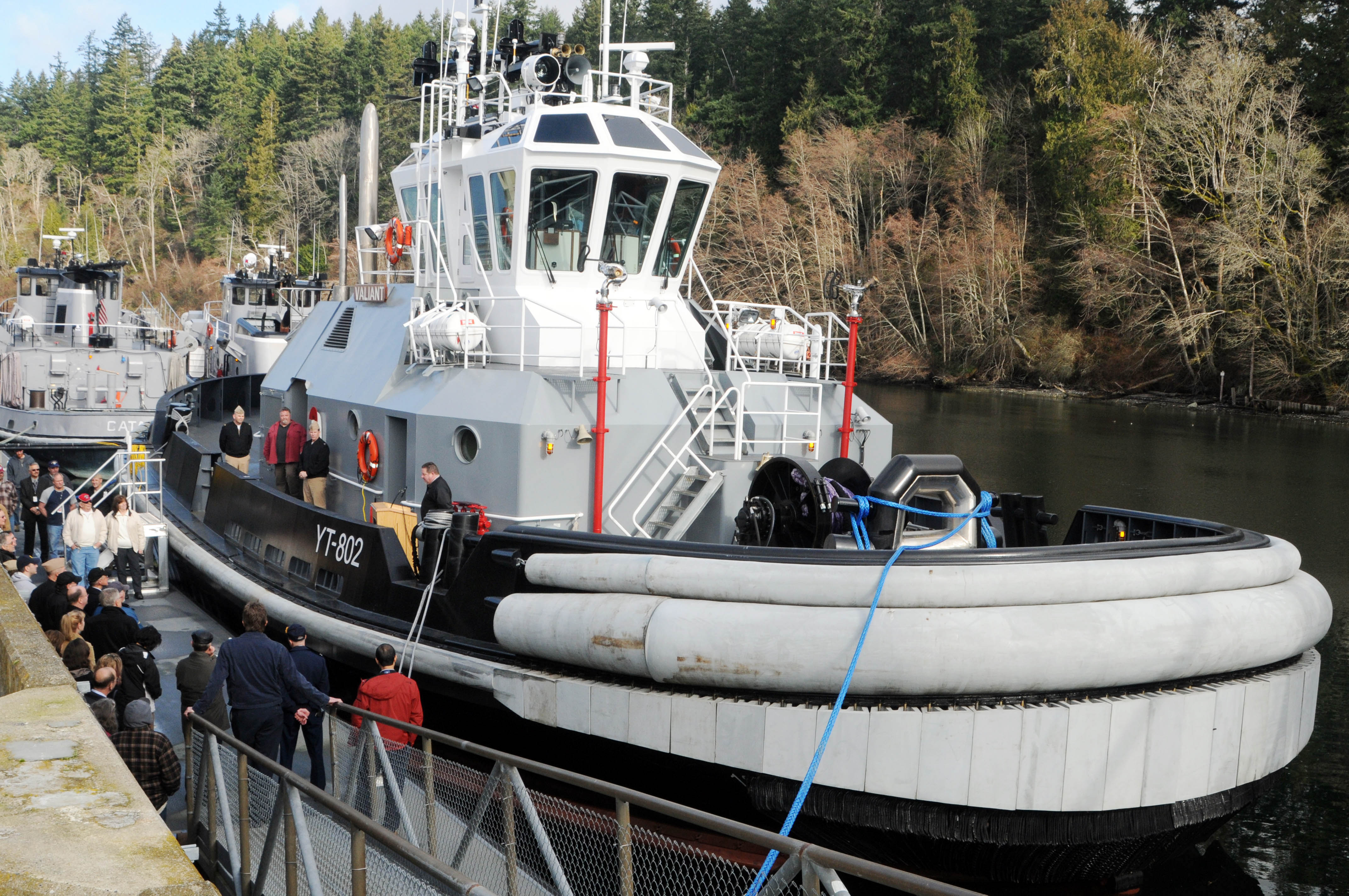
- Rob Campbell, deputy program director of Navy Region Northwest Port Operations, delivers remarks during the activation ceremony for Navy tugboat Valiant (YT-802)

History

United States
- Awarded: 10 September 2007
- Builder: J.M. Martinac Shipbuilding Corp.
- Yard number: 248
- Launched: 25 July 2009
- Acquired: 21 January 2010
- In service: 9 February 2010
- Identification: IMO number: 8744303
- Status: Active

General characteristics
- Class & type: Valiant-class harbor tug
- Displacement: 453 long tons (460 t) (lt); 581 long tons (590 t) (full)
- Length: 90 ft (27 m) (LOA) 82 ft (25 m) (LWL)
- Beam: 38 ft (12 m)
- Draft: 14 ft (4.3 m)
- Installed power: 2 × Caterpillar 3512C at 1,800 hp (1,300 kW) each
- Propulsion: 2 × Schottel Model SRP 1012 z-drive
- Speed: 12.4 knots (23.0 km/h; 14.3 mph) (trial)
- Complement: 6

Valiant (YT‑802) is a United States Navy Valiant-class harbor tug.

== Construction and commissioning ==
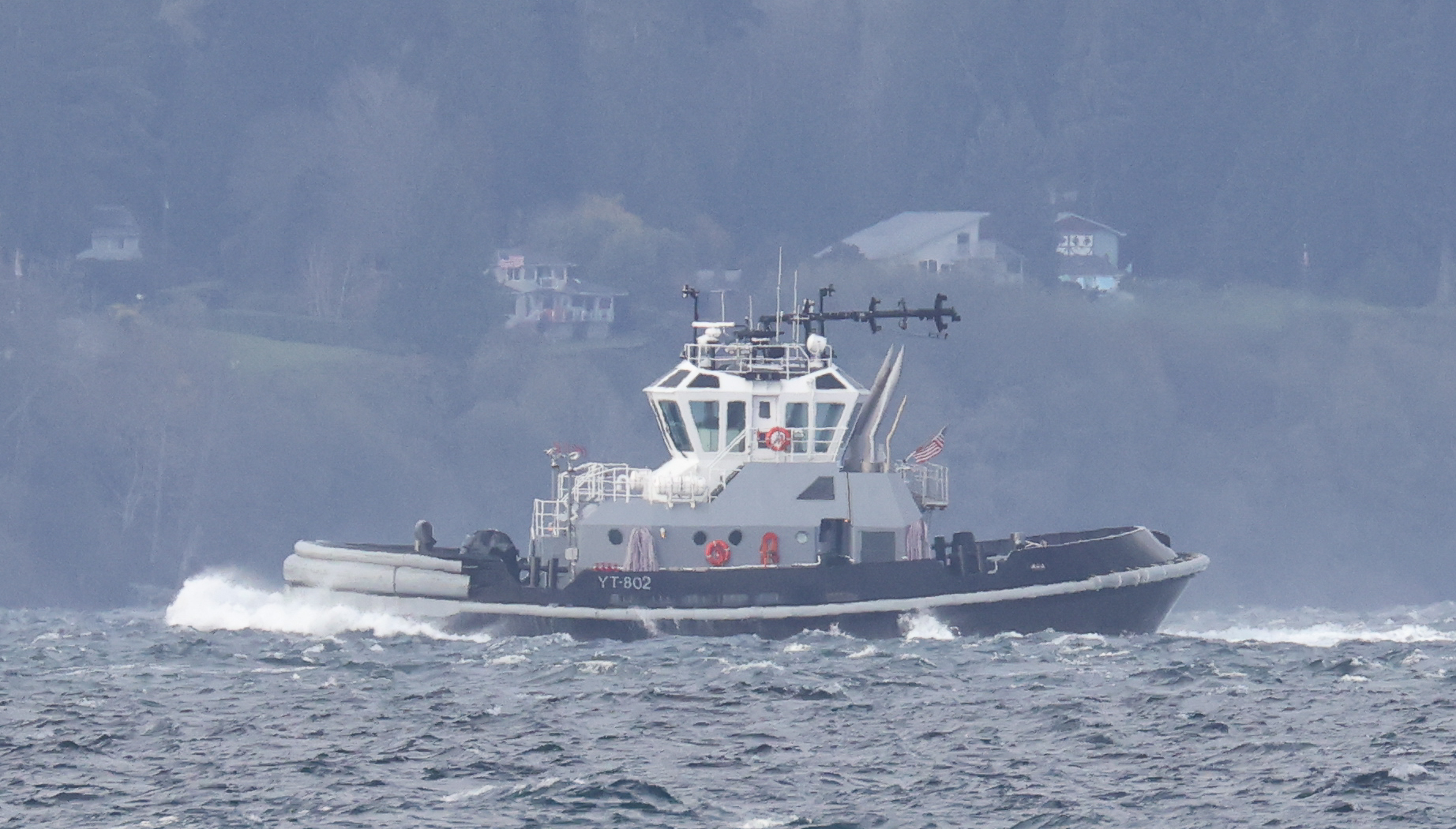
Valiant in Puget Sound in 2024

The contract for Valiant was awarded 10 September 2007. She was laid down by J.M. Martinac Shipbuilding Corp., Tacoma, Washington and launched 25 July 2009. Valiant was delivered to the Navy 21 January 2010.

== Operational history ==
Valiant is assigned to the Navy Region Northwest.
