= Reliant (YT-803) =

Tugboat of the United States Navy

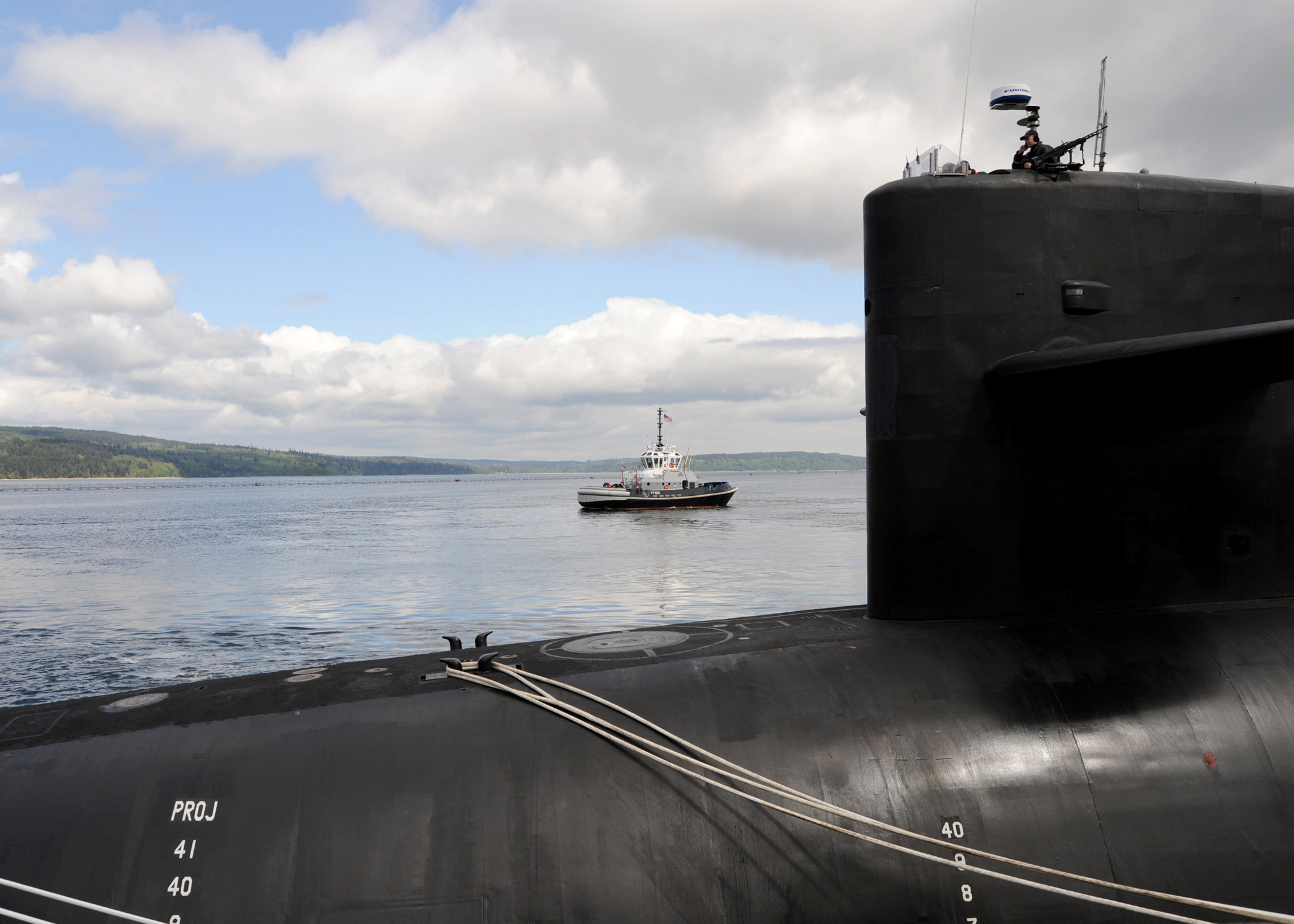
- Reliant passes USS Nevada (SSBN 733) at Delta North, Naval Base Kitsap

History

United States
- Name: Reliant
- Awarded: 10 September 2007
- Builder: J.M. Martinac Shipbuilding Corp.
- Yard number: 249
- Launched: 21 November 2009
- Acquired: 3 May 2010
- Identification: IMO number: 8744315; MMSI number: 367321330; Callsign: WDE2168
- Status: Active

General characteristics
- Class & type: Valiant-class harbor tug
- Displacement: 453 long tons (460 t) (lt); 581 long tons (590 t) (full)
- Length: 90 ft (27 m) (LOA) 82 ft (25 m) (LWL)
- Beam: 38 ft (12 m)
- Draft: 14 ft (4.3 m)
- Installed power: 2 × Caterpillar 3512C at 1,800 hp (1,300 kW) each
- Propulsion: 2 × Schottel Model SRP 1012 z-drive
- Speed: 12.4 knots (23.0 km/h; 14.3 mph) (trial)
- Complement: 6

Reliant (YT‑803) is a United States Navy Valiant-class harbor tug.

== Construction and commissioning ==
The contract for Reliant was awarded 10 September 2007. She was laid down by J.M. Martinac Shipbuilding Corp., Tacoma, Washington and launched 10 July 2010. Reliant was delivered to the Navy 28 September 2010.

== Operational history ==
Reliant is assigned to the Navy Region Northwest.
