= Defiant (YT-804) =

Tugboat of the United States Navy

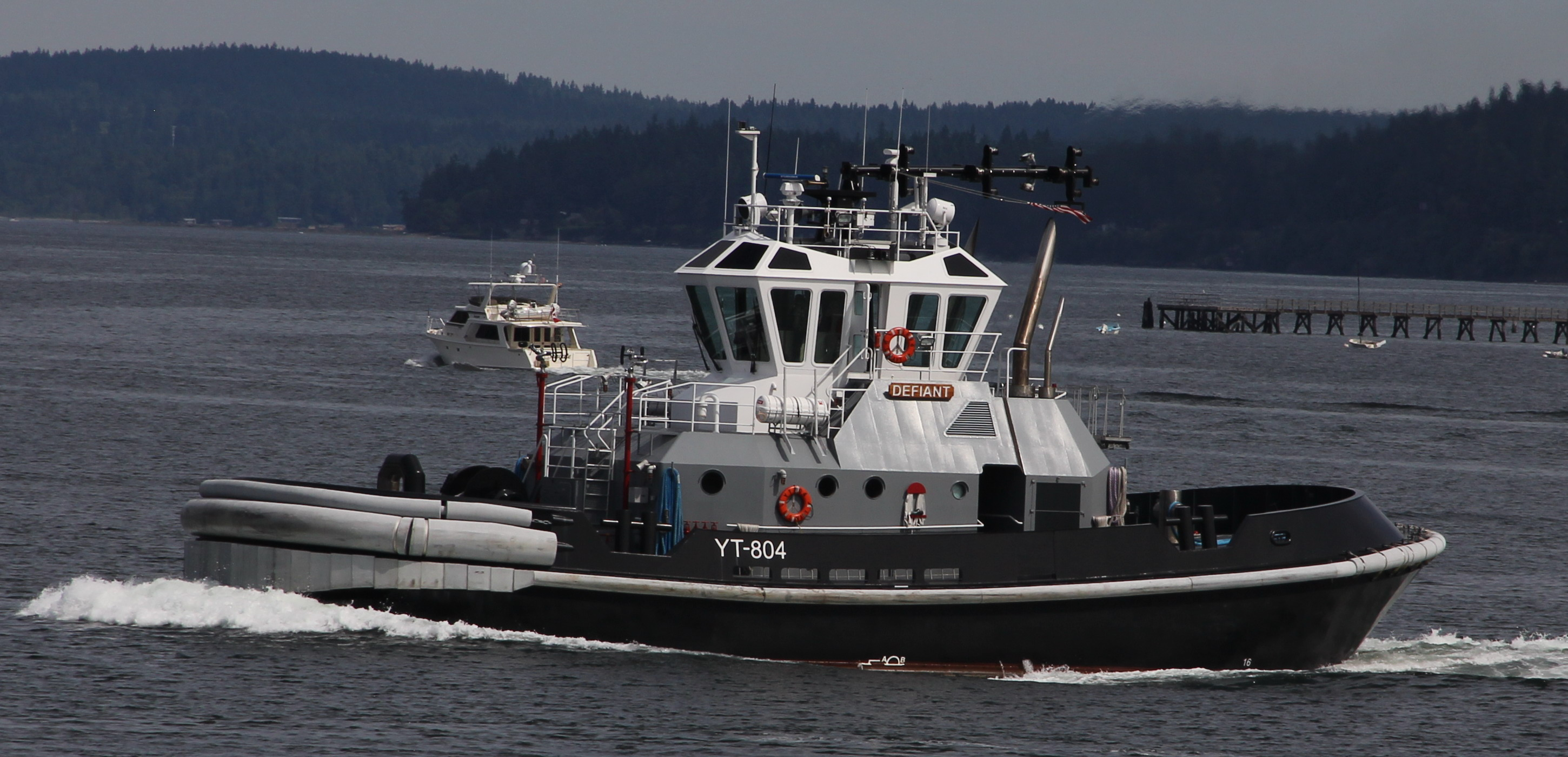
- Defiant (YT-804) returning to Bremerton 25 June 2012

History

United States
- Awarded: 10 September 2007
- Builder: J.M. Martinac Shipbuilding Corp.
- Yard number: 250
- Launched: 10 July 2010
- Acquired: 28 September 2010
- In service: 22 October 2010
- Identification: IMO number: 9603336
- Status: Active

General characteristics
- Class & type: Valiant-class harbor tug
- Displacement: 453 long tons (460 t) (lt); 581 long tons (590 t) (full)
- Length: 90 ft (27 m) (LOA) 82 ft (25 m) (LWL)
- Beam: 38 ft (12 m)
- Draft: 14 ft (4.3 m)
- Installed power: 2 × Caterpillar 3512C at 1,800 hp (1,300 kW) each
- Propulsion: 2 × Schottel Model SRP 1012 z-drive
- Speed: 12.4 knots (23.0 km/h; 14.3 mph) (trial)
- Complement: 6

Defiant (YT‑804) is a United States Navy Valiant-class harbor tug.

== Construction and commissioning ==
The contract for Defiant was awarded 10 September 2007. She was laid down by J.M. Martinac Shipbuilding Corp., Tacoma, Washington and launched 10 July 2010. Defiant was delivered to the Navy 28 September 2010.

== Operational history ==
Defiant is assigned to the Navy Region Northwest.
