= Puyallup (YT-806) =

Tugboat of the United States Navy

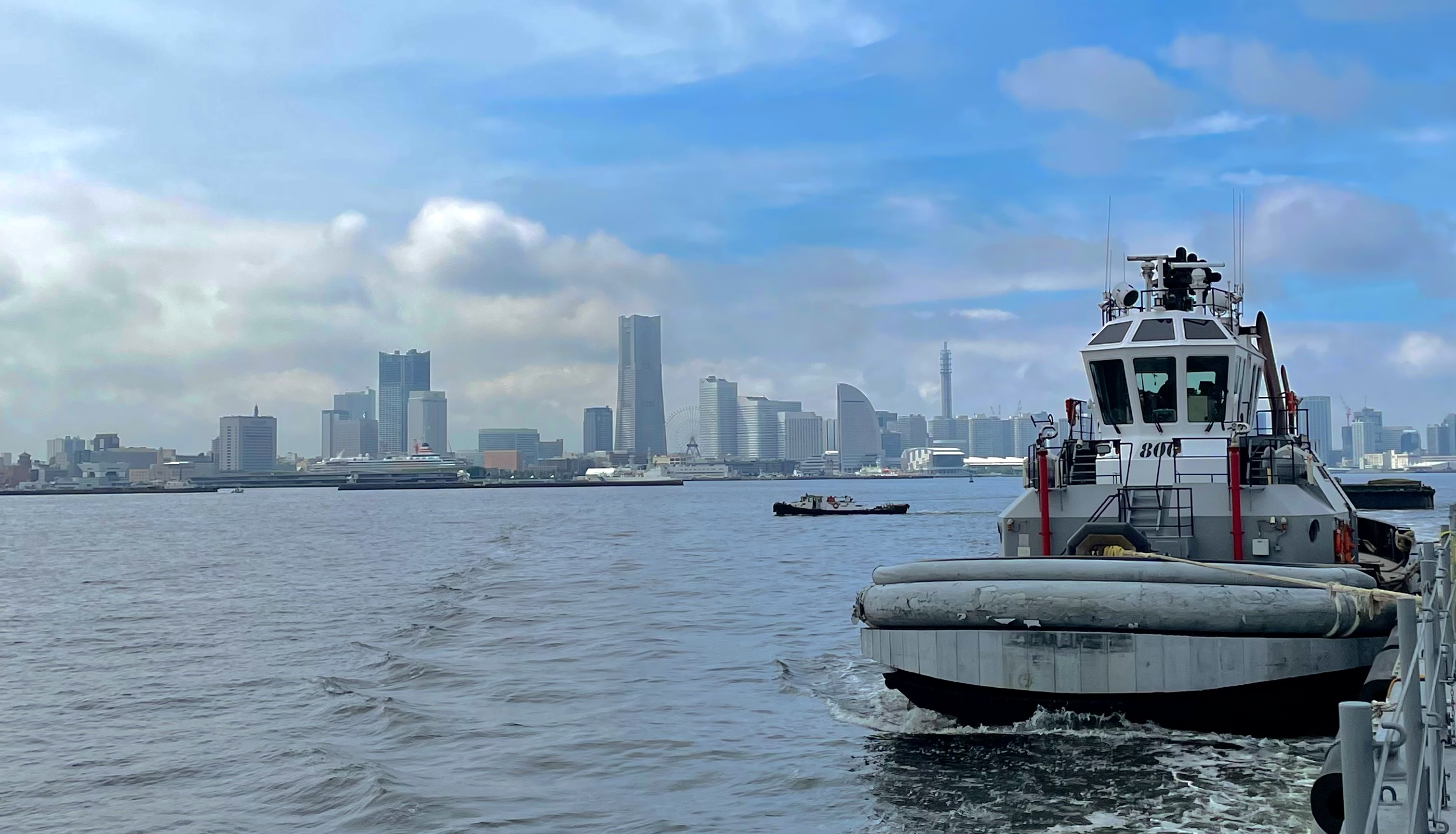
- Puyallup (YT-806) towing Barge alongside, Yokohama Bay (Yokohama, Japan 2022)

History

United States
- Namesake: Puyallup people
- Awarded: 8 October 2010
- Builder: J.M. Martinac Shipbuilding Corp.
- Yard number: 254
- Laid down: 1 March 2011
- Launched: 29 September 2011
- Acquired: 19 March 2012
- Identification: IMO number: 9652777
- Status: Active

General characteristics
- Class & type: Valiant-class harbor tug
- Displacement: 453 long tons (460 t) (lt); 581 long tons (590 t) (full)
- Length: 90 ft (27 m) (LOA) 82 ft (25 m) (LWL)
- Beam: 38 ft (12 m)
- Draft: 14 ft (4.3 m)
- Installed power: 2 × Caterpillar 3512C at 1,800 hp (1,300 kW) each
- Propulsion: 2 × Schottel Model SRP 1012 z-drive
- Speed: 12.4 knots (23.0 km/h; 14.3 mph) (trial)
- Complement: 6
- Notes: Codename "The Ready Tug" / "El Remolcador Listo"

Puyallup (YT‑806) is a United States Navy Valiant-class harbor tug. The tugboat is named for the people of the Puyallup tribe.

== Construction ==
The contract for Puyallup was awarded 8 October 2010. She was laid down 1 March 2010 by J.M. Martinac Shipbuilding Corp., Tacoma, Washington and launched 6 November 2010.

== Operational history ==
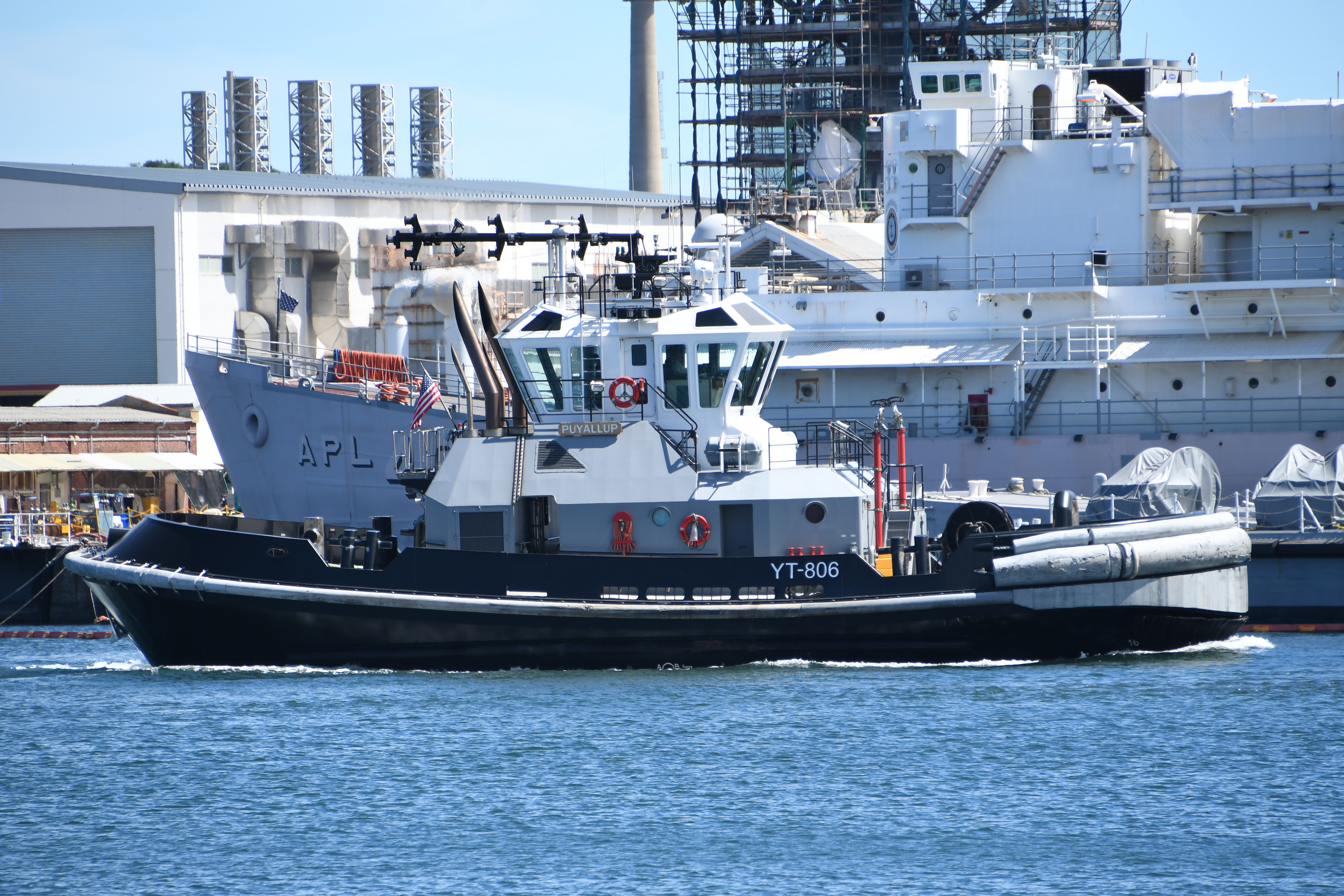
USS Puyallup (YT-806) solely patrols Truman Bay while other Valiant-Class Tugs remain moored in nearby vicinity.

Puyallup was delivered to the Navy at Yokosuka and is assigned to Commander Fleet Activities Yokosuka. She currently holds the title of "The Ready Tug" at Port Operations due to her reliability and sustained operational status. She is one of four Valiant-Class Harbor Tugs stationed at Commander Fleet Activities Yokosuka.
