= Rainier-class harbor tug =

American naval tugboat class

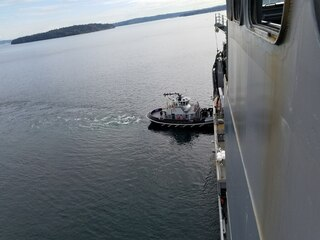
- Rainer assisting USNS Richard E. Byrd at Naval Magazine Indian Island

Class overview
- Builders: Dakota Creek Industries, Anacortes, Washington
- Operators: United States Navy
- Preceded by: Valiant-class harbor tug
- Built: 2019–2022
- In commission: 2020–present
- Planned: 6
- Completed: 6
- Active: 6

General characteristics
- Type: Tug boat
- Length: 27.42 m (90 ft 0 in)
- Beam: 11.65 m (38 ft 3 in)
- Draught: 4.88 m (16 ft 0 in)
- Depth: 5.00 m (16 ft 5 in)
- Propulsion: 1 × CAT 3512E main engines with Schottel 1012 Z-Drives
- Speed: 12 knots (22 km/h; 14 mph)
- Complement: 6

The Rainier class is a class of tug boats built for the United States Navy. They are harbor tugs, whose missions include assisting ships in mooring and navigating in narrow waterways, towing ships and barges, and firefighting. They are designed to work with all Navy ships from carriers to barges to submarines. The class includes six tugs, all of which were launched in 2020 and 2021. Five of the tugs are assigned to Navy Region Northwest and one, YT-809 Agamenticus, to the Portsmouth Naval Shipyard.

== Origins ==
The Rainier class was intended to replace Navy harbor tugs which were built between 1964 and 1975, which by the 2020s had reached the end of their service life.

The ships were designed by Robert Allen Ltd of Vancouver, B.C. The design is an evolution of the YT-802 Valiant class, which is, in turn, an evolution of the Z-tech 6000 commercial tug design produced by Robert Allen Ltd.

Contracts for the construction of the first four ships in the class were awarded to Dakota Creek Industries of Anacortes, Washington on 13 July 2018. The Navy exercised its option to build two more tugs (YT-812 and YT-813) on 9 January 2019. The contract price for this second award was $26,710,222. The total cost for all six tugs was reported as $84 million.

== Characteristics ==
The ships are built of welded steel plates. They are 90 feet (27 m) long overall, with a beam of 38.25 feet (11.66 m), and a draft of 16 feet (4.9 m). Their displacement when light is 420 tons.

They are driven by two Schottel 1012 Z-Drives which have fixed-pitch, four-bladed, ducted propellers. These are powered by two Caterpillar 3512E engines. Each of the engines are rated at 1,810 horsepower (1,349 Kw). The ships are capable of more than 12 knots when running without a tow. Their engines generate 40 short tons of bollard pull. The Rainier class is the first tug in the Navy to meet the EPA Tier 4 emission standards. Their fuel tanks have a capacity of 26,000 US gallons (98,000 L).

Electrical power aboard is supplied by two John Deere 6068AFM85 generators, each capable of producing 154 Kw.

The tugs have two fire-fighting monitors mounted forward of the wheelhouse, and a pump that will supply them with 2,000 US gallons (7,600 L) per minute.

The class has a complex fendering system that is capable of pushing both high-sided ships such as aircraft carriers, and the rounded hulls of submarines.

Towing equipment includes an H-bitt on the stern. The tugs have a JonRie 210 series hawser winch on the bow and a JonRie Intertech 421 series capstan on the stern.

The ships have berthing for six people, but typically operate with a crew of four civilian mariners. There is a small galley, a head with a shower, two single rooms for the captain and chief engineer, and two double rooms.

The ships are built to American Bureau of Shipping classification standards.

Navy guidelines for these non-commissioned vessels do not accord them official names. Nonetheless, local authorities have named all of the Rainier-class tugs after mountain peaks in their operating areas.

== Ships in class ==
Photo	Hull no.	Name	Launched	Notable operations
	YT-808	Rainier	16 May 2020	
	YT-809	Agamenticus	10 October 2020	Agamenticus was loaded on a barge and towed to Maine. The tug participated in the "Parade of Sail" event in July 2024.
	YT-810	Deception	30 January 2021	
	YT-811	Olympus	8 May 2021	
	YT-812	Baker	14 August 2021	Assisted USS San Juan to Naval Base Kitsap-Bremerton in 2023.
	YT-813	Sentinel	10 December 2021	
