= Seminole (YT-805) =

Tugboat of the United States Navy

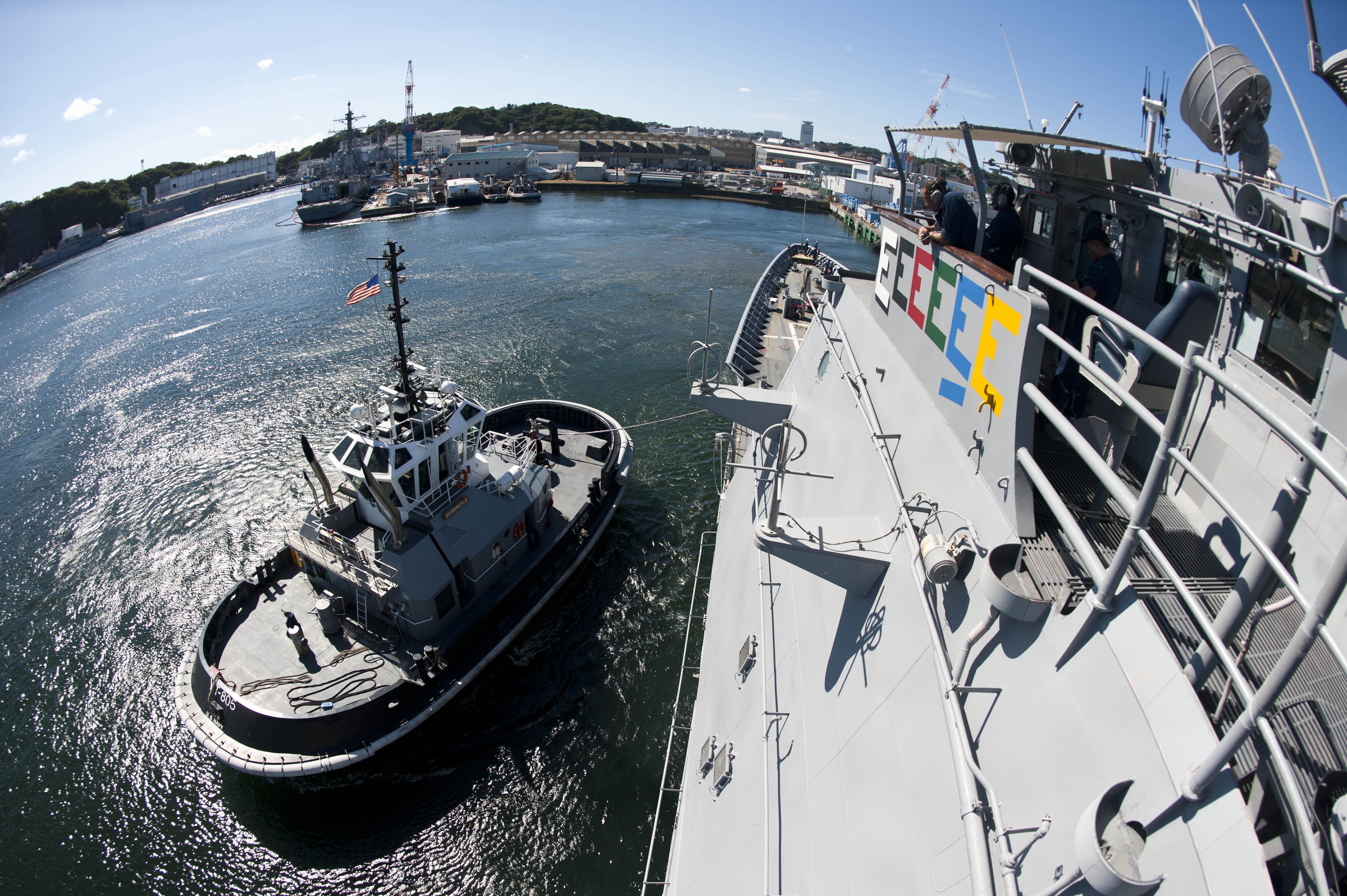

History

United States
- Namesake: Seminole people
- Awarded: 25 March 2008
- Builder: J.M. Martinac Shipbuilding Corp.
- Yard number: 251
- Launched: 6 November 2010
- Acquired: 21 January 2010
- In service: 11 April 2011
- Identification: IMO number: 9603348
- Status: Active

General characteristics
- Class & type: Valiant-class harbor tug
- Displacement: 453 long tons (460 t) (lt); 581 long tons (590 t) (full)
- Length: 90 ft (27 m) (LOA) 82 ft (25 m) (LWL)
- Beam: 38 ft (12 m)
- Draft: 14 ft (4.3 m)
- Installed power: 2 × Caterpillar 3512C at 1,800 hp (1,300 kW) each
- Propulsion: 2 × Schottel Model SRP 1012 z-drive
- Speed: 12.4 knots (23.0 km/h; 14.3 mph) (trial)
- Complement: 6

Seminole (YT‑805) is a United States Navy Valiant-class harbor tug.

== Construction ==
The contract for Seminole was awarded 25 March 2008. She was laid down by J.M. Martinac Shipbuilding Corp., Tacoma, Washington and launched 6 November 2010.

== Operational history ==
Seminole was delivered to the Navy 8 April 2011 at Yokosuka by the US-flagged heavy-lift ship BBC Houston. Seminole is assigned to Commander Fleet Activities Yokosuka.
