= Menominee (YT-807) =

Tugboat of the United States Navy

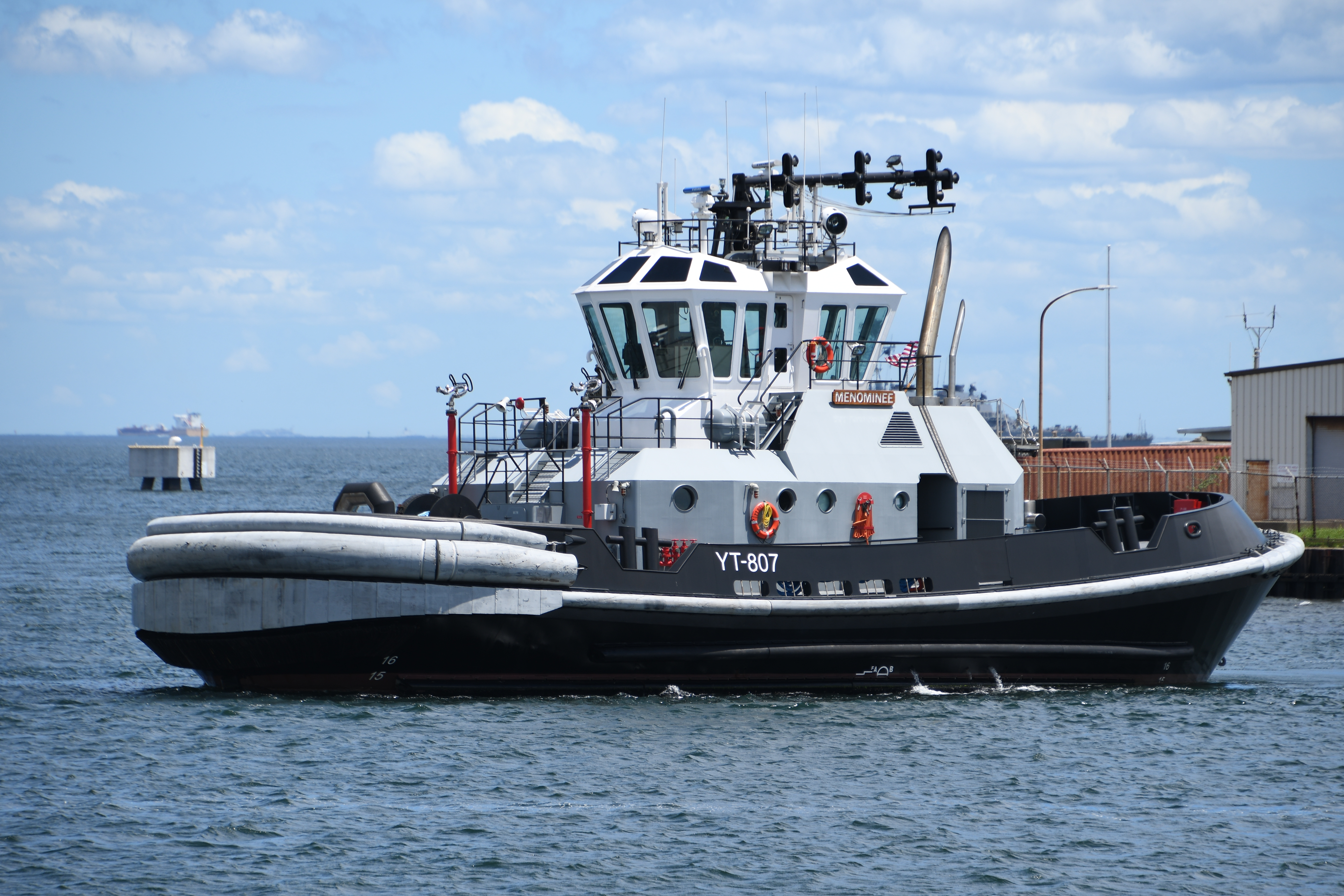

History

United States
- Namesake: Menominee people
- Awarded: 8 October 2010
- Builder: J.M. Martinac Shipbuilding Corp.
- Yard number: 254
- Laid down: 1 April 2011
- Launched: 3 December 2011
- Acquired: 30 March 2012
- In service: 18 May 2012
- Identification: IMO number: 9652789
- Status: Active

General characteristics
- Class & type: Valiant-class harbor tug
- Displacement: 453 long tons (460 t) (lt); 581 long tons (590 t) (full)
- Length: 90 ft (27 m) (LOA) 82 ft (25 m) (LWL)
- Beam: 38 ft (12 m)
- Draft: 14 ft (4.3 m)
- Installed power: 2 × Caterpillar 3512C at 1,800 hp (1,300 kW) each
- Propulsion: 2 × Schottel Model SRP 1012 z-drive
- Speed: 12.4 knots (23.0 km/h; 14.3 mph) (trial)
- Complement: 6

Menominee (YT‑807) is a United States Navy Valiant-class harbor tug. The tugboat is named for the people of the Menominee tribe.

== Construction ==
The contract for Menominee was awarded 8 October 2010. She was laid down 1 March 2011 by J.M. Martinac Shipbuilding Corp., Tacoma, Washington and launched 3 December 2011.

== Operational history ==
Menominee was delivered to the Navy at Yokosuka and is assigned to Commander Fleet Activities Yokosuka.
