= Washtucna =

Washtucna may refer to:

People

- Washtucna (chief), a Native American chief

Places

- Washtucna, Washington

Ships

- USS Washtucna (YTB-826), a United States Navy large harbor tug in service from 1973 to 1997 and reinstated as a yard tug YT-801 in 2008
