= CCGS Limnos =

Canadian survey ship built in 1968

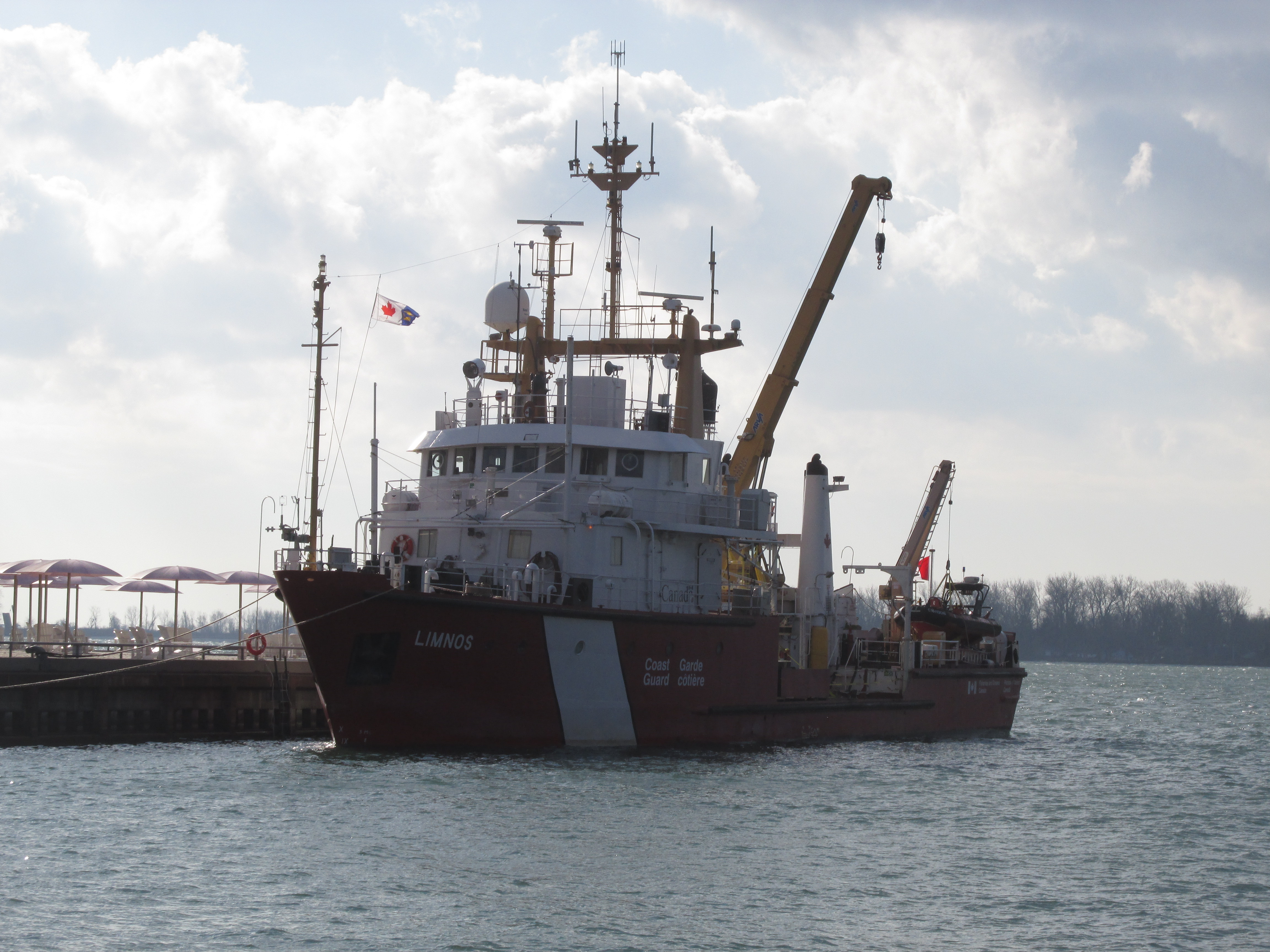
- CCGS Limnos in Toronto, Ontario

History

Canada
- Name: Limnos
- Namesake: Limnology
- Owner: Government of Canada
- Operator: Fisheries and Oceans Canada; Canadian Coast Guard
- Port of registry: Ottawa, Ontario
- Builder: Port Weller Dry Dock Limited, Port Weller, Ontario
- Yard number: 47
- Completed: May 1968
- Commissioned: 1968
- In service: 1968–present
- Refit: 1981, 2010
- Home port: CCG Base Burlington, Ontario – Central and Arctic Region
- Identification: Call sign CG2350; IMO number: 6804903; MMSI number: 316001434

General characteristics
- Type: Research vessel
- Tonnage: 489 GT; 146 NT
- Length: 44.8 m (147 ft)
- Beam: 9.8 m (32 ft)
- Draught: 2.6 m (8 ft 6 in)
- Installed power: 2 × Caterpillar C18 geared diesel engines, 714 kW (957 hp)
- Propulsion: 2 × L-drive azimuth thrusters
- Speed: 10 knots (19 km/h; 12 mph)
- Range: 3,500 nautical miles (6,500 km; 4,000 mi) at 9.5 knots (17.6 km/h; 10.9 mph)
- Endurance: 14 days
- Capacity: 16
- Complement: 14

CCGS Limnos (Note: CCGS stands for Canadian Coast Guard Ship.) is a Canadian Coast Guard coastal research and survey vessel and it is named after the Greek island of Limnos which itself derived from "limni", the Greek word for lake. The ship entered service in 1968 and is currently active. The ship is based on the Great Lakes at the Coast Guard Base in Burlington, Ontario and is used for hydrographic and limnological research.

== Description ==
Of steel construction, Limnos is 44.8 metres (147 ft) long overall and 41.6 metres (136 ft) between perpendiculars with a beam of 9.8 metres (32 ft) and a draught of 2.6 metres (8.5 ft). The ship was built as measuring 460 gross register tons (GRT) and was remeasured with a 468 gross tonnage (GT) and a 146 net tonnage (NT). The ship is powered by two Caterpillar C18 geared diesel engines rated at 714 kW (957 hp) which drive two L-drive azimuth thrusters. This gives the vessel a maximum speed of 10 knots (19 km/h; 12 mph). The ship is also equipped with two Caterpillar C6.6 generators and one Caterpillar C6.6 emergency generator. Limnos has a fuel capacity of 80 m^{3} (18,000 imp gal) of diesel fuel, giving the ship a range of 3,500 nautical miles (6,500 km; 4,000 mi) at 9.5 knots (17.6 km/h; 10.9 mph) and an endurance of 14 days.

The ship is equipped with two laboratories; one 10 m^{2} (110 sq ft) dry laboratory and one 6 m^{2} (65 sq ft) wet laboratory. Limnos has six limnological winches installed. The research vessel is capable of carrying one container on its aft deck. The ship is equipped with Sperry Marine Bridgemaster E radar operating on the E and X bands. Limnos has a complement of 14, composed of 8 officers and 6 crew. There are 16 additional berths.

== Service history ==
Constructed by the Department of Fisheries and Oceans to take over the duties of Porte Dauphine, a vessel on loan from Maritime Command, Limnos was built by Port Weller Dry Dock Limited at their yard in Port Weller, Ontario with the yard number 47. The ship was completed in May 1968 and commissioned that year. Limnos gets her name from the word "limnology" which is the division of hydrology that studies inland waters, including their biological, physical, chemical, geological and hydrological aspects. The ship is registered in Ottawa, Ontario.

Limnos was assigned to Canada Centre for Inland Waters at Burlington, Ontario. The ship was initially intended for hydrographic and limnological research, but has been mostly used for the latter. Limnos has served on joint missions on the Great Lakes with vessels from the United States Environmental Protection Agency.

== Sources ==
- "CCG Fleet: Vessel Details – CCGS Limnos". Canadian Coast Guard. 24 March 2017. Archived from the original on 17 March 2019.
- "Limnos (6804903)". Miramar Ship Index.
- Maginley, Charles D. & Collin, Bernard (2001). The Ships of Canada's Marine Services. St. Catharines, Ontario: Vanwell Publishing Limited. ISBN 1-55125-070-5.
