= A-Rosa Viva =

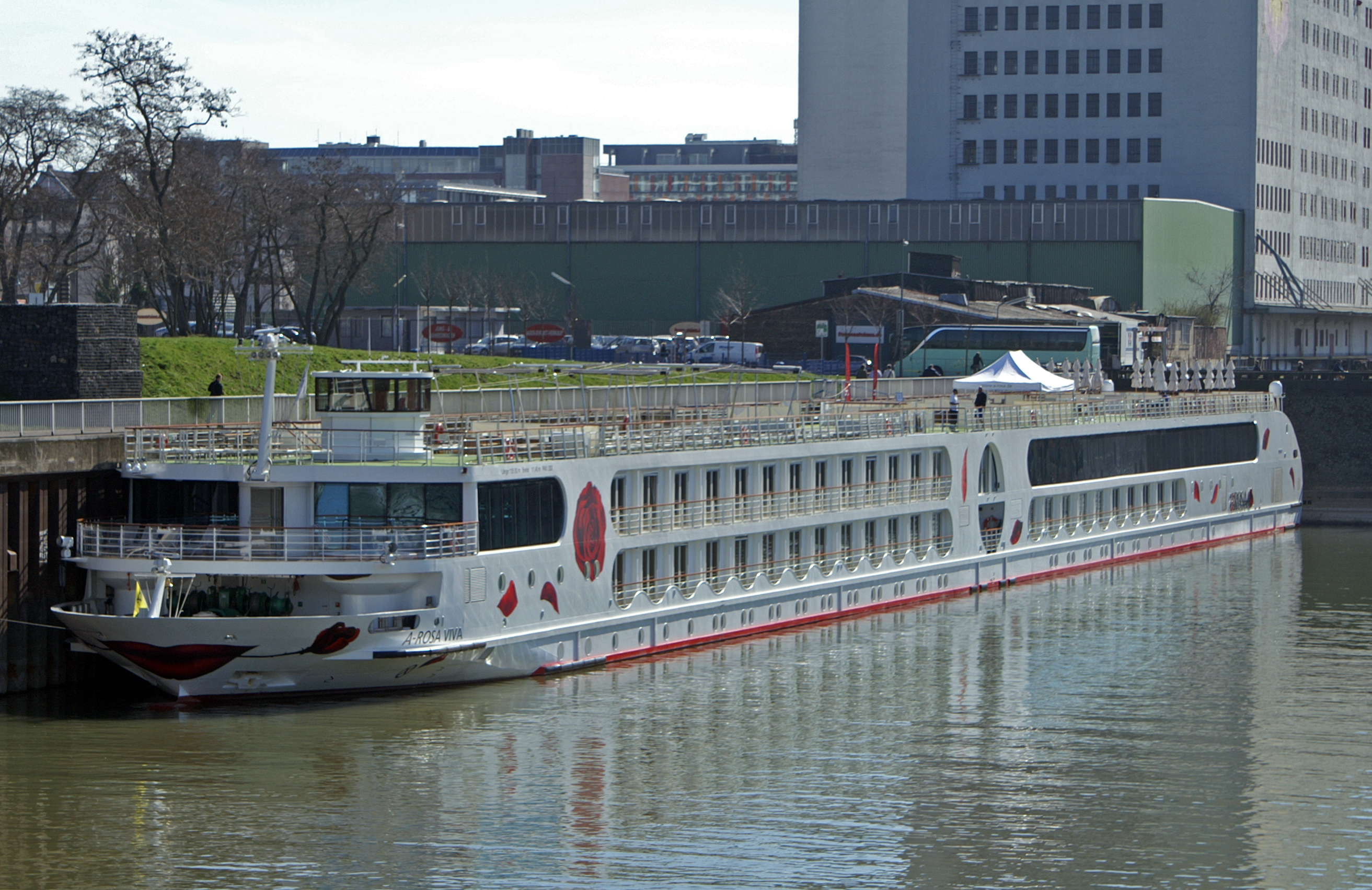
- A-Rosa Viva in the Deutzer harbour in Cologne

History

Germany
- Name: A-Rosa Viva
- Owner: 2010–2012: A-ROSA Flussschiff
- Operator: A-ROSA Flussschiff
- Port of registry: Rostock, Germany
- Builder: Neptun Werft, Warnemünde, Germany
- Yard number: S.515
- Laid down: 23 April 2010
- Christened: 26 March 2010
- Completed: 19 February 2010
- In service: 26 March 2010
- Identification: Call sign: DC4474; IMO number: 9524188; MMSI number: 211488620; ENI number: 04808020
- Status: in service

General characteristics
- Type: River cruise ship
- Tonnage: 3,524 GT
- Displacement: 2,000 t
- Length: 135.00 m (442 ft 11 in)
- Beam: 11.4 m (37 ft 5 in)
- Draught: 1.6 m (5 ft 3 in)
- Decks: 4
- Installed power: 4 × Volvo Penta D12-450MH; 1,324 kilowatts (1,776 hp)
- Propulsion: 4 propellers (Z-drive)
- Speed: 22 km/h (14 mph; 12 kn)
- Capacity: 204 passengers
- Crew: 50

A-Rosa Viva is a German river cruise ship, cruising in the Rhine – Main – Moselle basin. The ship was built by Neptun Werft GmbH at their shipyard in Warnemünde, Germany, and entered service in March 2010. Her sister ships are A-Rosa Aqua and A-Rosa Brava. Her home port is currently Rostock.

== Features ==
The ship has two restaurants, lounge and two bars, Finnish sauna and resting area.

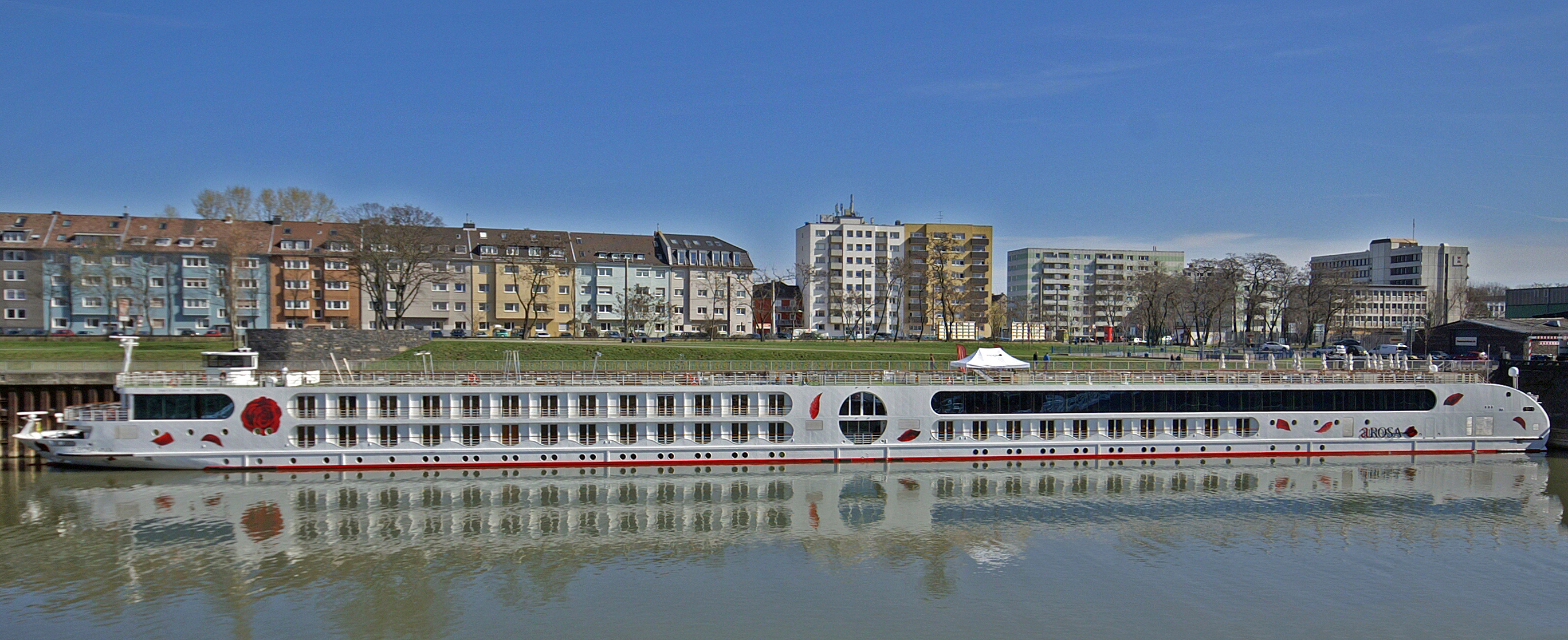
A-Rosa Viva in the Deutzer harbour in Cologne

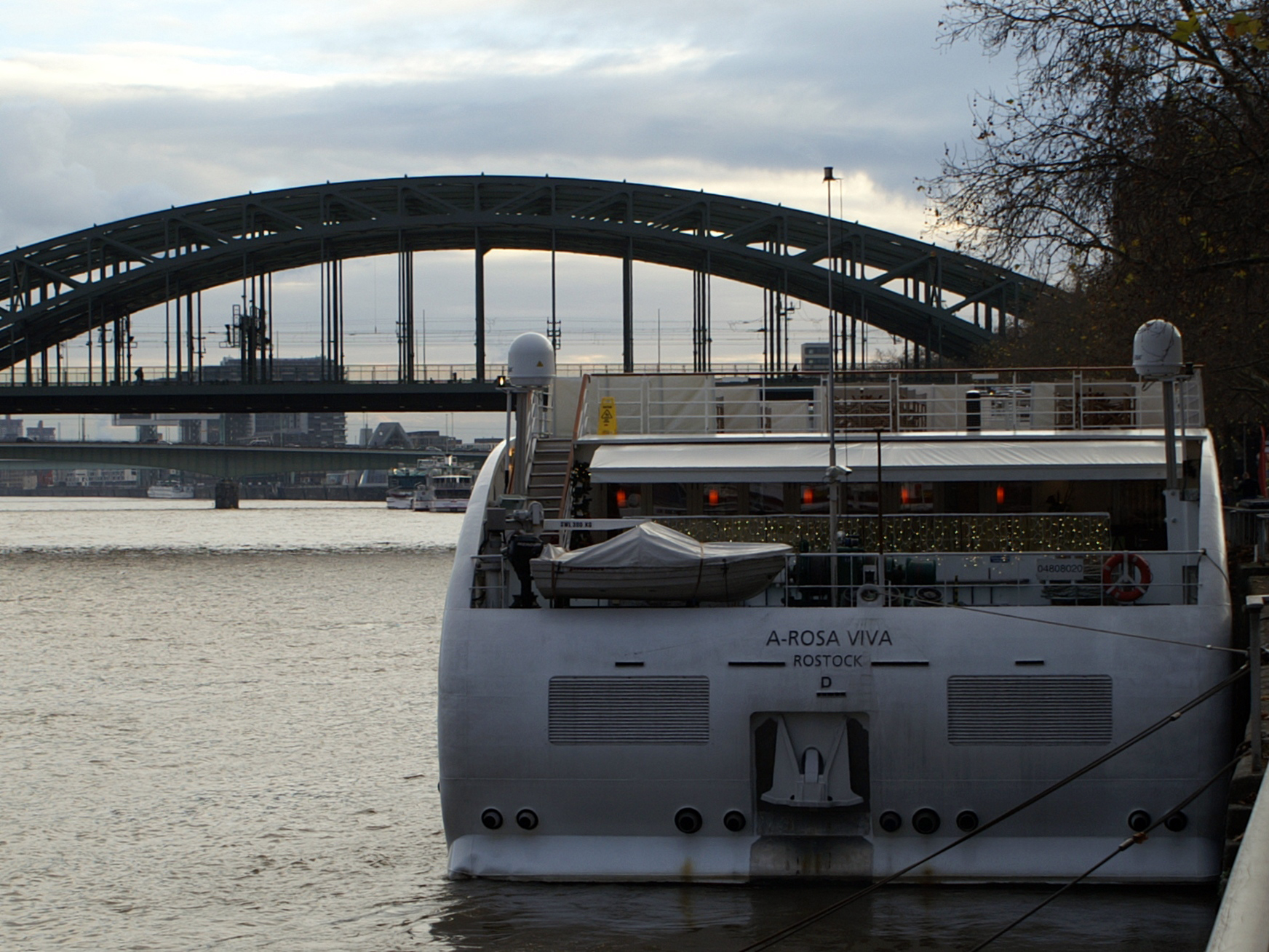
Stern view of the A-Rosa Viva in Cologne

== See also ==
- List of river cruise ships
