= A-Rosa Aqua =

German river cruise ship

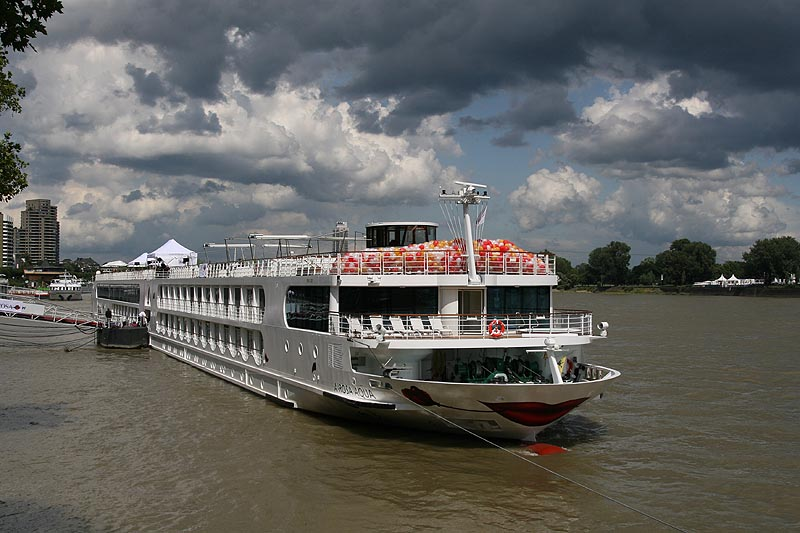
- A-Rosa Aqua on the Rhine River in Cologne

History

Germany
- Name: A-Rosa Aqua
- Owner: 2009–2012: A-ROSA Flussschiff
- Operator: A-ROSA Flussschiff
- Port of registry: Rostock, Germany
- Builder: Neptun Werft, Warnemünde, Germany
- Yard number: S.514
- Laid down: 17 October 2008
- Launched: 27 March 2009
- Christened: 24 July 2009
- Completed: 30 June 2009
- In service: 24 July 2009
- Identification: Call sign: DH2755; IMO number: 9524176; MMSI number: 211455520; ENI number: 04807500
- Status: in service

General characteristics
- Class & type: River cruise ship
- Tonnage: 3,524 GT
- Displacement: 2,000 t
- Length: 135.00 m (442.91 ft)
- Beam: 11.4 m (37 ft)
- Draught: 1.6 m (5.2 ft)
- Decks: 4
- Installed power: 4 × Volvo Penta D12-450MH; 1,324 kilowatts (1,776 hp)
- Propulsion: 4 propellers (Z-drive)
- Speed: 22 km/h (14 mph; 12 kn)
- Capacity: 204 passengers
- Crew: 54

A-Rosa Aqua is a German river cruise ship, cruising in the Rhine – Main – Moselle basin. The ship was built by Neptun Werft GmbH at their shipyard in Warnemünde, Germany, and entered service in July 2009. Her sister ships are A-Rosa Brava and A-Rosa Viva. Her home port is currently Rostock.

== Features ==
The ship has two restaurants, lounge and two bars, Finnish sauna and resting area.

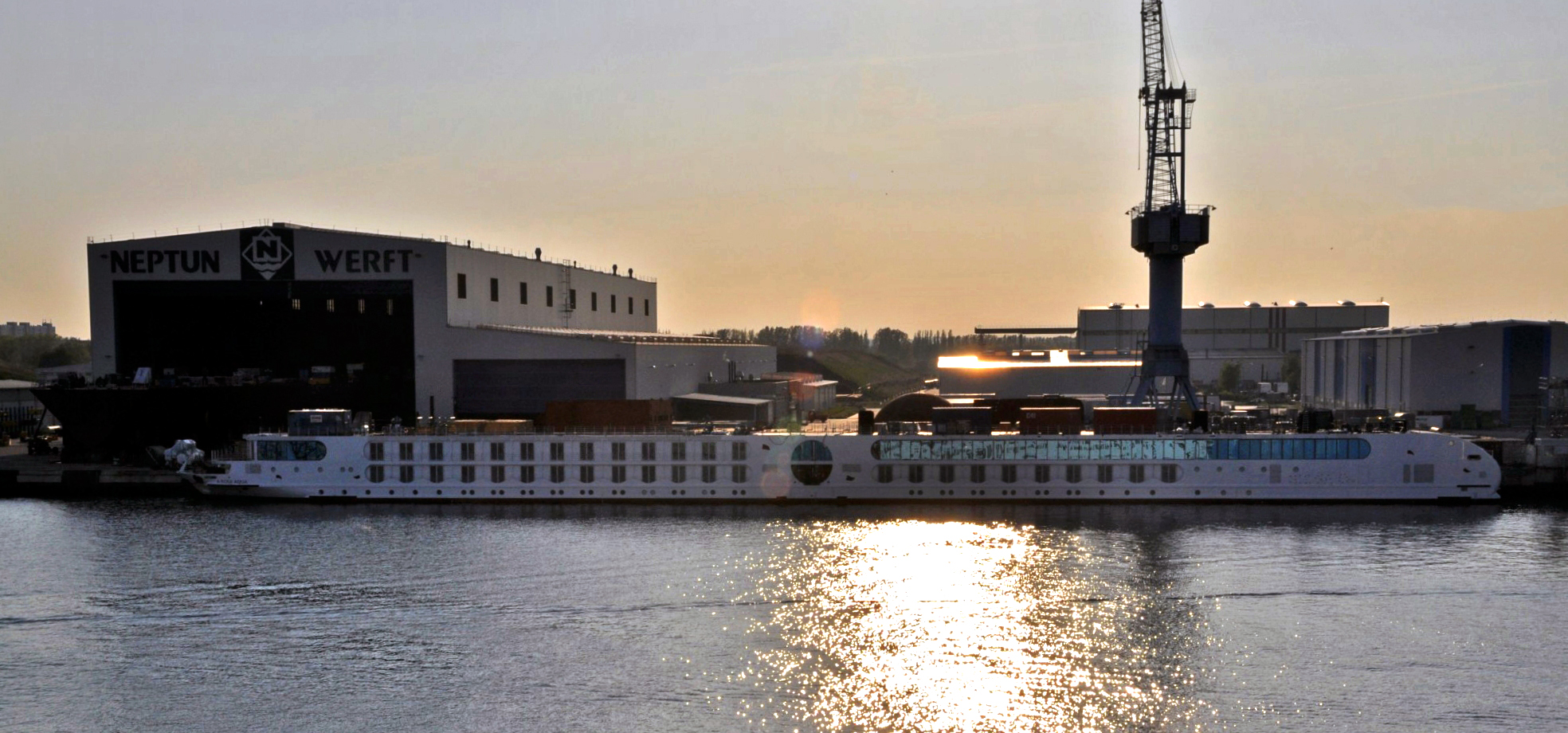
A-Rosa Aqua at shipyard Neptun Werft

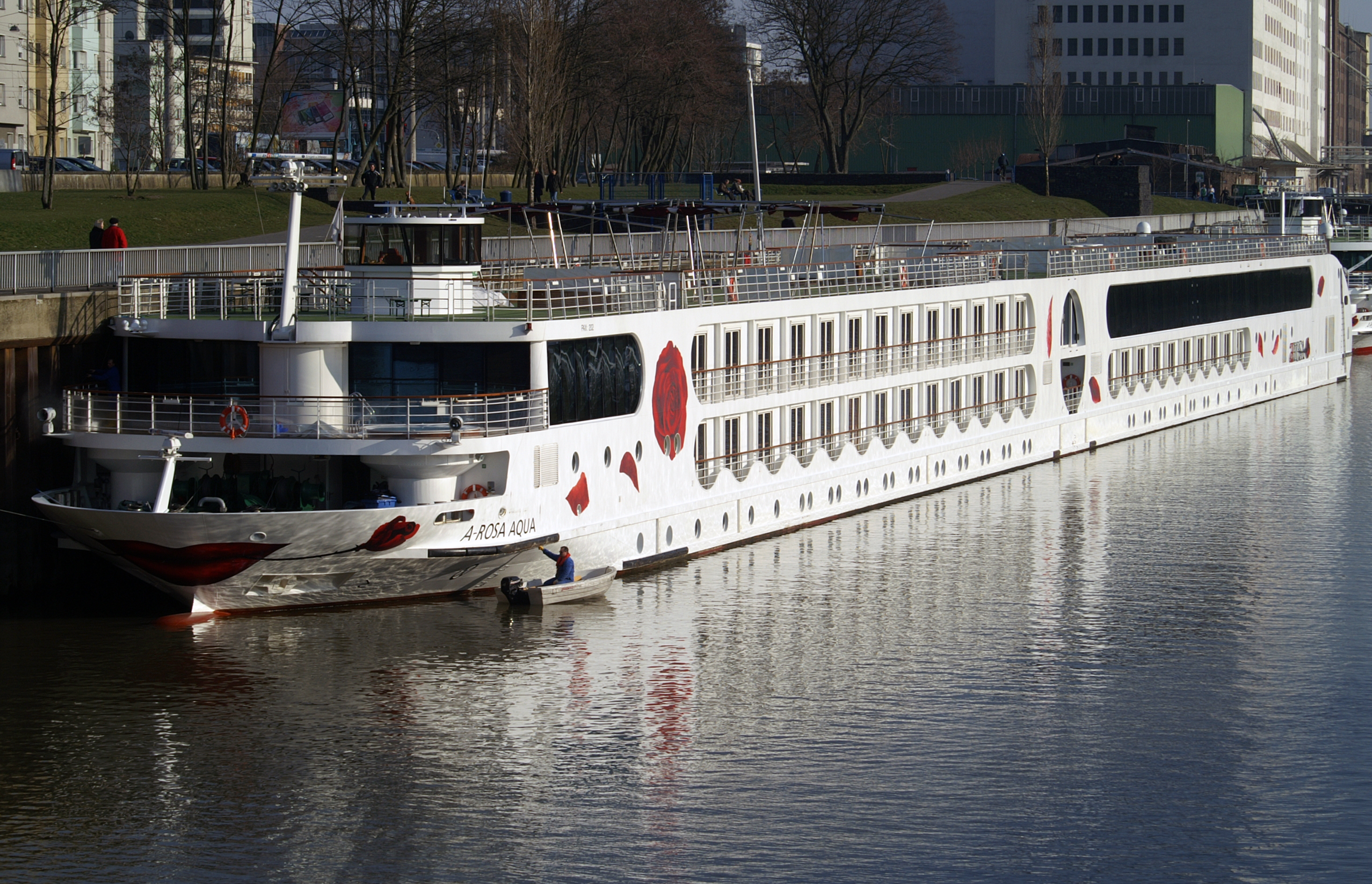
A-Rosa Aqua in Cologne

== See also ==
- List of river cruise ships
