= Pallet Shuttle Barge =

Cargo ship operating on inland waterways

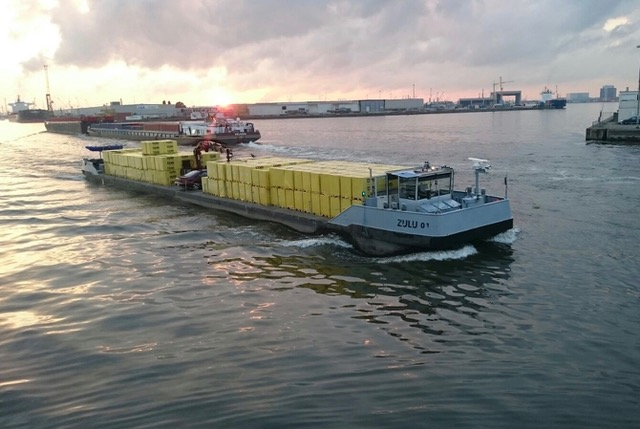
Pallet Shuttle Barge Zulu 01 with pallets

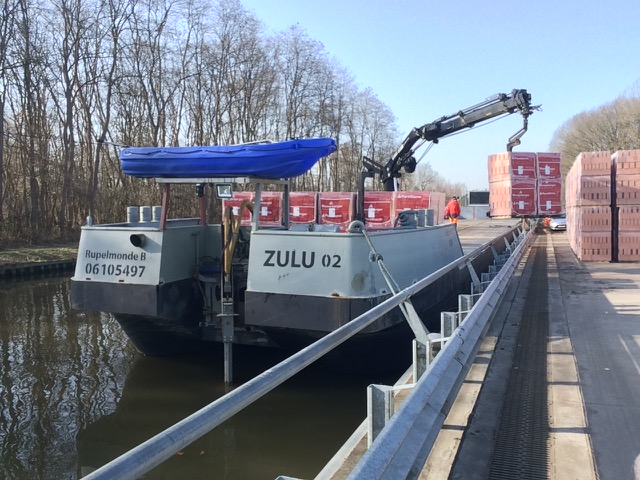
Pallet Shuttle Barge Zulu 02 with cargo

A Pallet Shuttle Barge or PSB is a cargo ship designed to operate on inland waterways for the transport of goods on pallets or in big bags. It is a type of catamaran with two parallel hulls supporting a vast cargo deck. It was designed to offer a competitive alternative to freighter trucks to reduce traffic congestion and carbon emissions. One PSB has the same loading capacity as 10 cargo trucks cutting carbon emissions by a third.

Compared with traditional freighters the PSB also offers a number of advantages:

- A small draft (2,2 m when fully laden) allowing access to undeep waterways
- A safe and shorter loading and unloading process because the goods do not need to be moved into containers first.
- Goods are transported directly on deck, not placed in a hold. The deck offers space for 200 pallets per layer, stacked up to at least 4 m high.
- Smaller size barges resulting in lower operational costs and allowing access to smaller inland waterways.
- Equipped with its own crane enabling independent loading and unloading, requiring little or no port infrastructure.
- Equipped with Azimuth thruster propulsion and bow-thrusters using less power than trucks to transport the same quantities.
- No living accommodation on board of the barge.
- Operable by single crew.

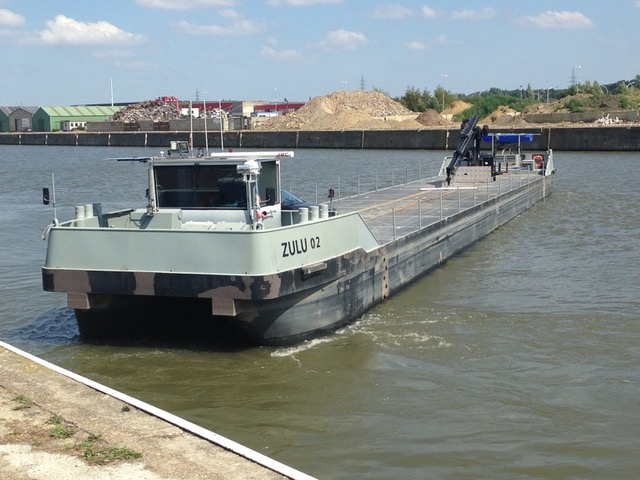
Pallet Shuttle Barge Zulu 02

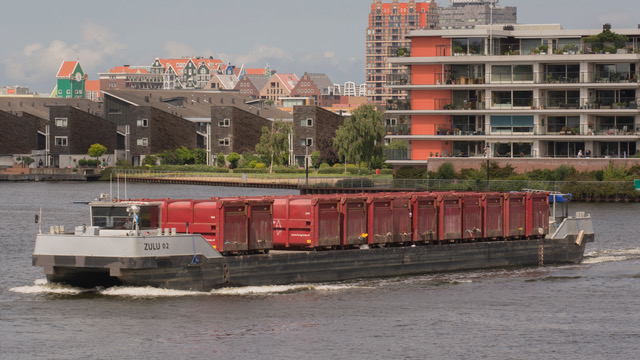
Pallet Shuttle Barge Zulu 02

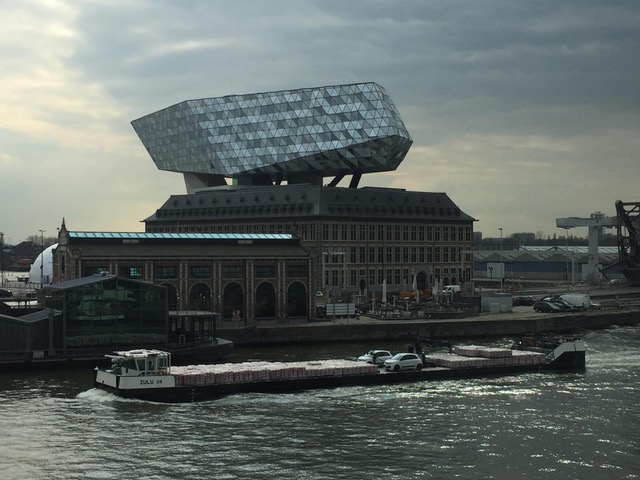
Pallet Shuttle Barge Zulu 04 at port of Antwerp

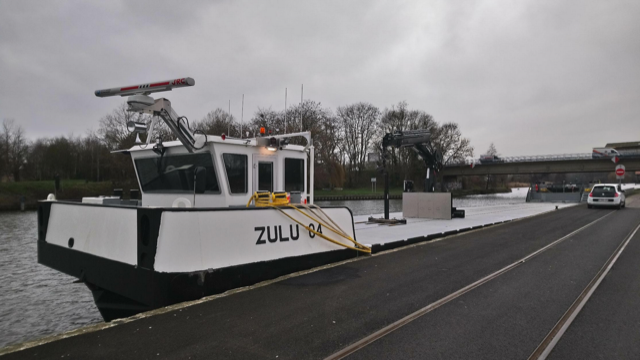
Pallet Shuttle Barge Zulu 04

== History ==
The Pallet Shuttle Barge was invented by Antoon Van Coillie. The first one was built in 2014 and was commissioned by Blue Line Logistics nv.

== Capacity ==
It has a carrying capacity of 300 T or 198 euro pallets.

In a further development of the PSB concept, 2 larger units called Maxi ZULU with a carrying capacity of 450T will be built in 2020.

== Dimensions ==
Its standard dimensions are 50 m long and 6,6 m wide. Its draft is up to 2,2 m when fully laden.

The Maxi ZULU version is planned to be 54 m long and 8 m wide, its draft will still be limited to 2,2 m at full load.

== Fleet ==
Currently there are two Pallet Shuttle Barges. They carry the name ZULU. The PSB fleet will be expanded to 30 or 40 vessels.

| Name | Country | Construction year | Capacity |
|---|---|---|---|
| ZULU01 | Belgium | 2014 | 300T |
| ZULU02 | Belgium | 2015 | 300T |
| ZULU03 | Belgium | 2018 | 300T |
| ZULU04 | Belgium | 2018 | 300T |
