= A-Rosa Brava =

River cruise ship in Germany

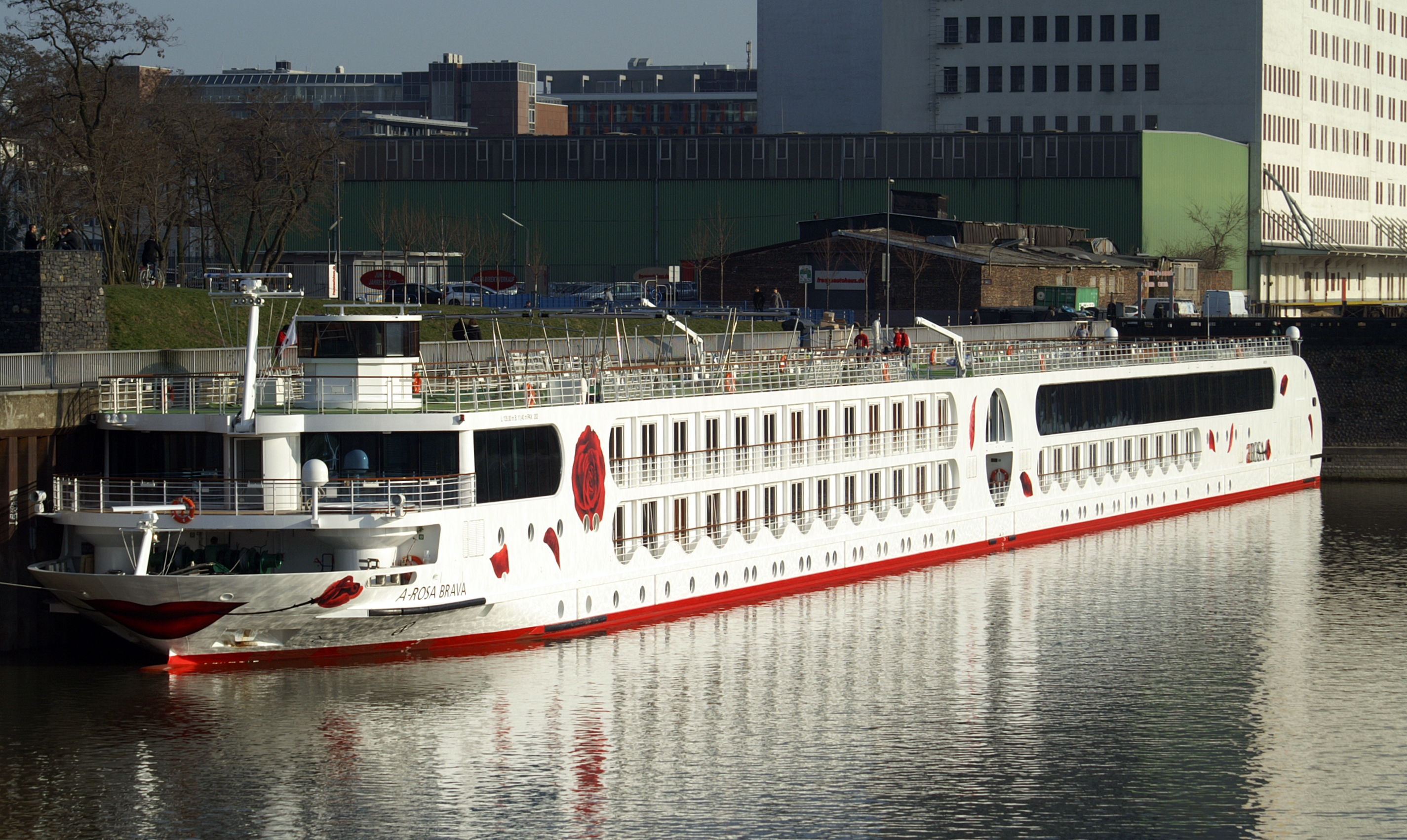
- A-Rosa Brava on the Rhine River in Cologne

History

Germany
- Name: A-Rosa Brava
- Owner: 2011–2012: A-ROSA Flussschiff
- Operator: A-ROSA Flussschiff
- Port of registry: Rostock, Germany
- Builder: Neptun Werft, Warnemünde, Germany
- Yard number: S.516
- Laid down: 28 June 2010
- Christened: 1 April 2011
- Completed: 17 February 2011
- Maiden voyage: 2 April 2011
- In service: 2 April 2011
- Identification: Call sign: DG4600; MMSI number: 211519930; ENI number: 04809910
- Status: in service

General characteristics
- Class & type: River cruise ship
- Displacement: 2,000 t
- Length: 135.00 m (442.91 ft)
- Beam: 11.4 m (37 ft)
- Draught: 1.6 m (5.2 ft)
- Decks: 4
- Installed power: 4 × Volvo Penta D12-450MH; 1,324 kilowatts (1,776 hp)
- Propulsion: 4 propellers (Z-drive)
- Speed: 22 km/h (14 mph; 12 kn)
- Capacity: 202 passengers
- Crew: 50

A-Rosa Brava is a German river cruise ship, that operates in the Rhine – Main – Moselle basin. The ship was built by Neptun Werft GmbH at their shipyard in Warnemünde, Germany, and entered service in April 2011. Her sister ships are A-Rosa Aqua and A-Rosa Viva. Her home port is currently Rostock.

== Features ==
The ship has two restaurants, lounge and two bars, Finnish sauna and resting area.

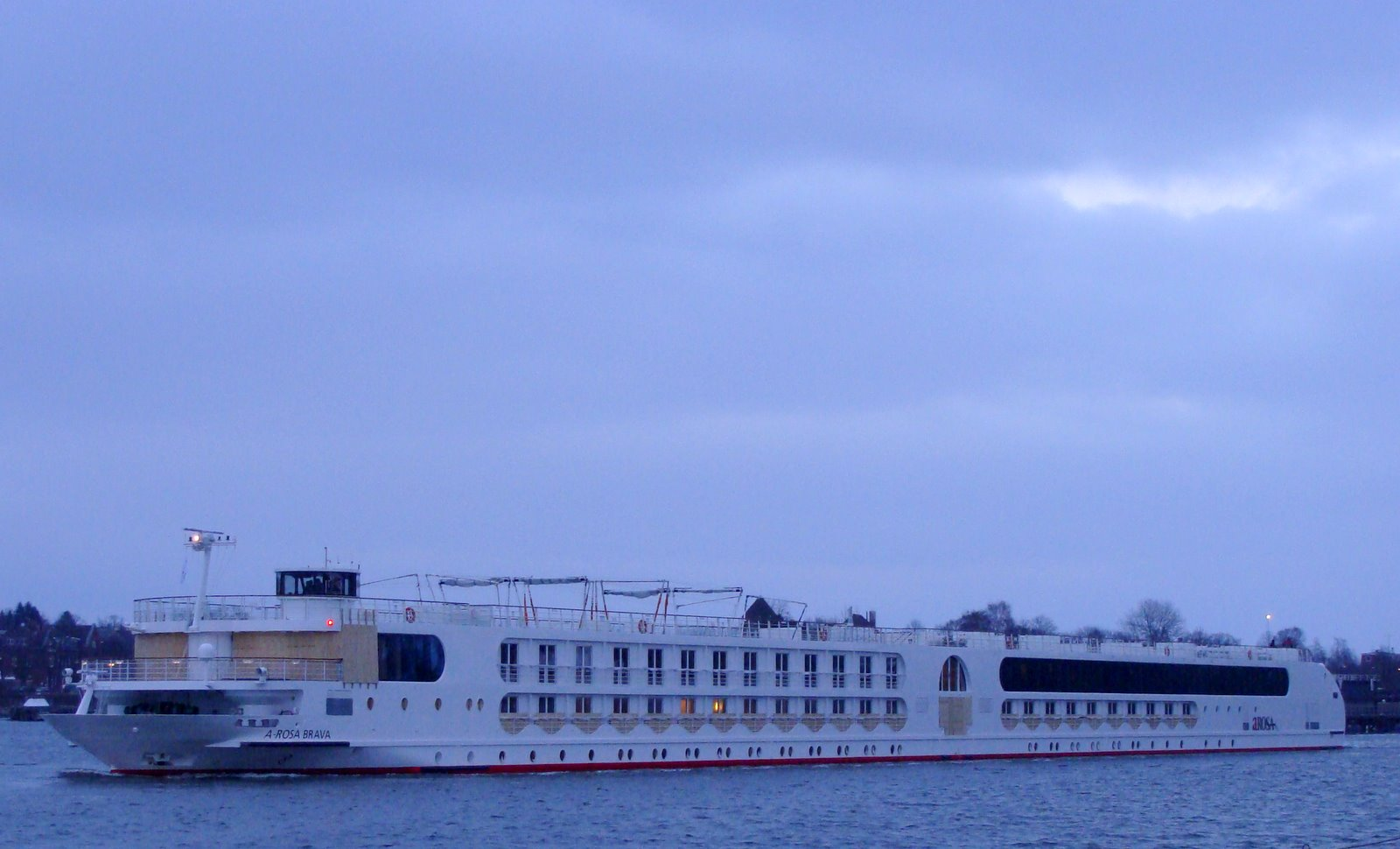
A-Rosa Brava underway from Kiel-Holtenau to Brunsbüttel

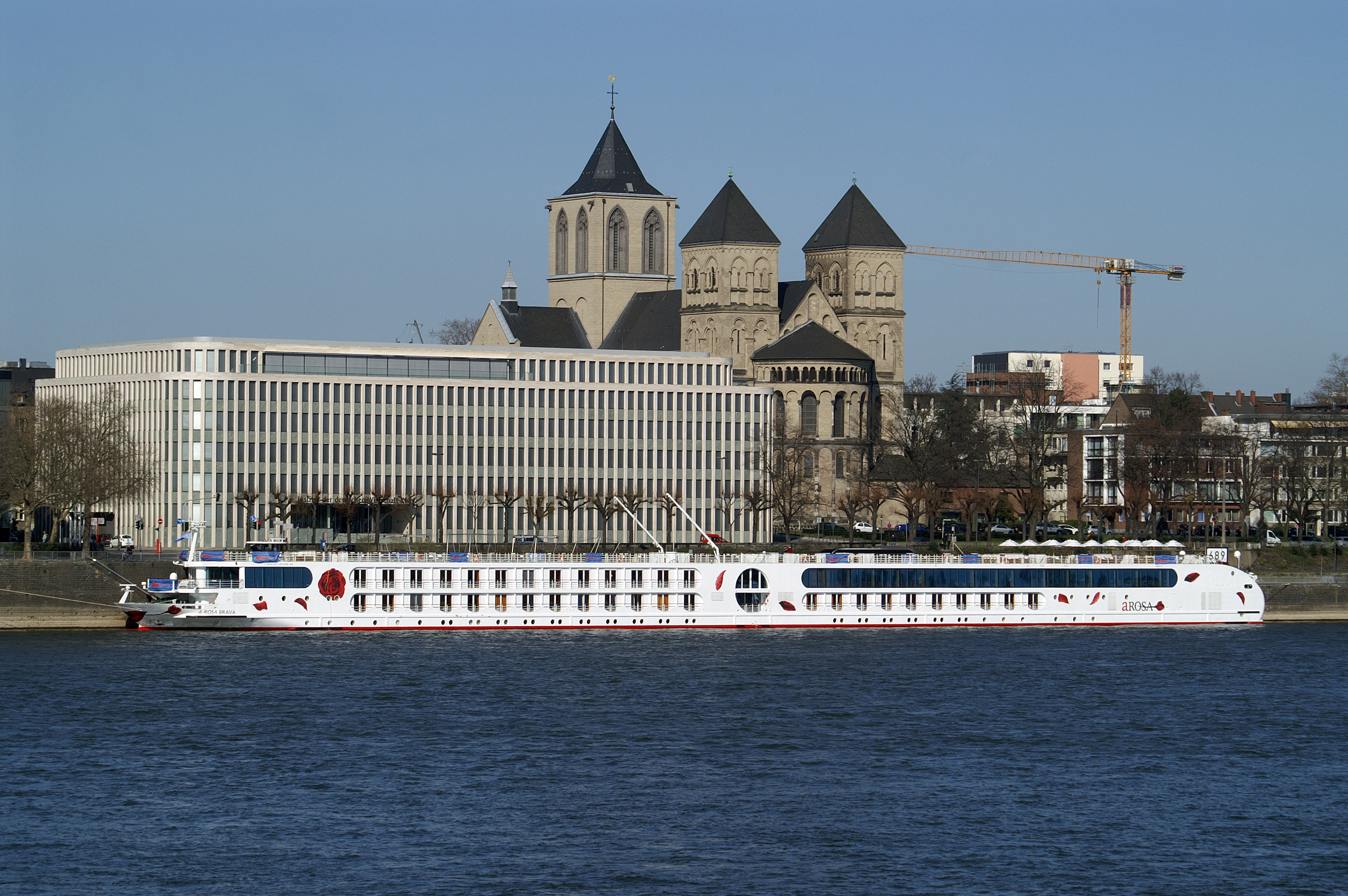
A-Rosa Brava in Cologne at the presentation

== See also ==
- List of river cruise ships
