= Spay, Germany =

Spay
- Municipality
- Coat of arms

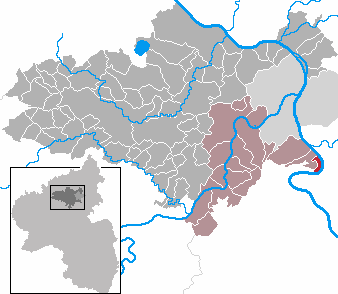
- Location of Spay within Mayen-Koblenz district
- Interactive map of Spay
- Location within Germany Location within Rhineland-Palatinate
- Coordinates: 50°15′30″N 7°38′48″E
- Country: Germany
- State: Rhineland-Palatinate
- District: Mayen-Koblenz
- Municipal assoc.: Rhein-Mosel

Government
  - Mayor (2019–24): Peter Heil

Area
  - Total: 2.7 km^{2} (1.0 sq mi)
- Elevation: 68 m (223 ft)

Population (2025-12-31)
  - Total: 1,869
  - Density: 690/km^{2} (1,800/sq mi)
- Time zone: UTC+01:00 (CET)
  - Summer (DST): UTC+02:00 (CEST)
- Postal codes: 56322
- Dialling codes: 02628
- Vehicle registration: MYK
- Website: www.spay.de

Spay (German pronunciation: [ʃpaɪ]) is a municipality in the district of Mayen-Koblenz in Rhineland-Palatinate, western Germany. It is located on the left bank of the Rhine. It lies within the Rhine Gorge which became a UNESCO World Heritage Site in 2002.

Spay was probably founded by the ancient Celts from whom the name "Spay" stems. There exists also evidence of an ancient Roman Presence in the 4th century. Historically Spay was first mentioned 821 in a deed that placed the village under the protection of Louis the Pious. During the Holy Roman Empire Spay was owned by various feudal Lords and belonged to the archbishop elector of Trier who placed it under the administration of Boppard. It remained in the possession of the electors until it was absorbed by France during the Revolutionary epoch. It was assigned by the Congress of Vienna in 1815 to Prussia.

Spay is home to Schottel GmbH, a propulsor-producing company. The village is also known for its excellent wines (mostly Riesling produced by the local winemakers).
