= L-drive =

An L-drive is a type of azimuth thruster where the electric motor is mounted vertically, removing the second bevel gear from the drivetrain. Azimuth thruster pods can be rotated through a full 360 degrees, allowing for rapid changes in thrust direction and eliminating the need for a conventional rudder. This form of power transmission is called a L-drive because the rotary motion has to make one right angle turn, thus looking a bit like the letter "L". This name is used to make clear the arrangement of drive is different from Z-drive.

== See also ==
- Azipod – Electric drive azimuth thruster
- Propulsor – Mechanical device to propel a vessel
- Z-drive – Steerable marine drive system
- Cyclorotor – Perpendicular-axis marine propulsion system
- Outboard motor – Self-contained propulsion system for boats
