= Washtucna (YTB-826) =

Tugboat of the United States Navy

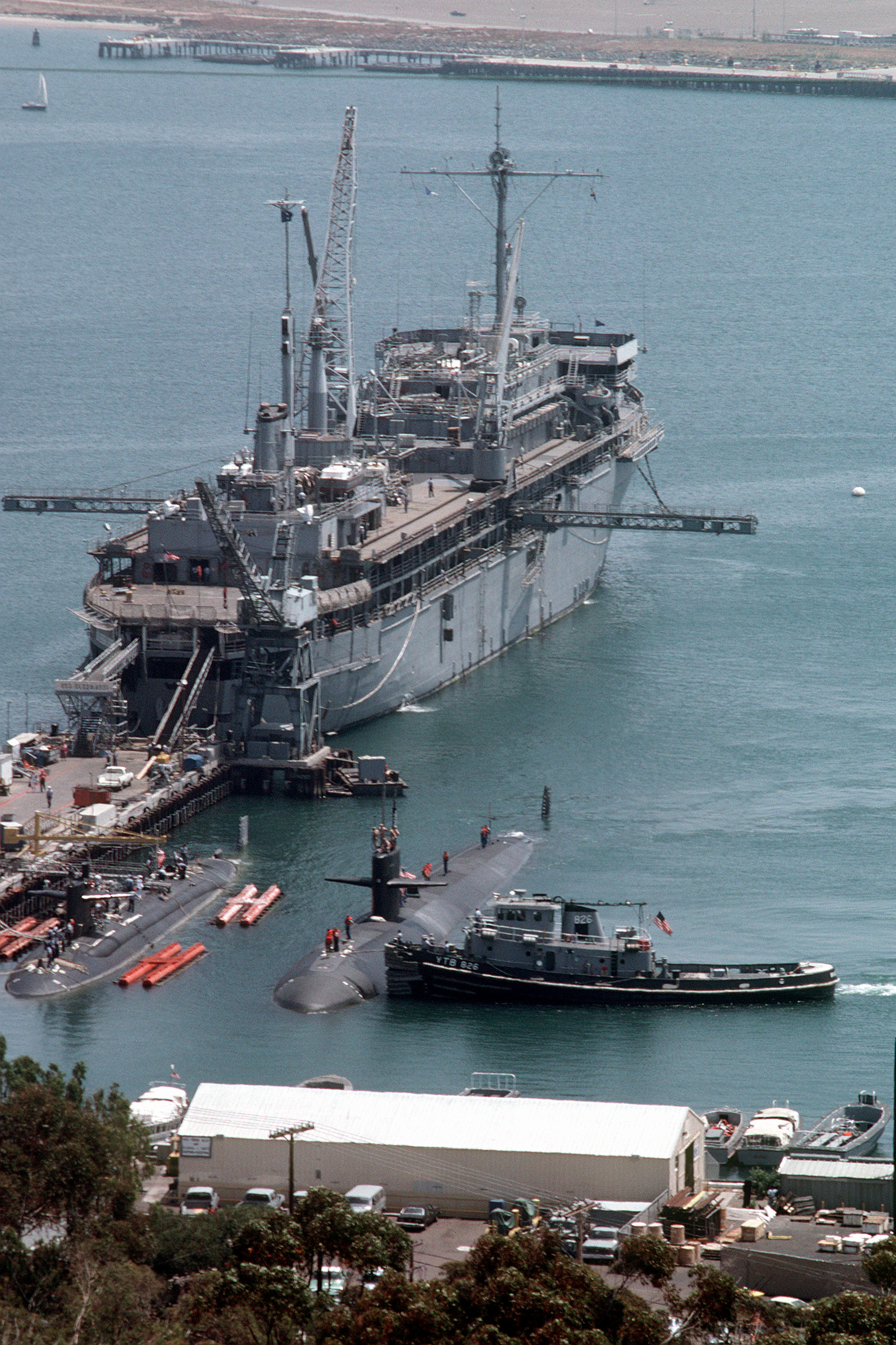
- Washtucna (lower right) assists submarine USS La Jolla (SSN-701) into her berth outboard of submarine USS Plunger (SSN-595) at Submarine Base San Diego, California, on 1 July 1982. Submarine tender USS Dixon (AS-37) is at the rear.

History

United States
- Namesake: Washtucna, a Native American chief, and the town of Washtucna, Washington
- Awarded: 9 August 1971
- Builder: Marinette Marine Corporation, Marinette, Wisconsin
- Laid down: 1 May 1973
- Launched: 9 October 1973
- Acquired: 11 December 1973
- Reclassified: Yard tug, YT-801, 7 October 2008
- Stricken: 21 August 1997
- Reinstated: 7 October 2008
- Identification: IMO number: 9068304
- Status: Active

General characteristics
- Class & type: Natick-class large harbor tug
- Displacement: 286 long tons (291 t) (light); 346 long tons (352 t) (full)
- Length: 108 ft (33 m)
- Beam: 31 ft (9.4 m)
- Draft: 14 ft (4.3 m)
- Installed power: 4000 horsepower (1.5 MW)
- Propulsion: 2 x Caterpillar 3516B diesel engines.; Converted to twin z-drive, 2008
- Speed: 12 knots (14 mph; 22 km/h)
- Complement: 12

Washtucna (YTB-826) was a United States Navy Natick-class large harbor tug named for Chief Washtucna of the Palus tribe.

== Construction ==
The contract for Washtucna was awarded 9 August 1971. She was laid down on 1 May 1973 at Marinette, Wisconsin, by Marinette Marine and launched 9 October 1973.

== Operational history ==
Placed in service at San Diego, California, Washtucna performed local and coastal towing tasks for the 11th Naval District.

Stricken from the Navy List 21 August 1997, ex-Washtucna was transferred to the Department of the Interior at Midway Island 17 October 1997. Converted to twin z-drive, she was reacquired by the navy and reinstated on 7 October 2008. Ex-Washtucna was simultaneously reclassified and redesignated as unnamed yard tug YT-801.

Currently in active service at Bangor, Washington as Z-826.
