= Washtucna (chief) =

Washtucna was a Native American chief of the Palus tribe.

The town of Washtucna, Washington, and the United States Navy tug USS Washtucna (YTB-826) (later YT-801), in service 1973–1997 and since 2008, are named for him.
