= Azimuth thruster =

Steerable propulsion pod under a watercraft

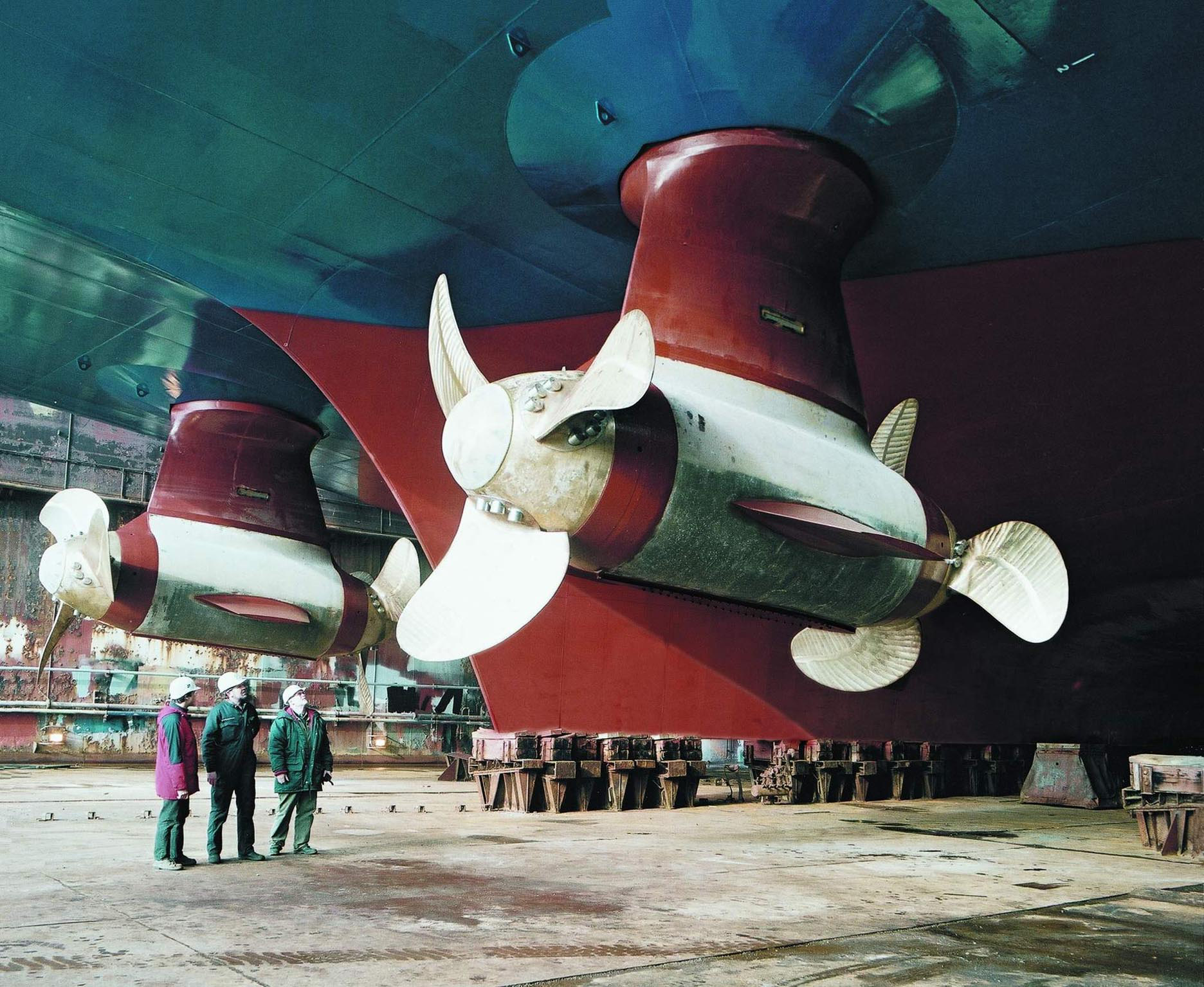
Siemens Schottel azimuth thrusters

An azimuth thruster is a configuration of marine propellers placed in pods that can be rotated to any horizontal angle (azimuth), making a rudder redundant. These give ships better maneuverability than a fixed propeller and rudder system.

== Types of azimuth thrusters ==
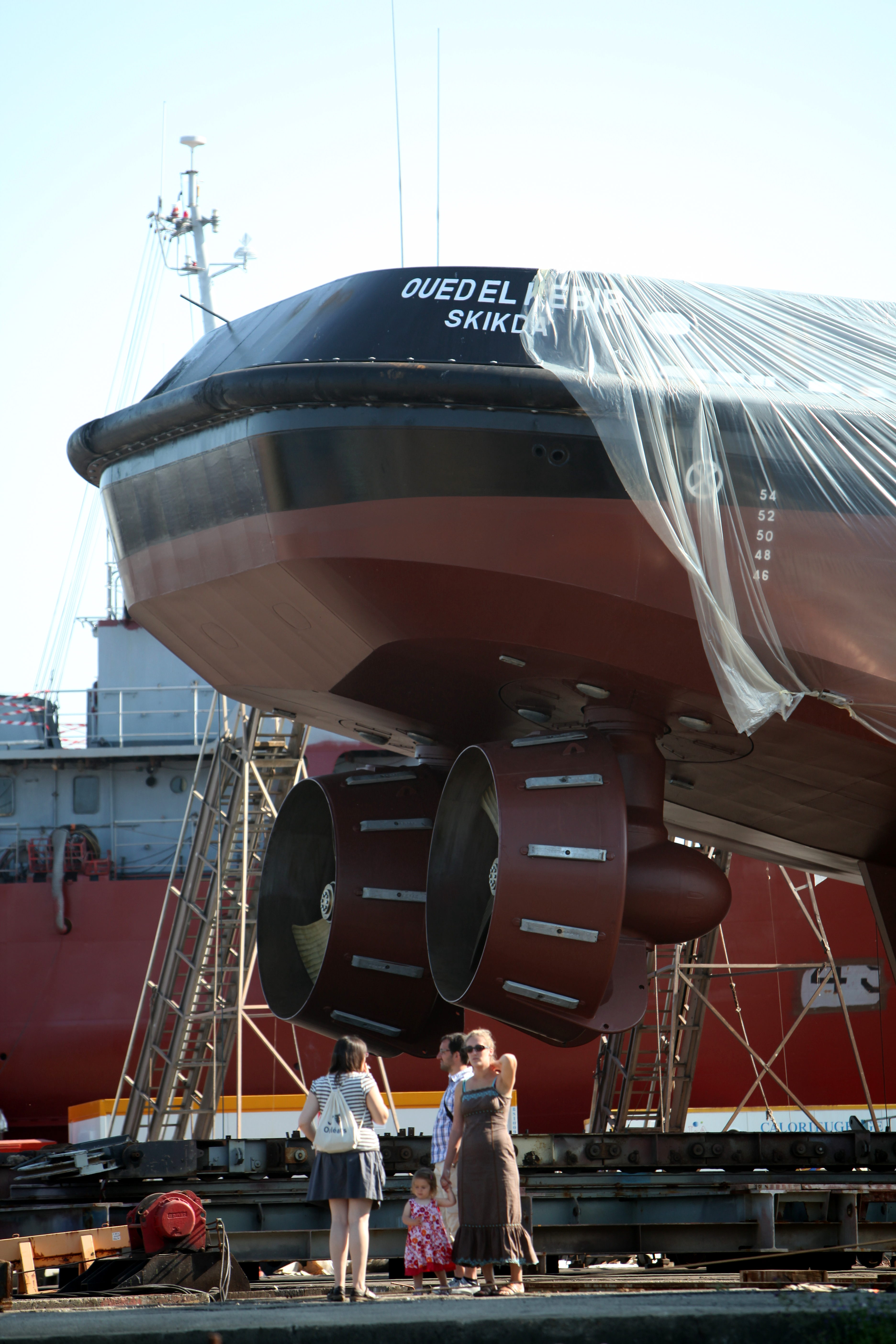
Azimuth thrusters on the tug Oued el Kebir, with Kort nozzles

There are two major variants, based on the location of the motor:

1. Mechanical transmission, which connects a motor inside the ship to the outboard unit by gearing. The motor may be diesel or diesel–electric. Depending on the shaft arrangement, mechanical azimuth thrusters are divided into L-drive and Z-drive. An L-drive thruster has a vertical input shaft and a horizontal output shaft with one right-angle gear. A Z-drive thruster has a horizontal input shaft, a vertical shaft in the rotating column and a horizontal output shaft, with two right-angle gears.
2. Electrical transmission, more commonly called pods, where an electric motor is fitted in the pod itself, connected directly to the propeller without gears. The electricity is produced by an onboard engine, usually diesel or gas turbine. Invented in 1955 by Friedrich W. Pleuger and Friedrich Busmann (Pleuger Unterwasserpumpen GmbH), ABB's Azipod was the first product using this technology.

The most powerful podded thrusters in use are the four 21.5 MW Rolls-Royce Mermaid units fitted to RMS Queen Mary 2.

Mechanical azimuth thrusters can be fixed installed, retractable or underwater-mountable. They may have fixed pitch propellers or controllable pitch propellers. Fixed installed thrusters are used for tugboats, ferries and supply-boats. Retractable thrusters are used as auxiliary propulsion for dynamically positioned vessels and take-home propulsion for military vessels. Underwater-mountable thrusters are used as dynamic positioning propulsion for very large vessels such as semi-submersible drilling rigs and drillships.

== Advantages and disadvantages ==
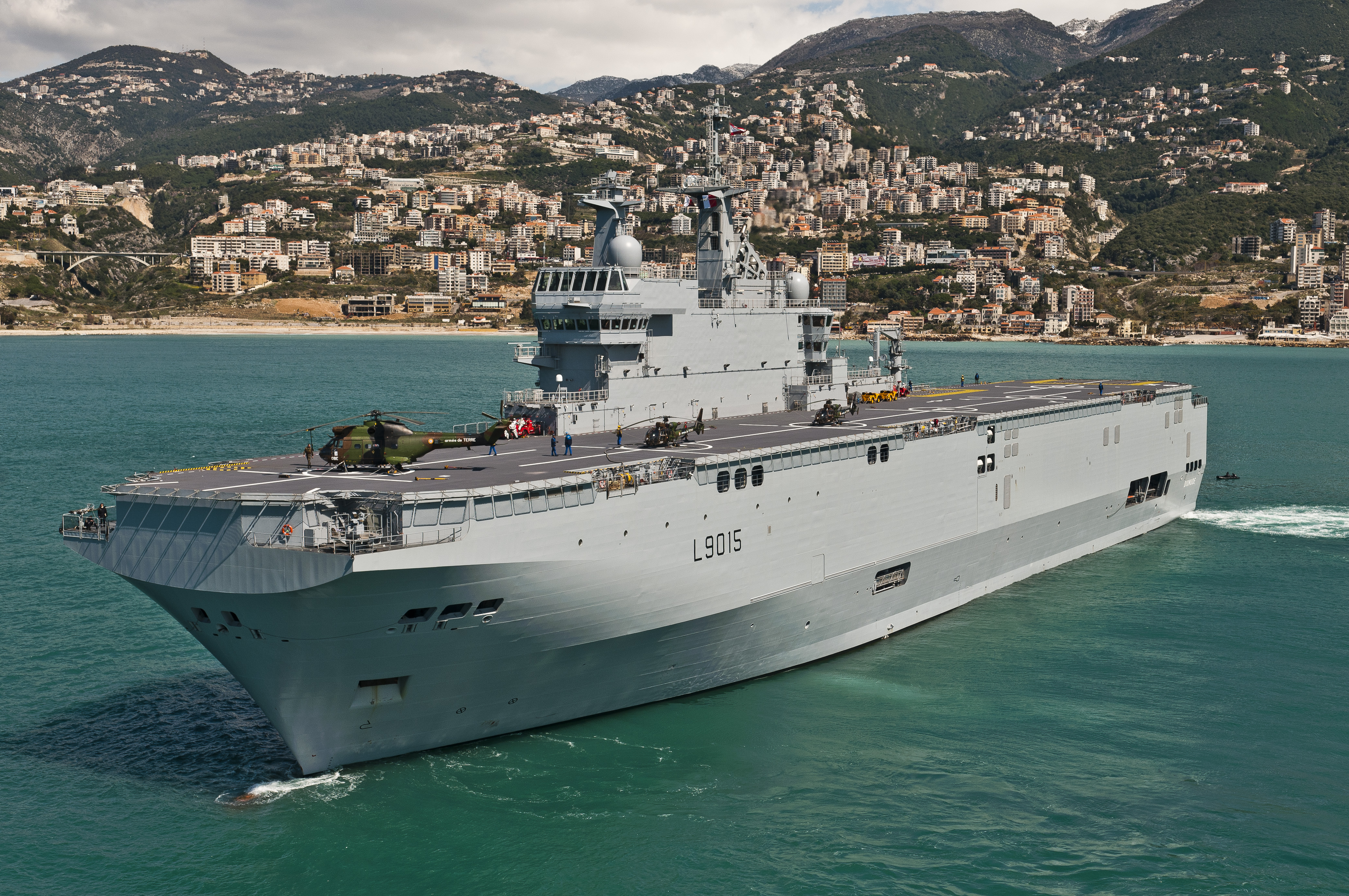
The French Navy Mistral-class amphibious assault ship Dixmude manoeuvering in Jounieh bay; the wake at the stern is perpendicular to the ship, indicating the use of her azimuth thrusters.

Primary advantages are maneuverability, electrical efficiency, better use of ship space, and lower maintenance costs. Ships with azimuth thrusters do not need tugboats to dock, though they may still require tugs to maneuver in difficult places.

The major disadvantage of azimuth drive systems is that a ship with azimuth drive maneuvers differently from one with a standard propeller and rudder configuration, necessitating specialized pilot training. Another disadvantage is they increase the draught of the ship.

== History ==
English inventor Francis Ronalds described what he called a propelling rudder in 1859 that combined the propulsion and steering mechanisms of a boat in a single apparatus. The propeller was placed in a frame having an outer profile similar to a rudder and attached to a vertical shaft that allowed the device to rotate in plane while spin was transmitted to the propeller.

The modern azimuth thruster using the Z-drive transmission was invented in 1951 by Joseph Becker, the founder of Schottel in Germany, and marketed as the Ruderpropeller. Becker was awarded the 2004 Elmer A. Sperry Award for the invention. This kind of propulsion was first patented in 1955 by Pleuger.

In the late 1980s Wärtsilä Marine, Strömberg and the Finnish National Board of Navigation developed the Azipod thruster with the motor located in the pod itself.

== See also ==
- Pleuger rudder – Thruster assisted ship's rudder
- Cyclorotor – Perpendicular-axis marine propulsion system
- Voith Schneider Propeller – Proprietary marine propulsion system
- Saildrive – Non-steerable propeller drive leg
- Z-drive – Steerable marine drive system
- Outboard motor – Self-contained propulsion system for boats
