= Navy Region Northwest =

One of eleven naval regions of the U.S. Navy

Commander, Navy Region Northwest Navy Region Northwest
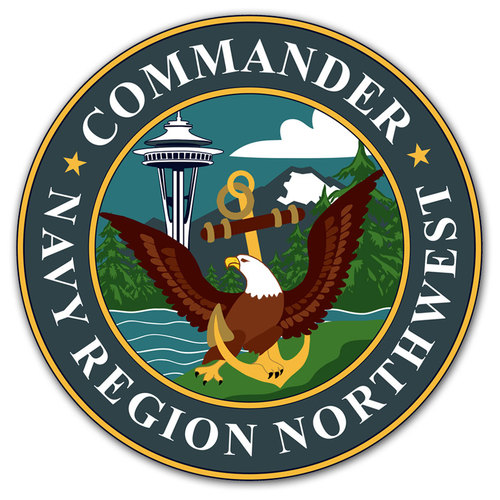
- Command insignia of Navy Region Northwest
- Active: 1999 - present
- Country: United States
- Branch: United States Navy
- Type: Region Commander
- Role: Management of installations in the Pacific Northwest
- Part of: Naval Installations Command
- HQ: Naval Base Kitsap
- Nickname: CNRNW
- Website: cnrnw.cnic.navy.mil

Commanders
- Current commander: RDML Jonathan Townsend

The Navy Region Northwest is one of several United States Navy Regions responsible to Commander, Navy Installations Command for the operation and management of Naval shore installations in Alaska, Washington, Oregon, Idaho, Montana, Wyoming, North Dakota, South Dakota, Nebraska, Minnesota, and Iowa.

The Commander oversees the assigned shore organization and provides facilities and space management, exercise coordination, and support to homeported and transient ships, submarines, and aircraft as well as afloat and ashore tenants, military and family members.

Puget Sound is the U.S. Navy’s third largest fleet concentration area. The major Northwest installations are Naval Air Station Whidbey Island, Naval Station Everett, and Naval Base Kitsap (which includes Puget Sound Naval Shipyard, Submarine Base Bangor, Naval Undersea Warfare Center - Keyport, Manchester Fuel Depot, and Naval Magazine Indian Island). The Department of the Navy spends about $5.3 billion annually in the Northwest Region area, which is home to approximately 21,000 active duty service members, 16,000 civilian employees, 6,000 drilling reservists, 40,000 family members, and 35,000 Navy retirees.

It is headquartered on Naval Base Kitsap on the former grounds of Naval Submarine Base Bangor, and is commanded by RDML Jonathan Townsend.

== Subordinate Commands ==
As an Echelon III Commander, Commander, Navy Region Northwest reports directly to the Commander, Naval Installations Command for the operation and readiness of the following subordinate commands/installations:

- Naval Air Station Whidbey Island
- Naval Base Kitsap
- Naval Magazine Indian Island
- Naval Station Everett
