= J. M. Martinac Shipbuilding Corporation =

J. M. Martinac Shipbuilding Corp.
- Type: Private
- Industry: shipbuilding
- Founded: 1924
- Headquarters: Tacoma, Washington, U.S.
- Products: Tugs, fishing vessels, yachts, naval patrol boats
- Website: martinacship.com

The J. M. Martinac Shipbuilding Corporation was founded in 1924 by Joseph M. Martinac on the Thea Foss Waterway in Tacoma, Washington. It specialized in the construction of tugs, trawlers, purse seiners, ferries, naval patrol craft and power yachts up to 250 feet (76 m) long.

== History ==
=== 20th century ===
Before 1942, the production was centered on the manufacture of fishing vessels constructed of wood. In 1942, because of the need for wooden-hulled minesweepers for the war effort, the U.S. Navy contracted for 12 YMS-type sweepers which were delivered between July 1942 and November 1943. Delivery of 4 YT-type tugs was accomplished during 1944. An additional 4 minesweepers of the YMS-type were delivered to the Navy in 1945.

Post war production was devoted to the manufacture of yachts, passenger and cargo ships until 1954 when the Navy needed more minesweepers. A total of 9 MSO-type minesweepers were produced from May 1954 to April 1956. In 1963 production was started on 5 patrol boats for the South Vietnamese Navy of the PGM-type. Most production since 1964 has concentrated on fishing vessels and tugs. The largest contract awarded to Martinac was for the manufacture of 26 patrol boats for the U.S. Coast Guard of the WPB-type. Production started in early 1966 and was completed by August 1967.

=== 21st century ===
J.M. Martinac Shipbuilding was sold in a foreclosure auction on Friday, July 18, 2014.

== Facilities ==
The company was located on a 6-acre (24,000 m^{2}) site with 3 fully enclosed construction ways accommodating vessels up to 260 feet (79 m) long and with a beam of 48 feet (15 m). The outfitting dock accommodated a vessel up to 400 feet (120 m) long and 20 feet (6.1 m) deep.
