= Schottel (company) =

Business manufacturing propulsion and steering systems for ships and offshore application

- Company type: GmbH
- Industry: Industrial machinery, Mechanical engineering
- Founded: 1921
- Founder: Josef Becker
- Headquarters: Spay, Germany
- Area served: Worldwide
- Key people: Dr. Christian Strahberger (CEO)
- Products: azimuth thrusters and marine propulsion, manoeuvring systems, steering systems
- Revenue: €UR 343 million (2014)
- Number of employees: approx. 1200
- Website: schottel.com

Schottel is a manufacturer of propulsion and steering systems for ships and offshore applications. The company founder Josef Becker invented the rudderpropeller, a z-drive, in 1950. Today the company develops and manufactures azimuth propulsion, maneuvering and steering systems. In 2014 the subsidiary Schottel Hydro was founded to bundle up the company activities in the hydrokinetic energy segment.

== History ==
=== Early beginnings ===
In 1921 Josef Becker (1897–1973) founded his craftsman's enterprise in an old farmhouse in Spay on the Rhine. In 1925 he designed and built his first shallop, followed by the first motorboat in 1928. In the mid 1930s Becker bought part of the present-day company premises and founded Schottel Werft. He named his enterprise after a section of the river Rhine which is called Auf der Schottel and located close by in Osterspai.

=== From shipyard to ship propulsion ===
With the beginning of the 1950s Becker started working on his invention, a ship propeller that is steerable through 360 degrees. In 1951 the company's own motorboat was equipped with the first Schottel Rudderpropeller, which Becker called SRP. Soon, the rudderpropeller was known as a propulsion unit for small fast patrol craft for the German police and government. At the end of this decade Schottel opened its first subsidiary abroad in the Netherlands. In 1967, Janus, the first tractor tug equipped with two rudderpropellers, was launched in Hamburg.

The next Schottel propulsion system was launched in 1978: The Schottel Pump Jet was designed for operation in shallow waters and installed flush with a vessel's hull. In 1996 the portfolio expanded with the Schottel Twin Propeller, a twin version of the rudderpropeller. In 2003, the Schottel Combi Drive was established with an electric motor which is vertically integrated into the support tube of the rudderpropeller. In 1998 Schottel opened a new production plant in Suzhou, China. The following year, Schottel acquired WPM Wismarer Propeller-und Maschinenbau GmbH which was merged in the newly founded Schottel Schiffsmaschinen and a new Schottel GmbH office in Wismar. Schottel expands its production capacities in Dörth, an industrial park surrounding the Schottel headquarters in Spay. In summer 2015, 23,000 m^{2} (250,000 sq ft) of production and office space will be available.

== Schottel worldwide ==
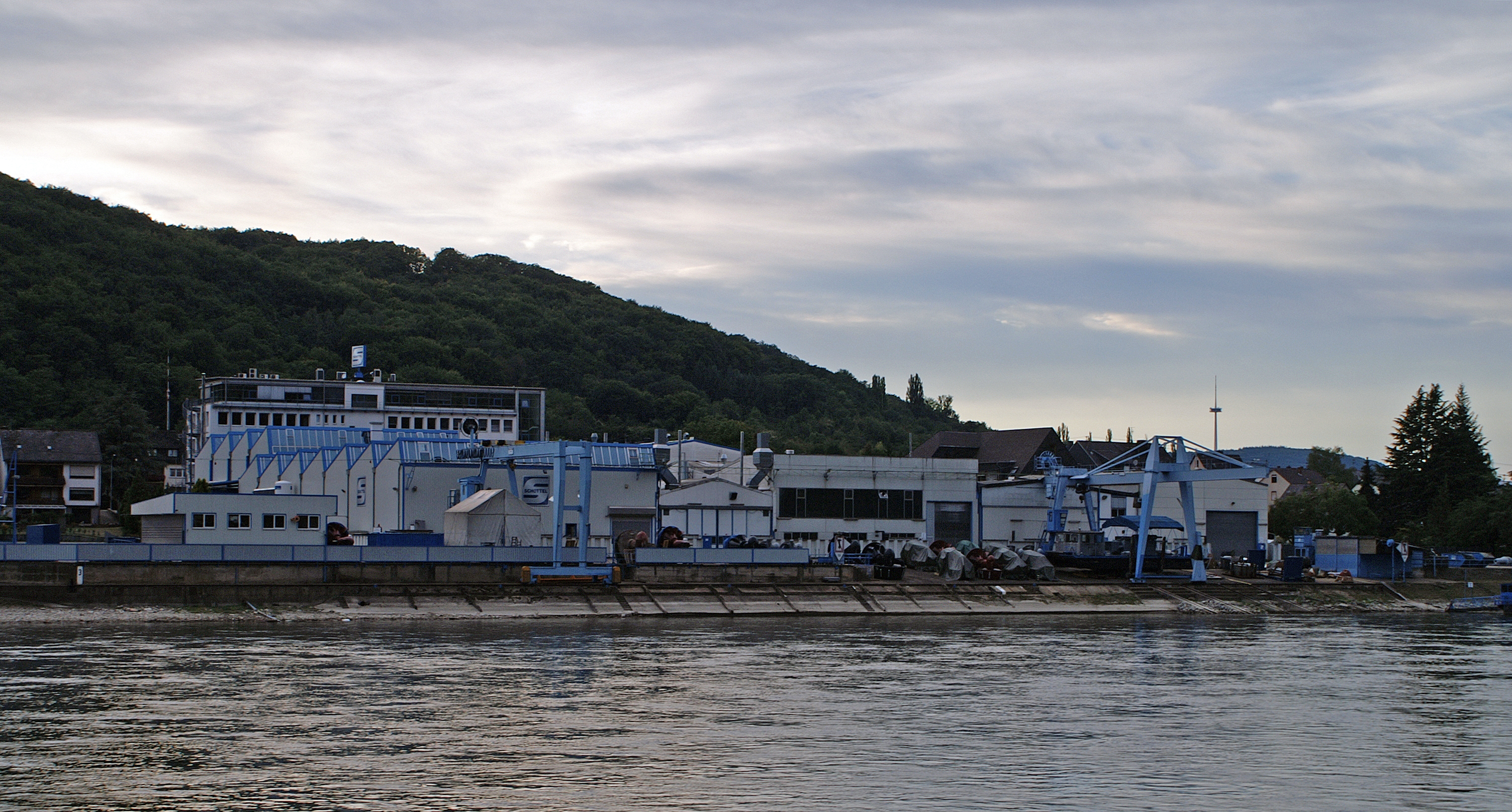
Schottel headquarters Spay

Schottel GmbH has its headquarters in Spay, two German subsidiaries in Hamburg and Wismar, and a network of subsidiary agencies in several countries and regions.

=== Schottel subsidiaries ===
- Schottel Nederland, 1958
- Schottel US, 1961
- Schottel France, 1971
- Schottel Far East, 1976
- Schottel do Brasil, 1975
- Schottel Suzhou Propulsion, China, 1998
- Schottel Schiffsmaschinen (formerly known as Wismarer Propeller Maschinen), 1999
- Schottel Russia, 2011
- Schottel Middle East, 2011
- Schottel Suzhou Trading & Service, 2011
- Schottel Australia, 2013
- Frydenbø Schottel Nordic, 2013
- Schottel de Colombia, 2014
- Schottel Hydro, Germany, 2014

== Core business ==
Since Schottel developed the first Z-drive in the 1950s the product portfolio has been extended by a range of thruster types (selection).

=== The Schottel Rudderpropeller ===
The idea of the rudderpropeller was the result of Becker's thoughts about the propulsion plants that took up too much space on board. He was looking for a system that could be installed space-efficiently with good maneuvering properties and developed a Z-drive system with a propeller that could be endlessly steered through 360 degrees. A classic application for rudderpropellers is tugs as the example of Janus shows. The first tractor tug was commissioned in 1967 in the Port of Hamburg. It was equipped with two Schottel Rudderpropellers in the front third of the vessel.

The Schottel Rudderpropeller is used in almost any kind of vessel from offshore vessels to tugs. It is available as a fixed pitch or controllable-pitch propeller. It is also available as a hydraulically retractable system for open-water service, dynamic positioning or varying water depths and underwater mountable thruster for ships that need to reduce docking times.

In 2014 Schottel introduced a rudderpropeller with an additional electric motor (PTI - power take in) as a hybrid propulsion concept. Here, the electric motor suffices for partial-load duties, the diesel engine is employed for operation at greater load, and the electric motor can be switched on to provide additional power. The PTI and diesel engine are centrally-controlled as a single system. This thruster is installed in the tug Eddy, built by Holland Shipyard.

=== The Schottel Twin Propeller ===
The demand for increasing power ratings could first be answered with larger rudderpropellers. Limits were set to this trend by mechanical stress and the fact that with an increasing propeller diameter, the draft of the vessel inevitably increases. Schottel therefore developed a thruster where the required power is divided between two counter-rotating thrusters that share a single shaft. The Twin Propeller is equipped with a pull propeller and a push propeller. The vortex street of the front pull propeller passes between the blades of the rear push propeller without impeding it. Contraction of the slip stream in the pull propeller means that more water reaches the push propeller from the sides. The strut is equipped with a fin, thus the swirl energy generated in the propeller stream is recovered. Additionally, the flow around the fins creates a lift component in the thrust direction, which has a thrust-enhancing effect.

=== The Schottel Combi Drive ===
The Combi Drive is based on the Schottel Rudderpropeller and combines its characteristics with the principle of an electric drive. The Combi Drive exists in both single and twin propeller versions. Instead of an above-water gearbox, the electric motor is integrated into the vertical shaft of the thruster. In combination with a power management system, electric drives increase the efficiency of the propulsion system and reduce fuel consumption. Electric energy generation systems produce only the power currently required and distribute it to the various consumers.

=== The Schottel Pump Jet ===
Schottel developed the Pump Jet for shallow waters. It is also used as an additional maneuvering aid for main propulsion or as a redundant auxiliary propulsion unit. An impeller sucks in water from under the hull and forces it into a pump housing. The outlet nozzles are integrated into an azimuthing base plate which is installed flush with the hull.

=== The Schottel Controllable Pitch Propeller ===
Schottel Controllable Pitch Propellers can be used in several vessel types like bigger ferries, container ships, heavy lift vessels or offshore supply vessels. The power spectrum includes application up to 30 MW (40,000 hp). The propeller diameters vary between 1.5 and 8.0 m (4 ft 11 in and 26 ft 3 in). Unlike a conventional fixed pitch propeller, the blades can be rotated and change their pitches variably from zero thrust to headway or reversing.

=== The Schottel Transverse Thruster ===
Transverse Thrusters are installed in the bow or stern of a vessel in order to improve maneuverability. Depending on the type of vessel, the range of application for Transverse Thrusters extends from harbor maneuvering to positioning tasks offshore. The units can be installed either with a horizontal or vertical motor flange.

== Schottel Hydro ==
Schottel Hydro bundles up the hydrokinetic energy business of Schottel. The subsidiary comprises activities in three segments: instream turbines for river and tidal currents, semi-submerged platforms and components, such as turbine hubs and drives. The hydrokinetic turbines have a rotor diameter between 3 and 5 m (9.8 and 16.4 ft) and produce between 54 and 70 kW (72 and 94 hp). Turbines can be combined to meet higher power demands.

In 2016, Schottel Hydro and its subsidiaries planned to install a tidal turbine array named TRITON in the Bay of Fundy, Canada. In 2017, Schottel Hydro scaled down its Bay of Fundy operations, going from the planned large turbine array to a smaller tidal platform made by Scottish company Sustainable Marine, which was deployed in 2019. Schottel Hydro and Sustainable Marine merged later in 2019 and continued working in the Bay of Fundy until 2023, when the project was shut down.

== Selected projects ==
| Year of construction | Name | Product | Owner/ Operator | Additional Information |
|---|---|---|---|---|
| 2014 | Bhagwan Dryden | 2x STP 550 | Australia Bhagwan Marine | dive support vessel |
| 2013 | Vidar | 4x SCD 2020; 3x STT 3030 | Germany HOCHTIEF Solutions AG | construction vessel |
| 2013 | Connor Bordelon | 2x SRP 1215; 2x STT 2 | United States Bordelon Marine | offshore supply vessel |
| 2013 | Starnav Perseus | 2x SCD 2020; 2x STT 2 | Brazil Starnav | platform supply vessel |
| 2012 | GPC Barú | 2x SRP 1515 | Colombia SPR Cartagena | azimuth stern driven tug |
| 2013 | Sl Jamba | 2x SRP 1515 | Singapore Smit Lamnalco | azimuth stern driven tug |
| 2013 | Cerro Itamut | 2x SRP 2020 | Panama Panama Canal Authority | tractor tug |
| 2013 | HOS Red Dawn | 2x SRP 2020; 2x STT 4 | United States Hornbeck Offshore Services | offshore supply vessel |
| 2012 | Lolland | 4x STP 550 | Denmark Faergen | double-ended ferry |
| 2012 | Starnav Perseus | 2x SCD 2020; 2x STT 2 | Brazil Starnav | platform supply vessel |
| 2011 | Bibby Tethra | 2x SPJ 57 RD | United Kingdom Osiris Projects | research vessel |
| 2010 | Calovébora | 2x SRP 1515 | Panama Panama Canal Authority | ASD tug |
| 2010 | Baltic | 2x SCP 100-4XG; 4x STT | Germany Fairplay Schleppdampfschiffs-Reederei Richard Borchard GmbH | salvage tug of the German Federal Ministry of Transport and Digital Infrastructure |
| 2009 | Adriaan | 3x SRP 1215 | Netherlands Kotug International BV | rotor tug |
| 2007 | Janus | 2x SCP 119-4XG; 3x STT 330 T-LK CP | Germany Harms Bergung GmbH & Co. KG | anchor handling tug |
| 2005 | SyltExpress | 2x STP 1212 | Germany Förde Reederei Seetouristik | Double-ended ferry |
| 2004 | Empress of the North | 2x STP 1212; 1x SPJ 220 | United States Majestic America Line | paddle steamer |
| 2004 | RheinEnergie | 2x STP 440 | Germany Köln-Düsseldorfer Deutsche Rheinschiffahrt | excursion ship |
| 2004 | Arkona | 2x SSP 2; 1x SPJ 220 | Germany Wasser- und Schifffahrtsamt Stralsund | multipurpose vessel |
| 2001 | Peter Pan | 2x SSP 10 | Germany TT-Line GmbH und Co. KG | RoPax-ferry |
| 1999 | Fairplay 25 | 2x SRP 1515 CPP | Germany Fairplay Reederei GmbH | ASD tug (bollard pull: 65 t) |
| 1998 | Berlin | 2x SCP 141-4XG | Germany German Navy | combat supply vessel |
| 1997 | Neuwerk | 2x SRP 3030; 1x SPJ 520 | Germany Federal Ministry of Transport and Digital Infrastructure | multipurpose vessel |
| 1996 | Goethe | 1x SPJ 57; 1x STT 060 | Germany Köln-Düsseldorfer Deutsche Rheinschiffahrt | paddle steamer |
| 1988 | M-Boot 3 | 2x SPJ 55 M | Germany German Army | multipurpose vessel for the German army |
| 1986 | Saipem 7000 | 4x SRP 4500 | Italy Micoperi Srl / Saipem S.p.A. | biggest available SRP thruster in 1986 (4500 kW) |
| 1955 | Stadt Boppard | 1x SRP; 1x NAV | Germany Family Deleu | Ferry construction year 1892, conversion 1955 |

== Awards ==
In 2004 the Elmer A. Sperry Award was given posthumously to Schottel founder Josef Becker for the invention of the propeller.
