= Z-drive =

Steerable marine drive system

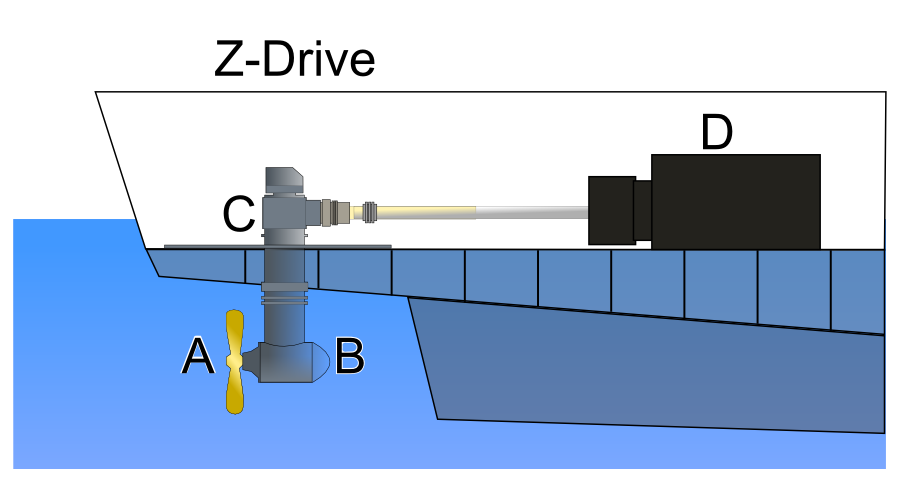
Azimuth thruster

A Z-drive is a type of marine propulsion unit. Specifically, it is an azimuth thruster. The pod can rotate 360 degrees, allowing for rapid changes in thrust direction and thus vessel direction. This eliminates the need for a conventional rudder.

The Z-drive is so named because of the appearance (in cross section) of the mechanical driveshaft or transmission configuration used to connect the mechanically supplied driving energy to the Z-drive azimuth thruster device. This form of power transmission is called a Z-drive because the rotary motion has to make two right-angle turns, thus resembling the letter "Z". This name is used to differentiate the arrangement of drive to that of the L-drive. It does not refer to an electric motor in a rotating pod.

The device differs from a cyclorotor, which can also quickly change the direction of thrust, as the Z-drive uses a shrouded conventional screw that pivots or rotates the propeller, unlike the variable-geometry blades of a cyclorotor.

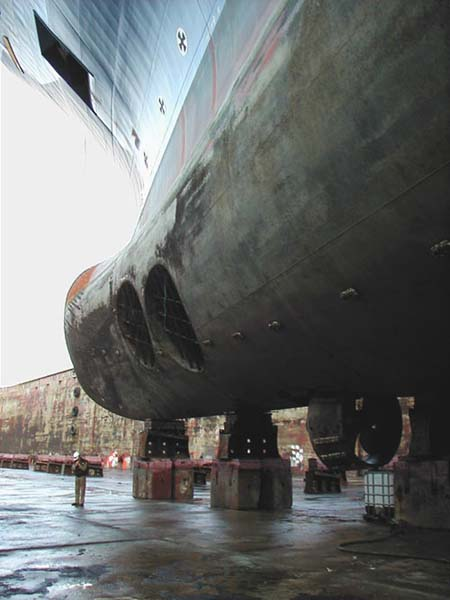

== Origins ==
The Z-drive transmission was invented in 1950 by Joseph Becker, the founder of Schottel, and used in the first azimuth thrusters built by Schottel GmbH in Germany in the 1960s under the Schottel brand name and referred to as RudderPropeller ever since. Joseph Becker was awarded the Elmer A. Sperry Award for this invention as a major contribution to the improvement of transportation worldwide.

== Types ==
- Counter-rotating
- Integrally installed/hull installation
- Deck mounted outboard
- Retractable

== Applications ==
- Floating dredger
- Tank ship – Ship designed to transport liquids or gases in bulk
- Coastal trading vessel – Shallow-hulled ships used for trading with ports along the same shoreline (coasters)
- Platform supply vessel – Ship used to supply offshore platforms
- Passenger ship – Watercraft intended to carry people on board
- Patrol boat – Small naval vessel
- Ferry – Ship to carry people and goods on water
- Fishing trawler – Commercial vessel designed to operate fishing trawls
- Cargo ship – Ship or vessel that carries goods and materials
- Self-propelled pontoon
- Barge – Watercraft
- Yacht – Recreational boat or ship
- Tugboat – Boat that maneuvers other vessels by pushing or towing them

== See also ==
- Saildrive – Non-steerable propeller drive leg, a Z-drive with fixed azimuth, for sailboats
- Propulsor – Mechanical device to propel a vessel
- Voith Schneider propeller – Perpendicular-axis marine propulsion system
- L-drive
- Ducted propeller – Marine propeller with a non-rotating nozzle
- Sterndrive – Type of boat engine
- Propulsion – Means of creating force leading to movement
