= List of ships built at Hietalahti shipyard (401 onwards) =

This is the list of ships built at Hietalahti shipyard in Helsinki, Finland, from yard number 401 onwards.

Name(s)	Year	Type (as built)	Yard no.	IMO number	Status	Notes	Image	Ref
Urho	1975	Icebreaker	401	7347615	In service	Three Atle-class icebreakers (Atle, Frej and Ymer) for the Swedish Maritime Administration and two Urho-class icebreakers (Urho and Sisu) for the Finnish National Board of Navigation.		
Atle	1974	Icebreaker	402	7347627	In service			
Sisu	1976	Icebreaker	403	7359656	In service			
Ale	1973	Icebreaker	404	7347639	In service			
Teuvo (1975–1985); Aatos (1985–1993); Mega (1993–2022); Mega II (2022–present)	1975	Harbour icebreaker	405	7347641	In service	Rebuilt into a pusher-tug in 1993.		
Frej	1975	Icebreaker	406	7359668	In service			
Finnjet (1977–2008); Da Vinci (2008); Kingdom (2008)	1977	Cruiseferry	407	7359632	Broken up			
Kapitan M. Izmaylov	1976	Icebreaker	408	7406318	In service	Sister ships: Kapitan Kosolapov and Kapitan A. Radzhabov.		
Kapitan Kosolapov	1976	Icebreaker	409	7406320	In service			
Kapitan A. Radzhabov	1976	Icebreaker	410	7406332	Laid up	Reportedly laid up in Baku since the 1990s.		
Kapitan Sorokin	1977	Icebreaker	411	7413488	In service	Refitted with Thyssen-Waas bow in 1991. Sister ships: Kapitan Nikolaev, Kapitan Dranitsyn and Kapitan Khlebnikov.		
Kapitan Nikolaev	1978	Icebreaker	412	7413490	In service	New bow in 1990.		
Ymer	1977	Icebreaker	413	7505346	In service			
Kapitan Chechkin	1977	River icebreaker	414	8878104	In service	A series of six river icebreakers for the Soviet Union. Sister ships: Kapitan Plakhin, Kapitan Chadaev, Kapitan Krutov, Kapitan Bukaev and Kapitan Zarubin.		
Kapitan Plakhin	1977	River icebreaker	415	8878099	In service			
Kapitan Chadaev	1978	River icebreaker	416	8434257	In service			
Kapitan Krutov	1978	River icebreaker	417	8434269	In service			
Kapitan Bukaev	1978	River icebreaker	418	8434271	In service			
Kapitan Zarubin	1978	River icebreaker	419	8434283	In service			
Almirante Irízar	1978	Icebreaker	420	7533628	In service	Damaged by fire on 10 April 2007 and returned to service in 2017.		
Pohjanmaa (1979–2016); Pohjanmeri (2016–present)	1979	Minelayer	421	4542642	In service	Refit in 1996–1998 and 2007. Decommissioned in 2013 and sold to a private company in 2016 to be converted to a survey vessel.		
Emba	1980	Cable layer	422	7807378	In service	A series of three cable ships for the Soviet Union. Sister ships: Nepryadva and Setun.		
Stroptivyy (1979–1992); Jupiteris (1992–1995); Vejas (1995); Hua Xiang (1995–2008); YM Shanghai (2008–2012)	1979	Salvage tug	423	7808267	Broken up	A series of five icebreaking salvage vessels built for the Soviet Union. Sister ships: Spravedlivyy, Stakhanovets, Suvorovets and Sibirskiy.		
Spravedlivyy	1980	Salvage tug	424	7808279	In service			
Stakhanovets	1980	Salvage tug	425	7808281	Laid up	Classification withdrawn in January 2012; vessel laid up in Murmansk		
Suvorovets	1980	Salvage tug	426	7808293	In service			
Sibirskiy	1980	Salvage tug	427	7808308	In service			
Helsinki	1981	Missile boat	428		Broken up	Four Helsinki-class missile boats built for the Finnish Navy in 1981–1986. Helsinki and Turku were decommissioned in 2002 and used for testing purposes before they were scrapped in 2011.		
Kapitan Dranitsyn	1980	Icebreaker	429	7824405	In service			
Kapitan Khlebnikov	1981	Icebreaker	430	7824417	In service			
Song of America (1982–1999); Sunbird (1999–2005); Thomson Destiny (2005–2012); Louis Olympia (2012–2014); Celestyal Olympia (2014–2024); Bella Fortuna (2024–2025); Fortu (2025)	1982	Cruise ship	431	7927984	Broken up			
Travemünde (1981–1987); Travemünde Link (1987–1988); Sally Star (1988–1997); Thjelvar (1997–2004); Color Traveller (2004–2006); Thjelvar (2006–2007); Rostock (2007–2010); Thjelvar (2010–2011); Betancuria (2011–2012); Wasa Express (2012–present)	1981	Ro-pax ferry	432	8000226	In service			
Larus	1981	Air cushion vehicle	433			Larus was an experimental hovercraft built to transport passengers and cargo in the Finnish archipelago in wintertime. The vessel did not fulfill expectations and was briefly used to break up ice dams in north before she was sold to Canada for Tuktoyaktuk-based Arctic Hovertrans Ltd. Later, she was reportedly transported to Singapore.		
Nepryadva	1981	Cable layer	434	8006830	In service			
Setun	1981	Cable layer	435	8006842	In service			
Mudyug	1982	Icebreaker	436	8009181	In service	Refitted with Thyssen-Waas bow at Nordseewerke, Germany, in 1986. Sister ships: Magadan and Dikson.		
Magadan	1982	Icebreaker	437	8009193	In service			
Dikson	1983	Icebreaker	438	8009208	In service			
Kapitan Evdokimov	1983	River icebreaker	439	8027224	In service	A series of eight river icebreakers for the Soviet Union. Sister ships: Kapitan Babichev, Kapitan Chudinov, Kapitan Borodkin, Avraamiy Zavenyagin, Kapitan Metsayk, Kapitan Demidov and Kapitan Moshkin.		
Kapitan Babichev	1983	River icebreaker	440	8027236	In service			
Kapitan Chudinov	1983	River icebreaker	441	8027248	In service			
Kapitan Borodkin	1983	River icebreaker	442	8027250	In service			
Avraamiy Zavenyagin	1984	River icebreaker	443	8027262	In service	Launched as Kapitan Krylov.		
Kapitan Metsayk	1984	River icebreaker	444	8027274	In service			
Kapitan Demidov	1984	River icebreaker	445	8027286	In service			
VP-1–VP-14	1982–1984	Air cushion vehicle	446–459			14 air cushion vehicles for SA-15 type Arctic cargo ships. Reportedly not used since the 1980s.		
Fobos (1983–2014); Foros (2014–present)	1983	Salvage tug	460	8119089	In service			
Deimos (1983–2002); Seaways 5 (2002–2008); Tsavliris Unity (2008–2016); Lira (2016)	1983	Salvage tug	461	8119091	Broken up			
Sabit Orujov	1983	Passenger ship	462	8128171	Broken up			
Aleksey Kortunov (1983–1992); General Asadov (1992–present)	1983	Passenger ship	463	8128183	In service			
Royal Princess (1984–2005); Artemis (2005–2011); Artania (2011–present)	1984	Cruise ship	464	8201480	In service			
Turku	1985	Missile boat	465		Broken up			
Sea Goddess I (1984–2000); Seabourn Goddess I (2000–2001); SeaDream I (2001–present)	1984	Cruise ship	466	8203438	In service			
Sea Goddess II (1985–2000); Seabourn Goddess II (2000–2001); SeaDream II (2001–present)	1985	Cruise ship	467	8203440	In service			
Oulu (1985–2008); Vukovar (2008–present)	1985	Missile boat	468		In service	Oulu and Kotka were sold to the Croatian Navy in 2008.		
Kotka (1986–2008); Dubrovnik (2008–present)	1986	Missile boat	469		In service			
Svea (1985–1992); Silja Karneval (1992–1994); Color Festival (1994–2008); Mega Smeralda (2008–present)	1985	Cruiseferry	470	8306486	In service	A series of two cruiseferries. Sister ship: Wellamo.		
Wellamo (1986–1991); Silja Festival (1991–2015); Mega Andrea (2015–present)	1986	Cruiseferry	471	8306498	In service			
Otso	1986	Icebreaker	472	8405880	In service	A series of two icebreakers for the Finnish National Board of Navigation. Sister ship: Kontio		
Kapitan Moshkin	1986	River icebreaker	473	8410160	In service			
Taymyr	1988	Nuclear-powered icebreaker	474	8417481	In service	Shallow-draft icebreakers Taymyr and her sister ship Vaygach are the only nuclear-powered icebreakers built outside Russia.		
Vaygach	1989	Nuclear-powered icebreaker	475	8417493	In service			
Biriusa	1986	Cable layer	476	8500020	In service	A series of two cable layers for the Soviet Navy; sister ship: Kemj.		
Kemj	1986	Cable layer	477	8500032	In service			
Kontio	1987	Icebreaker	478	8518120	In service			
Fantasy (1990–2007); Carnival Fantasy (2007–2020)	1990	Cruise ship	479	8700773	Broken up	Eight Fantasy-class cruise ships built for Carnival Cruise Lines in 1990–1998. Sister ships: Ecstasy, Sensation, Fascination, Imagination, Inspiration, Elation and Paradise.		
Ecstasy (1991–2007); Carnival Ecstasy (2007–2022)	1991	Cruise ship	480	8711344	Broken up			
Aranda	1989	Research vessel	481	8802076	In service	Aranda was originally ordered from Oy Laivateollisuus Ab. After the company merged with Wärtsilä Marine and the shipyard in Turku was closed, the unfinished hull was towed to Helsinki for outfitting.		
Etisalat	1990	Cable layer	482	8900191	In service			
Arppe (1989–2008); Armanborg (2008–present)	1989	Tugboat	483	8959879	In service	Lengthened and converted to platform supply vessel for the Caspian Sea oil fields in 2008–2009.		
Sensation (1993–2007); Carnival Sensation (2007–2022)	1993	Cruise ship	484	8711356	Broken up			
Barfleur (1992–2012); Deal Seaways (2012); Barfleur (2012–present)	1992	Ro-pax ferry	485	9007130	In service			
Sahalin		Icebreaker	486	9014999	Never built	The vessel with the yard number 486 was ordered but the construction was never started.		
Fascination (1994–2007); Carnival Fascination (2007–2020); Century Harmony (2020–2021); Y Harmony (2021)	1994	Cruise ship	487	9041253	Broken up			
Imagination (1995–2007); Carnival Imagination (2007–2020)	1995	Cruise ship	488	9053878	Broken up			
Inspiration (1996–2007); Carnival Inspiration (2007–2020)	1996	Cruise ship	489	9087489	Broken up			
Röthelstein	1995	River icebreaker	490	8640234	In service	One of the first icebreakers to utilize the double acting ship principle.		
Elation (1998–2007); Carnival Elation (2007–present)	1998	Cruise ship	491	9118721	In service	First cruise ship in the world to be fitted with Azipod propulsion units.		
Grandeur of the Seas	1996	Cruise ship	492	9102978	In service			
Enchantment of the Seas	1997	Cruise ship	493	9111802	In service	Lengthened in 2005.		
Paradise (1998–2007); Carnival Paradise (2007–present)	1998	Cruise ship	494	9120877	In service			
Europa	1999	Cruise ship	495	9183855	In service			
Arcticaborg	1998	Platform supply vessel	496	9184976	In service			
Antarcticaborg (1998–2019); Georgiy Sedov (2019–present)	1998	Platform supply vessel	497	9184988	In service			
Costa Atlantica (2000–2023); Margaritaville at Sea Islander (2023–present)	2000	Cruise ship	498	9187796	In service	Six Spirit-class cruise ships built for Costa Cruises (2) and Carnival Cruise Lines (4) in 2000–2004. Sister ships: Carnival Spirit, Carnival Pride, Carnival Legend, Costa Mediterranea and Carnival Miracle.		
Carnival Spirit	2001	Cruise ship	499	9188647	In service			
Carnival Pride	2001	Cruise ship	500	9223954	In service			
Carnival Legend	2002	Cruise ship	501	9224726	In service			
Costa Mediterranea (2003–2023); Mediterranea (2023–present)	2003	Cruise ship	502	9237345	In service			
Carnival Miracle	2004	Cruise ship	503	9237357	In service			
FESCO Sakhalin (2005–2010); SCF Sakhalin (2010–present)	2005	Platform supply vessel	504	9307724	In service			
Norilskiy Nickel	2006	Arctic cargo ship	505	9330836	In service	Foreship built by Aker-Ostseewerft GmbH in Warnemünde, Germany, and towed to Helsinki.		
Star (2007–2023); Oscar Wilde (2023–2024); James Joyce (2024–present)	2007	Ro-pax ferry	1356	9364722	In service	Yard numbers 1356–1362 followed the numbering of ships built at Turku shipyard.		
Cotentin (2007–2013); Stena Baltica (2013–2020); Cotentin (2020–present)	2007	Ro-pax ferry	1357	9364978	In service			
Viking XPRS	2008	Cruiseferry	1358	9375654	In service			
Baltic Princess	2008	Cruiseferry	1361	9354284	In service	Forward section built at Chantiers de l'Atlantique, France, and towed to Helsinki.		
Armorique	2009	Ro-pax ferry	1362	9364980	In service			
Vitus Bering	2012	Platform supply vessel	506	9613549	In service	After change of ownership, Arctech Helsinki Shipyard continued the yard numbering of ships built at Hietalahti shipyard		
Aleksey Chirikov	2013	Platform supply vessel	507	9613551	In service			
Baltika	2014	Icebreaker	508	9649237	In service	Built in co-operation with Shipyard Yantar JSC from Yantar, Kaliningrad, Baltika is the first oblique icebreaker ever built.		
Murmansk	2015	Icebreaker	509	9658666	In service	Built in co-operation with Vyborg Shipyard.		
Polaris	2016	Icebreaker	510	9734161	In service			
Gennadiy Nevelskoy	2017	Platform supply vessel	511	9742120	In service			
Stepan Makarov	2017	Standby vessel	512	9753727	In service			
Fedor Ushakov	2017	Standby vessel	513	9753739	In service			
Yevgeny Primakov	2017	Standby vessel	514	9753741	In service			
Yuriy Kuchiev	2019	Gas condensate tanker	515	9804033	In service			
SH Minerva	2021	Cruise ship	516	9895240	In service			
SH Vega	2022	Cruise ship	517	9895252	In service			
SH Diana	2023	Cruise ship	518	9921740	In service			
		Icebreaker	519	9957804	Never built	The vessel with the yard number 519 was ordered but never built after the Ministry for Foreign Affairs refused to grant an export license for the vessel following Russia's invasion to Ukraine.		

== See also ==
- List of ships built at Hietalahti shipyard (1–200)
- List of ships built at Hietalahti shipyard (201–400)

== Bibliography ==
Haavikko, Paavo (1984). Wärtsilä 1834–1984. Oy Wärtsilä Ab. ISBN 951-99542-0-1.
