= Arctech Helsinki Shipyard =

Shipbuilding company in Helsinki, Finland

- Industry: Shipbuilding
- Predecessor: STX Finland
- Founded: 25 October 2010; 15 years ago
- Defunct: 2019
- Successor: Helsinki Shipyard (in Finland)
- Headquarters: Helsinki, Finland
- Products: Icebreakers, Arctic offshore vessels
- Revenue: ▲€125,498,000 (2019); €99,605,000 (2018)
- Net income: ▲€95,486,000 (2019); –€39,337,000 (2018)
- Owner: United Shipbuilding Corporation
- Number of employees: ▼178 (12/2019); 495 (12/2018)

Arctech Helsinki Shipyard was a Finnish shipbuilding company that focused primarily on icebreakers and other icegoing vessels for arctic conditions.

Between 2011 and 2019, Arctech Helsinki Shipyard built a total of 10 icebreaking vessels (yard numbers 506 through 515) at the Hietalahti shipyard in Helsinki, Finland. Due to the economic sanctions against its Russian owner, the company was forced to transfer its shipbuilding business in Finland to a successor company, Helsinki Shipyard, which was then sold to a private Russian owner.

== History ==
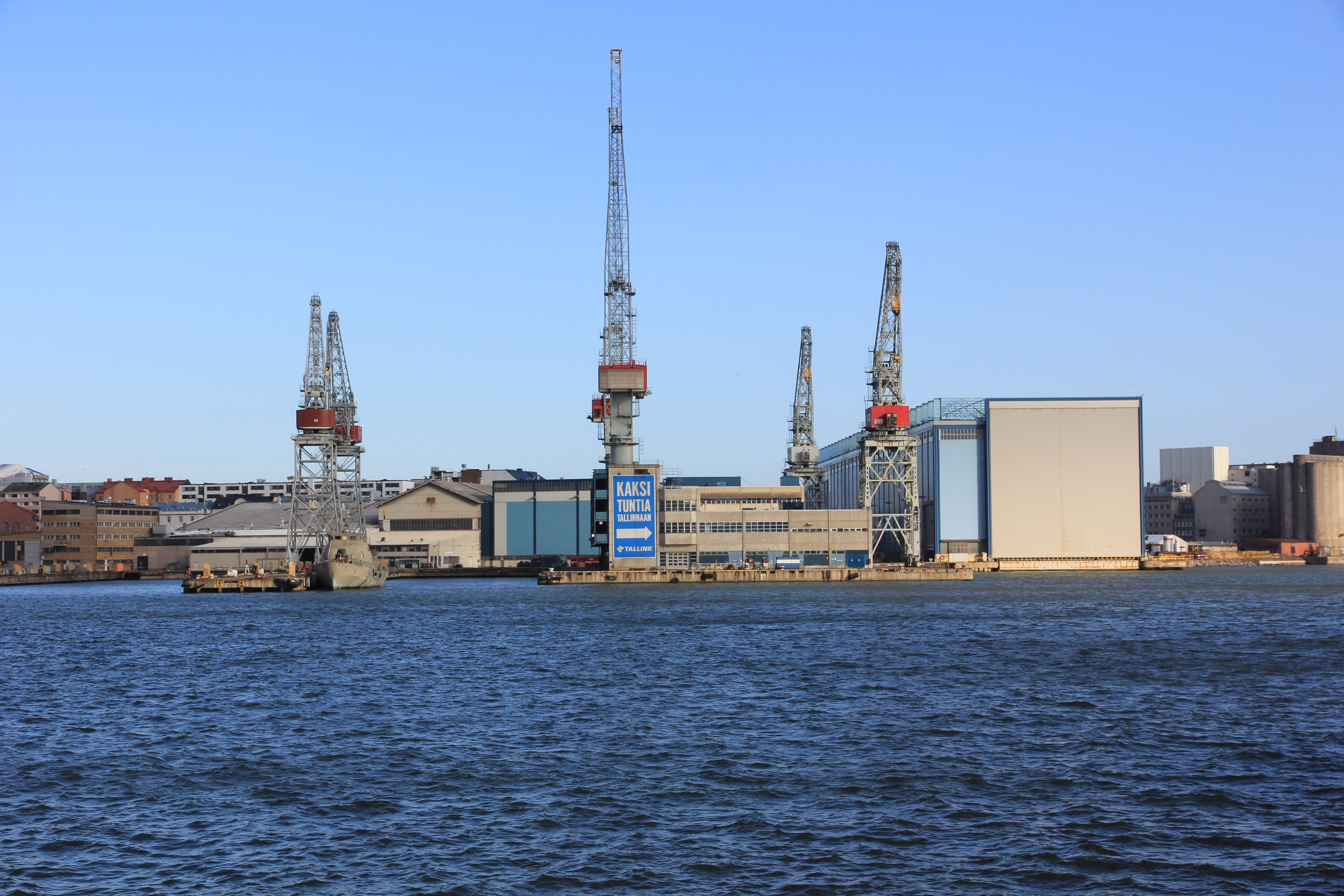
Hietalahti shipyard in May 2011, shortly after Arctech Helsinki Shipyard was established. The building on the right is the shipyard's covered Panamax-sized dry dock.

Arctech Helsinki Shipyard was established as a joint venture between STX Finland, a subsidiary of STX Europe, and the Russian state-owned United Shipbuilding Corporation (USC). The new shipbuilding company started its operations at the Hietalahti shipyard on 1 April 2011. On 28 October 2013, it was reported that USC was going to buy the remaining shares from STX Europe and become the sole owner of the company. The sale was finalized on 30 December 2014 and the United Shipbuilding Corporation has been the sole owner of Arctech Helsinki Shipyard since the beginning of 2015.

The Russian ownership has resulted in some issues due to the economic sanctions imposed by the European Union and the United States as a response to the Russian involvement in the unrest in Ukraine. In August 2014, the Nordic-based bank Nordea announced that it would terminate Arctech's accounts due to the financial sanctions imposed by the United States, forcing the shipyard to switch to another bank.

In early 2018, it was reported that the United Shipbuilding Corporation was looking for a new majority owner for Arctech Helsinki Shipyard in order to circumvent the sanctions. The Finnish shipyard, which had not received any new orders since 2016, had become an economic burden for the Russian owner with cumulative loss of 156 million euro in 2011–2015 after which the company stopped reporting its economic situation. Initially, it was reported that the Croatian investment corporation KERMAS Group would purchase a 55 percent share of Arctech Helsinki Shipyard with the USC remaining as a minority shareholder. However, in September 2018 the president of the United Shipbuilding Corporation, Aleksey Rakhmanov, stated that the company was instead negotiating the sale of the whole shipyard with three parties: a group of Norwegian companies, an unnamed Russian businessman, and the KERMAS Group which had previously declined partial ownership. In October 2018, it was announced that the shipyard would be sold to the owners of Nevsky Shipyard and, in addition to cash, the sale would include transferring the privately owned Saint Petersburg-based shipyard to the state-owned United Shipbuilding Corporation. While the initial deal fell through at the very last moment reportedly due to lack of approval from the Russian authorities, the sale was finally authorized by the Russian government in April 2019.

On 15 May 2019, Arctech Helsinki Shipyard officially announced the change of ownership of the shipbuilding activities in Finland by the end of the month. In preparation of the transaction, a new shipbuilding company Helsinki Shipyard was established to take over the assets and operations at Hietalahti Shipyard. It was then sold to Algador Holdings, a private Russian company owned by Rishat Bagautdinov ja Vladimir Kasyanenko, while Arctech would remain as a fully owned subsidiary of the United Shipbuilding Corporation and continue shipbuilding operations in Russia as a shareholder of the Nevsky Shipyard. Victor Olerskiy, the former deputy Russian transport minister and the former head of Federal Agency of Maritime and River Transportation, was appointed as the chairman of the board of the new company. The transaction, which included 35 million euro and 49.99% ownership of Nevsky Shipyard, was finalized on 20 May. In September 2024, The Moscow Court of Arbitration suspended Arctech's corporate rights in relation to Nevsky Shipyard following a request from the Russian Ministry of Industry and Trade.

== Orders ==
On 16 December 2010, Arctech Helsinki Shipyard received its first order when a contract for two icebreaking platform supply vessels similar to the SCF Sakhalin, worth US$100 million per ship, was signed with Sovcomflot. The vessels, Vitus Bering and Aleksey Chirikov, were delivered in December 2012 and April 2013, respectively.

On 8 December 2011, it was announced that Arctech Helsinki Shipyard had signed a contract together with Shipyard Yantar JSC from Yantar, Kaliningrad, for the construction of a 76 million euro icebreaking multipurpose emergency and rescue vessel for the Russian Ministry of Transport. The so-called "oblique icebreaker" would feature an asymmetric hull designed to break a 50-metre (160 ft) channel in 60-centimetre (2.0 ft) level ice when operating sideways. Initially, the hull was to be built at Yantar and then towed to Helsinki for outfitting, but in the end the hull was assembled in Helsinki from blocks manufactured in Kaliningrad. The vessel was launched on 12 December 2013 and given the name Baltika. After sea trials, the icebreaker was towed to Kaliningrad where she was to be handed over to the owner. However, Baltika was later towed to Saint Petersburg where she was delivered to Rosmorrechflot on 30 December 2014.

On 19 December 2012, Arctech Helsinki Shipyard received an order from the Russian Ministry of Transport for an 18-megawatt icebreaker capable of breaking ice up to 1.5 metres (5 ft) thick. The newbuilding, a Project 21900M icebreaker worth about 100 million euro, would be built in co-operation with the Vyborg Shipyard which was building two similar ships in Russia. The new icebreaker, Murmansk, was launched in March 2015. While the vessel was to be delivered to the owner in August of the same year, the delivery was delayed until December. On 18 December, Murmansk was towed to Vyborg Shipyard where it would be delivered to the owner before the year's end. The icebreaker was handed over to Rosmorport after a flag-raising ceremony on 25 December 2015.

On 27 November 2013, the Finnish Transport Agency announced that Arctech Helsinki Shipyard had won the tender for the next Finnish state-owned icebreaker and that the final order for the 123 million euro vessel would be signed before the end of the year. However, on 29 November the Finnish Transport Agency cancelled the contract, citing issues with guaranties offered by the shipyard. On 22 January 2014, Arctech Helsinki Shipyard won the second round of the tendering process and the final contract was signed on 14 February. The 19-megawatt vessel, the most powerful icebreaker ever to fly the Finnish flag, would be powered by dual-fuel engines running on liquefied natural gas (LNG) and designed to break 1.6-metre (5.2 ft) ice in a continuous motion. The vessel, based on Aker Arctic's Aker ARC 130 concept, was initially scheduled for delivery during the winter of 2016. On 11 December 2015, the new icebreaker was named Polaris. She was floated out from the covered dry dock and into the outfitting quay on 3 January 2016 and delivered on 28 September.

On 21 April 2014, Sovcomflot ordered an icebreaking platform supply vessel from Arctech Helsinki Shipyard. The 100 million euro vessel, which was initially scheduled to be delivered in June 2016, would be a further development of the two similar vessels delivered in 2012 and 2013. While the propulsion power and icebreaking capability would remain the same, the number of main engines was increased from four to six and the vessel would be been fitted with a moon pool. The vessel would be chartered to Sakhalin Energy Investment Company (SEIC). Steel production began at Vyborg Shipyard, which would produce the hull blocks for the vessel, on 26 November 2014. The keel of the vessel, Gennadiy Nevelskoy, was laid on 17 December 2015. On 30 June, the vessel was floated out in order to make space for laying the keel of the next vessel. The vessel was delivered on 3 March 2017, slightly behind schedule.

On 7 July 2014, the Finnish newspaper Turun Sanomat reported that Arctech Helsinki Shipyard had been awarded the construction of three icebreaking standby vessels for Sovcomflot. The shipyard confirmed the US$380 million order for three ships, initially scheduled for delivery between September 2016 and March 2017, in its own press release on 11 August 2014. Like the platform supply vessel ordered in April, the standby vessels would be chartered to Sakhalin Energy Investment Company (SEIC) and used in the Sakhalin-2 field for stand-by, rescue and oil spill response duties. The 100-metre (330 ft) vessels Stepan Makarov, Fedor Ushakov, and Yevgeny Primakov (initially Mikhail Lazarev) would have accommodation for 98 persons on board and be capable of operating independently in 1.7-metre (6 ft) ice. The keel of the first standby vessel was laid on 4 February 2016 alongside the previously ordered platform supply vessel. Some of the blocks were assembled in Klaipėda, Lithuania. The first vessel, Stepan Makarov, was floated out in November 2016 and delivered on 15 June 2017. She was followed by Fedor Ushakov on 27 October 2017. The third vessel, Yevgeny Primakov, was scheduled to be delivered before the year's end but didn't leave the shipyard until January 2018.

In early 2016, it was reported that the Greek shipowner Dynacom has ordered a 58,000 DWT condensate carrier from Arctech Helsinki Shipyard at an undisclosed price. The Arc7 ice class tanker would be used to carry gas condensate from the natural gas fields in the Yamal Peninsula. While the shipyard was initially reluctant to confirm the contract, the tanker was included in a presentation by Arctech CEO Esko Mustamäki at the Conference on the Economic Development of the Arctic in June 2016. According to the presentation material, the double acting tanker would be 229 metres (751 ft) long and capable of breaking 1.8-metre (5.9 ft) ice. The forward part of the vessel was built at Brodotrogir shipyard in Croatia. The keel-laying ceremony, which marks the start of hull assembly, was held in Helsinki on 27 July. The bow section of the vessel, named Yuriy Kuchiev, was launched on 16 July 2018 and arrived in Helsinki in August. With a beam of 32.5 metres (107 ft), the tanker is the widest vessel ever built at Helsinki Shipyard's Panamax-sized dry dock. In May 2019, it was announced that this vessel would be the last built by Arctech Helsinki Shipyard before the change of ownership. Yuriy Kuchiev was delivered in August 2019.

== List of ships ==
Ship name	Owner	Year	Type	Yard number	IMO number	Status	Notes	Image	Ref
Vitus Bering	Sovcomflot	2012	Platform supply vessel	506	9613549	In service			
Aleksey Chirikov	Sovcomflot	2013	Platform supply vessel	507	9613551	In service			
Baltika	Rosmorrechflot	2014	Icebreaker	508	9649237	In service	First oblique icebreaker ever built.		
Murmansk	Rosmorport	2015	Icebreaker	509	9658666	In service			
Polaris	Arctia	2016	Icebreaker	510	9734161	In service	First icebreaker in the world to be powered by liquefied natural gas.		
Gennadiy Nevelskoy	Sovcomflot	2017	Platform supply vessel	511	9742120	In service			
Stepan Makarov	Sovcomflot	2017	Standby vessel	512	9753727	In service			
Fedor Ushakov	Sovcomflot	2017	Standby vessel	513	9753739	In service			
Yevgeny Primakov	Sovcomflot	2018	Standby vessel	514	9753741	In service	Initially named Mikhail Lazarev prior to delivery.		
Yuriy Kuchiev	Dynacom	2019	Gas condensate tanker	515	9804033	In service	First tanker built at Hietalahti shipyard and the last ship built by Arctech Helsinki Shipyard in Finland.		
