= Vitus Bering (icebreaker) =

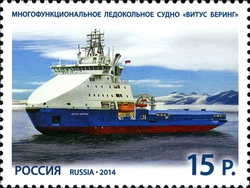

History

Russia
- Name: Vitus Bering (Витус Беринг)
- Namesake: Vitus Bering
- Owner: Dafne Line Shipping
- Operator: Sovcomflot
- Port of registry: Limassol, Cyprus (on delivery); 2012–: Saint Petersburg, Russia
- Ordered: 16 December 2010
- Builder: Arctech Helsinki Shipyard, Helsinki, Finland
- Cost: $100 million
- Yard number: 506
- Laid down: 19 January 2012
- Launched: 30 June 2012
- Completed: 21 December 2012
- Identification: Call sign: UBGJ9; IMO number: 9613549; MMSI number: 209441000
- Status: In service

General characteristics
- Type: Platform supply vessel
- Tonnage: 7,487 GT; 2,246 NT; 4,158 DWT
- Length: 99.9 m (328 ft) (overall); 94.02 m (308.5 ft) (waterline)
- Beam: 22.1 m (73 ft)
- Draught: 7.90 m (25.9 ft)
- Depth: 11.00 m (36.09 ft)
- Ice class: RMRS Icebreaker6
- Installed power: 2 × Wärtsilä 12V32 (2 × 6,000 kW); 2 × Wärtsilä 6L32 (2 × 3,000 kW)
- Propulsion: Two ABB Azipod VI1600 units (2 × 6.5 MW); Two bow thrusters
- Speed: 15 knots (28 km/h; 17 mph) (open water); 3 knots (5.6 km/h; 3.5 mph) in 1.5 m (4.9 ft) level ice
- Endurance: 30 days
- Capacity: 700 m^{2} cargo deck; 195 evacuees
- Crew: Accommodation for 50

Vitus Bering (Russian: Витус Беринг) is a Russian icebreaking platform supply and standby vessel owned by Sovcomflot. Built by Arctech Helsinki Shipyard in Helsinki, Finland, she and her sister ship, Aleksey Chirikov, were ordered on 16 December 2010, shortly after the joint venture agreement between STX Finland Cruise Oy and United Shipbuilding Corporation had been signed. Delivered to the owners on 21 December 2012, Vitus Bering is used in the Arkutun-Dagi offshore oil field in the Sea of Okhotsk.

== Construction ==
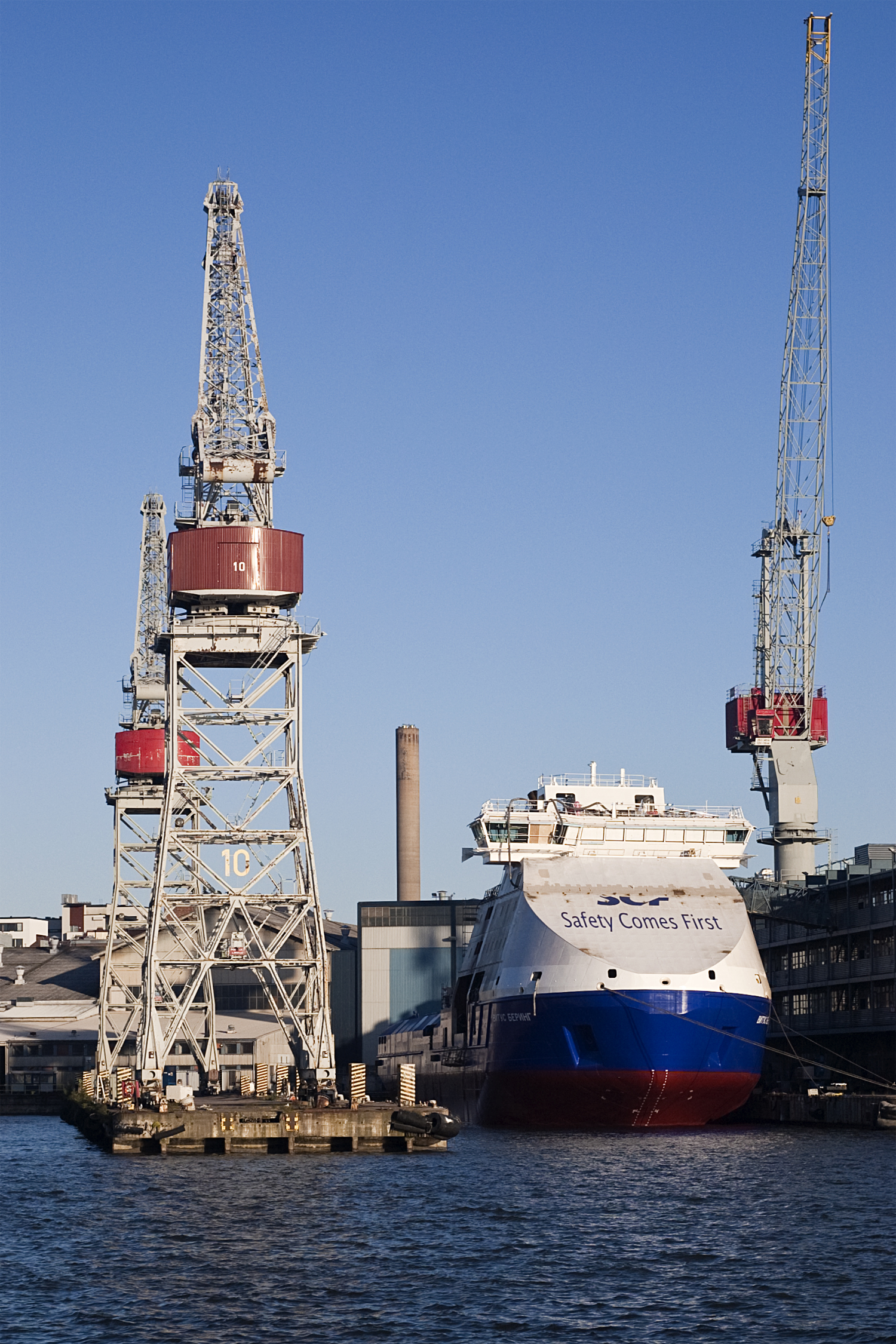
Vitus Bering under construction at Arctech Helsinki Shipyard

Only six days after the agreement for the formation of the company was signed between STX Finland Cruise Oy and United Shipbuilding Corporation on 10 December 2010, the newly founded Arctech Helsinki Shipyard received an order for two multipurpose icebreaking supply vessels from the Russian state-owned shipping company Sovcomflot. The value of the shipbuilding contract was US$200 million and the construction of the vessels would provide work for 1,000 man-years. Initially, the ships were to be delivered to the customer together in April 2013, after which they would be used for standby, supply and ice management of Berkut, an offshore platform operated by Exxon Neftegas Limited in the Arkutun-Dagi offshore oil field in the Sea of Okhotsk.

Although the ship was assembled at Arctech Helsinki Shipyard, the majority of the steel blocks were manufactured by the Russian Vyborg Shipyard as the Hietalahti shipyard no longer has such production capacity. Only five of the 42 hull blocks for the two vessels were manufactured locally in Helsinki to ramp up the production while the remaining blocks were produced and partially outfitted in Vyborg and then brought to Helsinki on a barge for final outfitting, painting and hull assembly. The steel-cutting ceremony for the first vessel was held at Vyborg Shipyard on 6 July 2011 and production began in Helsinki in August 2011.

The keel laying ceremony of the first vessel was held on 19 January 2012 when the first block, a 353-ton midship section manufactured in Helsinki, was lowered to the shipyard's covered drydock. Vitus Bering was launched and floated out on 30 June 2012. The hull assembly of the second vessel began in July and she was launched on 23 November 2012, one day after the first vessel left for one week sea trials. Vitus Bering was delivered to Sovcomflot on 21 December 2012, four months ahead of the original schedule. From Helsinki, she headed for St. Petersburg, where the new vessel was visited by president Vladimir Putin on 10 January 2013.

The ship is named after the Danish-born Russian explorer Vitus Bering who became the first European to discover Alaska.

== Technical details ==
Vitus Bering is an upgraded version of SCF Sakhalin, a similar icebreaking platform supply vessel built at Helsinki in 2005. Several modifications have been made to the original design, including adding a fourth main engine, but the hull form is nearly identical. The most noticeable external difference is the covered foredeck, which will protect the mooring equipment from icing.

Vitus Bering is 99.9 metres (328 ft) long overall. Her hull has a moulded breadth of 22.1 metres (73 ft) and depth of 11.00 metres (36.09 ft) to upper deck. When loaded to a draught of 7.90 metres (25.9 ft), the deadweight tonnage of the ship is 4,158 tons. The four Wärtsilä diesel generating sets — two twelve-cylinder 12V32 and two six-cylinder 6L32 engines — have a combined output of 18,000 kW (24,000 hp) and provide power for all shipboard consumers, including two 6.5 MW ABB Azipod VI1600 propulsion units. A double acting ship, Vitus Bering is designed to be able to break ice both ahead and astern. She is capable of operating in ice up to 1.7 metres (5.6 ft) thick and maintain a speed of 3 knots (5.6 km/h; 3.5 mph) in level ice with a thickness of 1.5 metres (4.9 ft). Her ice class, assigned by the Russian Maritime Register of Shipping, is Icebreaker6.
