= Aleksey Chirikov (icebreaker) =

History

Russia
- Name: Aleksey Chirikov
- Namesake: Aleksei Chirikov
- Operator: Sovcomflot
- Port of registry: Saint Petersburg, Russia
- Ordered: 16 December 2010
- Builder: Arctech Helsinki Shipyard, Helsinki, Finland
- Cost: $100 million
- Yard number: 507
- Laid down: 3 July 2012
- Launched: 23 November 2012
- Completed: 19 April 2013
- Identification: IMO number: 9613551; Call sign: UBXJ4; MMSI number: 273369290
- Status: In service

General characteristics
- Type: Platform supply vessel
- Tonnage: 7,487 GT; 2,246 NT; 4,191 DWT
- Length: 99.83 m (327.5 ft) (overall); 94.02 m (308.5 ft) (waterline)
- Beam: 21.20 m (69.6 ft) (moulded)
- Draught: 7.90 m (25.9 ft)
- Depth: 11.00 m (36.09 ft)
- Ice class: RMRS Icebreaker6
- Installed power: 2 × Wärtsilä 12V32 (2 × 6,000 kW); 2 × Wärtsilä 6L32 (2 × 3,000 kW)
- Propulsion: Two ABB Azipod VI1600 units (2 × 6.5 MW); Two bow thrusters
- Speed: 15 knots (28 km/h; 17 mph) (open water); 3 knots (5.6 km/h; 3.5 mph) in 1.5 m (4.9 ft) level ice
- Endurance: 30 days
- Capacity: 700 m^{2} cargo deck; 195 evacuees
- Crew: 50

Aleksey Chirikov is a Russian icebreaking platform supply and standby vessel owned by Sovcomflot. She and her sister ship, Vitus Bering, were ordered on 16 December 2010 from Arctech Helsinki Shipyard in Helsinki, Finland, shortly after the joint venture agreement between STX Finland Cruise Oy and United Shipbuilding Corporation had been signed. Aleksey Chirikov was delivered on 19 April 2013. She will be used in the Arkutun-Dagi offshore oil field in the Sea of Okhotsk.

== Construction ==
Only six days after the agreement for the formation of the company was signed between STX Finland Cruise Oy and United Shipbuilding Corporation on 10 December 2010, the newly founded Arctech Helsinki Shipyard received an order for two multipurpose icebreaking supply vessels from the Russian state-owned shipping company Sovcomflot. The value of the shipbuilding contract was US$200 million and the construction of the vessels would provide work for 1,000 man-years. Initially, both ships were set to be delivered to the customer in April 2013, after which they will be used for standby, supply and ice management of an offshore platform operated by Exxon Neftegas Limited in the Arkutun-Dagi offshore oil field, located in the Sea of Okhotsk.

Although the ship are constructed at Arctech Helsinki Shipyard, the majority of the steel blocks are manufactured by the Russian Vyborg Shipyard as the Hietalahti shipyard no longer has such production capacity. Only five of the 42 hull blocks for the two vessels will be manufactured locally in Helsinki while the remaining blocks will be produced and partially outfitted in Vyborg, and then brought to Helsinki on a barge for final outfitting, painting and hull assembly. The production of the second vessel was started in Helsinki on 2 November 2012.

The keel of the second vessel was laid down on 3 July 2012, only three days after the first vessel, Vitus Bering, had been floated out from the dry dock. Although initially set for the same delivery date in April 2013, Vitus Bering will be delivered four months ahead of schedule in December 2012. She left for sea trials on 22 November 2012, and on the following day the second vessel, Aleksey Chirikov, was floated out from the dry dock. She left for four-day sea trials on 19 March 2013. Another sea trial was conducted in early April 2013 and Aleksey Chirikov was delivered to Sovcomflot on 19 April.

The ship is named after the 18th-century Russian explorer Aleksei Ilyich Chirikov who was the first Russian to reach Alaska.

== Technical details ==
Aleksey Chirikov is an upgraded version of SCF Sakhalin, a similar icebreaking platform supply vessel built at Helsinki in 2005. Several modifications have been made to the original design, including adding a fourth main engine, but the hull form is nearly identical. The most noticeable external difference is the covered foredeck, which will protect the mooring equipment from icing.

Aleksey Chirikov is 99.83 metres (327.5 ft) long overall and 94.02 metres (308.5 ft) at the waterline. The hull has a moulded breadth of 21.20 metres (69.6 ft) and depth of 11.00 metres (36.09 ft) to upper deck. When loaded to a draught of 7.90 metres (25.9 ft), the deadweight tonnage of the ship is 4,191 tons. The four Wärtsilä diesel generating sets — two twelve-cylinder 12V32 and two six-cylinder 6L32 engines — have a combined output of 18,000 kW (24,000 hp) and provide power for all shipboard consumers, including two 6.5 MW ABB Azipod VI1600 propulsion units. Being a double acting ship, Aleksey Chirikov is designed to be able to break ice both ahead and astern. She is capable of operating in ice up to 1.7 metres (5.6 ft) thick and maintain a speed of 3 knots (5.6 km/h; 3.5 mph) in level ice with a thickness of 1.5 metres (4.9 ft).
