= Röthelstein (icebreaker) =

History

Austria
- Name: Röthelstein
- Namesake: Röthelstein
- Owner: Österreichische Donaukraftwerke AG (1995–1999); Verbund AG (1999–present)
- Port of registry: Vienna, Austria
- Builder: Kværner Masa-Yards Helsinki New Shipyard (Finland)
- Cost: $4.3 million
- Yard number: 490
- Launched: Late 1994
- Completed: Spring 1995
- Identification: Call sign: OED2317; IMO number: 8640234; MMSI number: 203999369; ENI number: 30000229
- Status: In service

General characteristics
- Type: River icebreaker
- Displacement: 400 tonnes
- Length: 42.3 m (139 ft)
- Beam: 10 m (33 ft)
- Height: 6.0 m (20 ft)
- Draft: 2 m (7 ft) (design); 1.57 m (5 ft) (minimum)
- Installed power: 2 × Caterpillar 3508 DITA (2 × 700 kW)
- Propulsion: 2 × ABB Azipod VI0760A (2 × 560 kW)
- Speed: 11.6 knots (21.5 km/h; 13.3 mph)
- Crew: 3 (accommodation for 10)

Röthelstein is an Austrian river icebreaker owned by Verbund AG. She is used to break ice and push barges on the Danube river. Built by Kværner Masa-Yards in Finland in 1995, she was the first new vessel to be fitted with Azipod propulsion units.

== History ==
In early 1994, Kværner Masa-Yards signed a contract worth about $4.3 million for the construction of a shallow-draft river icebreaker for the Austrian power company Österreichische Donaukraftwerke AG (today Verbund AG). The vessel would be fitted with a new type of propulsion system and, following extensive development work carried out by the shipyard's Arctic Research Centre, feature high icebreaking capability despite its small size and shallow draft. Instead of being launched from a slipway or floated out from a dry dock, the 400-ton vessel was lowered to the water using the shipyard's cranes in late 1994. She was given the name Röthelstein after a municipality of the same name.

During sea trials in the northern Baltic Sea in February 1994, Röthelstein achieved a speed of 11.6 knots (21.5 km/h; 13.3 mph) in open water and, using the azimuthing propulsion units, demonstrated ability to turn on the spot. In full scale ice trials in the Gulf of Bothnia, the river icebreaker was successfully tested in level ice up to 70 centimetres (28 in) thick. Ridge penetration tests showed that Röthelstein could overcome ridges varying between 1.5 and 3.6 metres (4.9 and 11.8 ft) in thickness when the icebreaker proceeded in astern direction and utilized the pulling-type azimuth thrusters to break up the ridge. This was one of the first demonstrations of the double acting ship principle.

After the trials, Röthelstein sailed through the Rhine–Main–Danube Canal flying the Finnish flag. She was delivered to the owner in the port of Ybbs an der Donau in April 1995. Since then, Röthelstein has been in service on the Danube River.

== Design ==
Röthelstein is 42.3 metres (139 ft) long and has a beam of 10 metres (33 ft). Her normal operating draft is 2 metres (7 ft), which results in a displacement of about 400 tonnes, but in shallow waters the draft can be reduced to only 1.57 metres (5 ft). The hull form follows the design of very shallow draft river icebreakers with a wide cylindrical bow similar to those found in landing crafts. The low-profile deckhouse is only 6 metres (20 ft) high and provides accommodation for up to ten people, but normally the vessel carried a crew of three.

Röthelstein has a diesel-electric propulsion system consisting of two Caterpillar 3508 DITA generating sets, each producing 700 kW, and two 560 kW ABB Azipod VI0760A propulsion units with stainless steel propellers. Following retrofits to two existing vessels, the newly built Röthelstein was only the third vessel ever to be fitted with an electric podded propulsion system where the propulsion motors driving the propellers are located inside steerable gondolas. She was also the first vessel with Azipod units in pulling configuration where the propellers are facing forwards to improve efficiency and icebreaking performance.
