= MT Timofey Guzhenko =

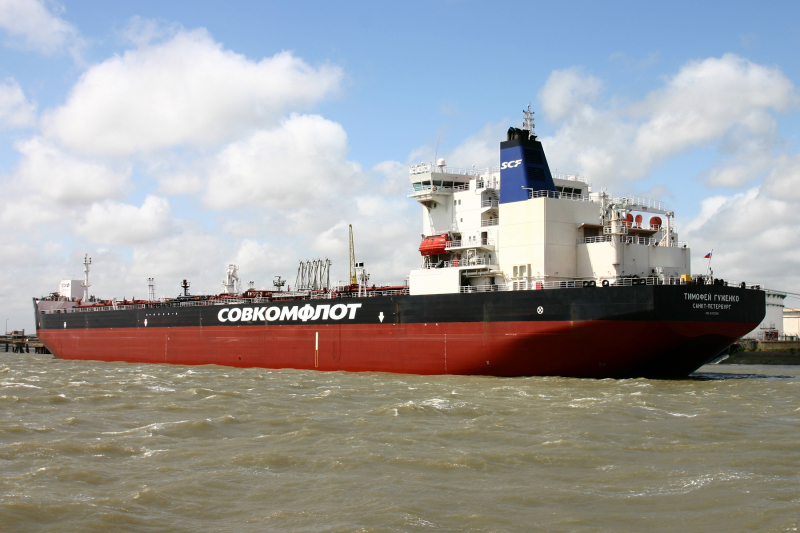

History

Russia
- Name: Timofey Guzhenko (Тимофей Гуженко)
- Namesake: Timofey Guzhenko
- Owner: Lorama Shipping Co. Ltd.
- Operator: Sovcomflot
- Port of registry: Saint Petersburg, Russia
- Builder: Samsung Heavy Industries, Geoje, South Korea
- Yard number: 1662
- Laid down: 30 June 2008
- Launched: 30 August 2008
- Completed: 24 February 2009
- In service: 2009–present
- Identification: Call sign UBQF5; IMO number: 9372561; MMSI number: 273330620
- Status: in active service

General characteristics
- Type: Shuttle tanker
- Tonnage: 49,597 GT; 21,075 NT; 72,722 DWT
- Displacement: 93,515 tons
- Length: 257 m (843 ft 2 in)
- Beam: 34 m (111 ft 7 in)
- Draught: 14.2 m (46 ft 7 in)
- Depth: 21 m (68 ft 11 in)
- Ice class: RMRS Arc6
- Installed power: 2 × Wärtsilä 16V38B (2 × 11,600 kW); Wärtsilä 6L38B (4,350 kW)
- Propulsion: Diesel-electric; Two ABB Azipod units (2 × 10 MW)
- Speed: 15.7 knots (29.1 km/h; 18.1 mph)

MT Timofey Guzhenko (Russian: Тимофей Гуженко) is a Russian double acting shuttle tanker operated by Sovcomflot. An icebreaking oil tanker capable of operating independently in 1.5-metre (5 ft) level ice, she carries oil from Varandey Oil Terminal, an ice-strengthened loading tower located 12 nautical miles (22 km) from the shore.

The ship is named after Timofey Guzhenko (1918–2008), the USSR Minister of Merchant Marine in 1970–1986 and one of the founders of the Sovcomflot Group. He was also the leader of the first expedition to reach the North Pole on board a surface ship, the nuclear-powered icebreaker Arktika, on 17 August 1977.

== Sister ships ==
- Vasily Dinkov (delivered 2007)
- Kapitan Gotskiy (delivered 2008)
