= Baltika (icebreaker) =

Russian icebreaker with asymmetric hull

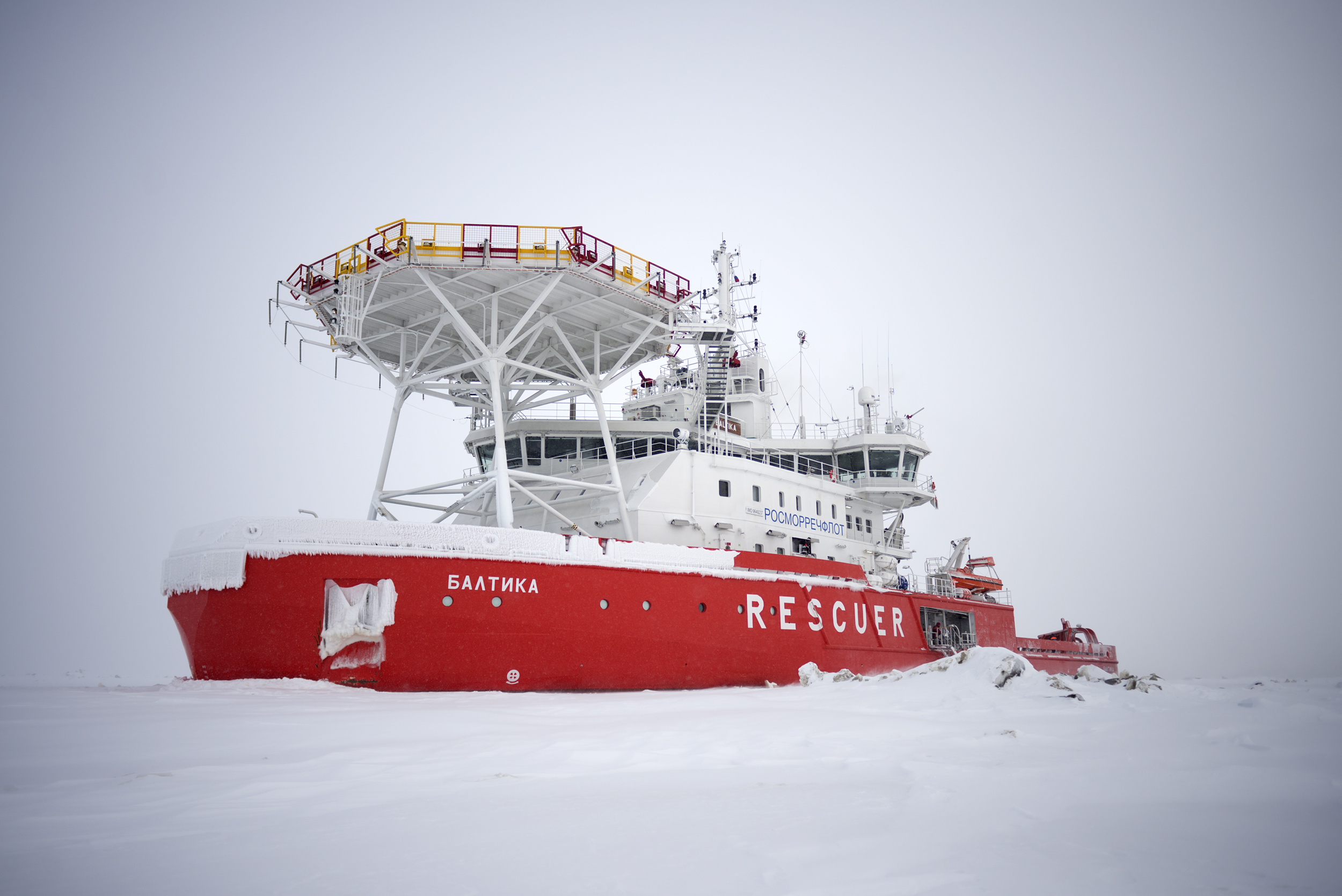
- Baltika on full-scale ice trials in the Gulf of Ob on 29 March 2015

History

Russia
- Name: Baltika (Балтика)
- Owner: Rosmorrechflot (Росморречфлот) (Note: Federal Agency for Maritime and River Transport of Russia (Russian: Федеральное агентство морского и речного транспорта))
- Operator: FGI Gosmorspassluzhba (Note: Russian Marine Emergency Rescue Service)
- Port of registry: Saint Petersburg, Russia
- Ordered: 8 December 2011
- Builder: Arctech Helsinki Shipyard (Helsinki, Finland); Shipyard Yantar JSC (Kaliningrad, Russia)
- Cost: 76 million euro
- Yard number: 508
- Laid down: 6 July 2012
- Launched: 12 December 2013
- Completed: 2014
- Identification: IMO number: 9649237; Call sign: UBUK2; MMSI number: 273320720
- Status: In service

General characteristics
- Type: Icebreaker
- Tonnage: 3,800 GT; 1,150 DWT
- Length: 76.4 m (251 ft)
- Beam: 20.5 m (67 ft) (maximum)
- Draught: 6.3 m (21 ft) (design)
- Ice class: RMRS Icebreaker6
- Installed power: 3 × Wärtsilä 9L26 (3 × 3,000 kW)
- Propulsion: Diesel-electric; three Steerprop azimuth thrusters (3 × 2.5 MW)
- Speed: 14 knots (26 km/h; 16 mph) (open water); 3 knots (5.6 km/h; 3.5 mph) in 1 m (3.3 ft) ice
- Range: 4,500 nautical miles (8,300 km; 5,200 mi)
- Endurance: 20 days
- Capacity: 380 square metres (4,100 sq ft) cargo deck
- Crew: 24; accommodation for 36
- Aviation facilities: Helideck

Baltika (Russian: Балтика) is a Russian icebreaker built by Arctech Helsinki Shipyard in Helsinki, Finland. She is the first ship ever built with an asymmetric hull that allows her to operate not only ahead and astern, but also obliquely (sideways) with a large angle of attack. In this way, the relatively small oblique icebreaker is capable of opening a wide channel in ice for large merchant ships.

The vessel was initially scheduled for delivery to FGI Gosmorspassluzhba, the Russian Marine Emergency Rescue Service, in early 2014. However, she remained moored at Kaliningrad until late 2014, when the vessel was towed to St. Petersburg, and was finally accepted to service in December 2014.

== Development and construction ==
The development of the oblique icebreaker concept dates back to 1997, when the engineers at Kværner Masa-Yards Arctic Technology Centre (MARC) came up with a new way of assisting large tankers in ice-infested waters. Traditionally, escorting large ships up to 40 metres (130 ft) wide required two conventional icebreakers with a beam of 23–25 metres (75–82 ft), a practice that was not very efficient and economical. The solution was a triangle-shaped vessel with three azimuth thrusters in the "corners" pushing the asymmetric hull with a 50-degree angle of attack—almost sideways—in ice to open a 50-metre (160 ft) channel behind the vessel. Model tests in an ice tank showed that the proposed concept was feasible and the concept was patented. The development of the oblique icebreaker as continued by MARC and its successor, Aker Arctic, together with ABB and the Finnish Funding Agency for Technology and Innovation (Tekes). The result was a vessel concept referred to as Aker ARC 100, an oblique icebreaker that could also be used for oil spill response operations.

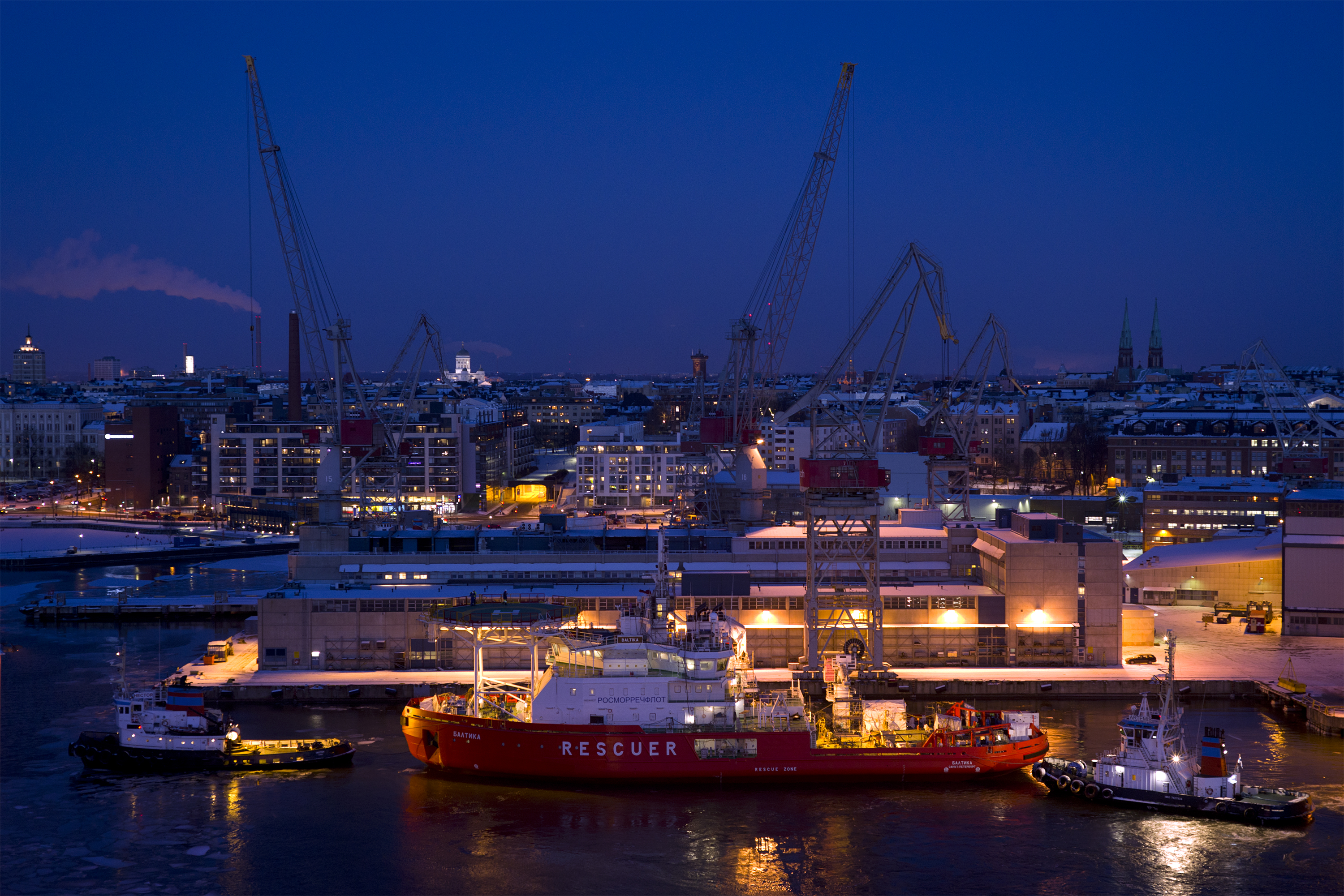
Float-out of Baltika on 18 January 2014.

On 8 December 2011, Arctech Helsinki Shipyard signed a 76 million euro contract with the Russian Ministry of Transport for the construction of an icebreaking multipurpose emergency and rescue vessel for the Federal Agency for Maritime and River Transport of Russia. The vessel is designed to be capable of opening a 50-metre (160 ft) channel in 60-centimetre (2.0 ft) ice when going sideways. Initially, the hull of the first oblique icebreaker ever built was to be produced by Shipyard Yantar JSC, a shipyard owned by the United Shipbuilding Corporation that also owns half of the Finnish shipyard, in Kaliningrad. The steel production began on 24 April 2012 and the keel was laid on 6 July 2012. However, instead of launching the unfinished hull in Kaliningrad and towing it to Helsinki for outfitting, the blocks were transported to Helsinki and the hull was assembled in Finland. For this reason, the delivery of the vessel was delayed from December 2013 into the spring of 2014.

The first blocks arrived on a barge on 9 April 2013 and the hull assembly started in June. The vessel was launched on 12 December 2013 and christened Baltika. She was floated out for outfitting on 18 January 2014 and began her first sea trials on 6 March 2014. The second sea trials began on 26 March. On 15 May 2014, Baltika left Helsinki under tow for Kaliningrad where she would be handed over to the owner. However, she was later towed to St. Petersburg and delivered to Rosmorrechflot on 30 December 2014. The ceremonial hoisting of the flag was held on 20 February 2015.

== Career ==
Baltika is operated by FGI Gosmorspassluzhba, the Russian Marine Emergency Rescue Service.

About two weeks after entering service, Baltika departed from St. Petersburg on 6 March 2015 for Murmansk, from where she headed for full-scale ice trials in the Gulf of Ob. The vessel passed all tests successfully and later returned to Murmansk.

In October 2015, Baltika returned to the Gulf of Ob to assist with the construction of the offshore oil terminal for the Novoportovskoye oil field.

== Design ==
=== General characteristics ===
Baltika is 76.4 metres (251 ft) long overall and 72.1 metres (237 ft) at the waterline, and has a maximum beam of 20.5 metres (67 ft). Her draught at design waterline is 6.3 metres (21 ft) and the corresponding deadweight tonnage 1,150 tons. She is served by a crew of 24 and has accommodation for 12 additional personnel.

A true multipurpose vessel, Baltika is designed for icebreaking operations in harbours and adjacent waters. In addition, she can be utilized for towing of vessels and floating facilities in an emergency, extinguish external fires and perform various salvage and rescue operations. In case of oil spill, the vertical side of the asymmetric hull can be used as a large sweeping arm that guides oil floating on the surface to a built-in skimmer as the vessel moves obliquely through the oil slick.

The ship is classified by the Russian Maritime Register of Shipping. Her ice class, Icebreaker6, requires the vessel to be capable of operating in level ice with a thickness of 1 metre (3.3 ft) in a continuous motion and strengthened for navigation in non-Arctic waters where ice can be up to 1.5 metres (5 ft) thick.

=== Power and propulsion ===
Baltika has a diesel-electric propulsion system built around the power plant principle in which the main generators provide electricity for all shipboard consumers, including the propulsion system. The vessel has three Wärtsilä 9L26 main generators, each producing 3,000 kW (4,000 hp) and capable of running on low sulphur fuel oil. The vessel is propelled by three 2.5 MW azimuth thrusters manufactured by Steerprop, two in the stern and one in the bow.

The vessel is capable of moving in 1-metre (3.3 ft) level ice at 3 knots (5.6 km/h; 3.5 mph) in both ahead and astern directions. When operating in oblique mode, she can open a 50-metre (160 ft) channel in 60-centimetre (2.0 ft) ice. In open water, the service speed of the vessel is 14 knots (26 km/h; 16 mph) and operational range 4,500 nautical miles (8,300 km; 5,200 mi).
