= Oblique icebreaker =

Asymmetric icebreaker that can break ice sideways to open a wide channel

A rendering of the icebreaking multipurpose emergency and rescue vessel ordered by the Russian Ministry of Transport, showing the unconventional operating mode of an oblique icebreaker.

An oblique icebreaker is a special type of icebreaker designed to operate not only ahead and astern, but also obliquely (sideways) with a large angle of attack. In this way, a relatively small icebreaker is capable of opening a wide channel in ice for large merchant ships.

The oblique icebreaker concept was developed in the late 1990s by Kværner Masa-Yards Arctic Technology Centre (MARC), the Finnish engineering company also responsible for the development of the double acting ships. The first vessel of this kind was ordered by the Russian Ministry of Transport on 8 December 2011 and was completed in 2014.

== Development ==
The development of the oblique icebreaker concept began in 1997, when Kværner Masa-Yards Arctic Technology Centre (MARC) established a project to develop new ways of assisting large tankers in ice conditions. Traditionally, escorting large ships up to 40 metres (130 ft) wide required two conventional icebreakers with a beam of 23–25 metres (75–82 ft), a practice that was not very efficient and economical. Analysis of Finnish harbour statistics and icebreaker logbooks showed that with a beam of 20 metres (66 ft), the icebreaker would be wide enough to provide assistance to most merchant ships in need of towing. The larger ships, fewer in number, could then be assisted with an unconventional method. The result was an asymmetrical, triangle-shaped vessel with three azimuth thrusters in the "corners" pushing the icebreaker with a 50-degree angle of attack—almost sideways—in ice. Model tests in an ice tank showed that the proposed concept was viable and that the resistance of a large cargo ship was considerably reduced in both level ice as well as frozen brash ice when operating behind the oblique icebreaker. The concept has been patented.

Over the years, the concept was further developed by MARC and its successor, Aker Arctic, together with ABB and the Finnish Funding Agency for Technology and Innovation (Tekes). In addition to icebreaking, the oblique vessel could also be utilized for oil spill response operations in both open and ice-infested waters by using the flat side to guide the oil to a recovery unit. However, there have also been doubts about the ability of the relatively small vessel to break a wide channel in ice without the much greater displacement and shaft power of a traditional icebreaker.

== Construction ==
On 8 December 2011, the Russian Ministry of Transport ordered an icebreaking multipurpose emergency and rescue vessel from Arctech Helsinki Shipyard (AHS), then a joint venture between the Finnish STX Finland Cruise Oy and the Russian United Shipbuilding Corporation. The 76 million euro vessel, based on Aker Arctic's Aker ARC 100 oblique icebreaker concept developed for AHS, was designed to be capable of breaking level ice up to 1 metre (3.3 ft) thick both ahead and astern, and generate a 50-metre (55 yd) channel in 0.6-metre (2.0 ft) ice when moving sideways using three Z-drive thrusters with a combined output of 7,500 kW. Initially, the hull of the 76.4-metre (251 ft) vessel referred to as "NB508" was to be built by Shipyard Yantar JSC in Yantar, Kaliningrad, where production began on 24 April 2012 and keel was laid on 6 July. However, instead of launching the unfinished hull in Kaliningrad and towing it to Helsinki for outfitting, the blocks were transported to Helsinki and the hull was assembled in Finland. The first blocks arrived on a barge on 9 April 2013 and the vessel, which was given the name Baltika, was completed in 2014. In 2015, the oblique icebreaker carried out ice trials in the Gulf of Ob where the sideways icebreaking was successfully demonstrated for the first time.

== See also ==
- Double acting ship – Type of icebreaking ship designed to break heavy ice while going astern
