= MT Yuriy Kuchiev =

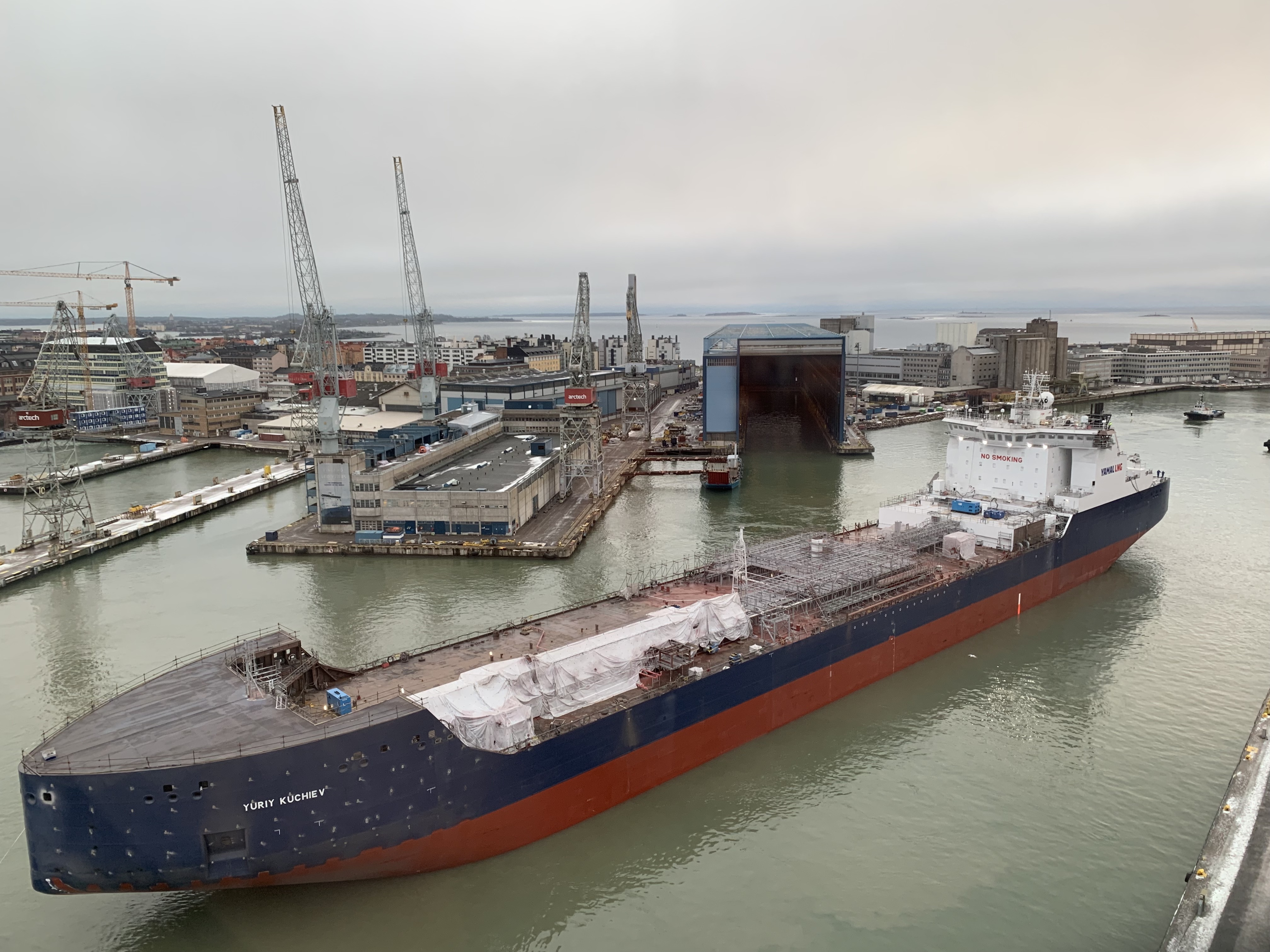
- Yuriy Kuchiev in Hietalahti shipyard on 30 December 2018

History
- Name: Yuriy Kuchiev
- Namesake: Yuri Kuchiev
- Operator: Dynacom
- Port of registry: Limassol, Cyprus
- Builder: Arctech Helsinki Shipyard, Finland; Brodotrogir Shipyard, Croatia (forward part)
- Yard number: 515
- Laid down: 27 July 2017
- Launched: 16 July 2018 (forward part); 17 December 2018 (complete ship)
- Completed: Late 2018 (initial schedule); 28 August 2019 (actual delivery)
- Identification: IMO number: 9804033
- Status: In service

General characteristics
- Type: Gas condensate tanker
- Tonnage: 39,275 GT; 50,000 DWT
- Length: 230 m (755 ft)
- Beam: 32.5 m (107 ft)
- Draught: 11.7 m (38 ft) (design); 12 m (39 ft) (maximum)
- Depth: 18 m (59 ft)
- Ice class: RMRS Arc7
- Installed power: 2 × Wärtsilä 12V32 (2 × 6,720 kW); 2 × Wärtsilä 16V32 (2 × 8,960 kW)
- Propulsion: Diesel-electric; two ABB Azipod units (2 × 11 MW)
- Speed: 16 knots (30 km/h; 18 mph) (maximum); 13 knots (24 km/h; 15 mph) (service); 2 knots (3.7 km/h; 2.3 mph) (icebreaking)
- Crew: 26; accommodation for 30

Yuriy Kuchiev is an icebreaking gas condensate tanker operated by the Greek shipowner Dynacom. The vessel, built at Arctech Helsinki Shipyard in Finland, utilizes the double acting ship principle to allow independent operation without icebreaker escort in ice-covered seas. The vessel was delivered to the owner in August 2019.

== History ==
=== Development and construction ===
In early 2016, it was reported that the Greek shipowner Dynacom had ordered two 58,000 DWT arctic condensate tankers to transport gas condensate from the natural gas fields in the Yamal Peninsula. One of the vessels would be built at Guangzhou Shipyard in China while the other was ordered at an undisclosed price from the Russian-owned Arctech Helsinki Shipyard. While the Finnish shipyard was initially reluctant to confirm the contract, the tanker was included in a presentation by Arctech CEO Esko Mustamäki at the Conference on the Economic Development of the Arctic in June 2016. Although over 500 vessels have been delivered from the Hietalahti shipyard in the past 150 years, the newbuilding number 515 would be the first tanker built at the shipyard.

While the final hull assembly would be carried out in Helsinki, a 167-metre (548 ft) forward section was subcontracted to Brodotrogir Shipyard in Croatia, where steel production began in February 2017. However, the official keel laying ceremony, which marks the start of hull assembly, was held in Helsinki on 27 July 2017. The bow section of the vessel was launched on 16 July 2018 and arrived in Helsinki on board a semi-submersible heavy-lift ship in August. The vessel was launched on 17 December 2018, floated out on 28 December, and returned to the covered dry dock bow-first on 30 December. Over the spring, the vessel was still being outfitted at the shipyard, reportedly due to production delays and quality issues with the Croatian-built forward section. On 29 April, Yuriy Kuchiev was moved from the covered dry dock to the shipyard's outfitting pier in preparation of inclining test before leaving for the first sea trials on 6 May. The vessel was finally delivered to Dynacom in an official naming ceremony on 28 August 2019.

The vessel is named after Yuri Kuchiev (1919–2005), the captain of the Soviet nuclear-powered icebreaker Arktika when the vessel became the first surface ship to reach the North Pole in 1977.

The arctic condensate tanker Yuriy Kuchiev is the last vessel delivered by Arctech Helsinki Shipyard in Finland; the shipyard's ownership was transferred to a new company, Helsinki Shipyard, in May 2019.

== Design ==
=== General characteristics ===
Yuriy Kuchiev is 230 metres (755 ft) long and has a beam of 32.5 metres (107 ft), making the vessel the widest newbuilding ever delivered from Hietalahti shipyard. The length-to-beam ratio is slightly greater than that of other icebreaking tankers operating in the region, improving ice-going capability as well as allowing the hull to be assembled in Arctech's Panamax-sized (Note: The old Panamax general limitation for beam was 32.31 metres (106.0 ft) prior to expansion.) dry dock. The maximum draft of the vessel, limited by the port of Sabetta in the Gulf of Ob, is 12 metres (39 ft). The vessel's design deadweight tonnage is 50,000 tons.

The hull of the vessel is strengthened to ice class Arc7 according to the requirements of the Russian Maritime Register of Shipping. This allows the vessel to operate in up to 1.8 metres (5.9 ft) thick first-year ice during the winter and spring navigation seasons, and in second-year ice during summer and autumn. In addition, operation is allowed along the full length of the Northern Sea Route, but in heavy ice conditions icebreaker escort is required. Since the vessel is designed according to the double acting ship principle, the stern of the vessel is strengthened in the same way as the bow. In order to offset the increased scantlings, the hull is made mainly out of high-strength shipbuilding steel. The vessel is also thoroughly winterized for operation in ambient temperatures down to −50 °C (−58 °F) and features a covered forward mooring deck to protect the deck equipment from icing.

=== Power and propulsion ===
While a typical 50,000 DWT Handymax tanker would have a single conventional shaft line and propulsion power in the range of 9 to 10 megawatts (12,000 to 13,000 hp), Yuriy Kuchiev is designed to operate independently in difficult ice conditions and thus requires a specialized propulsion system as well as significantly more installed power. The diesel-electric power plant consists of two 6,720-kilowatt (9,010 hp) 12-cylinder Wärtsilä 12V32 and two 8,960-kilowatt (12,020 hp) 16-cylinder Wärtsilä 16V32 four-stroke medium-speed diesel engines driving alternators. In addition, there is a 740-kilowatt (990 hp) harbor diesel generator. For propulsion, Yuriy Kuchiev has two 11-megawatt (15,000 hp) ABB Azipod VI2300 azimuthing propulsion units with 5.6-metre (18 ft) stainless steel propellers. The propulsion units are of pulling type, meaning that the propeller is always facing the direction of motion: when breaking ice in astern direction (backwards), the propellers are turned around to face the stern of the vessel and help with the icebreaking process.

Yuriy Kuchiev is designed to break 1.9-metre (6 ft) level ice in a continuous motion with a speed of 2 knots (3.7 km/h; 2.3 mph) in astern direction. When sailing bow-first, the icebreaking capability is about 1.5 metres (5 ft). In open water, the vessel's economical service speed is 13 knots (24 km/h; 15 mph).
