= Sergey Frank =

Russian politician (born 1960)

- Сергей Франк
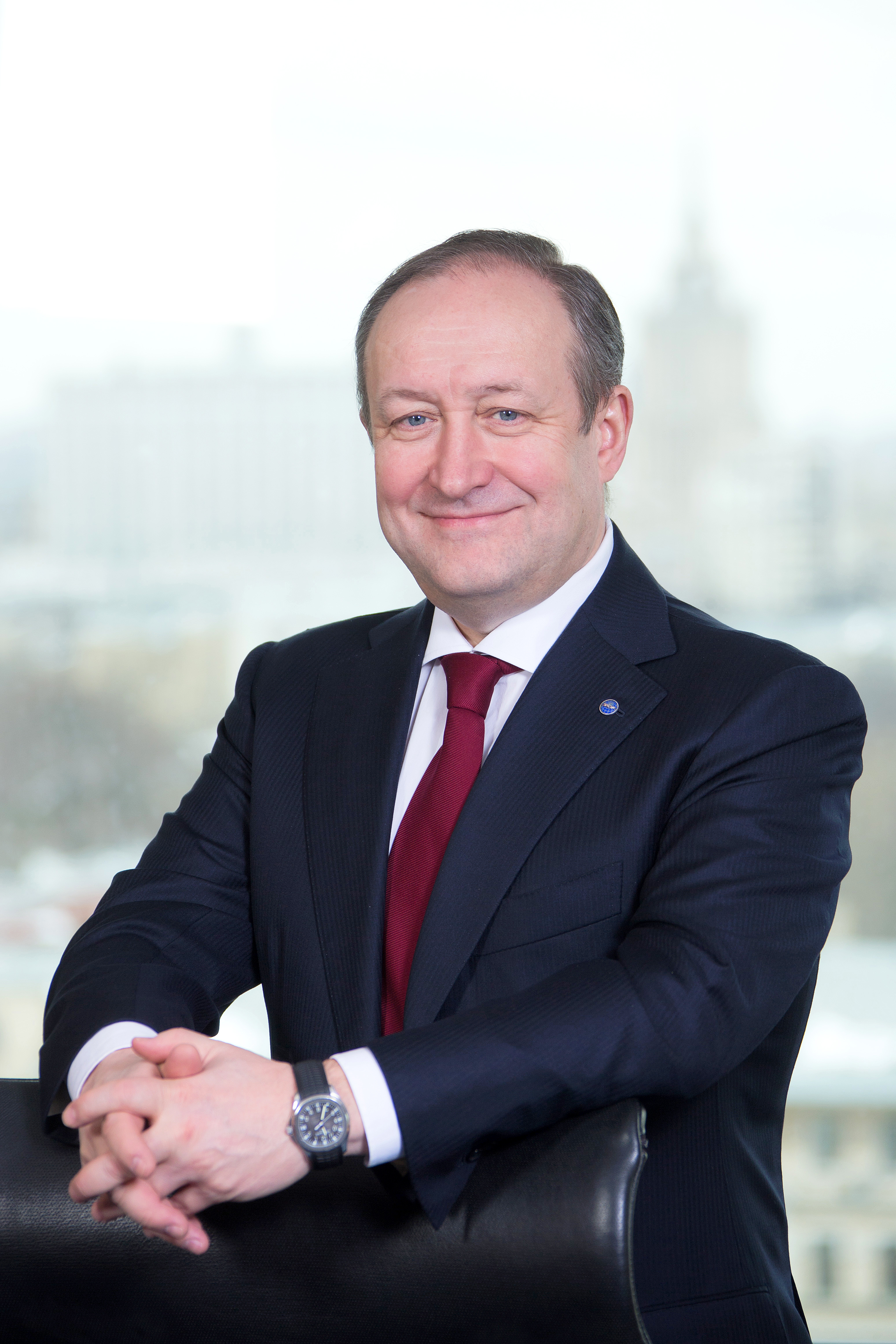
- Frank in 2014

Minister of Transport
- In office 2 March 1998 – 24 February 2004
- Preceded by: Nikolay Tsakh
- Succeeded by: Igor Levitin

Personal details
- Born: Sergey Ottovich Frank; 13 August 1960 (age 66) Novosibirsk, Soviet Union
- Party: Independent

Sergey Ottovich Frank (Russian: Сергей Оттович Франк, born 13 August 1960), is a Russian politician who had served as the Minister of Transport from 1998 to 2004.

He was the chairman of the Board of Directors of the state shipping company Sovcomflot.

== Biography ==
Sergey Frank was born in Novosibirsk on 13 August 1960, he is of German descent.

Between 1981 and 1984, he was the secretary of the Komsomol committee.

In 1983, he graduated from the Far East Higher Marine Engineering School named after V.I. Admiral G.I. Nevelskoy with a degree in navigation engineer.

Since 1984, he is the deputy head of the school for political work.

In 1989, he graduated from the Higher Commercial School at the All-Union Academy of Foreign Trade. That same year, he was the Head of the Foreign Economic Relations Service, then promoted to the Deputy General Director for Economics of the Far Eastern Shipping Company.

In 1995, he graduated in absentia from the Faculty of Law of the Far Eastern State University and was appointed deputy director of the Maritime Transport Department of the Ministry of Transport of Russia.

From 1996 to 1997, Frank was the Deputy Minister of Transport. In 1998, he was promoted to the First Deputy Minister of Transport.

On 2 March 1998, by Decree of the President of Russia No. 213, Frank was appointed Minister of Transport. He served in this position in six compositions of the Cabinet of Ministers.

On 24 February 2004, by Decree of the President of the Russian Federation No. 264, he was dismissed along with the Mikhail Kasyanov cabinet.

On 27 April 2004, he was appointed assistant to Prime Minister Mikhail Fradkov,

Between October 2004 to September 2019, he was General Director of the state shipping company Sovcomflot.

In 2007 he defended his thesis and became a candidate of technical sciences.

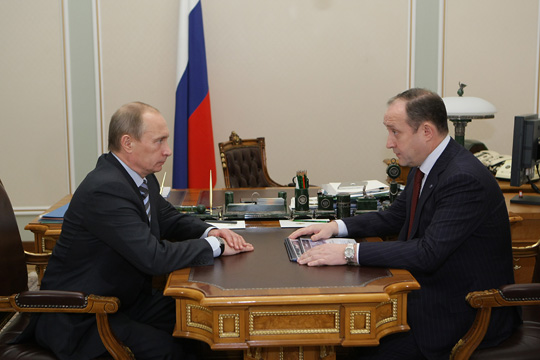
Frank with Prime Minister Vladimir Putin in December 2009

In 2014, Frank headed the Board of Directors of the United Shipbuilding Corporation.

Since September 2019, he is the chairman of the Board of Directors of PAO Sovcomflot.

=== Activities at Sovcomflot ===
Following his appointment to the position of General Director, Sovcomflot set a course for business development related to the needs of Russian energy companies. The company specializes in the sea transportation of energy resources in the difficult climatic conditions of the Arctic and Far Eastern seas. The new investment program allowed Sovcomflot to expand the volume of fleet construction, including at Russian shipyards. The number of vessels with a reinforced ice class has increased significantly.

== Sanctions ==
In December 2022 the USA sanctioned Sergey Frank, followed in May 2023 by the United Kingdom.

== Family ==
He is married, and has two children. His son, Gleb, is married to Ksenia, the youngest daughter of Gennady Timchenko.

=== Other activities ===
Sergey Frank is a member of the Board of the Russian Union of Industrialists and Entrepreneurs (RSPP), is Deputy of the Commission on Transport and Transport Infrastructure. Member of the Board of Trustees of the Institute of Legislation and Comparative Law under the Government of Russia, heads the Board of Trustees of Moscow State University. Admiral G. I. Nevelsky, is a member of the Board of Trustees of the Graduate School of Management of St. Petersburg State University. He was a member of the Supreme Supervisory Board of the All-Russian Swimming Federation. He was a member of the Board of Trustees of the Russian Geographical Society.
