= SCF Sakhalin =

Russian icebreaker platform supply and standby vessel

History

Russia
- Name: 2005–2010: FESCO Sakhalin (ФЕСКО Сахалин); 2010–: SCF Sakhalin (СКФ Сахалин)
- Owner: 2005–2010: Talgona Shipping Co. Ltd.; 2010–: SCF Sakhalin Vessels Limited (Sovcomflot)
- Operator: 2005–2010: Far East Shipping Company; 2010–: Sovcomflot
- Port of registry: Vladivostok, Russia
- Ordered: 2003
- Builder: Aker Finnyards, Helsinki, Finland
- Yard number: 504
- Laid down: 22 June 2004
- Launched: 18 February 2005
- Christened: 31 May 2005
- Completed: 15 June 2005
- In service: 2005–
- Identification: IMO number: 9307724; Call sign: UHME; MMSI number: 237718120
- Status: In service

General characteristics
- Type: Platform supply vessel
- Tonnage: 6,882 GT; 2,065 NT; 4,298 DWT
- Displacement: 9,980 tons
- Length: 99.90 m (327.8 ft) (overall); 93.936 m (308.2 ft) (waterline)
- Beam: 20.95 m (68.7 ft) (moulded); 21.23 m (69.7 ft) (max)
- Draught: 7.50 m (24.6 ft)
- Depth: 11.00 m (36.1 ft)
- Ice class: DNV ICE-10 Icebreaker; RS Icebreaker6
- Installed power: 3 × Wärtsilä 8L38B (3 × 5,800 kW)
- Propulsion: Diesel-electric; 2 × ABB Azipod VI1600 (2 × 6,500 kW); KaMeWa Ulstein TT2200 bow thrusters (2 × 1,100 kW)
- Speed: 16.7 knots (30.9 km/h; 19.2 mph) (max); 15 knots (28 km/h; 17 mph) (service); 2 knots (3.7 km/h; 2.3 mph) in 1.5 m (4.9 ft) level ice
- Crew: 40 (max)

SCF Sakhalin (Russian: СКФ Сахалин) is a Russian icebreaking platform supply and standby vessel owned by SCF Sakhalin Vessels Limited, a subsidiary of Sovcomflot. The ship was built by Aker Finnyards Helsinki shipyard in Finland in 2005 as FESCO Sakhalin (Russian: ФЕСКО Сахалин) for Far East Shipping Company (FESCO), but was purchased by Sovcomflot and renamed in 2010. Since the beginning it has been in long-term charter for Exxon Neftegas Ltd. and used to supply oil platforms in the Sakhalin-I project.

== Design ==
=== General characteristics ===
The maximum overall length of SCF Sakhalin is 99.90 metres (327.8 ft) and its length between perpendiculars is 86.05 metres (282.3 ft). The hull, 93.936 metres (308.2 ft) long at the waterline, has moulded breadth of 20.95 metres (68.7 ft) and maximum breadth of 21.23 metres (69.7 ft). The draught and depth to upper deck are 7.50 metres (24.6 ft) and 11.00 metres (36.1 ft), respectively. The displacement of the icebreaking supply ship is 9,980 tons and its deadweight tonnage is 4,298 tons, gross tonnage 6,882 and net tonnage 2,065.

To supply offshore drilling platforms the ship can carry 1,000 tons of cargo on the 700 m^{2} (7,535 sq ft) stern deck and 1,500 tons of liquid cargo in its cargo tanks. In addition it has six 50 m^{3} silos for bulk powder cargoes such as barite and cement. While operated by a maximum crew of 40, in case of emergency the ship can provide emergency accommodation for 150 evacuees. It also has two fire monitors, each with an output of 1,200 m^{3}/h, and oil spill response equipment such as an Arctic skimmer and 200 metres of oil boom.

The ship is classified by both Det Norske Veritas and Russian Maritime Register of Shipping with class notations 1A1 ICE-10 Icebreaker Supply Vessel Standby Vessel Fire Fighter I OILREC SF DEICE E0 DYNPOS-AUT NAUT-OC DK(+) HL(2.0) and KM* Icebreaker6[1] AUT1 OMBO FF3WS DYNPOS-1 ANTI-ICE special purpose ship/supply vessel/oli recovery ship (>60C), respectively.

SCF Sakhalin, designed by Aker Arctic, is a double acting ship, meaning that its bow is designed for more efficient operation in open water and stern for the most severe ice conditions. The vessel, winterized for operating temperatures as low as −40 °C (−40 °F), is capable of breaking level ice up to 1.5 metres (4.9 ft) thick at 2 knots and penetrate 20-metre (65.6 ft) ridges with a 4-metre (13.1 ft) consolidated layer. In open water the ship has a service speed of 15 knots.

=== Power and propulsion ===
The ship has a diesel-electric powertrain with three eight-cylinder Wärtsilä 8L38B 4-stroke medium-speed diesel engines, each with a maximum continuous rating of 5,800 kW (7,778 hp) at 600 rpm, driving 6,847 kVA generators that produce electricity for all shipboard consumers. In addition the vessel has one six-cylinder Wärtsilä 6L20 auxiliary generating set, producing 1,080 kW (1,448 hp) at 1000 rpm, that can be used when the ship is at port, and a Caterpillar 3412 emergency diesel generator.

The vessel is propelled by two 6.5 MW ABB Azipod VI1600 electric azimuth thrusters. The ice-strengthened pods, designed to meet the requirements of DNV ice class ICE-10, can be used to "eat up" ice rubble while the propeller wash reduces the friction between the hull and the ice. They also give the vessel excellent maneuverability at low speeds and in ice, and dynamic positioning capabilities. In addition the ship has two KaMeWa Ulstein TT2200 bow thrusters with high ice class, 1,100 kW each.

== Career ==
In 2003 by the Russian company Far East Shipping Company PLC (FESCO) placed an order for the world's first large double-acting icebreaker. The ship, designed by Aker Arctic, is a result of a long series of research and development projects dating back to 1989. The keel of the ship was laid on 22 June 2004 in Aker Finnyards Helsinki shipyard and it was launched on 18 February 2005. FESCO Sakhalin, christened on 31 May, was completed on 15 June and delivered to the owner in the following day.

Designed specifically for year-round support and standby ice management of the Orlan platform, FESCO Sakhalin was chartered for Exxon Neftegas Ltd. for the operations in the Sakhalin-I project in the Sea of Okhotsk where there is a risk of becoming surrounded by grounded ice rubble.

The ship was acquired by SCF Sakhalin Vessels Limited, a subsidiary of the Russian shipping company Sovcomflot, in 2010 and renamed SCF Sakhalin, but continues in the original charter under the management of FESCO. In 2010 the company ordered two sister ships of slightly upgraded design, priced around $100 million each, from the same shipyard, then partially owned by the Russian United Shipbuilding Corporation and known as Arctech Helsinki Shipyard. The new vessels were delivered in 2012–2013 and chartered for Exxon Neftegas Ltd. to be used in the Arkutun-Dagi offshore oil field.
