= Röthelstein =

- Former municipality
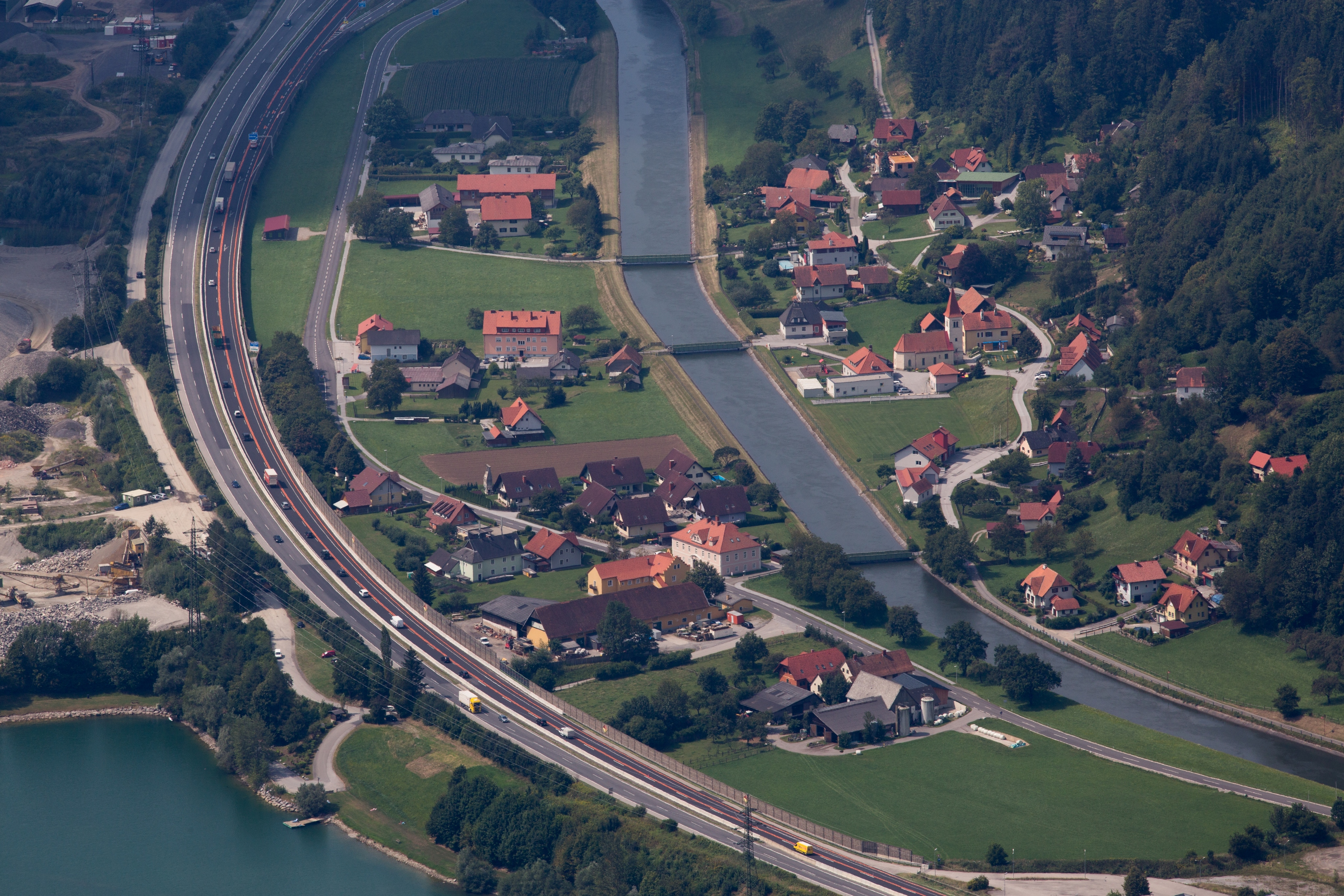

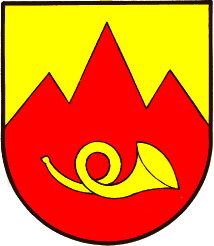
- Coat of arms

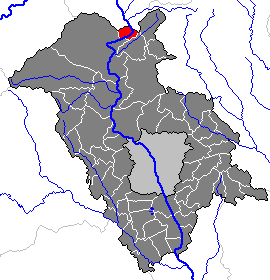
- Location within Graz-Umgebung district

- Location within Austria
- Coordinates: 47°18′31″N 15°22′04″E
- Country: Austria
- State: Styria
- District: Graz-Umgebung

Area
  - Total: 7.01 km^{2} (2.71 sq mi)
- Elevation: 449 m (1,473 ft)

Population (1 January 2016)
  - Total: 210
  - Density: 30/km^{2} (78/sq mi)
- Time zone: UTC+1 (CET)
  - Summer (DST): UTC+2 (CEST)
- Postal code: 8131
- Area code: 03867
- Vehicle registration: GU
- Website: www.roethelstein.at

Röthelstein is a former municipality in the district of Graz-Umgebung in the Austrian state of Styria. Since the 2015 Styria municipal structural reform, it is part of the municipality Frohnleiten.

== Population ==
Historical population
Year	Pop.	±%
1869	261	—
1880	236	−9.6%
1890	213	−9.7%
1900	221	+3.8%
1910	176	−20.4%
1923	214	+21.6%
1934	237	+10.7%
1939	208	−12.2%
1951	247	+18.8%
1961	235	−4.9%
1971	244	+3.8%
1981	219	−10.2%
1991	213	−2.7%
2001	223	+4.7%
