= Double acting ship =

Type of icebreaking ship designed to break heavy ice while going astern

A double acting ship is a type of icebreaking ship designed to travel forwards in open water and thin ice, but turn around and proceed astern (backwards) in heavy ice conditions. In this way, the ship can operate independently in severe ice conditions without icebreaker assistance but retain better open water performance than traditional icebreaking vessels.

Double acting ships carrying liquid cargo are generally referred as double acting tankers. In the early 1990s Kværner Masa-Yards Arctic Technology Centre (MARC) developed the concept for oil transportation between the Russian Arctic and Europe and the first double acting tanker, Finnish crude oil tanker Tempera, was delivered in 2002.

== History ==
In the early 1990s, studies conducted by Kvaerner Masa-Yards showed that the ship's open water efficiency is as important a factor as its ability to operate in difficult ice conditions in oil transportation from the Russian Arctic to Europe. This was due to the fact that on a direct route 90% of the time would be spent in open water. Direct independent transportation with a vessel capable of navigating in both ice and open water was also found out to be a more economical alternative in comparison with transshipment, i.e. the use of different vessels for different parts of the journey, or normal ships relying on icebreaker assistance.

Although icebreaking cargo ships had been built in the past, their hull forms were always compromises between open water performance and icebreaking capability. A good icebreaking bow, designed to break the ice by bending it under the ship's weight, has very poor open water characteristics and is subjected to slamming in heavy weather. However, a hydrodynamically efficient bulbous bow greatly increases the ice resistance, making it unsuitable for icebreakers. As a result, the total efficiency of icebreaking ships is 20–40% less than that of good open water vessels of similar size mainly due to the bow form.

In the late 1800s, captains operating ships in icebound waters discovered that sometimes it was easier to break through ice by running their vessels astern. Although not known at the time, this was because the forward-facing propellers generated a lubricating water flow that lowered the ice resistance by reducing friction between the ship's hull and ice. However, as the steering ability of a ship is greatly reduced when running astern, it could not be considered a main operating mode. These findings resulted in the adoption of bow propellers in older icebreakers operating in the Great Lakes and the Baltic Sea, but in the more severe Arctic ice conditions they could not be used because the risk of the bow propellers being damaged by multi-year ice floes was too great. Furthermore, forward-facing propellers have a very low propulsion efficiency and they considerably increase the ship's open water resistance, making them unsuitable for merchant ships.

== Development ==
Because of the limitations of traditional propulsion systems, the double acting ship concept wasn't seriously considered until the development of electric podded propulsion units which combine the advantages of the diesel–electric powertrain, already widely used in icebreakers, with the excellent manoeuvrability of azimuth thrusters. Initially developed as a co-operation between the multinational electrical equipment corporation ABB Group and the Finnish shipbuilder Masa-Yards in the late 1980s, the new propulsion unit became known as Azipod (a portmanteau of "azimuth thruster" and "podded propulsion unit") which is today a trademark of ABB Group.

The superiority of electric podded propulsion in icebreaking ships, especially when running astern, was proved when the first propulsion pod was installed on fairway maintenance vessel Seili, owned by the Finnish Maritime Administration, in 1990. Before the conversion the ship could not break ice astern at all, but after the propeller and rudder were replaced with a 1.5 MW Azipod unit she could run astern in level ice as thick as 0.6 metres (2 ft). The vessel could also easily be steered when running astern in ice. When product tankers Uikku and Lunni were converted to Azipod propulsion in 1993 and 1994, respectively, the result was similar increase in manoeuvrability and icebreaking capability. Even though the ships were originally designed with icebreaking capability in mind, after the conversion ice resistance in level ice when running astern was 40% of that when breaking ice ahead despite the ships being equipped with an icebreaking bow and not designed to break ice astern.

Model tests conducted by MARC in 1994 showed that a double acting ship equipped with an Azipod propulsion unit could break through ice ridges in continuous motion instead of ramming like conventional icebreakers. It also required less power for running in level ice than traditional designs, resulting in 40–50% reduction in ice resistance due to lubricating effect of propeller-induced water flow, more open stern design and the propellers being allowed to mill (crush) the ice. The icebreaking capability of an Azipod-equipped icebreaker operating astern in level ice was also found out to be superior to traditional icebreakers regardless of propulsion arrangement.

== Double acting ships ==
=== Icebreakers and other special vessels ===
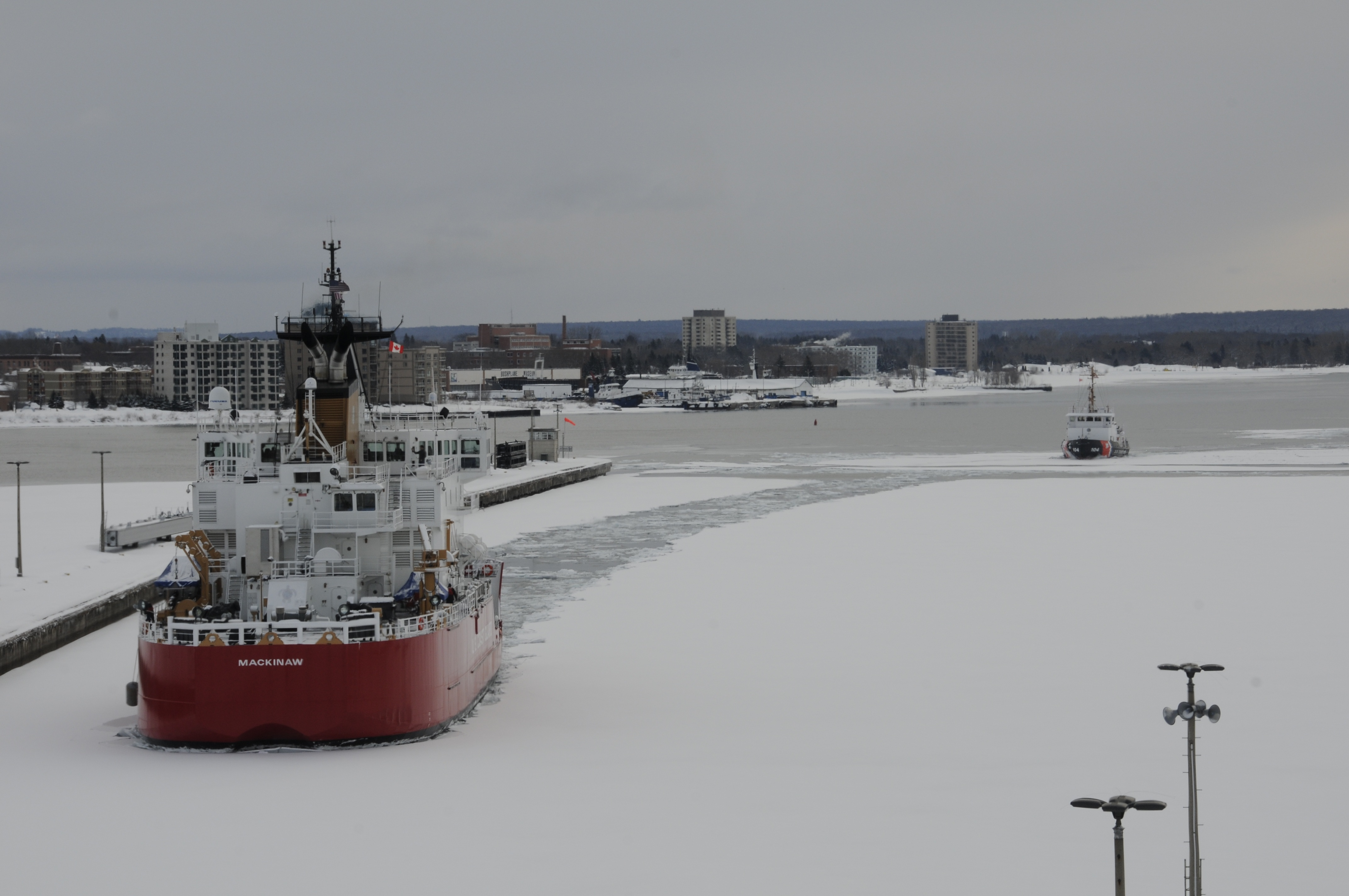
USCGC Mackinaw breaking ice stern first

The first double acting icebreaking vessel, Azipod-equipped river icebreaker Röthelstein, was delivered in 1995. The vessel was designed to break apart ice ridges deeper than the vessel's draft when moving astern. It was followed by icebreaking platform supply vessels Arcticaborg and Antarcticaborg, delivered in 1998, that were the first vessels to fully utilize the double acting ship concept by having the bow designed for operation in open water and light ice conditions. The vessels were designed to be capable of breaking level ice up to one meter in thickness when running astern and, with the help of two Azipod units, penetrate ice ridges that in the Caspian Sea sometimes reach to the seabed.

The Norwegian Coast Guard operates a double acting offshore patrol vessel KV Svalbard, built in 2002 and equipped with two 5 MW Azipod propulsion units. On 9 July 2007, the Canadian Broadcasting Corporation reported that Canadian Prime Minister Stephen Harper had announced that Canada would be building six to eight patrol vessels based on Svalbard. However, since the announcement, the design has progressed from an Azipod-equipped double acting ship to a more traditional shaft-driven version.

Icebreaking supply and standby vessel SCF Sakhalin, delivered in 2005 as FESCO Sakhalin, was the first large-scale double acting icebreaker. The 99-metre (325 ft) vessel, propelled by two 6.5 MW Azipod propulsion units, is designed to break level ice up to 1.5 metres (5 ft) thick and 20-metre (66 ft) ice ridges with a 4-metre (13 ft) consolidated layer. She has since been followed by six vessels based on the same hull form and built at the same shipyard for the offshore operations in the Sea of Okhotsk: platform supply vessels Vitus Bering in 2012, Aleksey Chirikov in 2013 and Gennadiy Nevelskoy in 2017, and standby vessels Stepan Makarov, Fedor Ushakov, and Mikhail Lazarev in 2017. The owner of these vessels, Sovcomflot, also operates three icebreaking platform supply vessels of slightly different design that are capable of breaking ice in astern direction. The 2006-built ships, SCF Endeavour, SCF Enterprise and SCF Endurance, are propelled by two 7 MW Z-drive thrusters and capable of breaking first year ice up to 1.5 metres (5 ft) thick as well as multi-year ridges with a thickness of 4 metres (13 ft).

The 3,500-ton United States Coast Guard multipurpose icebreaker and buoy tender USCGC Mackinaw, delivered in 2005, also incorporates some of the features typical for double acting icebreakers, such as podded propulsion and astern icebreaking capability.

The 25 MW diesel-electric line icebreaker ordered by Rosmorport from Baltic Shipyard under the project name LK-25, Viktor Chernomyrdin, will be capable of proceeding continuously both ahead and astern in compact ice field up to 2 metres (6.6 ft) thick with a 20-centimetre (7.9 in) snow cover at 2 knots (3.7 km/h; 2.3 mph). The hybrid propulsion system of the new icebreaker is a further development of the traditional double acting concept and will consist of two 7.5 MW ABB Azipod units and a fixed 10 MW centerline shaft. The construction of the new polar icebreaker began in 2013 and it is expected to enter service in the Northern Sea Route in 2018.

Gazprom Neft has ordered two 22 MW icebreakers, Aleksandr Sannikov and Andrey Vilkitskiy, from Vyborg Shipyard. The vessels, currently under construction and scheduled to be delivered in 2017, represent a further development of the Finnish icebreaker Polaris with capability of breaking 2-metre (7 ft) ice in both ahead and astern directions.

The new Chinese polar research vessel, currently under construction, will utilize the double acting concept. The Polar Class 3 vessel, fitted with two azimuth thrusters, will be able to break level ice with a thickness of 1.5 metres (5 ft) and a snow cover of 20 centimetres (8 in).

=== Cargo ships ===
==== Tankers ====
In 2001 Fortum ordered two 106,000 DWT double acting Aframax tankers from Sumitomo Heavy Industries Ltd., Japan, to replace the company's older tankers that, because of their lower ice class, had traffic restrictions during the worst part of the winter and could not deliver their cargo all the way to the refineries in Porvoo and Naantali because they were not given icebreaker assistance. When this happened, the oil had to be transported to smaller ships of higher ice class at the edge of the ice — a practice that was both uneconomical and hazardous. The new ships are equipped with one pulling-type 16 MW Azipod unit and have the highest Finnish-Swedish ice class, 1A Super. They are designed to be capable of independent navigation and icebreaking in Baltic ice conditions with a possibility to operate also in the Pechora Sea. The ships follow the double acting principle with a bulbous bow for open water performance and stern designed with icebreaking performance in mind. The first double acting tanker, Tempera, was delivered in 2002 and its sister ship, Mastera, in 2003. The icebreaking capability of the vessels proved to be superior to other ships — in shuttle service between Primorsk, Russia, and the Finnish refineries the tankers required no icebreaker assistance and even acted as icebreakers for other merchant ships. The ships can break level ice up to 1 metre (3.3 ft) thick at 3 knots (5.6 km/h; 3.5 mph) when operating astern.

The Swedish shipping company Donsötank operates four small product tankers that the company refers to as double acting ships. Prospero and Bro Sincero are 18,119 DWT product tankers built in 2000 and 2002, respectively, and equipped with one Siemens Schottel azimuth thruster each. Evinco and Excello are slightly larger at 19,999 DWT. Evinco, built in 2005, is equipped with one Schottel unit and the 2008-built Excello with two smaller Azipod units.

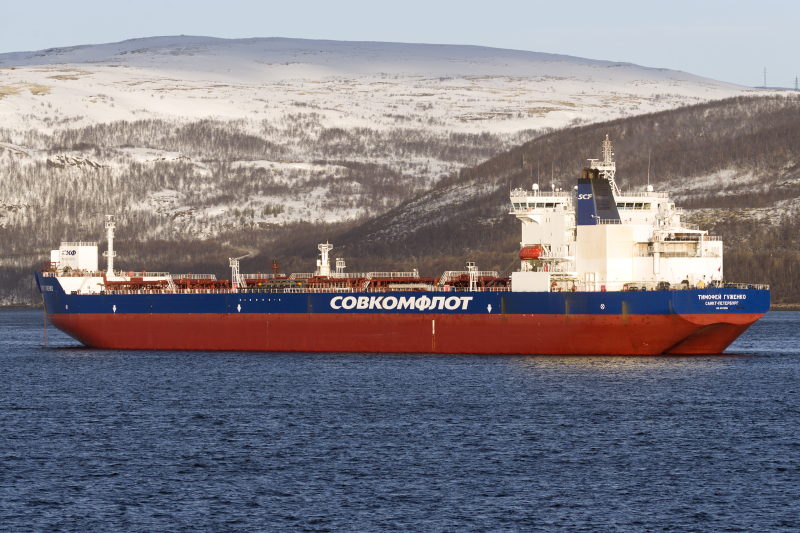
2009-built arctic shuttle tanker Timofey Guzhenko showing its icebreaking stern

In 2007, the Russian state-owned shipping company Sovcomflot ordered three 70,000 DWT double acting arctic shuttle tankers from Samsung Heavy Industries, South Korea, to transport oil from the Varandey oil terminal and two similarly sized ships of slightly different design from Admiralty Shipyard in St. Petersburg, Russia, for the Prirazlomnoye field. The first ship, Vasily Dinkov, was delivered in 2007 and its two sister ships, Kapitan Gotsky and Timofey Guzhenko in 2008 and 2009, respectively. Kirill Lavrov, the first double acting tanker built in a Russian shipyard, was delivered in 2009 and the last of the series, Mikhail Ulyanov, in 2010. The tankers, equipped with two Azipod units, are capable of bow loading and independent operation in level ice up to 1.2 meters in thickness.

In March 2010 Norilsk Nickel placed an order for an Arc7 ice class oil tanker derivate of its double acting arctic cargo ships at Nordic Yards in Wismar. The 18,500 DWT vessel, referred to as the "Nordic AT 19" design, has similar main dimensions, characteristics and capabilities as the company's five icebreaking container vessels. The tanker, named Enisey, was delivered in the end of September 2011.

The double acting ship concept has been selected as the main transportation concept for the Yamal LNG project. In July 2013, Daewoo Shipbuilding & Marine Engineering (DSME) won the tender for the construction of sixteen Arc7 ice class LNG carriers and the contract for the first vessel, worth 339.3 billion won ($316.4 million), was signed in March 2014. The Arctic LNG carriers, fitted with three 15 MW ABB Azipod propulsion units, are the largest icebreaking vessels in the world with an independent ice-going capability in level ice up to 2.1 metres (6.9 ft) in thickness. The first vessel, Christophe de Margerie, was launched in January 2016.

In July 2014, Samsung Heavy Industries received a $440 million order for three ice class Arc7 shuttle tankers for the Russian shipping company Sovcomflot. A follow-up order for the construction of three more tankers of similar design to an unnamed European shipping company at the same price was announced in October 2014. The 42,000 DWT tankers, capable of breaking ice with a thickness of 1.4 metres (4.6 ft) at 3.5 knots (6.5 km/h; 4.0 mph), will be used to transport crude oil from the Novy Port oil fields in the Gulf of Ob to the ice-free port of Murmansk. The first vessel of the series, Shturman Albanov, was launched in early 2016.

==== Freighters ====
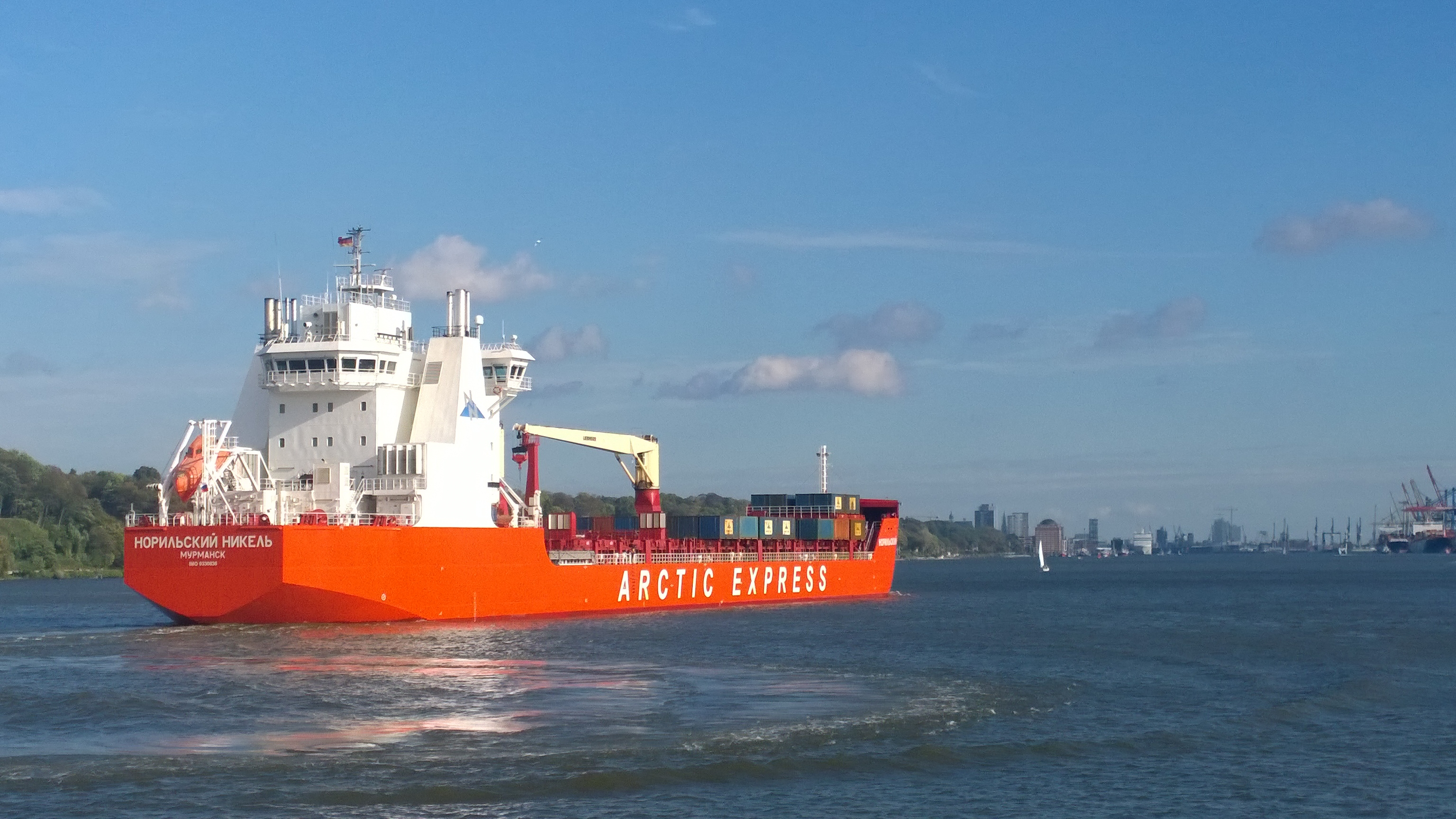
2006-built double acting cargo ship Norilskiy Nickel featuring a secondary bridge for astern operation

The next generation of double acting ships emerged when the Russian mining company Norilsk Nickel ordered a prototype of a series of 14,500 DWT arctic general cargo/container ships intended to replace its ageing fleet of SA-15 type arctic cargo ships that were built in Finland in the 1980s. Unlike the tankers, the Arc7 ice class ship was designed to have excellent icebreaking capability, 2 knots in level ice with a thickness of 1.5 meters, both ahead and astern. The ship, Norilskiy Nickel, was delivered from Hietalahti shipyard in 2006 and performed beyond expectations during ice trials in the Yenisei Gulf. Four additional ships, with an option for fifth, were ordered in 2007 from Aker Yards's shipyards in Germany, with deliveries in the second half of 2008 (Monchegorsk, Zapolyarny and Talnakh) and early 2009 (Nadezdha). Later an oil tanker derivative of the same design was constructed by Nordic Yards.

On 22 March 2011 Gaiamare, a subsidiary of Meriaura, ordered a 115-metre (377 ft) double acting multipurpose cargo ship designed especially for demanding projects such as transporting wind turbines to offshore installations. The new vessel, Meri, was built by STX Finland Turku shipyard and delivered in June 2012. The environmentally friendly ship, designed to run on biofuel, can also be used in oil spill cleanup — the vessel can be equipped with skimmers and has 2,700 m^{3} of tanks for recovered oil. The diesel-electric propulsion with two Siemens Schottel Z-drive thrusters and two bow thrusters allows the ship to maneuver and even move sideways at low speeds, considerably increasing the oil recovery rate.

== See also ==
- Oblique icebreaker – Asymmetric icebreaker that can break ice sideways to open a wide channel
