= Yantar, Kaliningrad =

Special economic zone in Kaliningrad Oblast, Russia

Coordinates: 54.694°N 20.443°E

The Yantar Special Economic Zone is a Special Economic Zone in Russia that was established in 1996 in the Kaliningrad Oblast of the Russian Federation.

"Yantar" means amber in Russian. Amber has been collected along the Baltic coasts of present-day Kaliningrad Oblast since ancient times, and though some sites are still worked today the yield is relatively modest.

== Background ==
After the dissolution of the former Soviet Union (USSR) in 1992/1993 the Russian Socialist Federal Republic (RSFSR) remained as the largest of the original 15 republics. It comprised nearly 75% of the territory of the former USSR. In 1994 it was renamed the "Russian Federation" (RF). The Kaliningrad Region (Kaliningrad Oblast) is one of the 89 provinces (so-called "subjects of the federation" ) that make up the RF.

Each of these provinces has its own constitution as well as its own provincial parliament. However, they vary greatly in status, ranging from that of Republics within the RF (e.g. Tatarstan) over Greater Regions (kraya) and Regions (oblasti), Autonomous Districts (avtonomnye rajony) and so-called "Metropolitan Areas of Federal Significance" (the cities of Moscow and St Petersburg).

An opaque feature of Russian federalism is that the federation and the subjects of the federation have the power to specify, limit and even re-arrange their competencies through treaties and arrangements ("Negotiated federalism"). The Kaliningrad Oblast concluded such an arrangement with the Russian Federation on January 12, 1996. This included detailed stipulations, among others, for the later Special Economic Zone (SEZ) in the Kaliningrad Region (the Yantar SEZ).

== The Kaliningrad Region (Kaliningrad Oblast) ==
The Kaliningrad Region is one of the smallest provinces (subject of the federation) of the Russian Federation. It is also the westernmost part of the Russian Federation and has no land border with the federation itself, forming an exclave bordering the Baltic Sea (West), Lithuania (North and East), and Poland (South). It comprises an area of roughly 15,000 square kilometers with a population of about 1 million.

Historically, this region had been part of Prussia since the early 13th century and subsequently became part of the German Empire (Deutsches Reich), forming its easternmost province (East Prussia – Ostpreußen) with the capital Königsberg (now Kaliningrad). After World War II the region was annexed by the USSR in accordance with the Potsdam Agreement (July/August 1945) and its five million German residents were expelled. In 1946, the USSR incorporated the region into the RSFSR under the name "Kaliningrad Oblast". For the following 45 years the region was predominantly used as a military base. Kaliningrad is located 600 km from Berlin, 300 km from Warsaw, 831 km from St. Petersburg, and 1,000 km from Moscow.

== The concept of Free Economic Zones in Russia and the Yantar Special Economic Zone ==
Beginning from the early 1990s, Free Economic Zones mushroomed in the Russian Federation. However, as a result of poor planning, most of them failed. Today, only a few of them can be said to have had moderate success, among them the Yantar Special Economic Zone (SEZ).

The Yantar SEZ provides a customs-free zone, as well as low-tax provisions with regard to corporate profit tax and corporate property tax. These provisions are, however, spread over several provincial (oblast) and federal statutes. Further, the various acts suffer from poor legal drafting and contain a number of ambiguities. Finally, the customs-free regime of the Yantar SEZ has been challenged by hostile federal law several times. In 2006, yet another restrictive federal law governing the Yantar SEZ was enacted. It limits the lifespan of the Yantar SEZ to 25 years, i.e. up to 2030 (Section 21 of the Act).

The prospects of the Yantar SEZ are uncertain: In the early years after its establishment, during the period 1995-1997, it seemed to evolve into an emerging Russian province (the much talked-about "Hong Kong on the Baltic Sea"), thanks to its proximity to the European Union. Contrary to legislative intention, however, it did not develop into an export zone (product assembly), but instead turned into an import zone for German and Polish consumable goods. After the Russian financial crisis in mid-1998 it rapidly turned into a near-failure. This was mainly due to a combination of both administrative inefficiency and the federal and oblast governments' unwillingness to make the Yantar SEZ sufficiently attractive with tax incentives. More recent studies (2003), however, indicate a moderate economic upswing.

Its main trading partner has been Germany and the bulk of foreign investment in the Yantar SEZ comes from German enterprises.

== The Yantar projects ==
The Yantar projects are based mainly at the local factories. The facilities are situated in Kaliningrad (e.g., Avtotor as well as in the oblast (e.g., NPO CTS).

This article states the FEZ's legal and economic situation as at the end of 2004.
