= Railo Technology =

Finnish engineering company

Railo Technology Oy
- Company type: Osakeyhtiö
- Founded: 30 December 2004; 21 years ago
- Headquarters: Helsinki, Finland
- Key people: Mika Hovilainen (Managing Director and CEO)
- Services: Ship design; Ice model testing; Consulting; Marine propulsion
- Revenue: ▲€15,227,446 (2024); €10,438,360 (2023)
- Operating income: ▼–€1,350,867 (2024); €545,773 (2023)
- Owner: Finnish Industry Investment; ABB
- Number of employees: 57 (12/2024)
- Website: railotech.fi

Railo Technology, branded as Railotech, is a Finnish engineering company that operates an ice model test basin in Helsinki. In addition to ship model testing, the company offers various design, engineering and consulting services related to icebreakers, other icegoing vessels and arctic offshore projects as well as full scale trials, field expeditions and training for icy conditions. Formerly the arctic research centre of Wärtsilä and later Masa-Yards, it was established as an independent company on 30 December 2004 and was known as Aker Arctic until March 2026. Railo Technology's major shareholder is the Finnish Industry Investment with ABB holding a minority ownership.

Railo Technology and its predecessors have designed more than half of the world's icebreakers. In addition, the company is responsible for a number of recent inventions in the design of icegoing ships, such as the double acting ship and oblique icebreaker concepts.

== History ==
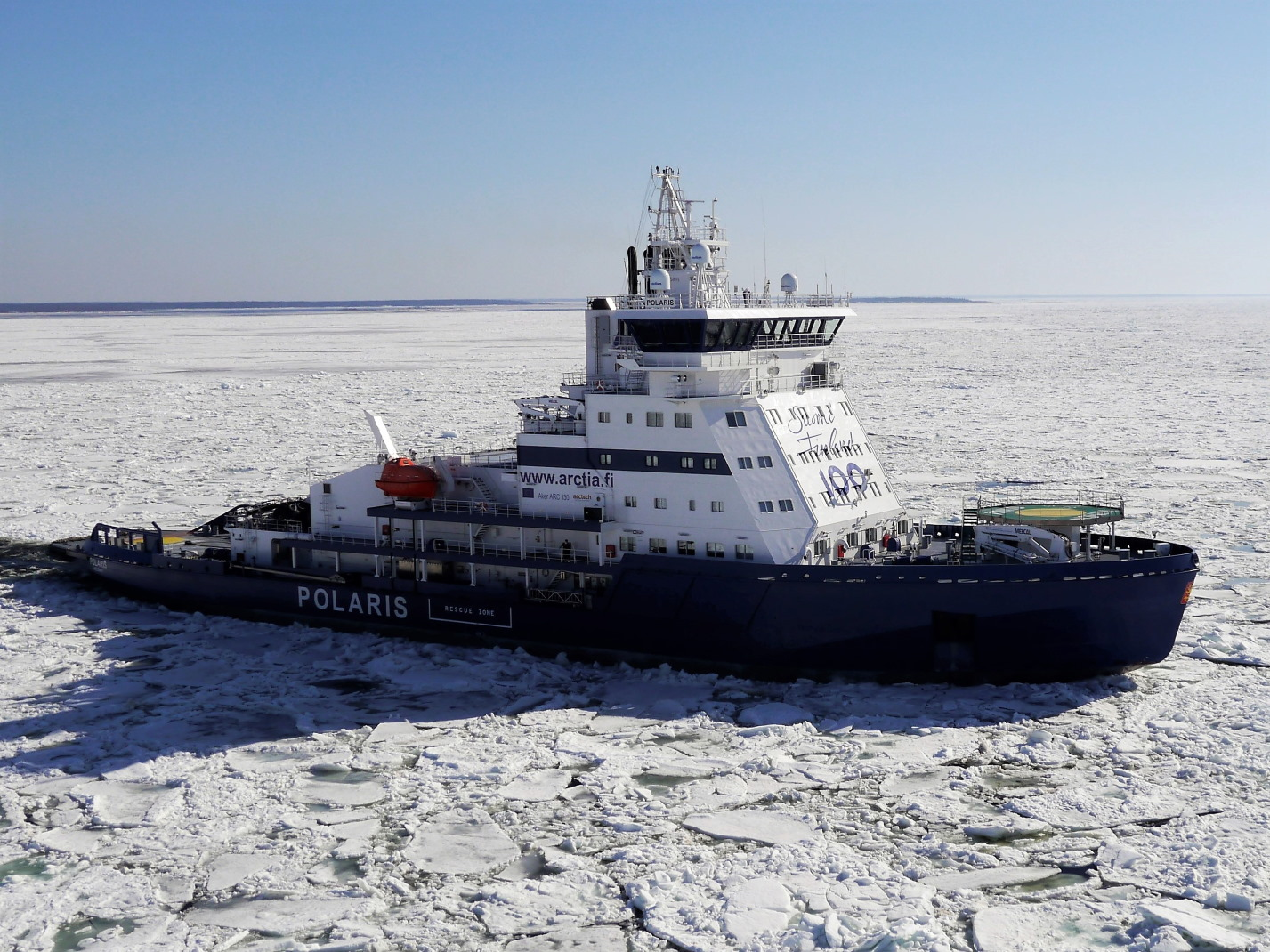
Finnish icebreaker Polaris, built in 2016, is based on Aker Arctic's Aker ARC 130 design

The history of ice model testing in Finland began when Wärtsilä Icebreaking Model Basin (WIMB) was opened in a converted air raid shelter in Helsinki in 1969. The second ice test basin in the world, preceded by and modeled after the 1955-built Arctic and Antarctic Research Institute in Leningrad, Soviet Union, was a result of co-operation between Wärtsilä and Esso International, initially created for developing the hull form of the icebreaking oil tanker SS Manhattan. Later Wärtsilä, already an experienced and widely recognized builder of icebreaking ships, utilized the 50-metre (160 ft) test basin for its own projects at a time when Helsinki New Shipyard was continuously building new icebreakers. In the early 1980s, a decision was made to construct a new model test facility above ground.

Wärtsilä Arctic Research Centre (WARC), inaugurated in February 1983, was intended to become the leading ice model test facility in the world. The model basin measuring 77.3 metres (254 ft) in length utilized a new type of inhouse-developed fine-grained model ice which was later licensed to Krylov Shipbuilding Research Institute (KSRI) in Russia and the ice model basin at the Helsinki University of Technology in Finland. In the mid-1980s, WARC also took over the responsibilities of Wärtsilä Arctic Design and Marketing (WADAM), a separate department which offered design and consultancy services to outside clients. In addition to inhouse R&D and commercial projects, the work carried out by WARC included basic research conducted by post-graduate students and research for the Finnish government. The work setup continued until the bankruptcy of Wärtsilä Marine in 1989.

When Masa-Yards took over the shipbuilding business of Wärtsilä in 1989, WARC became known as Masa-Yards Arctic Research Centre (MARC). Although initially scientific projects gained high priority, from 1990 on the work was primarily commercial. When Kværner, the owner of Masa-Yards since 1991, merged with its rival company Aker ASA and withdrew from the shipbuilding business in the early 2000s, it was decided to establish a new company to separate the arctic research department from the turbulent shipbuilding business. In addition, as the land lease agreement was reaching its end, a decision was made to construct a new model test facility elsewhere.

The company was established as Aker Arctic on 30 December 2004 with Kværner Masa-Yards (Aker Yards since 2006, STX Finland since 2009) as its major shareholder and ABB, Aker Kværner (later Aker Solutions) and Wärtsilä as minor shareholders. Wärtsilä later withdrew from the joint company and sold its shares to the other shareholders. The construction of the new model test facility with a 75-metre (246 ft) model basin began in Vuosaari, near the old shipyard, in 2005 and the company moved to its current premises in February 2006.

On 17 December 2013, the state-owned holding company Finnish Industry Investment (Suomen Teollisuussijoitus; Tesi) purchased 66.4% of Aker Arctic's shares from STX Finland which previously owned 71.4% of the company. The remainder was divided equally between then minor shareholders, ABB and Aker Solutions, who both increased their share from 14.3% to 16.8%. According to the Minister of Economic Affairs Jan Vapaavuori, the company was acquired in order to prevent it from being sold to a foreign owner and as part of a funding arrangement for STX Finland.

Aker Arctic changed its name to Railo Technology in March 2026 and began using Railotech as its brand name.

During its time as an independent company, Railo Technology has acquired two other companies: the Canada-based consulting company AKAC in 2015 and the Finnish ship design and engineering company Bluetech Finland in 2025.
