= Sovcomflot =

Russian shipping company

- Type: State-owned corporation
- Traded as: MCX: FLOT
- Industry: Shipping
- Founded: 1988
- Headquarters: Saint Petersburg
- Area served: Worldwide
- Key people: Sergey Frank (Chairman of the Board of Directors of PAO Sovcomflot); Igor Tonkovidov (Member of the Board of Directors, President and Chief Executive Officer of PAO Sovcomflot)
- Revenue: $1.44 billion (2017; 2025)
- Operating income: $−523 million (2025)
- Net income: $−648 million (2025)
- Total assets: $6.94 billion (2025)
- Total equity: $4.66 billion (2025)
- Owner: Government of Russia (82.8%)
- Number of employees: 7,700 (2019)
- Website: Official website

Sovcomflot (Russian: ПАО «Совкомфлот», ПАО «Современный коммерческий флот», lit. 'Modern Commercial Fleet') is Russia's largest shipping company, and one of the global leaders in the maritime transportation of hydrocarbons, as well as the servicing and support of offshore exploration and oil and gas production.

== History ==
In 1973, the Council of Ministers of the Soviet Union issued a resolution the formation of a special shipping corporation, separated from the regular state-owned marine fleet, that could use a long-term bareboat charter scheme for purchasing new and used foreign-built vessels. In 1976, the Ministry of Merchant Marine instituted a special fund and the newly formed corporation used it to acquire two 40,000 DWT, dry cargo transports – Sovfracht and Sovinflot.

In 1988 these operations were reorganized as the Sovcomflot Joint-Stock Company (SCF), a then one-of-a-kind state-owned corporation with special authorization by the USSR Council of Ministers. By 1990 its assets reached a gross tonnage carrying capacity of 1,800,000 DWT. A further reorganization in June 1995 confirmed the special status of Sovcomflot as a state-owned business.

In June 2007, President of Russia Vladimir Putin signed a decree authorizing the merger of Sovcomflot and Novoship; the state 'invested' its 50.34% share in Novoship in Sovcomflot capital. The legal procedures were completed in early 2008 and in January 2008 Sovcomflot offered a stock buyout to the remaining minority shareholders of Novoship. The integration of Novoship assets into Sovcomflot operations continues as of August 2008 (fleet management and sales were unified in July 2008).

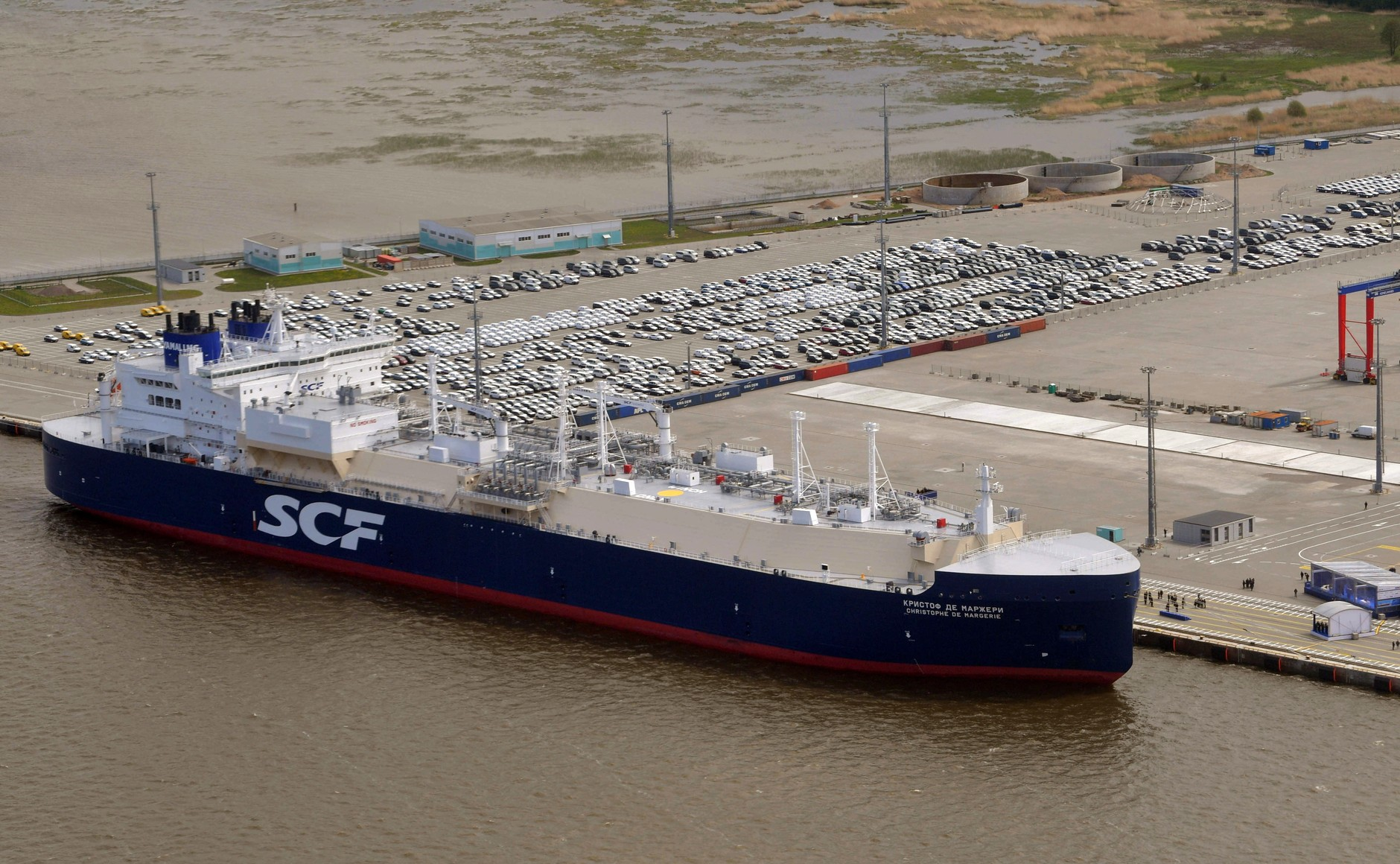
SCF LNG tanker Christophe de Margerie

In August 2017, the Christophe de Margerie, a tanker owned by Sovcomflot, became the first cargo ship to complete the so-called Northern Sea Route, completing a journey from Hammerfest in Norway to Boryeong in South Korea in the record time of 22 days.

== Sanctions ==
On 24 February 2022 the U.S. Department of the Treasury’s Office of Foreign Assets Control (OFAC) sanctioned Sovcomflot under E.O. 14024 for being owned or controlled by, or having acted or purposed to act for or on behalf of, directly or indirectly, the GoR. Subsidiary companies were also sanctioned.

On 15 March 2022, as a result of the 2022 Russian invasion of Ukraine the EU imposed sanctions on Sovcomflot. On 24 March 2022, the United Kingdom followed suit. Sovcomflot has also been sanctioned by Canada and the United States has prohibited Sovcomflot from raising funds on American capital markets. The American sanctions made it very difficult for Sovcomflot to obtain insurance for its vessels and cargoes. This has led many Asian customers to cancel orders for Sokol, one of three main export-grade crude oils sold by Russia. On 20 April, New Zealand also announced sanctions.

On 5 May 2022, Lloyds List reported that Sovcomflot intended to sell up to a third of its fleet in order to generate cash to pay off creditors. Sovcomflot called the report "exaggerated" and "rumours", and said it was merely selling off old facilities and vessels.

On 10 June 2022, the Russian National Reinsurance Company announced it would reinsure Russian ships including Sovcomflot's when the Russian shipping industry was left high and dry by the 2022 sanctions. It came to light on 13 June that Ingosstrakh had insured the Sovcomflot fleet. On 23 June 2022 the Indian Register of Shipping announced that it would provide safety certification for several dozen ships managed by Dubai-based SCF Management Services, a subsidiary of Sovcomflot. The CEO said on 18 June that Sovcomflot had insured all its cargo vessels with Russian insurers.

On 23 February 2024, the U.S. Department of the Treasury’s Office of Foreign Assets Control (OFAC) imposed sanctions on Sovcomflot, targeting its revenue from oil sales to further restrict Russia's financial capabilities in light of its invasion of Ukraine. The sanctions include freezing U.S. assets of Sovcomflot and designating 14 of its crude oil tankers, while allowing temporary transactions to offload oil from these vessels.

== Fleet ==
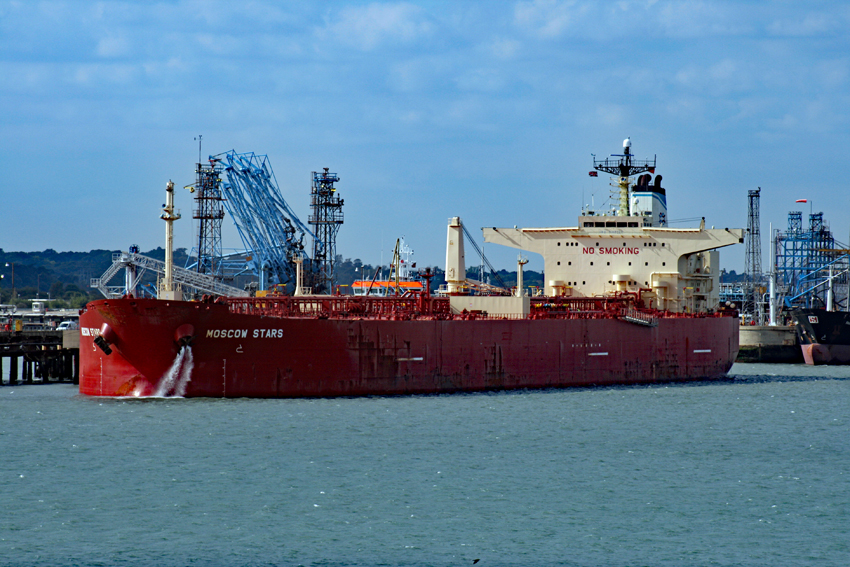
Moscow Stars oil tanker at Fawley Refinery

As of May 2022, the company owned 122 vessels. The fleet includes 50 crude oil tankers, 34 oil products tankers, 14 shuttle tankers, and 10 natural gas carriers. Sovcomflot also owns 10 icebreakers.

== Management ==
The company is registered in Saint-Petersburg and has representative offices in Moscow, Novorossiysk, Murmansk, Vladivostok, Yuzhno-Sakhalinsk, London, Limassol and Dubai.

Sovcomflot board of directors has traditionally been led by executives appointed by the Presidential Administration of Russia. In July 2007, Igor Shuvalov, long-time chairman of the board and an aide to Vladimir Putin, was replaced by Sergey Naryshkin, chief of staff of Presidential Administration. Other directors were in 2007: Andrey Kostin (Vneshtorgbank), Yury Medvedev, Alexander Misharin, Gleb Nikitin, Charles E. Ryan (of Deutsche Bank), Aleksey Sokolov, Elena Titova (Morgan Stanley), Alexander Tikhonov, Sergey Frank (Chief Executive Officer).

Sergey Frank controlled the operations as CEO from October 2004 until at least 2012. The Management Board also included as of 2012: Sergey Burima (operations), Nicholas Fairfax (London operations), Andrey Khlunev (accounting), Nikolay Kolesnikov (finance), Aleksandr Kurtynin (audit), Callum Ludgate (charter and gas), Vladimir Mednikov (law), Sergey Popravko (Cyprus operations).

As of August 2019, Frank was still CEO, while Nikolay Kolesnikov was CFO and Igor Tonkovidov was chief operating officer and chief technical officer.

== See also ==
- Sovtorgflot
