= United Shipbuilding Corporation =

Largest Shipbuilding Company in Russia

JSC "United Shipbuilding Corporation"

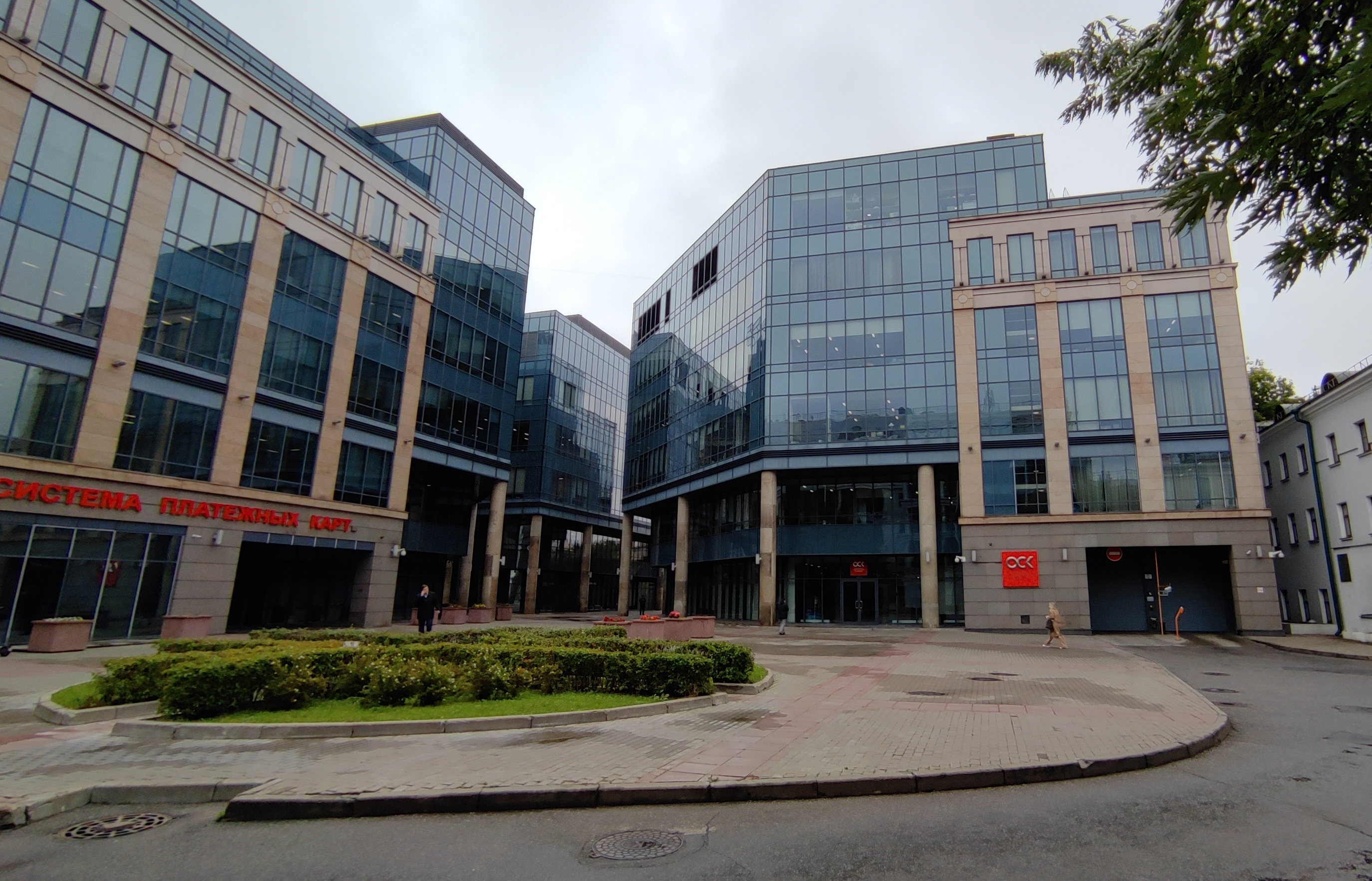
- Moscow office, Russia
- Trade name: United Shipbuilding Corporation - ОСК
- Native name: Russian: АО Объединённая Судостроительная Корпорация
- Company type: State owned enterprise
- Industry: Shipbuilding, Defense industry
- Founded: March 21, 2007; 19 years ago
- Headquarters: Saint Petersburg, Russia
- Area served: Worldwide
- Key people: Andrey Kostin (Chairman); Andrey Sergeyevich Puchkov (President)
- Products: Merchant ships, naval ships, submarines, missiles
- Revenue: $5.58 billion (2017)
- Operating income: $247 million (2017)
- Net income: $101 million (2017)
- Total assets: $15.1 billion (2017)
- Total equity: $1.92 billion (2017)
- Owner: Federal Agency for State Property Management (100%)
- Number of employees: >80,000 (2016)
- Parent: Government of Russia
- Website: www.aoosk.ru

JSC United Shipbuilding Corporation (USC; Russian: Объединённая судостроительная корпорация, ОСК) is an open joint stock company in Russia which unites shipbuilding, repair and maintenance subsidiaries in western and northern Russia, and in the country's Far East, to streamline civilian shipbuilding using military facilities.

As of 2021, the corporation constructed up to 80% of ships in Russia.

== History ==
United Shipbuilding Corporation was established in 2007 by a series of Presidential Decrees signed by President Vladimir Putin. According to the decree, the corporation has 3 subsidiaries: the Western Shipbuilding Center in St. Petersburg (Admiralty Shipyard), the Northern Shipbuilding and Maintenance Center in Severodvinsk and the Far Eastern Shipbuilding and Maintenance Center in Vladivostok. The state owns 100% of the shares.

In June 2012 Andrei Dyachkov was appointed to its president.

On May 21, 2013, Russian President Putin said that Vladimir Shmakov would be appointed as a new president of the corporation the following week.

On 29 July 2014, the company was sanctioned by the United States.

In 2016, the company's revenue amounted to 49 billion rubles.

In 2017, the corporation closed its Northern and Western subsidiary branches.

USC was the owner of Arctech Helsinki Shipyard, having bought the remaining 50% of the shares from its joint venture partner STX Finland Cruise Oy. In May 2019, USC sold the Finnish venture to a Russian businessman, who changed the name to Helsinki Shipyard.

On 25 August 2023 Andrey Kostin was elected Chairman of the board of directors of USC. He had been nominated by prime minister Mikhail Mishustin, along with 12 other board members including Andrey Puchkov. Both men control VTB Bank, a state-owned operation.

=== Sanctions ===
As a result of the Russian invasion of Ukraine, the company was sanctioned by New Zealand, as well as by the United Kingdom.

== Structure ==
As of 2017, USC integrated the following companies:

- 33 Shipyard, Baltiysk
- Admiralty Shipyards, St. Petersburg
- Baltic Shipyard, St. Petersburg
- Vyborg Shipyard, Vyborg
- Zelenodolsk Design Bureau, Zelenodolsk
- Severnaya Verf, St. Petersburg
- Sredne-Nevskiy Shipyard, St. Petersburg
- Severnoye Design Bureau, St. Petersburg
- Arctech Helsinki Shipyard, Helsinki
- Nevskoe Design Bureau, Severodvinsk
- Almaz Design Bureau, St. Petersburg
- Krasnoye Sormovo Shipyard, Nizhny Novgorod
- Rubin Design Bureau, St. Petersburg
- Onega Research and Development Technological Bureau, Severodvinsk
- Malakhit Marine Engineering Bureau, St. Petersburg
- 10 Shipyard, Polyarny
- Yantar Shipyard, Kaliningrad
- Amur Shipbuilding Plant, Komsomolsk-on-Amur
- Zvezdochka Shipyard, Severodvinsk
- Proletarsky zavod, St. Petersburg
- Khabarovskiy shipbuilding plant, Khabarovsk
- USC-Iceberg Central Design Bureau, St. Petersburg
- CNRG Group, Astrakhan
- Production Association Arktika, Severodvinsk
- Production Association Sevmash, Severodvinsk
- Svetlovsky enterprise ERA, Svetly
- 35 SRZ branch of Zvezdochka SRC, Murmansk
- Joint Stock Company Shipbuilding plant 'Lotos', Narimanov
- Kronstadt Marine Plant, Kronstadt
- Sevastopol Shipyard
- Lazurit Central Design Bureau
