= Carnival Sensation =

Fantasy-class cruise ship

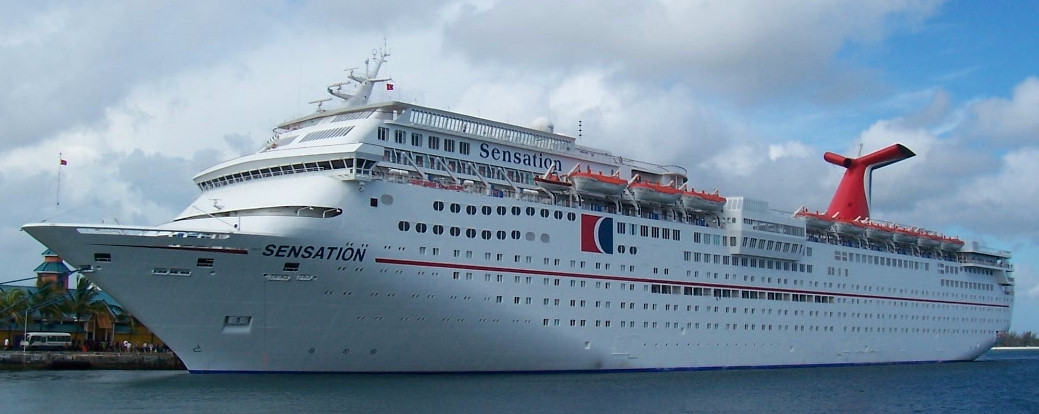
- Sensation at Nassau in 2006

History
- Name: Sensation (1993–2007); Carnival Sensation (2007–2022)
- Owner: Carnival Corporation & plc
- Operator: Carnival Cruise Lines
- Port of registry: Nassau, Bahamas
- Route: Bahamas, Caribbean
- Builder: Kvaerner Masa-Yards; Helsinki New Shipyard; Helsinki, Finland
- Cost: US$250 million
- Yard number: 484
- Sponsored by: Vicki L. Freed; Roberta Jacoby; Cherie Weinstein; Geri Donnelly
- Completed: 1993
- Maiden voyage: November 1, 1993
- In service: 1993
- Out of service: March 19, 2022
- Refit: 2009
- Identification: Call sign: C6FM8; IMO number: 8711356; MMSI number: 309697000
- Fate: Scrapped in 2022

General characteristics
- Class & type: Fantasy-class cruise ship
- Tonnage: 70,367 GT; 7,180 DWT
- Length: 855 ft (261 m)
- Beam: 103 ft (31 m)
- Draft: 25 ft 7 in (7.80 m)
- Decks: 10
- Installed power: 2 × Sulzer-Wärtsilä 8ZAV40S; 4 × Sulzer-Wärtsilä 12ZAV40S; 42,240 kW (combined)
- Propulsion: Two propellers
- Speed: 21 knots (39 km/h; 24 mph)
- Capacity: 2,052
- Crew: 920

Carnival Sensation, initially named Sensation, was a 70,367 GT cruise ship operated by Carnival Cruise Line. She was built in 1993 in Finland and cruised from Florida, United States, to ports in the Bahamas and the Caribbean Sea until the COVID-19 pandemic stopped operations in March 2020. The ship was subsequently sold for scrapping.

== Construction ==
Sensation was the third Fantasy-class cruise ship operated by Carnival. Built by Kværner Masa-Yards at its Helsinki New Shipyard in Helsinki, Finland, she was floated out on November 1, 1993, and christened Sensation by four Carnival Vice Presidents: Vicki L. Freed, Roberta Jacoby, Cherie Weinstein and Geri Donnelly.

== Service history ==
Sensation was one of several cruise ships chartered by the US Government in 2005 to provide accommodation for residents and relief workers following Hurricane Katrina. After being released from Federal Emergency Management Agency service, the Carnival Sensation undertook cruises from Port Canaveral.

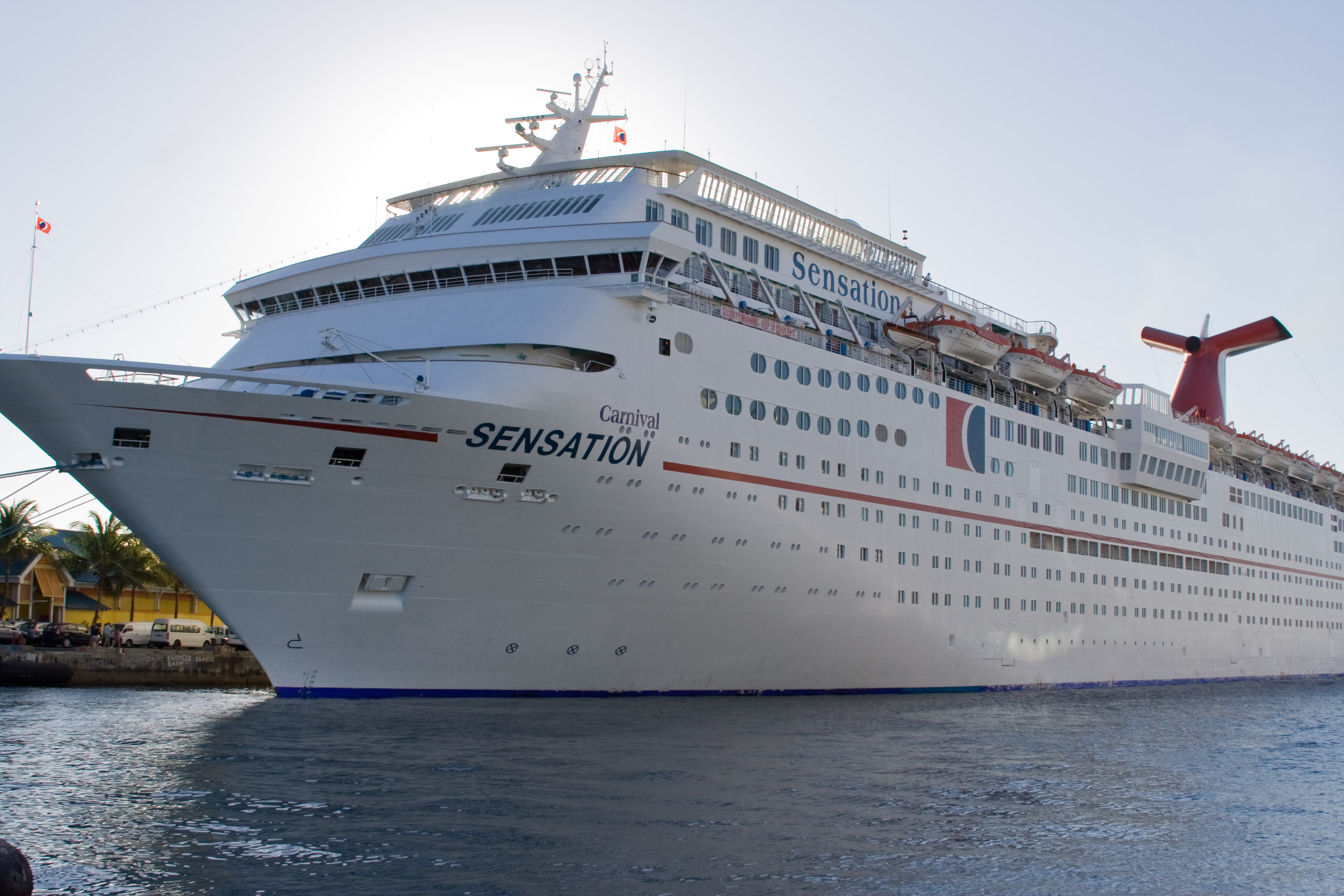
Carnival Sensation after renaming

During 2007, in common with all of her Fantasy-class sisters, she had the prefix Carnival added to her name.

In early 2016, Carnival Sensation moved to Miami, replacing Carnival Victory, doing 4-and-5-night cruises. Carnival Victory took over the 3- and 4-night cruises to Nassau and Freeport, Bahamas, in the Bahamas.

In February 2018, the company announced that Carnival Sensation would take 17 sailings to Cuba in 2019.

In July 2020, the company announced that Carnival Sensation would move to Mobile, Alabama to replace Carnival Fantasy at the Alabama Cruise Terminal. Carnival Fantasy was retired and sold amid the ongoing COVID-19 pandemic. Carnival Sensation was to take over itineraries already scheduled aboard Carnival Fantasy and Carnival Fascination. However, it was announced in February 2022, that Carnival would retire both Carnival Sensation as well as Carnival Ecstasy from the fleet. The latter would remain in service until October 2022, and Carnival Sensation would not return to service. In February 2022 it was reported that the ship had been sold for US$11 million, and on March 18, 2022, sailed from Miami for Aliağa, Turkey, for scrapping. It was beached on April 5, 2022.
