= Carnival Imagination =

Cruise ship built in 1995

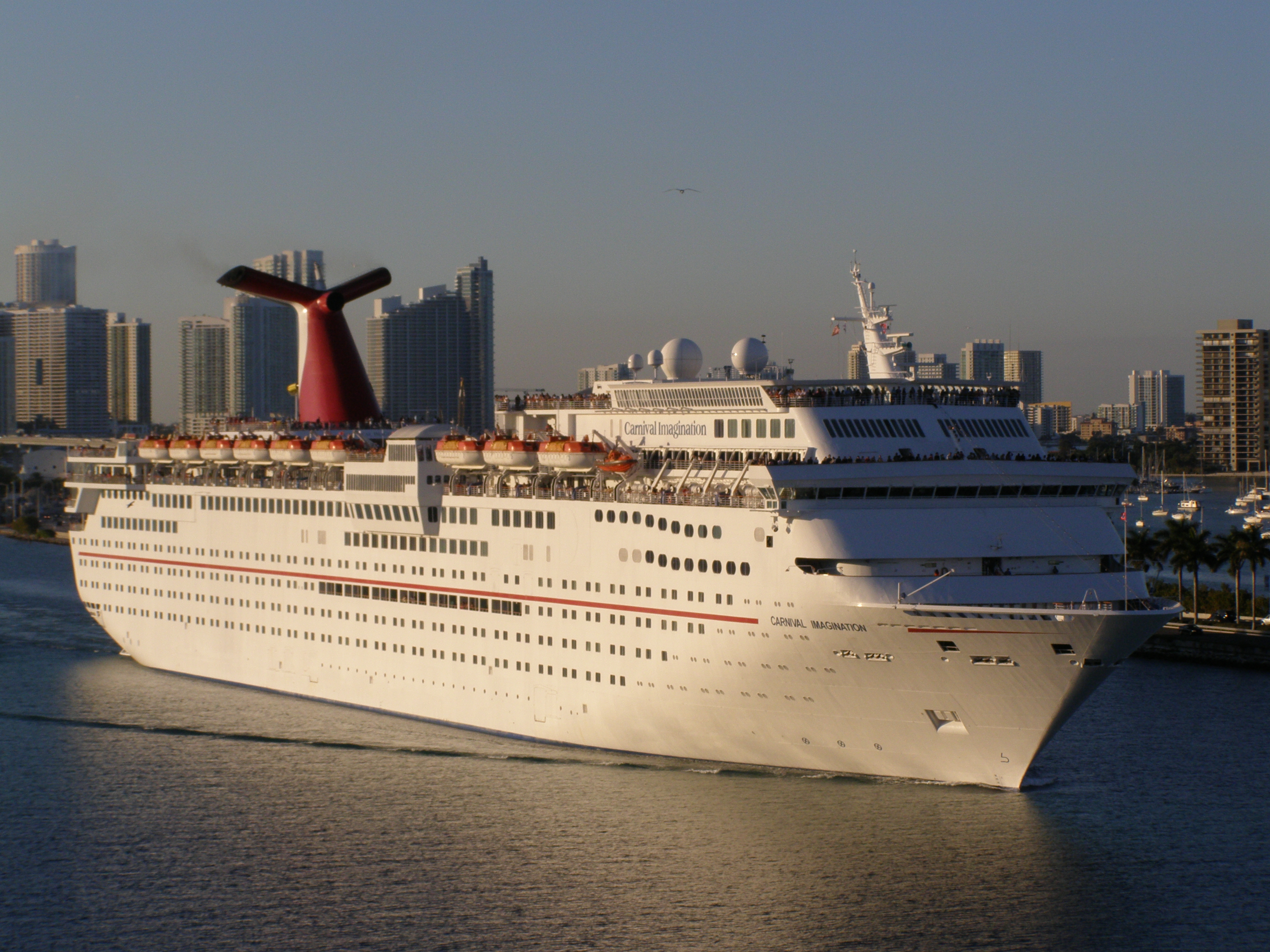
- Carnival Imagination leaving PortMiami

History
- Name: Imagination (1995–2007); Carnival Imagination (2007–2020)
- Owner: Carnival Corporation & plc
- Port of registry: 1995–2000: Panama City, Panama; 2000–2020: Nassau, Bahamas
- Builder: Kvaerner Masa-Yards; Helsinki New Shipyard; Helsinki, Finland
- Yard number: 488
- Laid down: June 30, 1993
- Launched: October 1994
- Sponsored by: Jodi Dickinson
- Completed: June 8, 1995
- In service: 1995–2020
- Out of service: March 2020
- Refit: 2007, 2016
- Identification: Call sign: C6FN2; IMO number: 9053878; MMSI number: 309933000
- Fate: Sold for scrap, 2020

General characteristics
- Class & type: Fantasy-class cruise ship
- Tonnage: 70,367 GT; 7,180 DWT
- Length: 855 ft (261 m)
- Beam: 103 ft (31 m)
- Draft: 7.80 m (25 ft 7 in)
- Decks: 14
- Installed power: 2 × Sulzer-Wärtsilä 8ZAV40S; 4 × Sulzer-Wärtsilä 12ZAV40S; 42,240 kW (combined)
- Propulsion: Two propellers
- Speed: 21 knots (39 km/h; 24 mph)
- Capacity: 2,056 passengers (lower berths); 2,634 passengers (all berths)
- Crew: 920

Carnival Imagination (formerly Imagination) was a Fantasy-class cruise ship operated by Carnival Cruise Line from 1995 to 2020. Built by Kværner Masa-Yards at its Helsinki New Shipyard in Helsinki, Finland, she was floated out on July 1, 1995, and christened Imagination by Jodi Dickinson. During 2007, in common with all of her Fantasy-class sisters, she had the prefix Carnival added to her name.

The ship underwent an extensive multimillion-dollar renovation in September 2016.

Due to the COVID-19 pandemic, Carnival Cruise Line suspended all North American itineraries from March 14 to April 10, 2020. In July 2020, as a result of Carnival Cruise Line reducing fleet capacity, Carnival Imagination entered a long term lay-up status, with no planned date for the ship to enter back into service.

By August 26, 2020, the vessel had filed a cruise plan for Aliağa, Turkey, the location of several ship breaking facilities. Some industry sources indicated that the vessel would be scrapped. The vessel arrived in Aliağa on September 14, 2020, and was beached on 16 September. From September 2020 until February 2023 she remained beached awaiting scrapping; some sources claimed that an unnamed hotel had been trying to acquire some of her fittings that would otherwise be damaged or destroyed during the scrapping process. The scrapping process began in February 2023.

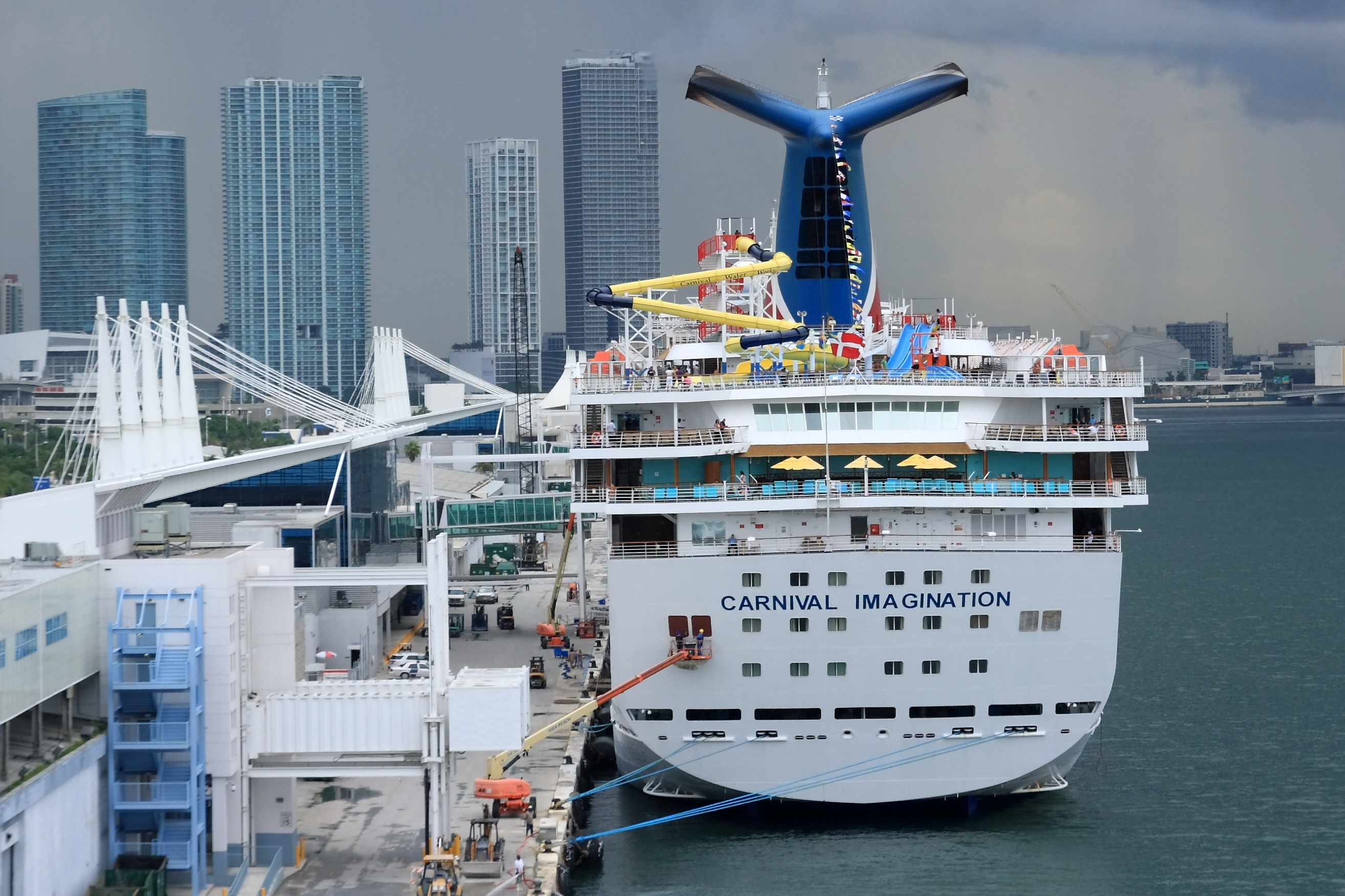
Waterslides aboard the Carnival Imagination

== Areas of operation ==
Prior to entering into a long term lay-up in July 2020, she sailed three- and four-day itineraries from Long Beach, California, to Catalina Island, California, and to Ensenada, Baja California, Mexico.

== Incidents ==
=== Collision with Carnival Fantasy ===
In July 2011, Carnival Fantasy struck Carnival Imagination while performing a maneuver for mooring. Carnival Imagination was docked when the incident occurred. Minor hull damage was sustained to both ships' sterns, and no injuries were reported.

=== Coronavirus pandemic ===
During the coronavirus pandemic, the CDC reported, as early as April 22, 2020, that at least one person who tested positive for SARS-CoV-2 had tested positive within 14 days after disembarking.

=== Sale of the vessel ===
Carnival announced to investors in late July 2020 that it planned to remove the "less efficient" of its ships from the fleet; most of the 15 would be sold and a few would be "recycled". While the Carnival Imagination had been said to be heading for long-term layup, some industry insiders believed that Carnival would dispose of this vessel.

In late August, media reports indicated the ship had filed a plan to travel to Aliağa, Turkey, where she would likely be scrapped. Carnival Fantasy and Carnival Inspiration were already at the scrap yards in that city. The ship left the US for the last time on August 27, 2020, heading towards Aliağa. She arrived at Aliağa on September 14, 2020.

Based on a photograph accompanying an article in The New York Times October 30, 2020 entitled "Where Cruise Ships Go to Die" the Carnival Imagination is being scrapped in Aliaga, Turkey.

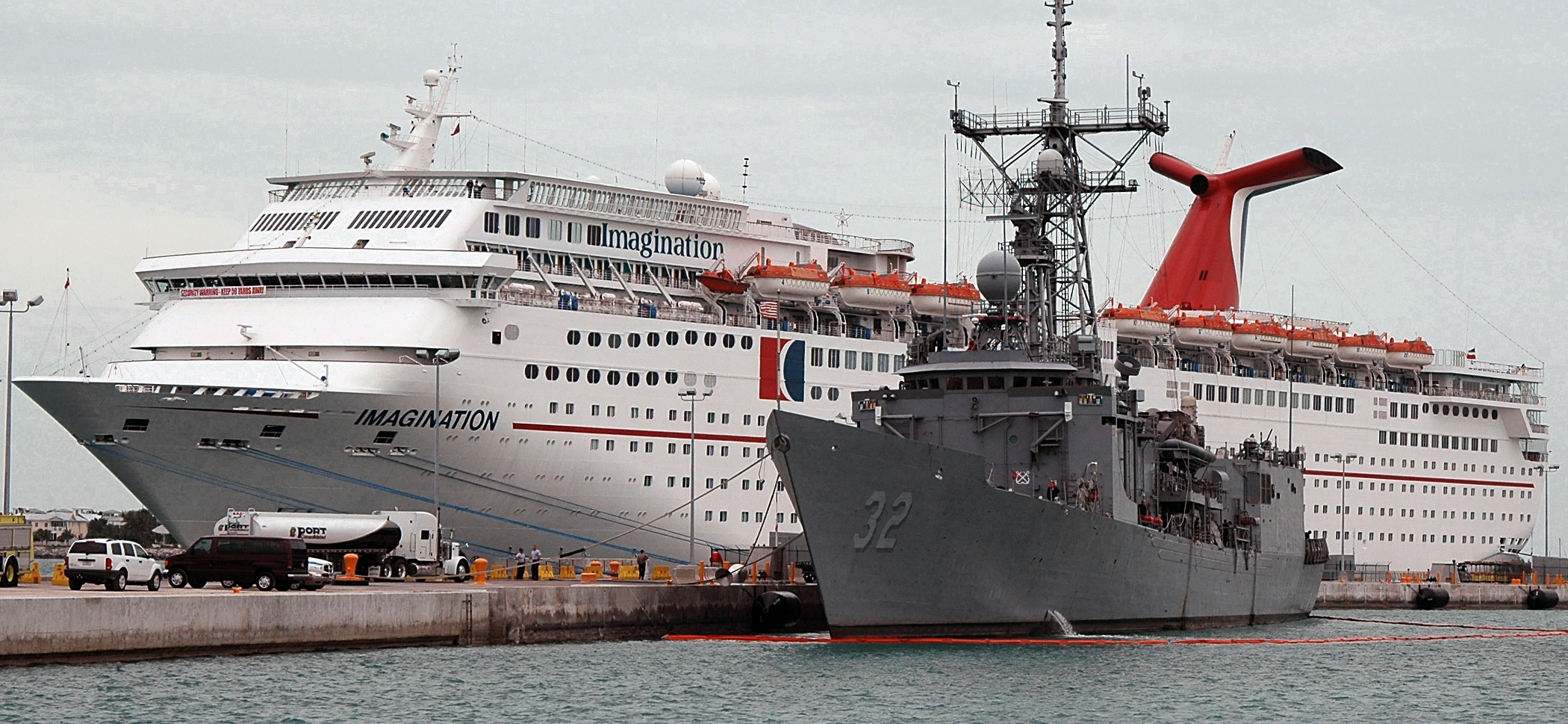
Imagination and USS John L. Hall in Key West.
