= Port of Jacksonville =

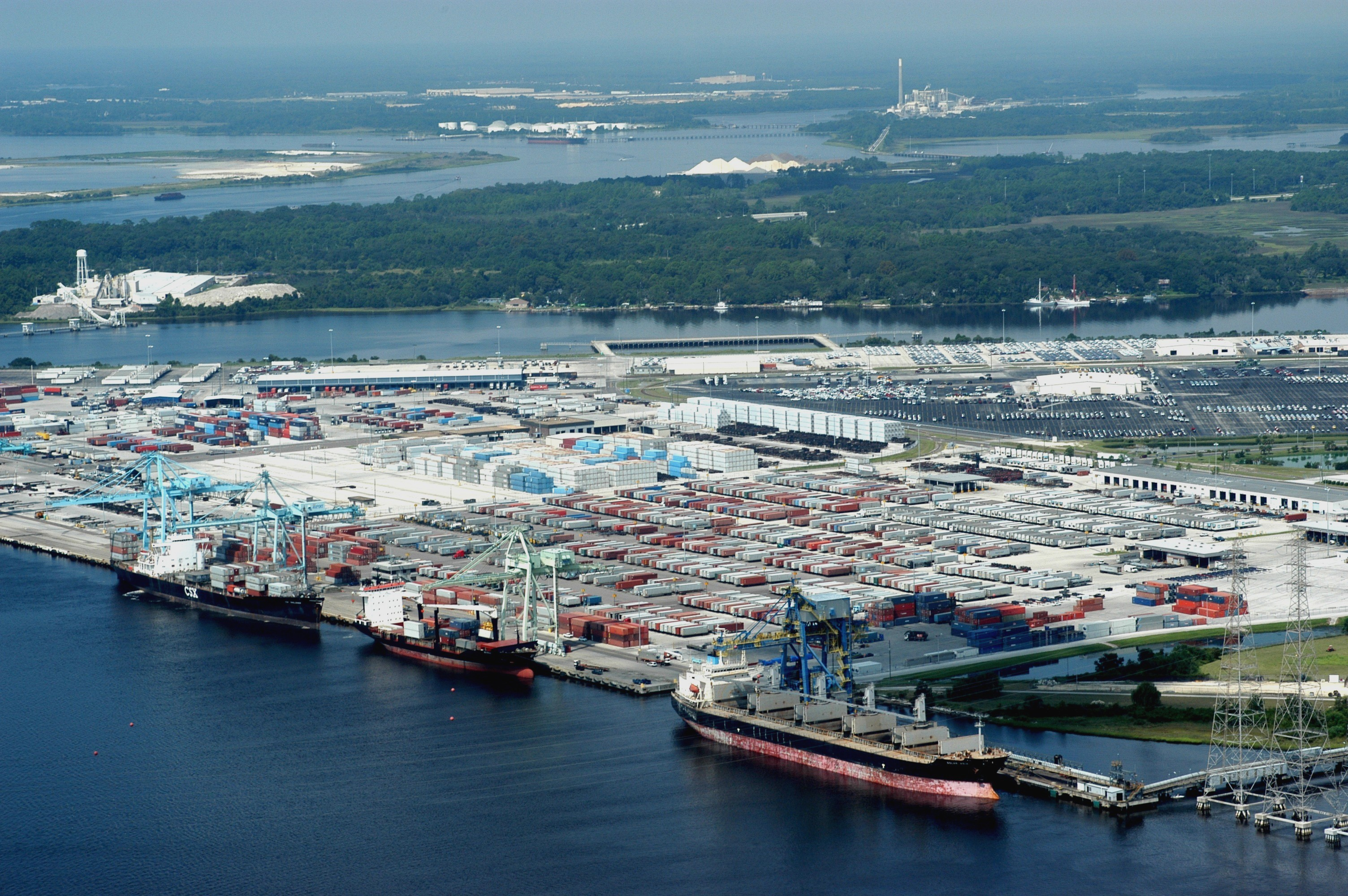
- The port of Jacksonville

- Location in USA

Location
- Country: United States
- Location: Jacksonville, Florida
- Coordinates: 30°22′51″N 81°33′52″W
- UN/LOCODE: USJAX

Details
- Operated by: Jacksonville Port Authority
- Type of harbour: river natural
- No. of berths: 13
- Draft depth: max 47 feet
- Air draft: 175 feet (for terminals located upstream of the Dames Point Bridge)

Statistics
- Vessel arrivals: 1,567
- Annual cargo tonnage: 10,032,869
- Passenger traffic: 90,241
- Annual revenue: $61.2 million
- Website; *Official website

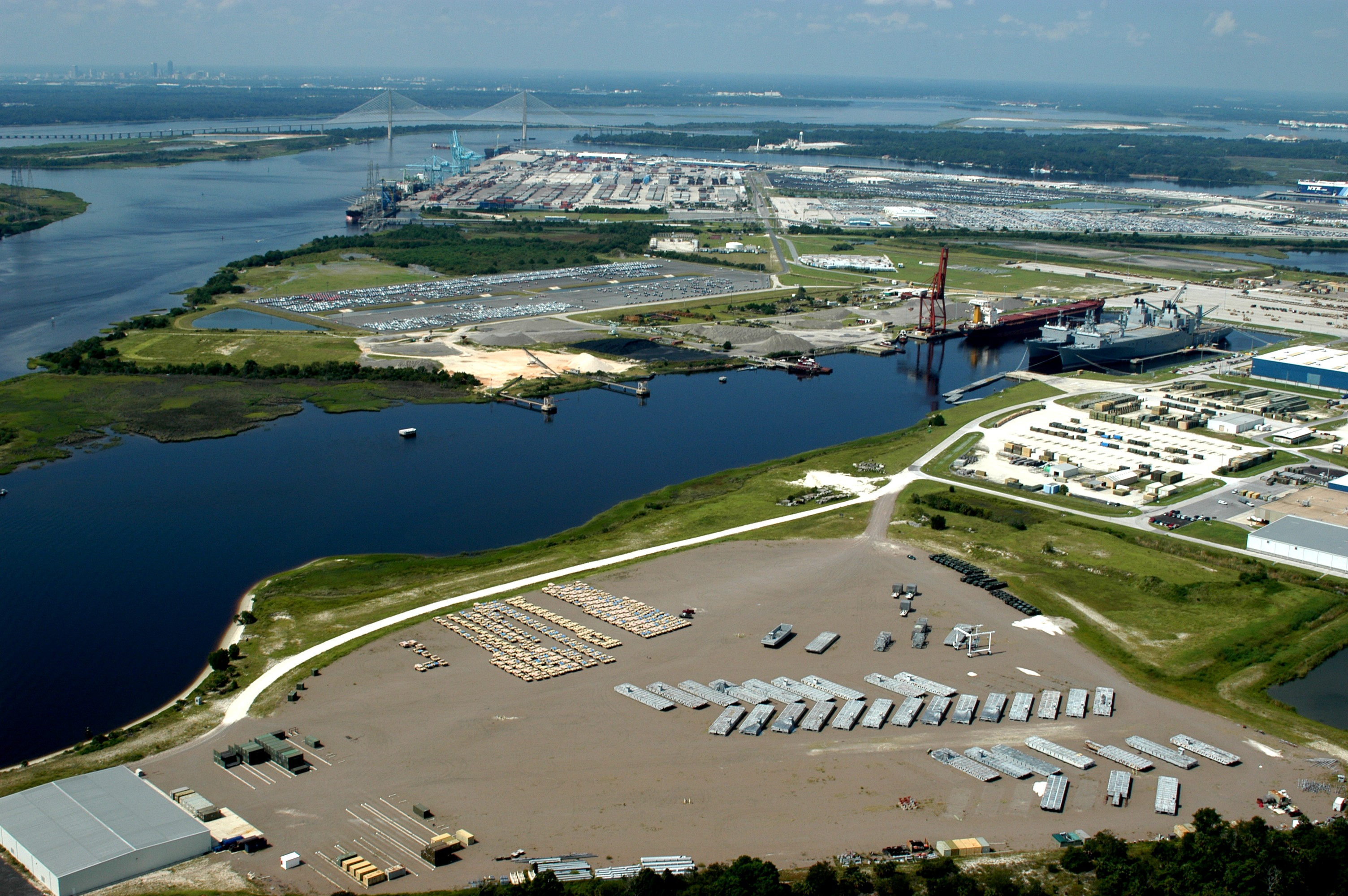
Port of Jacksonville

The Port of Jacksonville (JAXPORT) is an international trade port on the St. Johns River in Jacksonville, Florida. JAXPORT is the largest port by volume in Florida, and the 14th largest container port in the United States. It carries about 18 million short tons of cargo each year and has an annual economic impact of over $31 billion, including 138,500 jobs across the state of Florida related to cargo moving through the port. It handled 1,338,000 containers, and is the second largest handler of vehicles in the United States with 696,500 in 2019.

== History ==
English sailors traded ammunition and guns to the French from Fort Caroline for food and a boat in 1565, the first international commerce recorded in the New World. Because of this, the port uses the phrase, Jacksonville: America's First Port. After Cowford was renamed Jacksonville, a petition dated June 15, 1822, was sent to Secretary of State John Quincy Adams, asking him to designate the city as a port of entry for the United States.

Jacksonville's St. Johns River is one of the best natural seaports in the Southeast, and shipping has always been an important component of the local economy. Before Florida became a state in 1845, cotton and timber were traded and shipped at the port. The Great Fire of 1901 destroyed the port facilities as well as most of the city. Docks and wharfs were among the first items rebuilt by businesses. In 1907, the federal government helped pay for main channel in the river to be dredged to a depth of 24 feet (7.3 m). The city of Jacksonville began to exert control over the 160-acre (0.65 km^{2}) port at Talleyrand in 1912 and a $1.5 million bond referendum passed in 1913 to pay for construction of municipal docking facilities. The U.S. Army Corps of Engineers performed the harbor dredging in 1916, 1952, 1978 and 2003, when the channel was deepened to 30 feet (9.1 m), 34 feet (10 m), 38 feet (12 m) and 41 feet (12 m), respectively.

The United States Navy had no base at the Port of Jacksonville until shortly before World War II when two facilities were constructed. Today, the Naval Station Mayport, Naval Air Station Jacksonville, Blount Island Command (Marines) and nearby Naval Submarine Base Kings Bay form the third largest military presence in the United States.

Following the war, little or no money was spent on the public docks at the port, and they deteriorated until many were unusable. Because of this, Jacksonville missed out on much of the shipping boom of the Post-World War II economic expansion.

In addition to the military bases at the port, more than 20 maritime facilities in Jacksonville's harbor are privately owned and operated, including drydocks and petroleum terminals.

== Port Authority ==
The Jacksonville Port Authority (JPA) was created in 1963 by a special act of the Florida Legislature. The authority, also known as "Jaxport"', is the independent government agency that owns, operates and controls much of Jacksonville’s Seaport System, including (but not limited to) the following: docks and wharfs, cranes, a passenger cruise terminal, warehouses, paved open storage areas, and road connections to the public highway system. Jaxport maintains these facilities and manages their overall use. Private companies pay lease and rental fees to Jaxport in order to operate from the seaport. This revenue funds the day-to-day operations so that public tax dollars are not required. Jaxport does not operate or manage private boat marinas, water taxis or bridges.

The port has always taken security seriously; after the September 11 attacks, thwarting terrorism became the focus. Security guards are on constant patrol, supported by the Seaport Security Unit, made up of 11 officers and 2 sergeants on contract from the Jacksonville Sheriff's Office. Department of Homeland Security also has a presence with United States Customs Service and United States Border Patrol agents. The port has three areas of activity: cargo, cruises and ferry service.

== Cargo ==
Port of Jacksonville terminal locations
1 Blount Island
2 Talleyrand Marine Terminal
3 Dames Point Marine Terminal
4 Jaxport Cruise Terminal

The port has three separate cargo facilities: Blount Island, Talleyrand and Dames Point.

=== Blount Island ===
Blount Island lies 9 nautical miles (17 km) from the Atlantic Ocean and is one of the largest vehicle import/export centers in the United States. The United States Marine Corps uses 1,100 acres (4.5 km^{2}) on the east side of the island for its Maritime Prepositioning Force operations, and the public Blount Island Marine Terminal, which is Jaxport's largest container facility, occupies 754 acres (3.05 km^{2}) on the west half of the island. Blount Island can also process Ro/Ro, heavy lift, breakbulk and liquid bulk cargoes on 6,600 feet (2,000 m) of deep water (41 feet (12 m)) berths.

=== Talleyrand ===
The oldest marine facility at Jaxport is the Talleyrand Marine Terminal, located 21 nautical miles (39 km) from the Atlantic. The 173-acre (0.70 km^{2}) facility handles automobiles (import), liquid bulk commodities, break bulk cargo and containerized cargo. With six container cranes, on-dock rail service and a 160,000 sq ft (15,000 m^{2}) transit shed, the terminal can process frozen, refrigerated or ambient cargo on 4,780 feet (1,460 m) of deepwater (38 feet (12 m)) berthing space. A warehouse of 500,000 square feet (46,000 m^{2}) is available to store many types of cargoes.

=== Dames Point ===
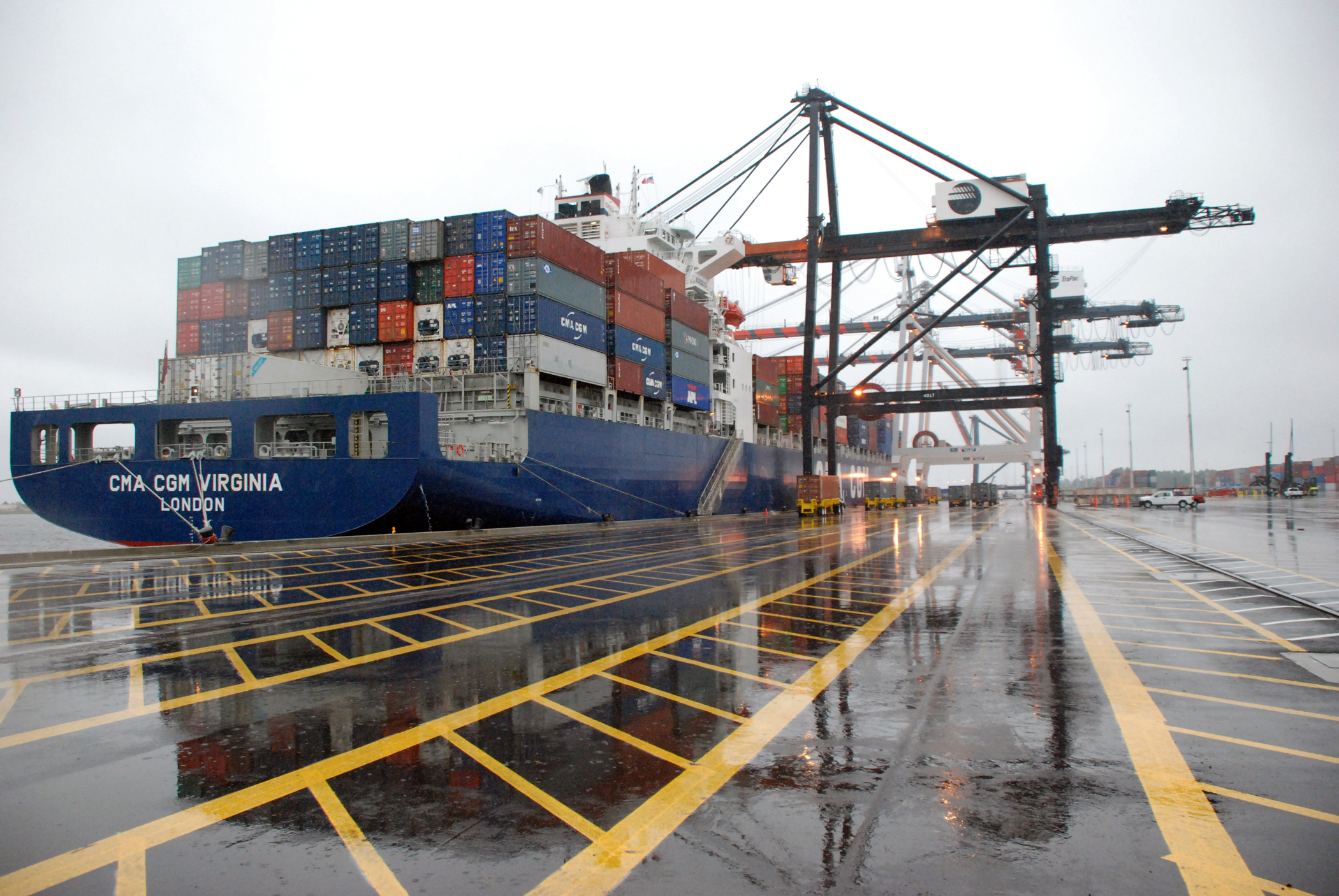
The CMA CGM Virginia at TraPac Container Terminal Dames Point Marine Terminal

The newest marine facility at Jaxport is the nearly 600-acre (2.4 km^{2}) Dames Point Marine Terminal. Situated one mile (1.6 km) upstream from Blount Island on the main shipping channel and just west of the Dames Point Bridge, this terminal presently has only one tenant: the 158-acre (0.64 km^{2}) TraPac Container Terminal used by Mitsui O.S.K. Lines. Space is available to store bulk aggregate material. Hanjin Shipping has reserved 90 acres (360,000 m^{2}) for their container terminal, which is projected to open during 2013.

The Jaxport "temporary" cruise facility is located at the northwest corner of Dames Point. There is a plan to remove this structure and construct a permanent facility elsewhere when economic conditions improve.

== Cruises ==
A "temporary" Jaxport Cruise Terminal was constructed in six months during 2003 near the Dames Point Bridge. The cruise facility contains 63,000 sq ft (5,900 m^{2}); the baggage handling area is 28,000 sq ft (2,600 m^{2}); and a passenger embarkation section has 15,000 sq ft (1,400 m^{2}). Vehicle access to the site is via Hecksher Drive and there is paved parking for over 800 cars.

Celebrity Cruises began regular service from Jacksonville on October 27, 2003 on the MV Zenith. Celebrity discontinued their service from Jacksonville when the Zenith was retired from their fleet in 2007.

The ship Carnival Miracle was christened at the Port of Jacksonville on February 27, 2004, beginning Jacksonville service by Carnival Cruise Lines. The Carnival Miracle was replaced by Carnival Cruise Lines' Jubilee, which sailed between Jaxport and The Bahamas from May 2004 through August 2004. Carnival established year-round cruise service from Jacksonville aboard the Celebration on October 12, 2004. The Celebration continued to sail between Jaxport and The Bahamas through April 2008. After a four-month hiatus in service, Carnival restarted Jacksonville-Bahamas cruise service aboard the Carnival Fascination, which provided service from Jacksonville until April 2016, being replaced with Carnival Elation. As of 2019, cruises from Jacksonville visit the Bahamas and Eastern Caribbean onboard the Carnival Ecstasy.

During the COVID-19 pandemic all cruises were suspended. The first post-pandemic cruise was the American Queen Voyages ship, Ocean Voyager which departed February 21, 2022 for a 12-day cruise to destinations along the Atlantic coast. The Carnival Spirit departed on March 7, 2022 for a 5-day Bahamas trip.

== Ferry service ==
The Saint Johns River Ferry (also known as the Mayport Ferry) crosses the St. Johns River, connecting Mayport to Fort George Island. The 0.9-mile (1.4 km) crossing is part of State Road A1A and departs every half-hour. The ferry has been operating since 1948 and is the last active ferry in Florida.

The Florida Department of Transportation, which had always operated the service, had the Mayport Ferry line item budget vetoed by Governor Charlie Crist for 2007-2008. Rather than terminate the service, the City of Jacksonville assumed responsibility, but lost over $1 million in one year. Mayor John Peyton announced that there was no money available in the next budget. The Jacksonville Port Authority took over operation of the ferry in 2007 and raised the standard fare from $3.25 to $5.00, but still lost half a million dollars each year. However, they use port revenue, not tax money, to underwrite the operation. After taking over, the JPA decided to cut costs and sell the Blackbeard, the backup vessel built in 1956. That meant that whenever the Jean Ribault had problems, ferry service would be suspended. On February 5, 2009 the ferry was put into dry dock for routine maintenance, but hull corrosion required an extra week of repairs, and there was no service for a month.

== See also ==
- United States container ports
- Jacksonville Port Authority
