= Stephen Payne (naval architect) =

British naval architect

Stephen M. Payne OBE MNM RDI FREng FRINA HonFIED
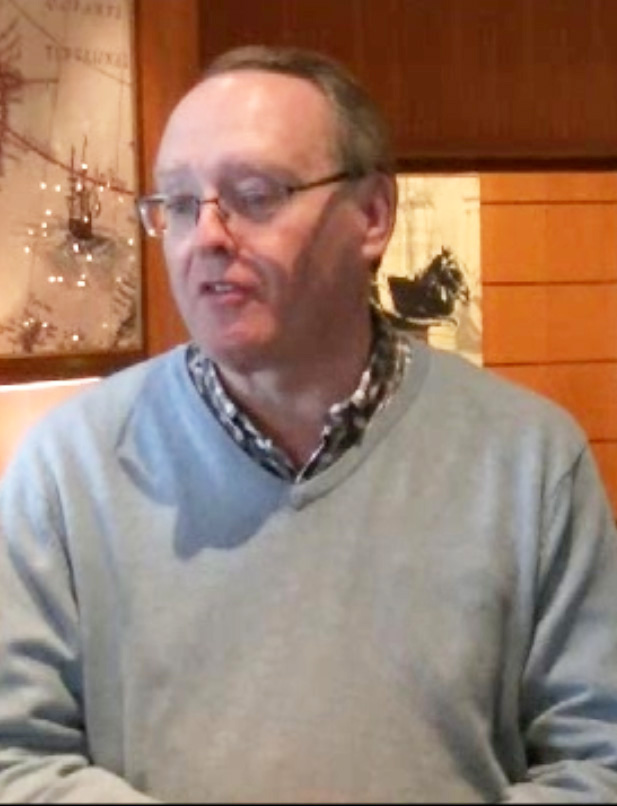
- Stephen Payne during a speaker's discussion session on board Queen Mary 2 in December 2017.
- Born: Stephen Michael Payne c. 1960 (age 65–66); London, England
- Citizenship: United Kingdom
- Engineering career
- Discipline: Ship Science
- Practice name: PFJ Maritime Consulting (2011-2016)
- Employer: Carnival Corporate Shipbuilding (1985-2010)
- Projects: Rotterdam
- Significant design: Queen Mary 2
- Significant advance: podded propulsion
- Awards: Most Excellent Order of the British Empire, Royal Designer for Industry, VADM Land Medal

Stephen Michael Payne' is a British naval architect. He has worked on the designs of approximately 40 passenger ships for the Carnival Corporation, including the Queen Mary 2. He is an independent maritime consultant and is an educational advocate for engineering careers.

== Background and education ==
Stephen Michael Payne was born in London, England circa 1960. He was educated in the local council schools including Catford Boys School, where two of its teachers would have a key role in shaping his career. His interest in ocean liners began at age five when the BBC children's television program Blue Peter featured a tour of the RMS Queen Elizabeth. He would later state that he was immediately captivated by the ship. His interest in ships intensified during a 1969 family visit to the then new Queen Elizabeth 2 in Southampton where he also observed the SS United States, on one of her last transatlantic crossings, arriving in port. In 1972 the program's magazine described the destruction by fire of the Queen Elizabeth in Hong Kong Harbour and ended with the statement “…nothing like her will ever be built again.” With encouragement from a Catford English teacher Payne wrote a letter of complaint to the program arguing that they were wrong, another ship to rival her would indeed be built and he would design it. The program applauded his ambition but cautioned him not to be discouraged if it never happened.

When the time came for him to consider university studies however his career counselors discouraged Payne from any engineering career as it was then seen as having limited job prospects. They advised him to instead study chemistry and he enrolled at Imperial College London. After one year of study he met with his former physics teacher from Catford who agreed that Payne had been badly advised, and helped him obtain funding to transfer to the University of Southampton's Ship Science program. While there, he also enrolled in the University Royal Naval Unit (URNU) to experience how ships responded at sea. After graduating in 1984 with a B.Sc.(Hons) in ship science, he accepted a position at Marconi Radar. His role was to advise the company on aspects of ship motion and ship design.

== Professional career ==
Payne began his work with Carnival Corporation in January 1985 when employed by Technical Marine Planning, then a London-based consultancy firm under contract with Carnival for the design and construction supervision of its new ships. (By 1995 the firm was absorbed into Carnival and became its newbuild department.)

His first assignment was to assess stability of the MS Holiday. He next became a member of the design team for the Carnival Fantasy-class ships which entered service starting in 1990. The last two Fantasy ships, Elation and Paradise, were equipped with ABB Azipod thrusters rather than traditional shaft drives, a development which influenced his later work. By 1995 he was a Senior Naval Architect and oversaw the construction of the first Destiny-class ship. His next major project was the design of Holland America Line's new flagship Rotterdam VI where he was project manager. Payne designed the new ship with twin funnels, a tribute to the 1959 Rotterdam V. Following completion of the Rotterdam, Payne was project manager for the Costa Atlantica and the Spirit-class ships.

In May 1998 Carnival acquired Cunard, and Payne was given charge of designing the new ocean liner Queen Mary 2 (QM2) to replace the Queen Elizabeth 2 as Cunard's transatlantic liner. Payne's design was heavily influenced by past Atlantic liners. "I have this philosophy that to get things right the first-time, you need to have an appreciation for history - of what has been done before." QM2 has a breakwater adopted from the Normandie and split engine rooms to avoid having a single point of failure. "The bridge, the mast, and the funnel are all loosely based on the Queen Elizabeth 2 and I felt it particularly important to echo some of the similarities between that ship and this one to create the lineage progression."

On three occasions Carnival's board halted the project as they did not consider it commercially viable. Payne refined the design and instituted several innovations to justify the new liner's construction cost. He placed the new ship's public spaces near the water line. This allowed for premium fare balcony (rather than porthole) cabins to be placed in the hull yet high enough to have a margin of protection from the sea conditions of the north Atlantic. Payne also created more revenue-producing interior space by removing one engine room from the initial design and instead using gas turbines at the base of the funnel. Podded propulsion, rather than shaft drives, was used to free up even more interior space and offered greater fuel efficiency and maneuverability. Spectacular public rooms, restricted to only first class passengers on the great twentieth century liners, were open to all passengers. QM2 was delivered to Cunard in December 2003, on time and under budget.

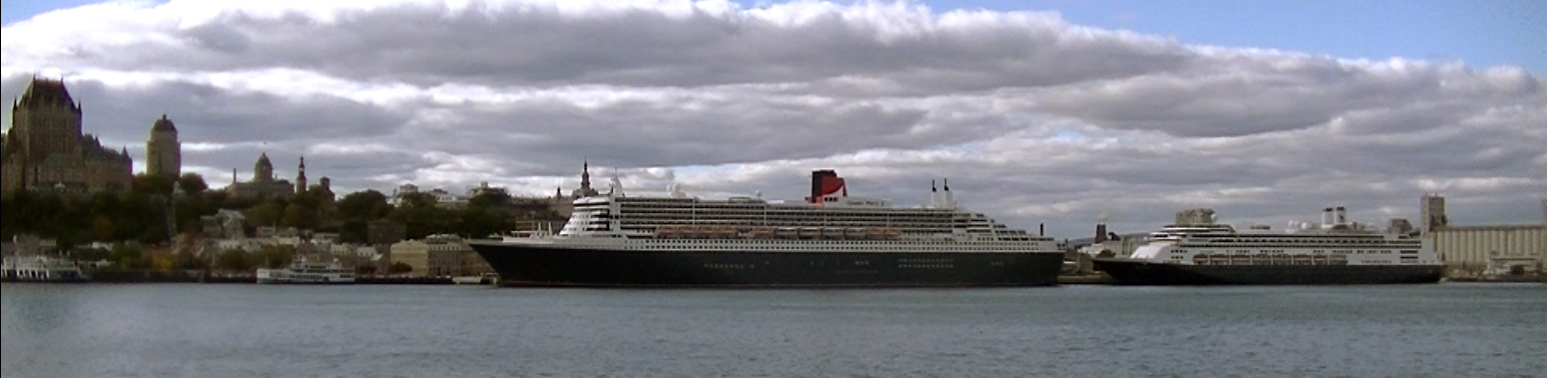
Payne-designed ships Queen Mary 2 and Rotterdam VI berthed in Quebec City in September 2017

During the design phase of Queen Mary 2 Payne was appointed a member of a safety innovation group for the UK Maritime & Coastguard Agency. His next major project was to lead the design team for the Seabourn Cruise Line Odyssey-class ships which entered service starting in 2009. Carnival's later newbuild contracts would stipulate podded propulsion as they offered fuel savings and superior maneuverability compared to traditional shaft drives. Payne would later state, "I have yet to meet a ship's master who is familiar with pods that doesn't prefer them to shafts, rudders and stern thrusters."

In 2010, Payne left Carnival and became a founding member of the consultancy PFJ-Maritime Consulting Ltd. As a maritime consultant Payne has been involved in shipping law, passenger vessel safety, future developments for shipping propulsion, He is also an industry consultant for the emergence of Asian shipyards for ship building and refurbishment. Payne also consulted with the Ministry of Defence during the development of the Queen Elizabeth-class aircraft carriers.

In 2021 Payne revealed the design of a new flagship to replace the royal yacht HMY Britannia, which was decommissioned in 1997. When not in use by the royal family it would host diplomatic events and promote British trade. In November 2022 the Government of the United Kingdom terminated the project.

== Engineering advocacy ==
As a result of the media attention given to Queen Mary 2 and his role as lead designer, Payne received correspondence from students who asked about engineering careers. They were encountering many of the same biases as he himself had received thirty years earlier: that it was a profession in decline and without a promising future. To help address this persistent attitude, Payne and some colleagues founded the Future Engineers initiative. The program featured a specific engineering project and allowed students and their teachers visit the site and interact with the designers and engineers.

Payne also served as a governor of the Quilley School prior to its merger with Crestwood College. In 2003 he was invited to deliver the MacMillan Memorial Lecture to the Institution of Engineers and Shipbuilders in Scotland. He chose the subject "Genesis of a Queen". He was a member of the Board of Trustees of the Webb Institute (Glen Cove, New York) from 2011 to 2020. Between 2012 and 2016 Payne was President of The National STEM Skills Passport.

In June 2021 Payne announced his support for the construction of a new National Flagship. Writing for an industry publication, Payne argued that with the retirement of Britannia, "the UK lost a highly effective ambassador for trade promotion and State diplomacy." A new yacht with British design, equipment and innovation "would be an international showcase for all things British Maritime." Payne however criticized the design released by Prime Minister Boris Johnson's office as "...akin to a 1950s Hull trawler" and "...not such a good idea for a global voyager crossing the Atlantic, Pacific, or even rounding the tip of Africa."

== Awards and honours ==
In 2004, Payne was awarded the Civil Order of the British Empire (OBE) by Queen Elizabeth II for his service to the shipping industry. He also received professional and academic awards:

- 2003, given a Gold Blue Peter badge for building the Queen Mary 2 thirty-two years after he complained to Blue Peter for saying that "nothing like her will ever be built again"
- 2006, granted a Special Achievement Award from the Royal Academy of Engineering
- 2006, elected a Royal Designer for Industry for engineering design.
- 2006, received an honorary Merchant Navy Medal for services to cruise liner design (MNM).
- 2007, he received an Honorary Doctorate of Science from the University of Southampton.
- 2007–2010, he served as President of the Royal Institution of Naval Architects (FRINA).
- 2008, elected a Fellow of the Royal Academy of Engineering (FREng).
- 2009, elected an Honorary Fellow of the Institution of Engineering Designers (HonFIED).
- 2010–2014, served as a Trustee of the Southampton Cultural Development Trust.
- 2011, the Society of Naval Architects and Marine Engineers awarded him the Vice Admiral Emory S. "Jerry" Land Medal (VADM) for Outstanding Accomplishment in the Marine Field.
- 2015, awarded an Honorary Doctor of Science degree from the University of Winchester.

Payne is a Chartered Engineer (CEng) and a Freeman of the City of London.^{[Permanent Dead Link]}

== Bibliography ==
- Grande Dame: Holland America Line and the S.S. Rotterdam ISBN 978-0903055123 (1990)
- MS Statendam: Continuing "A Tradition of Excellence" ASIN B000OLKCLC (1992)
- RMS Queen Mary 2 Manual: An insight into the design, construction and operation of the world's largest ocean liner ISBN 978-0857332448 (2014)
- RMS Queen Elizabeth 2 (1967-2008): Owners' workshop manual ISBN 978-0857332165 (2017)

Forewords to:

- The Liner - Retrospective & Renaissance ISBN 978-1844860494 (2005)
- Cunarder - Maritime Paintings ISBN 978-0954366643 (2005)
- The Grand Fleet 1914-19: the Royal Navy in the First World War ISBN 978-0750952002 (2013)
- 175 Years of Cunard ISBN 978-0752489261 (2015)
- Ocean Liners - An Illustrated History ISBN 978-1526723161 (2018)
