= Carnival Paradise =

Cruise ship built in 1998

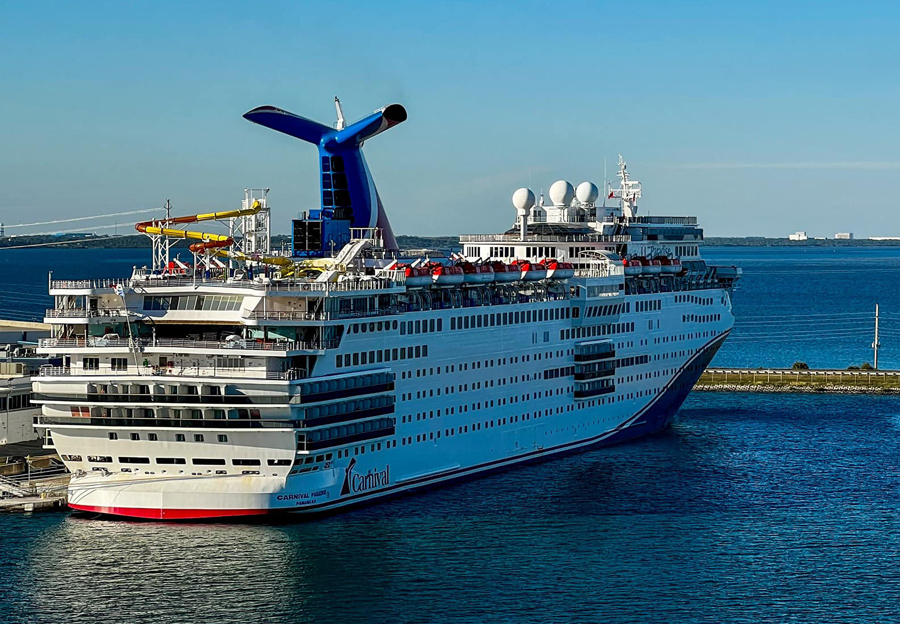
- Carnival Paradise in October 2021, wearing Carnival's new livery

History

Panama
- Name: Paradise (1998–2007); Carnival Paradise (2007–present)
- Owner: Carnival Corporation
- Operator: Carnival Cruise Line
- Port of registry: Panama City, Panama
- Builder: Kvaerner Masa-Yards; Helsinki New Shipyard; Helsinki, Finland
- Cost: $300 million
- Yard number: 494
- Laid down: 1996
- Launched: 29 January 1998
- Sponsored by: Paula Zahn
- Christened: 1998
- Completed: 1998
- Acquired: 29 October 1998
- Maiden voyage: November 1998
- In service: 1998–present
- Refit: 2018 2023
- Identification: Call sign: 3FOB5; IMO number: 9120877; MMSI number: 355833000
- Status: in active service

General characteristics (as built)
- Class & type: Fantasy-class cruise ship
- Tonnage: 70,367 GT; 6,894 DWT
- Length: 260.60 m (855 ft 0 in)
- Beam: 31.50 m (103 ft 4 in)
- Height: 115 ft 6 in (35.20 m)
- Draft: 7.80 m (25 ft 7 in)
- Decks: 13 (10 with passenger access)
- Installed power: 6 × Wärtsilä W12V38A; 47,520 kW (combined)
- Propulsion: Two ABB Azipod propulsion units
- Speed: 21 knots (39 km/h; 24 mph) (service); 22 knots (41 km/h; 25 mph) (maximum)
- Capacity: 2,040 passengers
- Crew: 920

General characteristics (after 2018 refit)
- Tonnage: 71,925 GT
- Decks: 14 (11 with passenger access)
- Capacity: 2,124

Carnival Paradise (formerly Paradise) is a Fantasy-class cruise ship operated by Carnival Cruise Line. Built by Kværner Masa-Yards at its Helsinki New Shipyard in Helsinki, Finland, she was floated out on 29 January 1998, and christened as Paradise by Paula Zahn. During 2007, in common with all of her Fantasy-class sisters, she had the prefix Carnival added to her name.

== History ==
Carnival Paradise was built to be the world's first completely non-smoking cruise ship and she was entered into service supported by several anti-smoking and cancer-prevention groups. "No smoking" signs were placed prominently on both sides of the ship and on the stern under the name.

Non-smoking rules were strictly enforced. No smoking materials of any kind were permitted aboard. If anything was seen or found, the passenger was fined $250 and put off at the next port, with their transportation home under the passenger's own expense. Due to poor revenue, Carnival decided to discontinue the smoke-free policy in December 2003, claiming that non-smokers tend to not drink or gamble as much as those accustomed to smoke.

Scheduled to arrive at the Port of Long Beach, California, on 20 September 2004, her arrival was delayed due to several major hurricanes (see 2004 Atlantic hurricane season). Her cruise through the Caribbean and Panama Canal, and up the Mexican coast was further hindered by more hurricanes. After having skirted the bad weather with minimal inconvenience, Paradise arrived at the Long Beach cruise terminal in the early morning. Later that day, the non-smoking signs were painted over.

In 2021, she was repainted into Carnival's new livery.

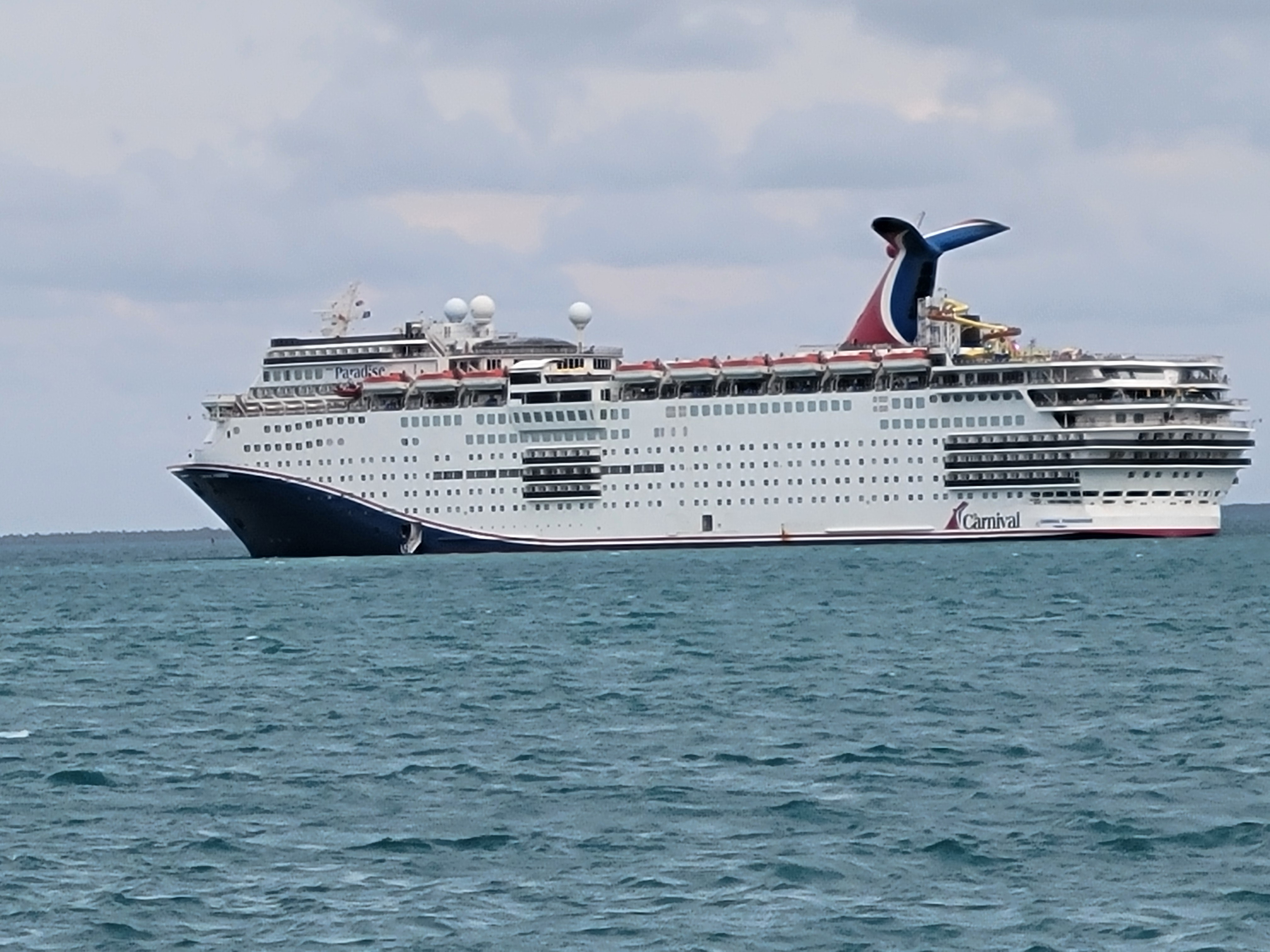
Carnival paradise seen from a approaching ferry that would later dock and let off passengers including me June 10th 2026 anchored off Belize

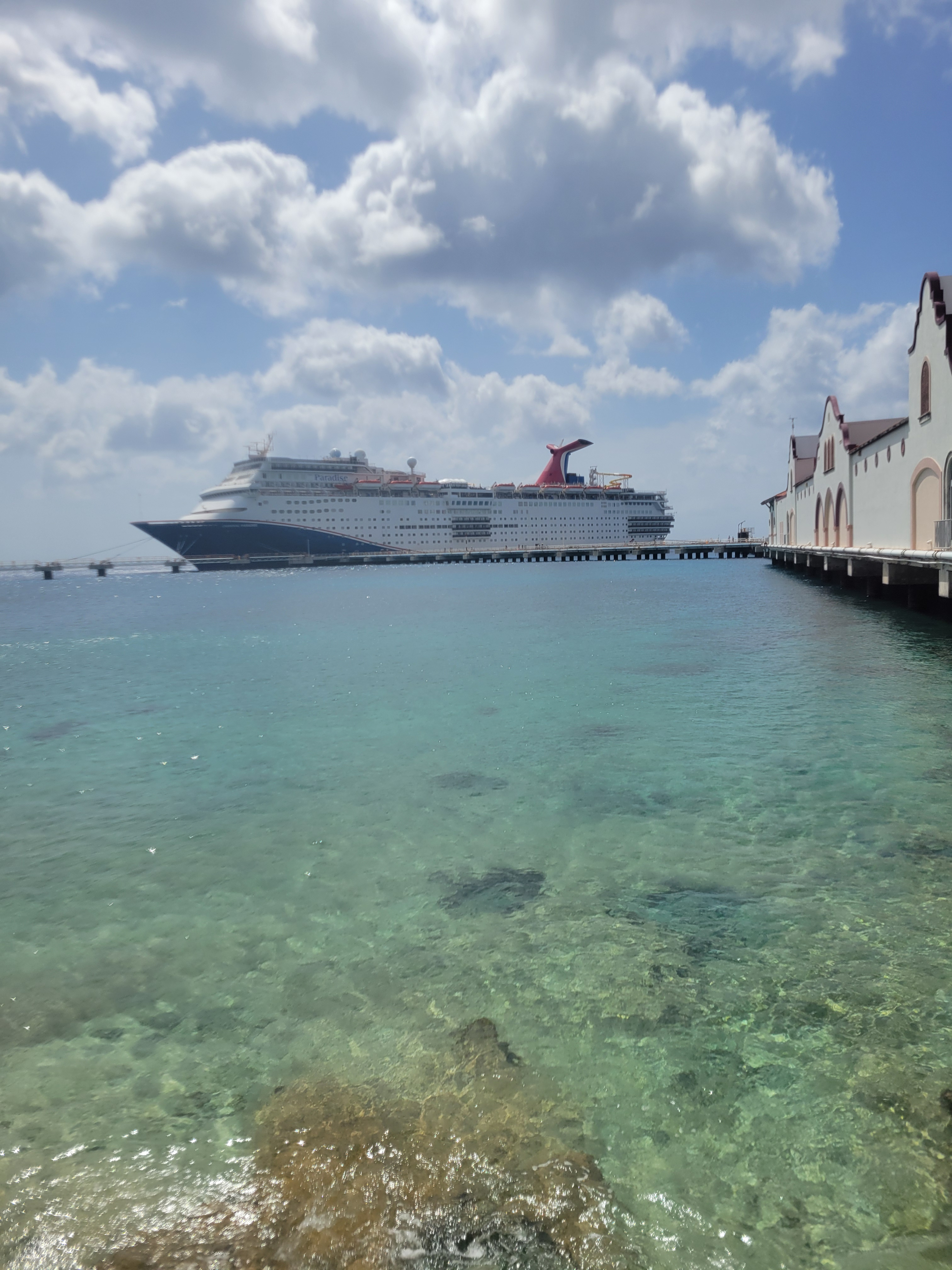
Carnival Paradise Docked in Cozumel June 12th 2026

== Service history ==
Starting in 1998 to 2004, Carnival Paradise sailed 7 Day cruises to the Caribbean from Miami.

In 2004 she repositioned to Long Beach, California. After her arrival in Long Beach, she undertook 3-day and 4-day cruises to Ensenada, Mexico and Santa Catalina Island, California.

In late 2011, Carnival moved Carnival Paradise to Tampa, replacing the Carnival Inspiration, which went to California. Currently, Carnival Paradise takes 4 and 5 night voyages to the Western Caribbean and Bahamas. The ship also used to sail to Havana, Cuba and Key West, Florida on select sailings from 2017 to 2019.

In 2018, she underwent a month-long dry dock in Freeport, Bahamas, which added a 14th deck to the front of the ship to accommodate 38 new cabins.

In 2023, Carnival Paradise underwent another refit during her October dry dock which added new spaces as well as upgrades to the vessel.

== Gallery ==
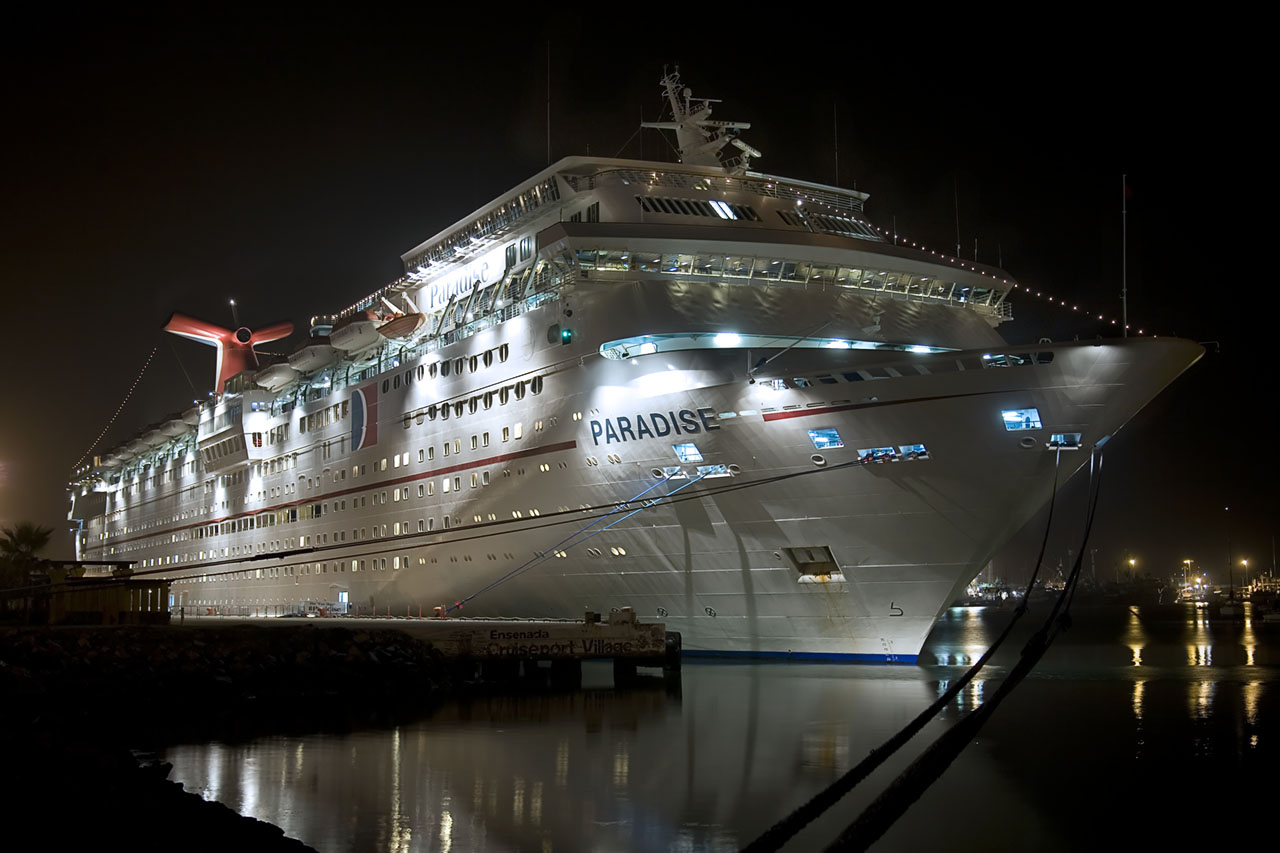
MS Paradise. Night at the Ensenada, Mexico port

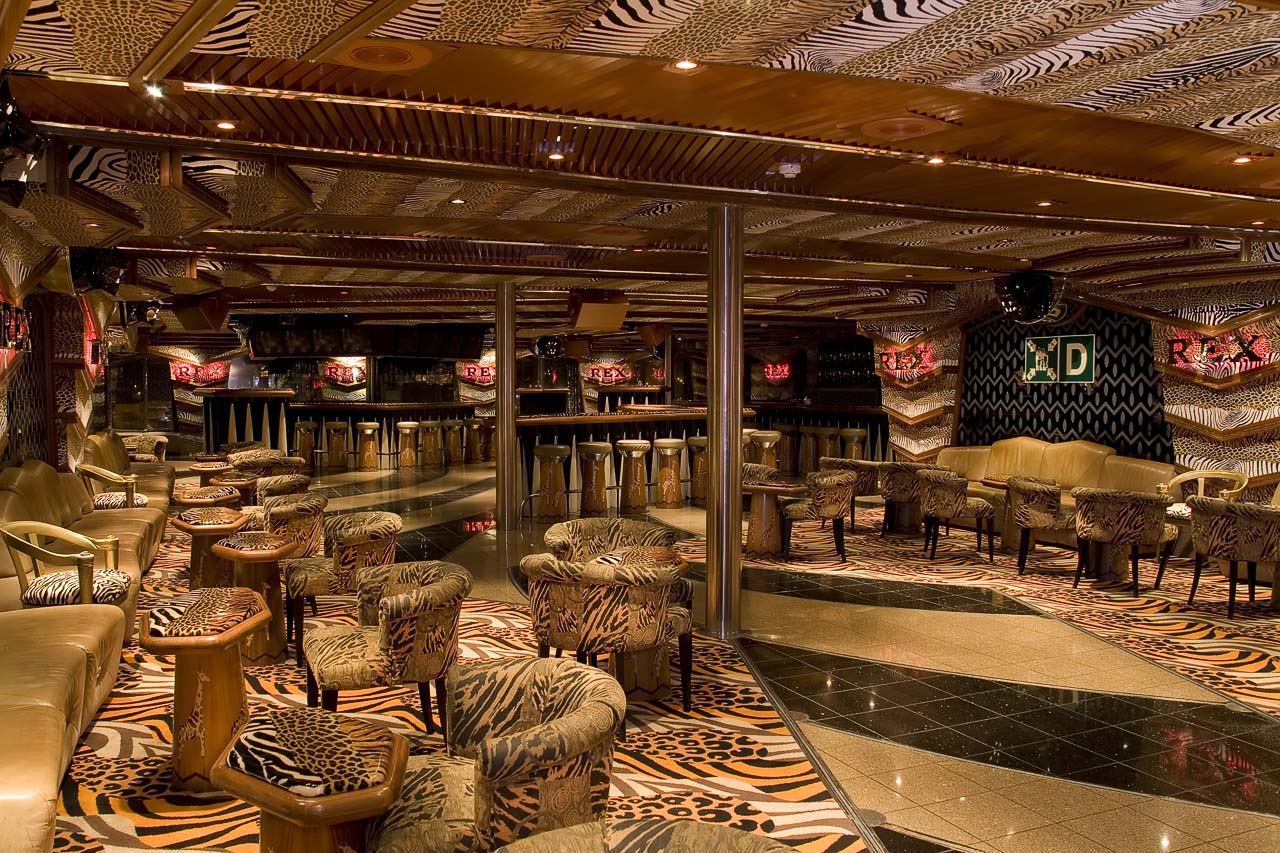
The 18 and older REX Dance Club

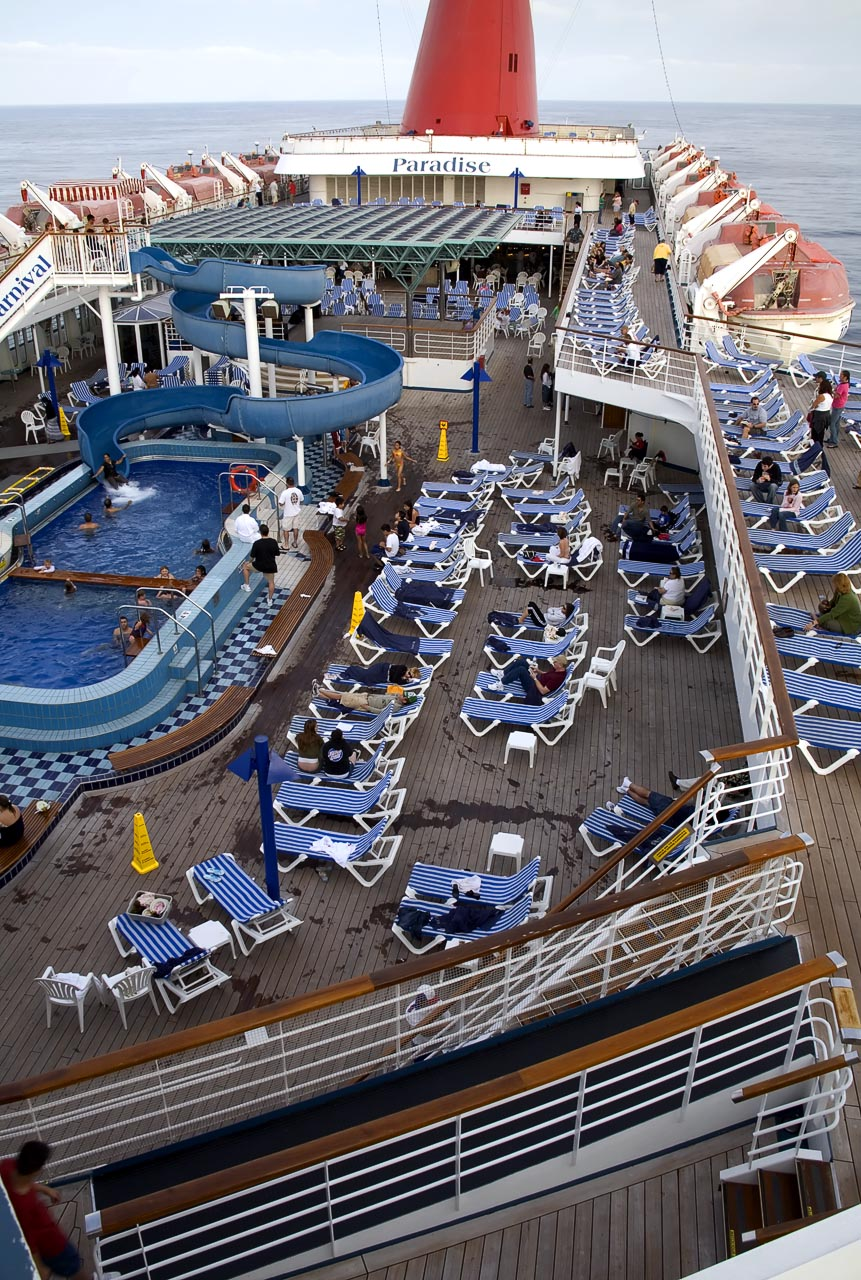
The pool area on the Lido Deck

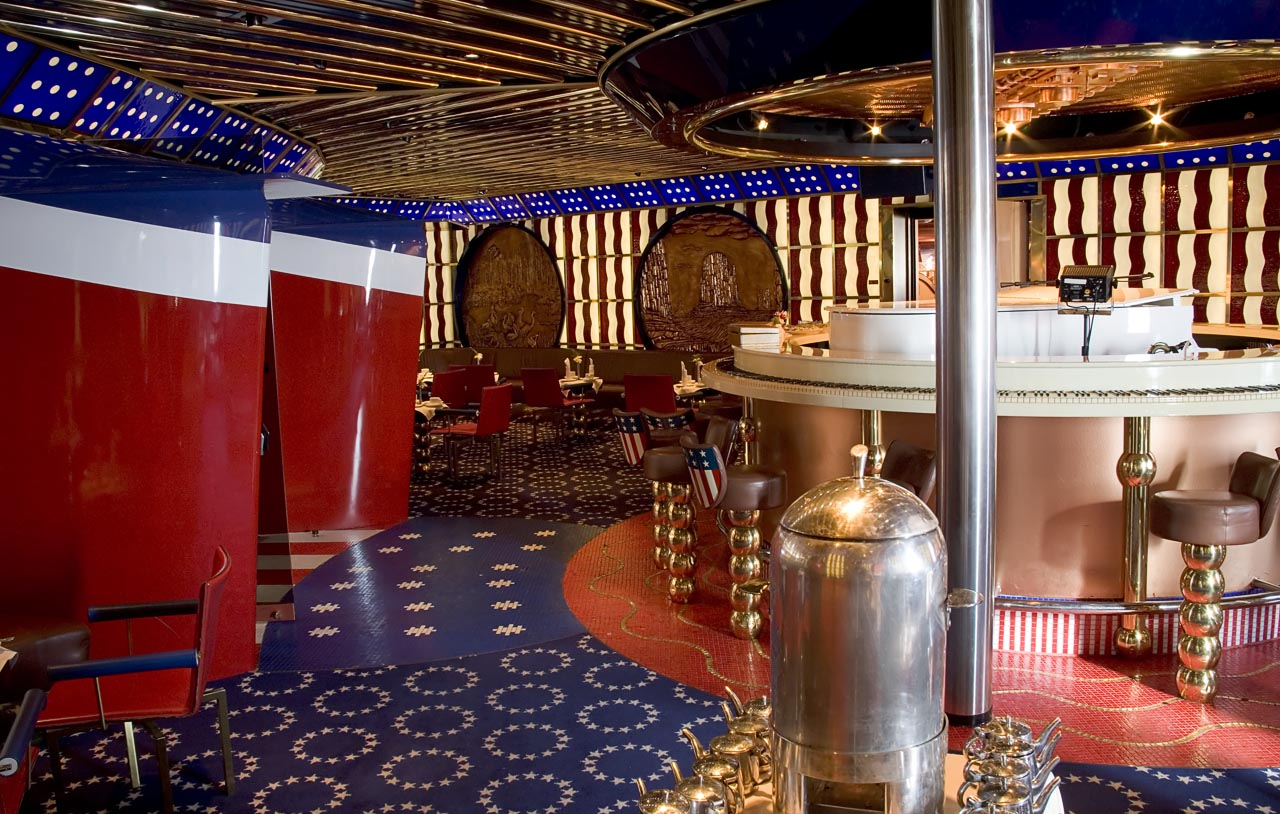
The America Bar, set for tea service

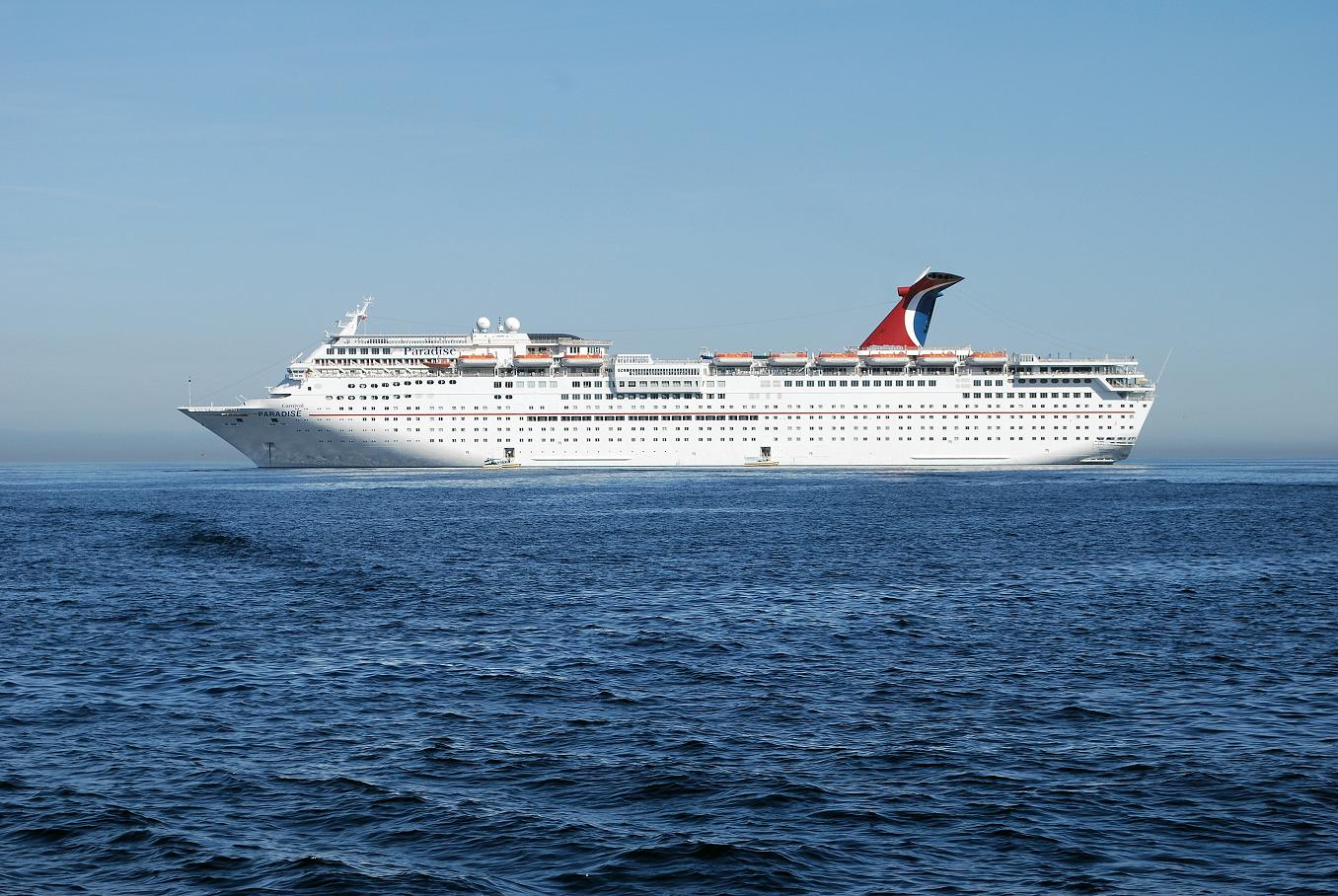
Paradise from Avalon, Catalina

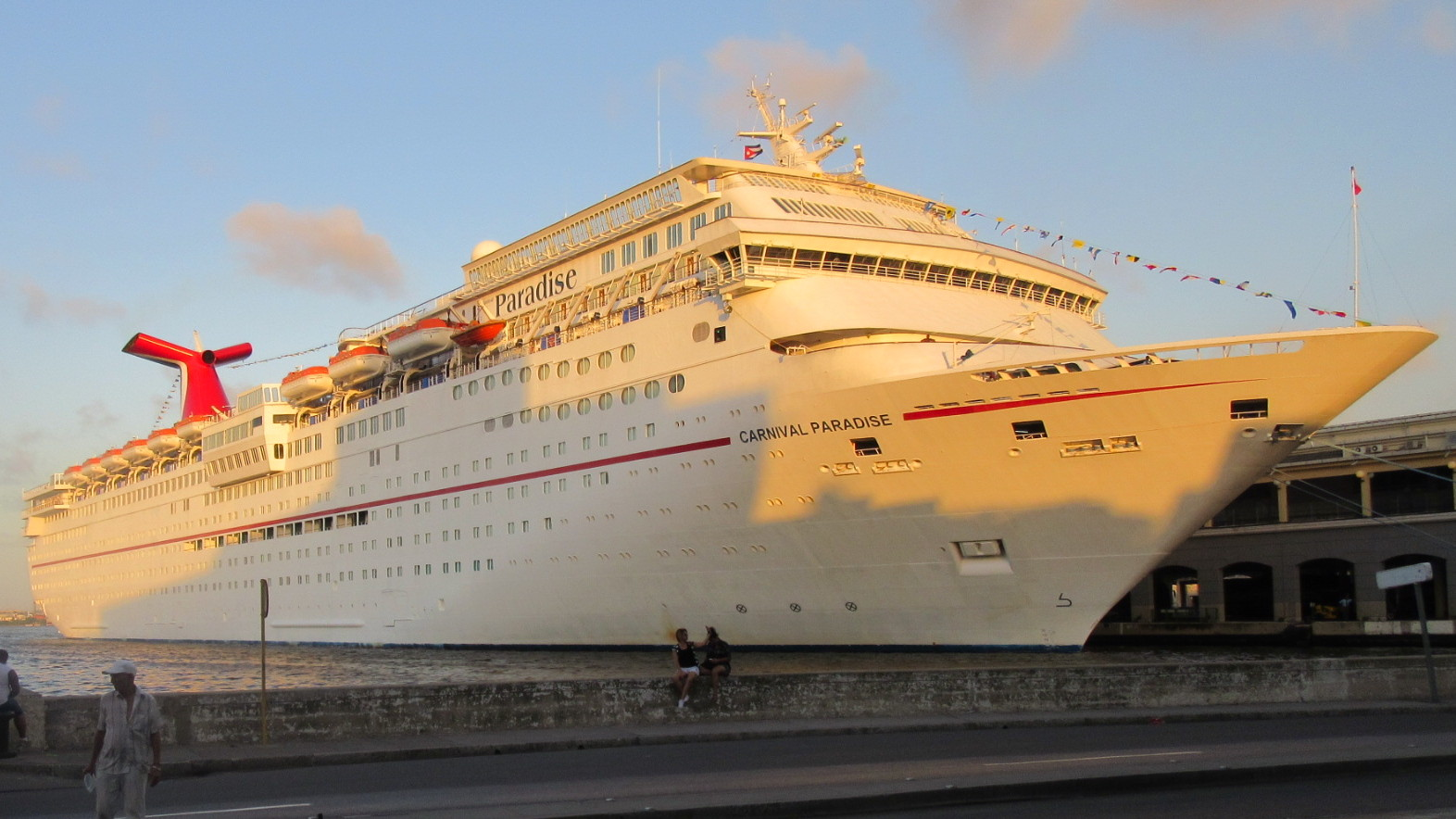
Carnival Paradise docked in Havana, Cuba

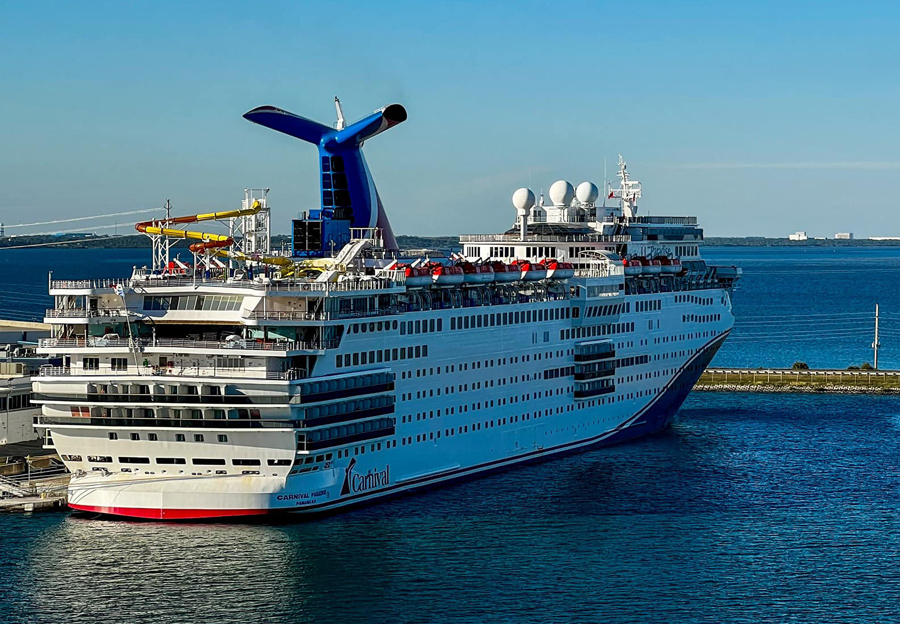
Carnival Paradise in Carnival Cruise Line's new livery, 2021
