= Carnival Ecstasy =

Cruise ship

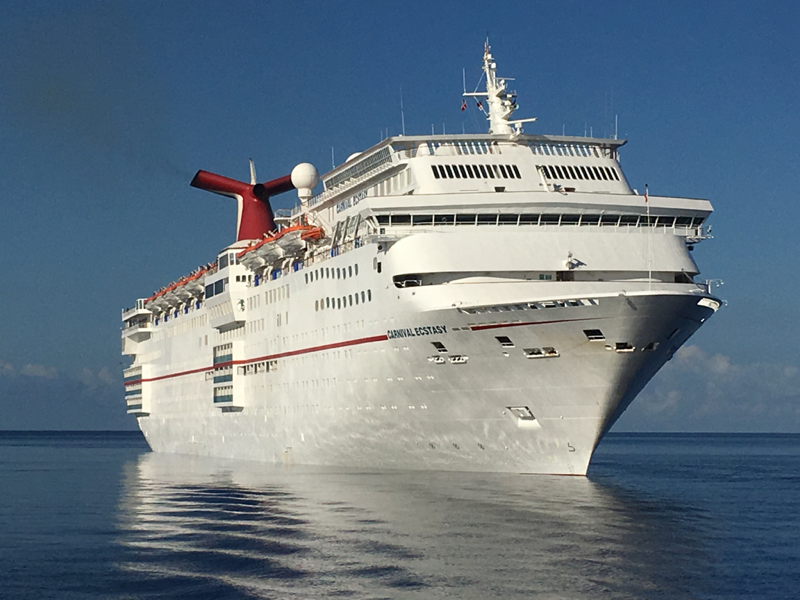
- Carnival Ecstasy anchored off Princess Cays in 2018.

History
- Name: Ecstasy (1991–2007); Carnival Ecstasy (2007–2022)
- Owner: Carnival Corporation & plc
- Operator: Carnival Cruise Lines (1991–2022)
- Port of registry: Panama City, Panama
- Builder: Kvaerner Masa-Yards; Helsinki New Shipyard; Helsinki, Finland
- Yard number: 480
- Launched: January 6, 1991
- Sponsored by: Kathie Lee Gifford
- Completed: 1991
- Maiden voyage: April 2, 1991
- In service: 1991–2022
- Out of service: October 15, 2022, Last Tracked at Port Of Mobile on October 10, 2022 (according to vesseltracker.com)
- Refit: 2009, 2014, January 2017, October 2019
- Identification: Call sign: H3GR; IMO number: 8711344; MMSI number: 353479000
- Fate: Sold for scrap in October 2022. Beached at Aliağa, Turkey on 8 November 2022.

General characteristics
- Class & type: Fantasy-class cruise ship
- Tonnage: 70,367 GT
- Length: 855 ft (261 m)
- Beam: 103 ft (31 m)
- Draft: 7.80 m (25 ft 7 in)
- Decks: 12
- Installed power: 2 × Sulzer-Wärtsilä 8ZAV40S; 4 × Sulzer-Wärtsilä 12ZAV40S; 42,240 kW (combined)
- Propulsion: Two propellers
- Speed: 21 knots (39 km/h; 24 mph)
- Capacity: 2,052 passengers (lower berths); 2,606 passengers (all berths)
- Crew: 920

Carnival Ecstasy (formerly Ecstasy) was a Fantasy-class cruise ship operated by Carnival Cruise Line. Built by Kværner Masa-Yards at its Helsinki New Shipyard in Helsinki, Finland, she was floated out on January 6, 1991, and christened by television hostess, entertainer and long time Carnival spokesperson Kathie Lee Gifford. Her inaugural voyage began on April 2, 1991. During 2007, in common with all of her Fantasy-class sisters, she had the prefix Carnival added to her name. With the departure of the Carnival Fantasy in 2020, the Carnival Ecstasy became the oldest ship in the fleet until her retirement in October 2022. She was replaced by Carnival Spirit out of Mobile, Alabama in October 2023.

Unlike her recently retired sister ships, Carnival Ecstasy offered a farewell cruise itinerary prior to her own retirement. Subsequently, the ship was beached for scrapping in Turkey on November 8, 2022.

== Areas of operation ==
Throughout her service Carnival Ecstasy has cruised from ports in the United States to Baja Mexico, the Bahamas and the Caribbean.

After Hurricane Katrina, the ship spent six months in New Orleans serving as quarters for evacuees and relief workers.

Starting in May 2019, the ship cruised from Jacksonville, FL's JAXPORT Cruise Terminal to visit the Bahamas and Eastern Caribbean.

In February 2022 Carnival announced that due to uncertain times in the Australian cruise industry, Spirit would re-home from Sydney to Jacksonville, Florida. Carnival Ecstasy would move from Jacksonville to Mobile, Alabama. Carnival Sensation, which was slated to head to Mobile has been delayed.

== Accidents and incidents ==
=== Fire ===
On the afternoon of July 20, 1998, Ecstasy departed the Port of Miami, Florida, en route to Key West, Florida, with 2,565 passengers and 916 crew members aboard. A fire started in the main laundry room and spread through the ventilation system to the aft mooring deck, where mooring lines ignited. As Ecstasy was attempting to reach an anchorage north of the Miami sea buoy, the vessel lost power and began to drift. The master then radioed the U.S. Coast Guard for assistance. Six tugboats responded to help fight the fire and tow Ecstasy. The fire was brought under control by onboard firefighters and was extinguished about 9:09 PM. Fourteen crew members and eight passengers suffered minor injuries. One passenger required medical treatment as a result of a pre-existing condition and was categorized as a serious injury victim because of the length of her hospital stay. Losses from the fire and associated damages exceeded $17 million.

The National Transportation Safety Board determined that the probable cause of fire aboard Ecstasy was the unauthorized welding by crew members in the main laundry that ignited a large accumulation of lint in the ventilation system and the failure of Carnival Cruise Lines to maintain the laundry exhaust ducts in a fire-safe condition. Contributing to the extensive fire damage on the ship was the lack of an automatic fire suppression system on the aft mooring deck and the lack of an automatic means of mitigating the spread of smoke and fire through the ventilation ducts. Passengers received a full refund and were offered a complimentary cruise for the inconvenience.

=== Suicide ===
On July 1, 2007, David Ritcheson, the victim of the April 22, 2006 Harris County, Texas assault incident, jumped off the deck of Carnival Ecstasy and died.

=== Elevator death ===
During December 2015, a crew-member of the ship was working on an elevator while on board the Carnival Ecstasy. The ship had disabled an elevator safety mechanism while the elevator was in maintenance, when the elevator came down, killing the man. A couple, Matt Davis and his partner, witnessed the scene while on their way to dinner, filming the occurrence.

== Refits ==
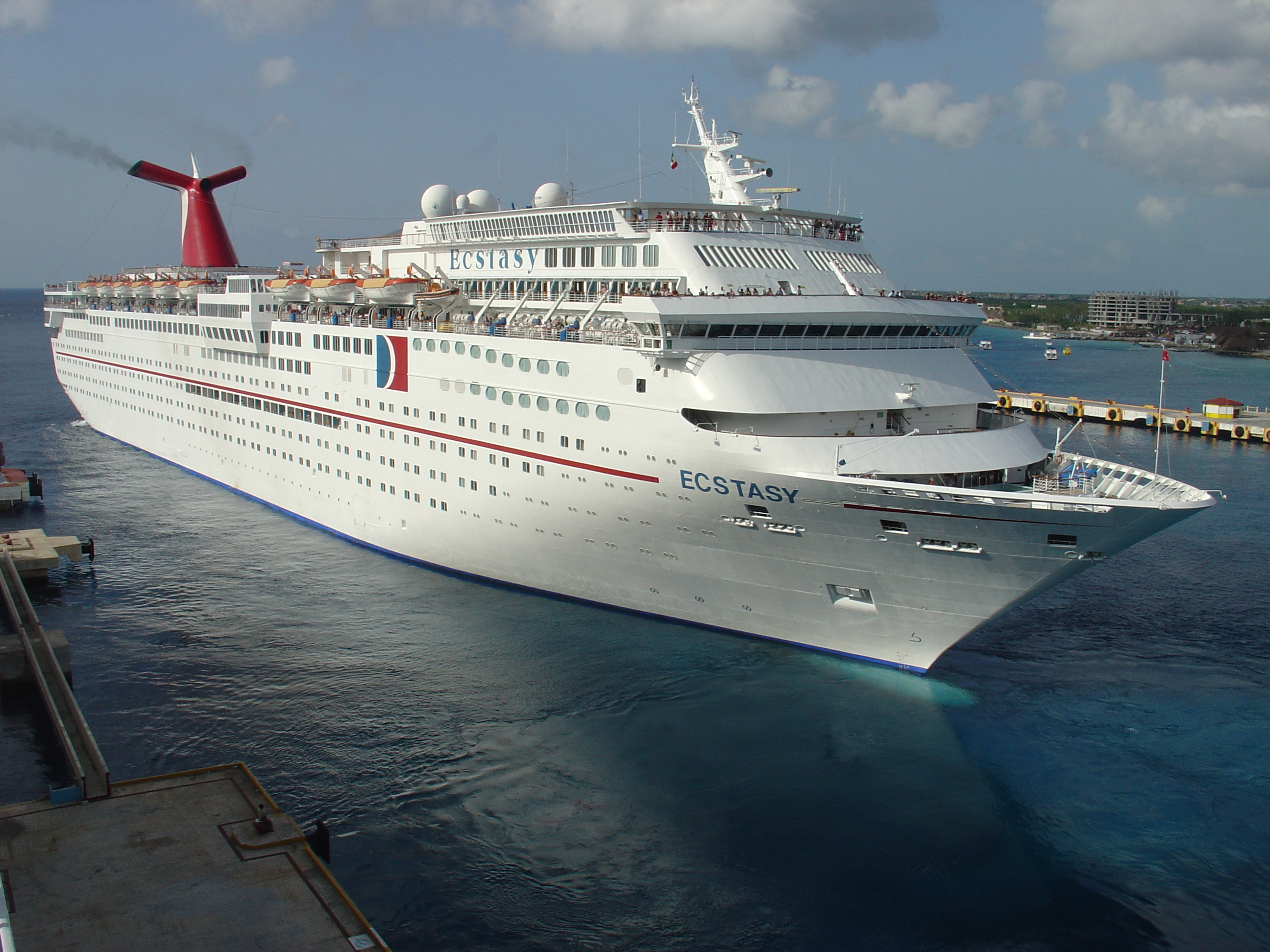
The Ecstasy as the ship originally appeared.

As part of the Evolutions of Fun upgrade program, in mid-2007 the Ecstasy was renamed the Carnival Ecstasy to match with the rest of the Carnival branded ship names in the fleet. Continuing with the upgrade program, in the fall of 2009 the ship was given a 28-day dry dock and a major multi-million-dollar refit. During the refit, 98 ocean view cabins were converted into balcony cabins along the mid and aft sections of the ship, some of the suites located on the Upper deck received extended balconies, the kid's wading pool area on the lower aft area of the ship was removed and converted into an adults-only Serenity area with sun loungers and two hot tubs, the aft pool was removed and converted into the Carnival WaterWorks water park with waterslides and fountains which also replaced the original waterslide at the main pool and the original kids wading pool, the main pool area was refurbished and given a resort-style appearance, a younger teens area Circle "C" was added, and various interior renovations and enhancements were made. In January, 2017, the ship underwent a two-week dry docking, at the Grand Bahama Shipyard in Freeport, Bahamas. The ship underwent a further 14 day dry dock in October, 2019, adding more venues and providing maintenance. The work was done again at Freeport, Bahamas.

== Final season and scrapping ==
In February 2022, it was announced that Carnival would retire Carnival Ecstasy as well as Carnival Sensation from the fleet. Sensation did not return to service, whereas Ecstasy resumed regular service in Mobile, Alabama from March until October 2022 and then would be retired after that point. This made Carnival Ecstasy the only ship out of the six retired Fantasy-class ships to offer guests a farewell cruise season. During her first voyage since March 2020, she suffered lifeboat issues in March 2022. The final voyage took place October 10–15, 2022 from Mobile, with port calls in Cozumel and Progreso and ended in Mobile on 15 October. The iconic 1934 Rolls-Royce Saloon aboard Carnival Ecstasy was relocated to the Gateway aboard Carnival Celebration, which launched three weeks after Carnival Ecstasy's final voyage. In her 31 years of service, the ship carried nearly 5.5 million guests.

The ship left Mobile for Miami on October 15, 2022, and arrived there on October 18, 2022. The ship left Miami on October 20, 2022, for her last voyage towards Aliağa for scrapping. On November 8, 2022, the ship arrived at the Aliağa scrapyards in Turkey to be demolished.
