= Carnival Inspiration =

Scrapped cruise ship

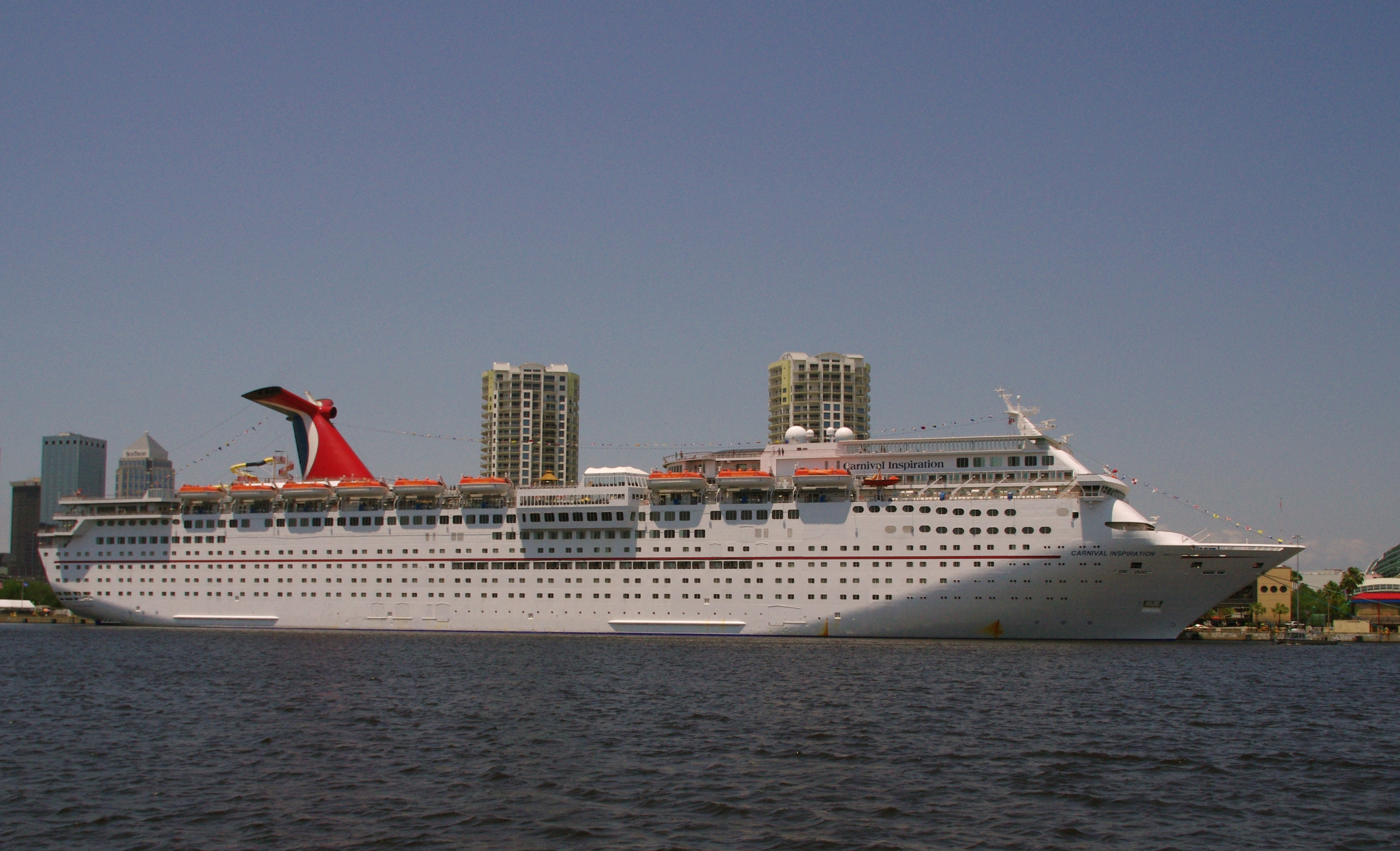
- Carnival Inspiration in Tampa, Florida

History
- Name: Inspiration (1996–2007); Carnival Inspiration (2007–2020)
- Operator: Carnival Cruise Line
- Port of registry: Panama City, Panama (1996–2000); Nassau, Bahamas (2000–2020)
- Builder: Kvaerner Masa-Yards; Helsinki New Shipyard; Helsinki, Finland
- Cost: $270 million
- Yard number: 489
- Christened: March 16, 1996
- Completed: 1996
- Acquired: February 22, 1996
- Maiden voyage: March 22, 1996
- In service: 1996
- Out of service: 2020
- Refit: 2007
- Identification: Call sign: C6FM5; IMO number: 9087489; MMSI number: 309484000
- Fate: Sold for scrap in July 2020
- Notes: Scrapped in 2022

General characteristics
- Class & type: Fantasy-class cruise ship
- Tonnage: 70,367 GT; 7,180 DWT
- Length: 260.60 m (855 ft 0 in)
- Beam: 31.50 m (103 ft 4 in)
- Draft: 7.80 m (25 ft 7 in)
- Decks: 14 (accessible to passengers)
- Installed power: 2 × Sulzer-Wärtsilä 8ZAV40S; 4 × Sulzer-Wärtsilä 12ZAV40S; 42,240 kW (combined)
- Propulsion: Two propellers
- Speed: 21 knots (39 km/h; 24 mph)
- Capacity: 2,056 passengers (lower berths); 2,610 passengers (all berths)
- Crew: 920

Carnival Inspiration (formerly Inspiration) was a Fantasy-class cruise ship operated by Carnival Cruise Line. Built by Kværner Masa-Yards at its Helsinki New Shipyard in Helsinki, Finland, she was floated out on April 1, 1996, and christened as Inspiration by Mary Anne Shula. During 2007, in common with all of her Fantasy-class sisters, she had the prefix Carnival added to her name and had some passenger areas and facilities were refurbished.

In July 2020, Carnival sold Carnival Inspiration, along with her sister ship Carnival Fantasy. Cruise Radio reported that Carnival Inspiration would likely be scrapped at Aliağa in Turkey. She made her final voyage from Long Beach and arrived at Aliağa on August 5, 2020 and by August 26, was being dismantled. Scrapping started on 5 April 2021, and concluded around January 2022. Initially she was intended to be broken up at the Ege Çelik yard which complied with the European Ship Recycling Regulation, but on arrival she was transferred to a neighbouring yard called Metas which, though belonging to the same owners, did not meet the EU standard. In an accident on 12 July 2021 a massive explosion within the hull instantly killed one worker, Yılmaz Demir, and caused another, Oğuz Taşkın, near total burns from which he died three days later.
