= Carnival Elation =

Cruise ship built in 1998

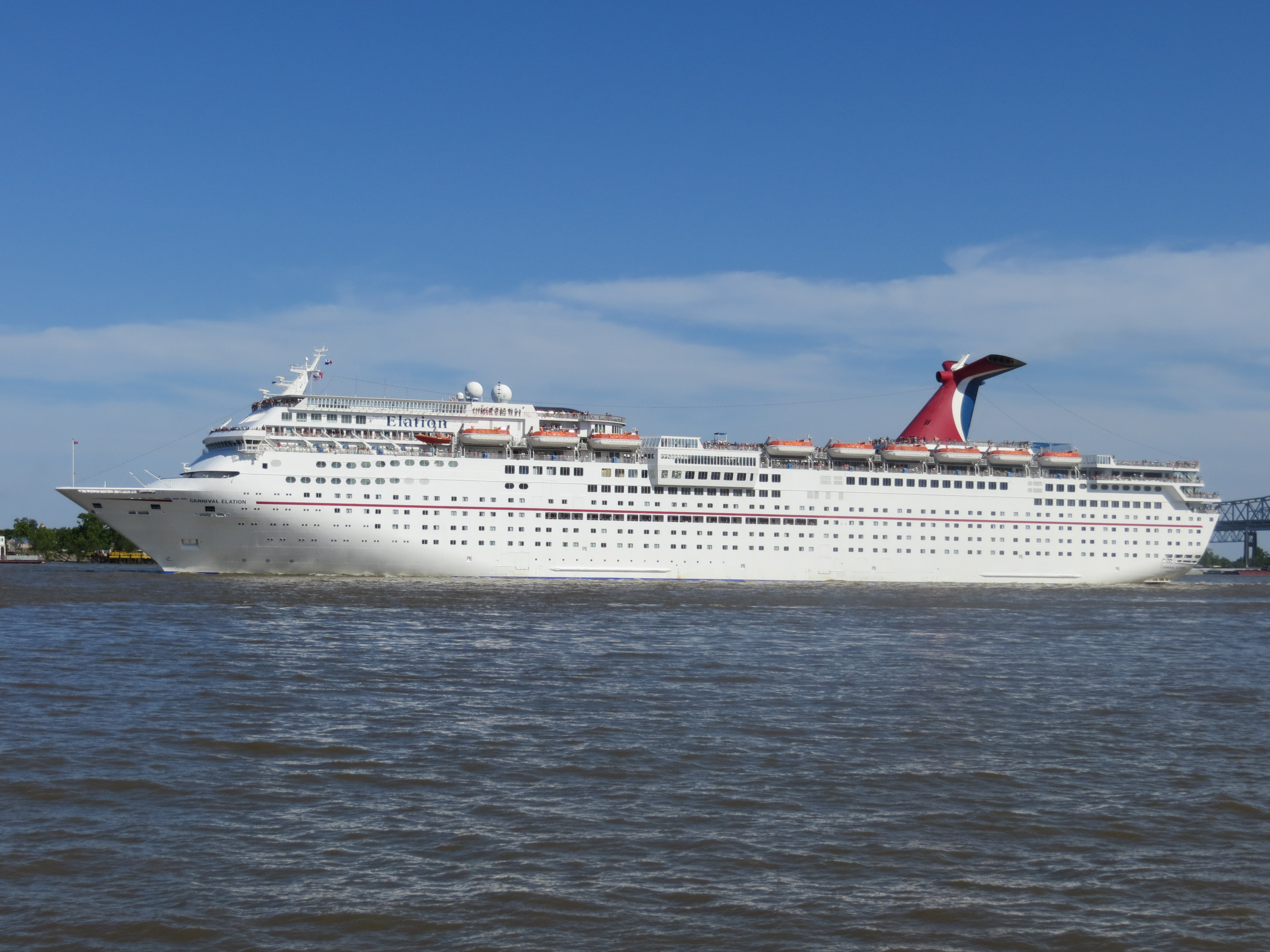
- Carnival Elation leaving the Port of New Orleans in May 2013

History
- Name: Elation (1998–2007); Carnival Elation (2007–present)
- Owner: Carnival Corporation
- Operator: Carnival Cruise Line
- Port of registry: Panama City, Panama
- Builder: Kvaerner Masa-Yards; Helsinki New Shipyard; Helsinki, Finland
- Yard number: 491
- Launched: January 4, 1998
- Sponsored by: Shari Arison Dorsman
- Completed: 1998
- Maiden voyage: March 20, 1998
- In service: 1998–present
- Refit: 2020
- Identification: Call sign: 3FOC5; IMO number: 9118721; MMSI number: 355831000
- Status: Active

General characteristics (As Built)
- Class & type: Fantasy-class cruise ship
- Tonnage: 70,367 GT
- Length: 855 ft (261 m)
- Decks: 13 (10 for passenger use)
- Installed power: 6 × Wärtsilä 12V38A; 47,520 kW (combined)
- Propulsion: Two ABB Azipod propulsion units
- Speed: 21 knots (39 km/h; 24 mph)
- Capacity: 2,052
- Crew: 900

General characteristics (After 2017 Refit)
- Tonnage: 71,909 GT
- Decks: 14 (11 with passenger access)
- Capacity: 2,130

General characteristics (After 2020 Refit)
- Capacity: 2,190

Carnival Elation (formerly Elation) is a Fantasy-class cruise ship operated by Carnival Cruise Line. Built by Kværner Masa-Yards at its Helsinki New Shipyard in Finland, she was floated out on January 4, 1998, and christened as Elation by Shari Arison Dorsman. Her inaugural cruise began March 20, 1998. During 2007, in common with all of her Fantasy-class sisters, she had the prefix Carnival added to her name.

== Layout ==
Carnival Elation is a 71,909-ton ship and is 855 feet long. She features 11 passenger decks and can accommodate up to 2,190 guests along with 900 crew members.

Despite being the smallest ship in the current Carnival fleet, Carnival Elation offers a wide array of activities and amenities. These include 12 lounges and bars, 3 swimming pools, 6 Jacuzzis, and 14 elevators.

== History ==
Elation was the first cruise ship to be equipped with an Azipod propulsion system. The pods give Elation better maneuverability compared with her sister ships that still used traditional shaft propellers.

On November 5, 2011 Carnival Elation moved from Mobile, Alabama to New Orleans.

In October 2017, Carnival Elation completed a month long dry dock during which an extra deck was added and various modifications to her public facilities were made. The ship's next dry dock in March 2020 added additional features found on other Carnival ships. The ship also received an additional 30 cabins that replaced the aft lounge located on the promenade deck.

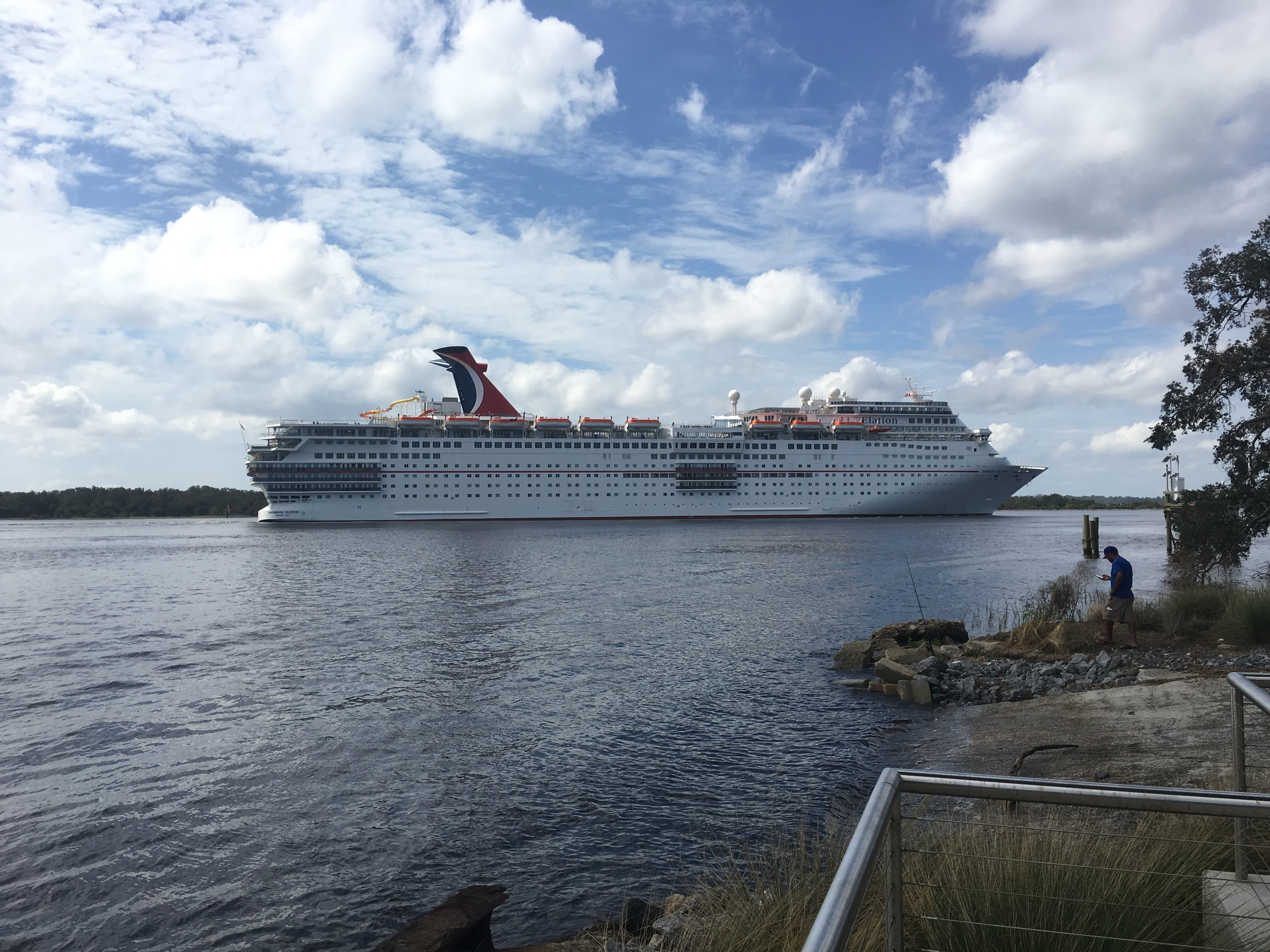
Carnival Elation in Jacksonville, Florida on October 7, 2017

== Current and former voyages ==
- 1998–2003: Cruises to Mexico from Los Angeles, California.
- 2003–2006: Cruises to the Western Caribbean from Galveston, TX.
- 2007–2010: Cruises to Mexico from San Diego CA.
- 2010–2011: Cruises from Mobile, Alabama to the Western Caribbean.
- 2011–2016: Cruises to the Western Caribbean from New Orleans, Louisiana.
- 2016–May 2019: Cruises to the Bahamas from Jacksonville, Florida.
- May 2019-March 2020, October 2021-April 2022: Cruises to the Caribbean and Bahamas from Port Canaveral, Florida.
- April 2022-Present: Cruises to the Bahamas from Jacksonville, Florida.

== Accidents and incidents ==
- On September 10, 2017, the Carnival Elation responded to a distress call and rescued one person from the sea who had been forced to abandon a vessel during Hurricane Irma.
- On January 19, 2018, a Kansas man pleaded guilty in a federal court in Kansas to second-degree murder after pushing his girlfriend Tamara Tucker off of the ship.
- On July 23, 2023, a 30-year-old man jumped overboard, 95 miles east of Melbourne, Florida.
