= Fantasy-class cruise ship =

Class of cruise ships

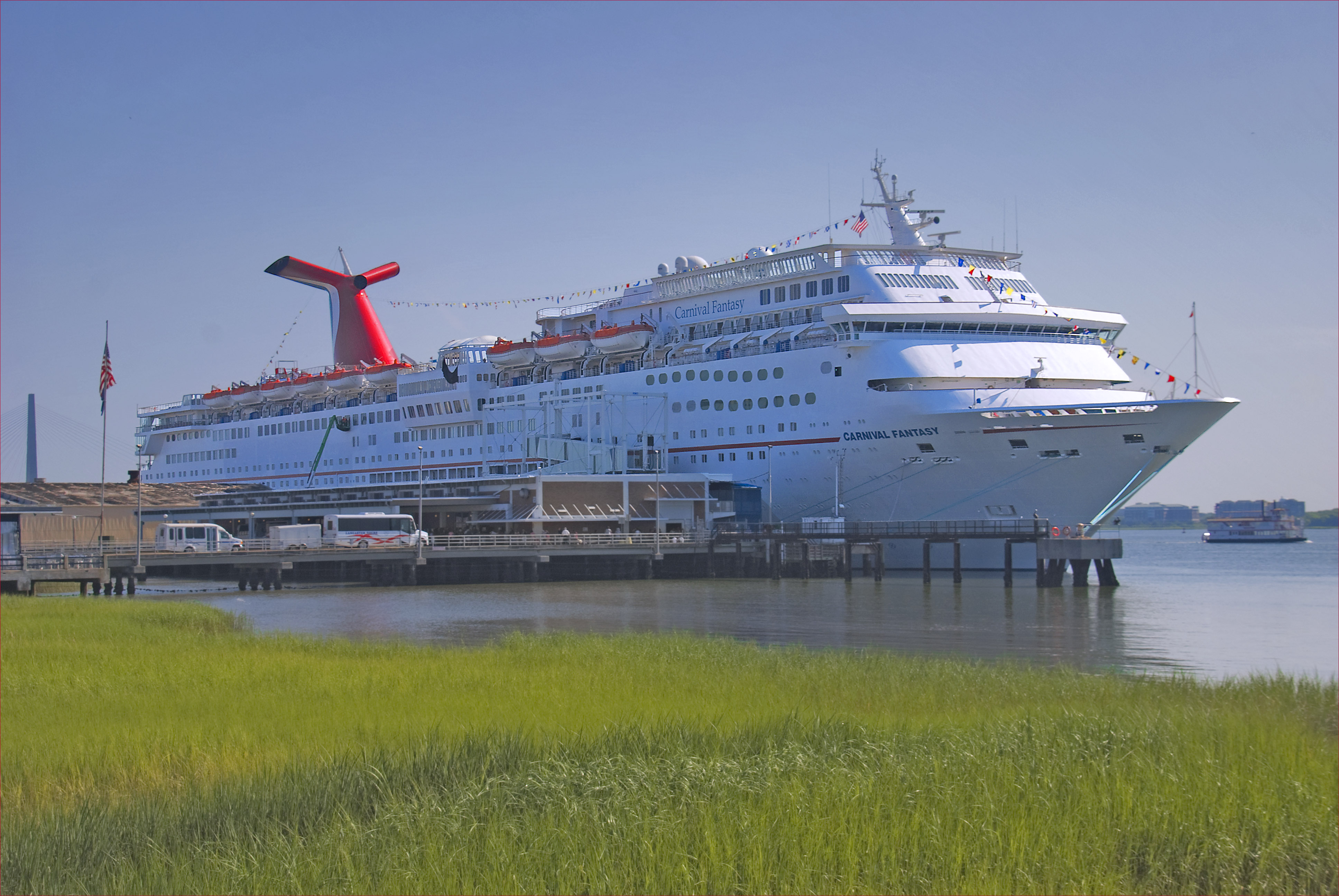
- Lead ship of the class, Carnival Fantasy, docked at Charleston, South Carolina in 2012

Class overview
- Builders: Kvaerner Masa-Yards; Helsinki, Finland
- Operators: Carnival Cruise Lines
- Preceded by: Holiday class (Historical)
- Succeeded by: Destiny class
- Planned: 8
- Completed: 8
- Active: 2
- Retired: 6

General characteristics
- Type: Cruise ship
- Tonnage: 70,367 GT-71,925 GT
- Length: 855 ft (261 m)
- Beam: 103 ft (31 m)
- Decks: 13–14 (10–11 passenger decks)
- Propulsion: 2 fixed pitch propellers on the first six ships. 2 ABB Azipod thrusters on the last two ships.
- Capacity: 2,052–2,190 passengers
- Crew: 920
- Notes: Smallest ships active in the Carnival Cruise Line fleet.

The Fantasy class is a cruise ship class operated by Carnival Cruise Lines. The first vessel of the class, Carnival Fantasy, entered service in 1990. All eight vessels of the class were constructed by Kvaerner Masa-Yards, in Helsinki, Finland, at the Hietalahti shipyard.

In late 2006, Carnival Cruise Lines refurbished the Fantasy-class fleet under the program name "Evolutions Of Fun". This was completed in 2010 and cost $250 million.

== Design ==
This class utilizes a "modern ocean/cruise liner" design, with most of its cabins situated within the hull and only a handful of suites on the superstructure, similar to the Holiday-class cruise ships built in the late 1980s. The Fantasy class is the only class currently in service for Carnival initially built with only a few balcony cabins. Carnival Elation and Carnival Paradise differ from the other ships of the class in that they are equipped with Azipod azimuth thrusters for propulsion. They were also the last cruise ships built with the lifeboats only on the upper deck.

== Ships ==
Ship	Year built	Sailed for Carnival	Gross tonnage	Homeport	Flag	Notes	Image
Current
Carnival Elation	1998	1998–present	71,909 GT	Jacksonville, Florida	Panama	Originally, Elation. Carnival Elation was the first cruise ship with Azipod propulsion units installed.	
Carnival Paradise	1998	1998–present	71,925 GT	Tampa, Florida	Panama	Originally, Paradise. Equipped with Azipod propulsion units.	
Former
Carnival Fantasy	1990	1990–2020	70,367 GT	Charleston, South Carolina	Panama	Originally, Fantasy. The scrapping process in Aliağa has been in progress since July 29, 2020.	
Carnival Ecstasy	1991	1991–2022	70,367 GT	Mobile, Alabama	Panama	Originally, Ecstasy. Retired from passenger service on October 15, 2022.	
Carnival Sensation	1993	1993–2022	70,367 GT	Miami	Bahamas	Originally, Sensation. The ship was last in passenger service in March 2020. The ship was sold for scrap in Aliağa in February 2022.	
Carnival Fascination	1994	1994–2020	70,367 GT	San Juan, Puerto Rico	Bahamas	Originally, Fascination. Sold in September 2020 and renamed Century Harmony in December 2020 In February 2022, Century Harmony was beached for scrapping in Gadani, Pakistan.	
Carnival Imagination	1995	1995–2020	70,367 GT	Long Beach, California	Bahamas	Originally, Imagination. The scrapping process in Aliağa has been in progress since September 16, 2020.	
Carnival Inspiration	1996	1996–2020	70,367 GT	Long Beach, California	Bahamas	Originally, Inspiration. The scrapping process in Aliağa has been in progress since August 2020.	
