= Carnival Fascination =

Cruise ship

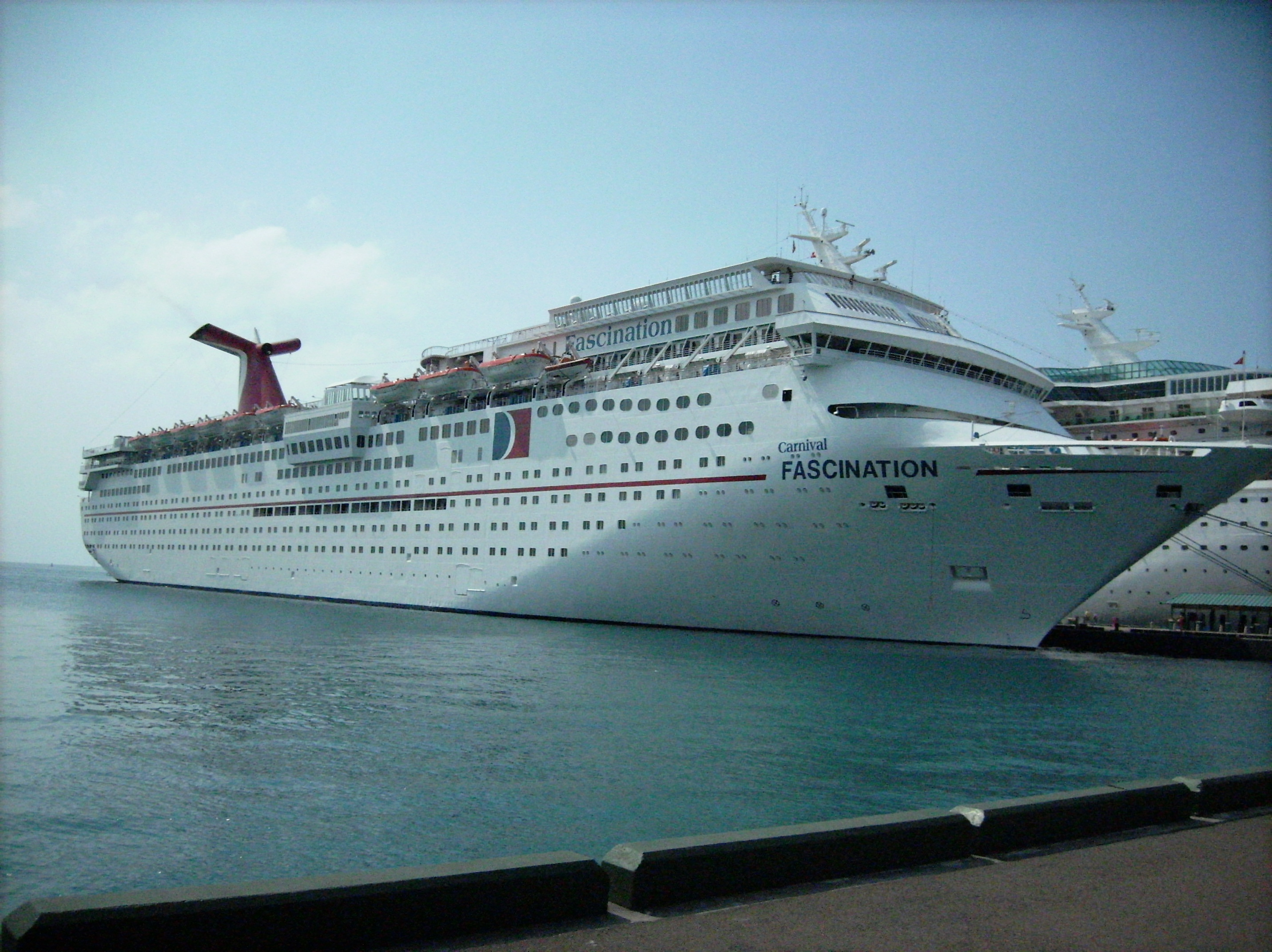
- Carnival Fascination in Nassau, Bahamas

History
- Name: Fascination (1994–2007); Carnival Fascination (2007–2020); Century Harmony (2020–2021); Y Harmony (2021–2022)
- Owner: Carnival Corporation & plc (1994–2020); Century Harmony Cruise Ltd (2020–2021); Nina Services Corp (2021–2022)
- Operator: Carnival Cruise Lines (1994–2020)
- Port of registry: Panama City, Panama (1994–2000) & (2020-2022); Nassau, Bahamas (2000–2020)
- Builder: Kvaerner Masa-Yards; Helsinki New Shipyard; Helsinki, Finland
- Yard number: 487
- Launched: 1 July 1994
- Sponsored by: Jeanne Farcus
- Completed: 1994
- Maiden voyage: 1994
- In service: 1994
- Out of service: 2020
- Refit: 2006
- Identification: Call sign: 3EMQ6; IMO number: 9041253; MMSI number: 309682000
- Fate: Scrapped in Gadani, Pakistan in 2022

General characteristics
- Class & type: Fantasy-class cruise ship
- Tonnage: 70,367 GT 70,538 GT (After refit); 7,180 DWT
- Length: 855 ft (261 m)
- Beam: 103 ft (31 m)
- Draft: 7.80 m (25 ft 7 in)
- Decks: 10
- Installed power: 2 × Sulzer-Wärtsilä 8ZAV40S; 4 × Sulzer-Wärtsilä 12ZAV40S; 42,240 kW (combined)
- Propulsion: Two propellers, 3 bow thrusters, 3 aft thrusters,
- Speed: 21 knots (39 km/h; 24 mph)
- Capacity: 2,056 passengers (lower berths); 2,634 passengers (all berths)
- Crew: 920

Carnival Fascination, originally Fascination, was a Fantasy-class cruise ship built at Helsinki, Finland in 1994. For most of her service with Carnival Cruise Lines she operated out of San Juan, Puerto Rico. In 2017 Carnival Fascination was chartered to the US Government to assist with hurricane relief work in the Virgin Islands. During the 2020 COVID-19 pandemic the ship was withdrawn from service and in November that year sold for conversion to a hotel ship for Century Harmony Cruise Ltd, that renamed her Century Harmony. However, in October 2021 she was sold for scrapping, arriving at Gadani Ship Breaking Yard in Pakistan as Y Harmony in February 2022.

== Carnival Cruise Line ==
The ship was the fourth of Carnival Cruise Lines' Fantasy-class built by Kværner Masa-Yards at its Helsinki New Shipyard in Finland. She was floated out on July 1, 1994, and christened Fascination by Jeanne Farcus. The ship was registered under the Panamanian flag and mostly home-ported in San Juan, Puerto Rico, sailing in the Caribbean year-round. In 2000 her port of registry was changed to Nassau, under the Bahamas flag. During 2007, in common with all of her Fantasy-class sisters, she had the prefix Carnival added to her name.

After the destruction caused in the United States Virgin Islands by Hurricanes Irma and Maria, Carnival Fascination was chartered to the Federal Emergency Management Agency (FEMA) from October 15, 2017, until February 3, 2018, to house relief workers at St Croix. This charter cost FEMA $74.7 million. At the end of the charter, the ship was given a further refit prior to returning to Carnival's services out of Puerto Rico.

In July 2020, as a result of Carnival Cruise Line reducing fleet capacity, Carnival Fascination entered a long term lay-up, with no planned date for the ship to return to service. In November 2020, the cruise line announced that the ship had been sold to Century Harmony Cruise Ltd.

=== Refits ===
Fascination was given a multimillion-dollar refurbishment while in dry dock during September 2006.

In January 2010 Carnival Fascination was again dry docked to be refurbished.

In January 2013, Carnival Fascination underwent another dry dock.

=== Areas of operation ===
Fascination sailed from New York between July 24 and September 4, 1994, before moving to San Juan, Puerto Rico. As Carnival Fascination, she sailed from Jacksonville, Florida to the Bahamas.

In 2013 and 2014, Coco Cay replaced Key West on some of Carnival Fascination's itineraries. Coco Cay is a private island in the Bahamas owned by rival cruise line Royal Caribbean International. In April, 2016, Carnival Fascination re-positioned to San Juan, Puerto Rico, where she undertook Southern Caribbean cruises.

=== Incidents ===
==== Power loss ====
In June 2010, Carnival Fascination lost engine power due to a technical malfunction while returning to Jacksonville, Florida. Power was restored after several hours, and the ship was able to return to Jacksonville, Florida under her own power.

==== Health inspection failure ====
In April 2013, it was reported that on February 21, 2013 Carnival Fascination failed a U.S. CDC health inspection after inspectors found insects in food preparation areas, dried food waste, insufficient chlorination in the pools, and insufficient sneeze guards at the salad bars. A satisfactory rating from the CDC is a score of 85 or higher. Carnival Fascination scored 84.

==== SARS-CoV-2 ====
In February 2020, the ship canceled a call to Saint Lucia over a COVID-19 scare, after a crew member reported illness, with flu like symptoms. The Carnival Fascination docked in Barbados but was not allowed to disembark passengers until the individual was declared negative for SARS-CoV-2.

== Century Harmony Cruise ==
When the ship was sold by Carnival to Century Harmony Cruise Limited and renamed Century Harmony, it was reported that the ship would be converted into a hotel ship in Asia. Although the ship was taken to China for refurbishment, news reports subsequently indicated that the ship's owners were considering scrapping the ship instead. In October 2021, Century Harmony was sold to Nina Services Corp, managed in Singapore, reportedly for demolition in Alang, India, and then renamed Y Harmony. However, she arrived at Gadani, Pakistan on 9 February 2022 and was beached for scrapping on 18 February.
