= Carnival Fantasy =

Scrapped cruise ship

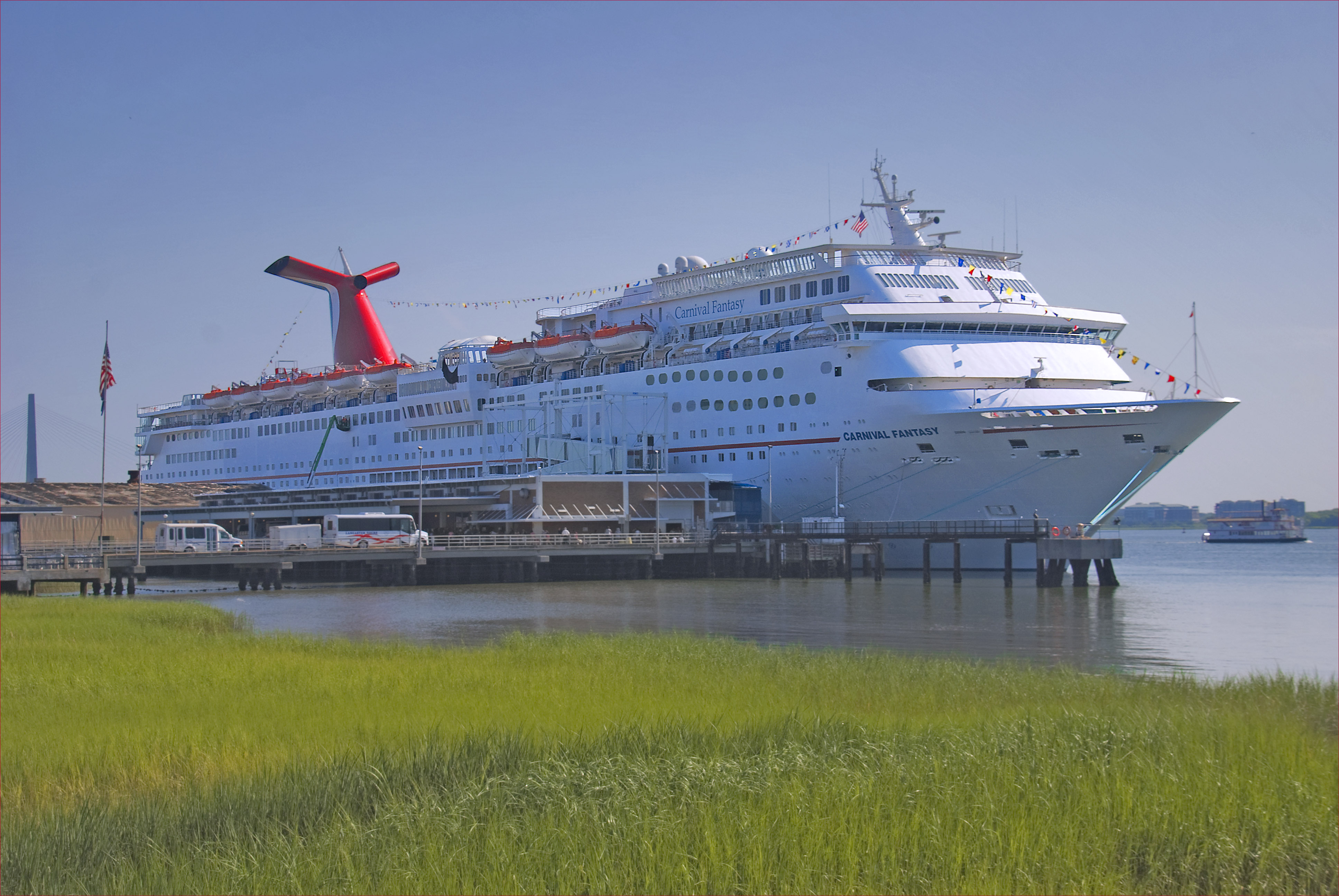
- Carnival Fantasy docked at Charleston, July 2012

History
- Name: Fantasy (1990–2007); Carnival Fantasy (2007–2020)
- Owner: Carnival Corporation & plc
- Operator: Carnival Cruise Line
- Port of registry: Panama City, Panama
- Builder: Kvaerner Masa-Yards; Helsinki New Shipyard; Helsinki, Finland
- Yard number: 479
- Launched: December 9, 1988
- Sponsored by: Tellervo Koivisto
- Christened: March 1, 1990
- Completed: January 27, 1990
- Maiden voyage: March 1, 1990
- In service: 1990–2020
- Out of service: July 15, 2020
- Refit: 2013; 2016 (Funship 2.0)
- Identification: Call sign: H3GS; IMO number: 8700773; MMSI number: 353486000
- Fate: Scrapped in Aliağa, Turkey in 2020

General characteristics
- Class & type: Fantasy-class cruise ship
- Tonnage: 70,367 GT; 7,180 DWT
- Length: 855 ft (261 m)
- Beam: 103 ft (31 m)
- Draft: 7.80 m (25 ft 7 in)
- Decks: 10
- Installed power: 2 × Sulzer-Wärtsilä 8ZAV40S; 4 × Sulzer-Wärtsilä 12ZAV40S; 42,240 kW (56,640 hp) (combined)
- Propulsion: Two propellers
- Speed: 21 knots (39 km/h; 24 mph)
- Capacity: 2,052 passengers (lower berths); 2,675 passengers (all berths)
- Crew: 920

Carnival Fantasy (formerly Fantasy) was a cruise ship operated by Carnival Cruise Line. She was the first ship of her namesake class, which was the largest by number of ships, before the scrapping of the Fantasy, Inspiration, Imagination, and the selling of the Fascination in 2020. Built by Kværner Masa-Yards at its Helsinki New Shipyard in Helsinki, Finland, she was floated out on December 9, 1988, completed on January 27, 1990 and formally named on March 1, 1990, as Fantasy by Tellervo Koivisto, wife of the then President of Finland, Mauno Koivisto. During 2007, in common with all of her Fantasy-class sisters, she had the prefix "Carnival" added to her name.

In July 2020, Carnival Corporation & plc confirmed that it had sold Carnival Fantasy for scrap.

== Service history ==
Fantasy entered service in 1990 and was by 2020 the oldest ship in the fleet. Until 1995 she cruised from the Port of Miami when she relocated to Port Canaveral.

In the Fall of 2006, Fantasy was the first Carnival ship to move back to Louisiana after Hurricane Katrina with New Orleans becoming its home port, undertaking cruises to Mexico.

Carnival Fantasy spent a month in drydock being refitted in the Fall of 2008.

On September 17, 2009, Carnival announced that Carnival Fantasy would be based out of Mobile, Alabama. Subsequently, she was relocated to Charleston, South Carolina.

Carnival Fantasy was refitted in February 2016. The upgrades included being fitted with diesel engine scrubbers as well the alteration of some of the restaurants and child care areas on the ship. In November 2016, she moved back to Mobile.

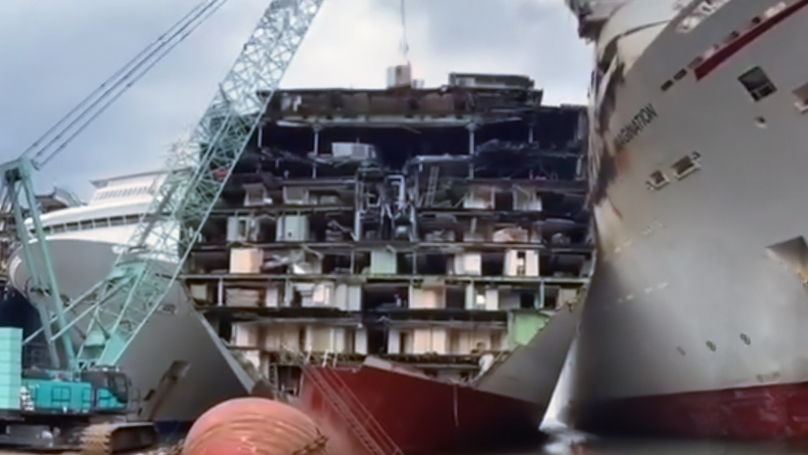
Carnival Fantasy being scrapped in Aliaga, Turkey in October 2020.

Carnival Fantasy was again refitted in January 2019. The ship assisted the US Coast Guard in rescuing 23 people at sea in April 2019. On March 14, 2020, Carnival announced suspension of service for all of its ships due to the COVID-19 pandemic. It was previously announced that service would resume on April 10, but the suspension was extended to October 1, 2020. On July 23, 2020, Carnival announced the sale of Carnival Fantasy and Carnival Inspiration. On July 15, 2020, the ship left Miami for Aliaga, She was beached in Turkey for scrap on July 29, 2020. A report on August 26, 2020, indicated that the scrapping process had begun. Scrapping was completed in September 2021.
