= Float-out =

Event during ship construction marking the first time the ship is floated

Float-out is the process in shipbuilding that follows the keel laying and precedes the fitting-out process. It is analogous to launching a ship, a specific process that has largely been discontinued in modern shipbuilding. Both floating-out and launching are the times when the ship leaves dry land and becomes waterborne for the first time, and often take place during ceremonies celebrating and commemorating that event.

== Launching ==
Prior to the large-scale use of drydocks (building or graving docks) for constructing ships, most vessels were constructed on a slipway, i.e. an inclined building platform sloping toward a body of water into which the ship would be launched.

== Contemporary shipbuilding ==
The launching of ships has been largely replaced by the "floating" process. After a ship is ordered for construction, its keel is laid in a drydock. Construction of the ship continues in the dock, usually in the form of prefabricated units that are assembled.

After the empty hull has been substantially completed, sluice gates are opened and the drydock fills with water. The dock gates are then opened and the ship is pulled out by tugboat to a berth where the remaining construction continues namely fitting out. This usually includes further construction of the superstructure, attaching of masts and funnels, and the installation of equipment and furnishings.

The completed ship will usually return to drydock for installation of other equipment, propulsion parts, and the painting of its hull.

The first superliner to be constructed in this manner was SS United States, but the history of "floating" ships rather than "launching" goes back more than one hundred years before that vessel's construction. SS Great Britain designed by Isambard Kingdom Brunel was constructed in drydock and floated on 19 July 1843. She is currently in Bristol, England, United Kingdom.

== Naming ceremony ==
Ships which are launched typically are christened and formally named at their launching ceremonies, even though they are not completed until later. Some recent passenger vessels which were constructed in drydocks were not formally christened when floated out. The naming ceremonies of RMS Queen Mary 2 and MS Freedom of the Seas took place after completion and delivery to their owners, in the case of Freedom of the Seas after her first transatlantic crossing.
