= Hietalahti shipyard =

Shipyard in Helsinki, Finland

Coordinates: 60.158°N 24.929°E

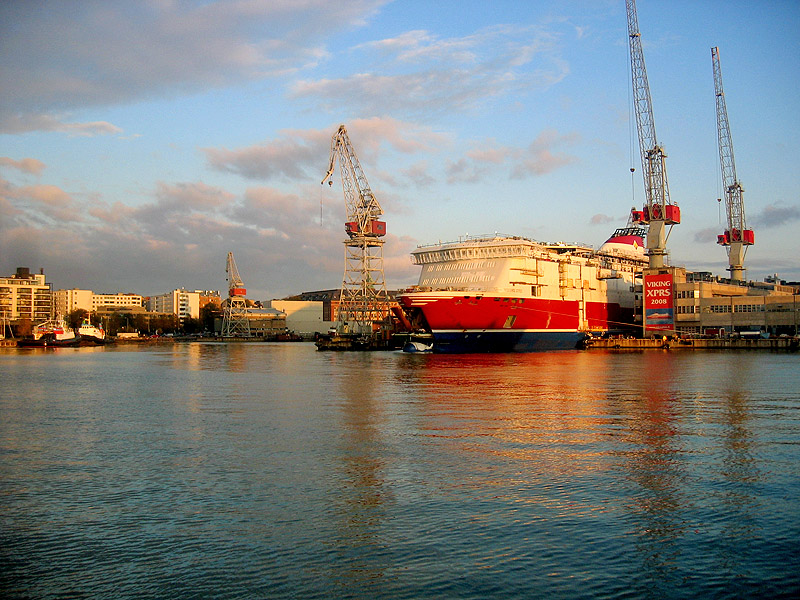
MS Viking XPRS under construction at the Hietalahti shipyard in October 2007.

Hietalahti shipyard (also known as Helsinki New Shipyard, Finnish: Helsingin uusi telakka) is a shipyard in Hietalahti, in downtown Helsinki, Finland. Since 2019, it has been operated by a company named Helsinki Shipyard.

== History ==
The shipyard, first known as Helsingfors Skeppsdocka (Finnish: Hietalahden Laivatelakka) and later as Sandvikens Skeppsdocka och Mekaniska Verkstad (Finnish: Hietalahden Sulkutelakka ja Konepaja), was founded in 1865 and delivered its first ship in 1868. It also constructed horse-drawn trams and railroad cars. Wärtsilä bought the parent company Kone ja Silta in the 1930s; it included also the Crichton-Vulcan shipyard in Turku. In 1965 the yard was renamed Wärtsilä Helsingin Telakka (Wärtsilä Helsinki Shipyard).

After the bankruptcy of Wärtsilä Marine in 1989 the yards were operated by the newly formed Masa Yards, bought by the Norwegian Kværner group in the mid 1990s and known as Kvaerner Masa Yards. In 2005 the company merged with the Aker Finnyards shipyard in Rauma and was renamed Aker Yards in 2006. In 2008 Aker Yards was acquired by STX Europe.

The shipyard and the cluster of cooperating companies have a strong know-how in shipbuilding for Arctic conditions; 60% of the icebreakers of the world are built in Helsinki.

== See also ==
- List of ships built at Hietalahti shipyard
