= Vyborg (icebreaker) =

Russian icebreaker

History

Russia
- Name: Vyborg (Выборг)
- Namesake: Vyborg
- Owner: Rosmorport
- Ordered: 20 August 2021
- Builder: Vyborg Shipyard (Vyborg, Russia)
- Cost: 10.5 billion (contract price); 17.8 billion (current estimate)
- Yard number: 510
- Laid down: 16 November 2022
- Completed: 2025 (planned); November 2028 (current estimate)
- Identification: IMO number: 1022421
- Status: Under construction

General characteristics
- Class & type: Project 21900M2 icebreaker
- Tonnage: 11,903 GT; 3,571 NT; 5,200 DWT
- Displacement: 14,086 t (13,864 long tons)
- Length: 119.8 m (393 ft)
- Beam: 27.5 m (90 ft)
- Draught: 8.5 m (28 ft)
- Depth: 12.40 m (41 ft)
- Ice class: RS Icebreaker7
- Installed power: 4 × Kolomna 20D500-EGRBP (4 × 6,786 kW)
- Propulsion: Diesel-electric; two Zvezdochka azimuth thrusters (2 × 9,000 kW)
- Speed: 17 knots (31 km/h; 20 mph) (open water); Up to 1.5 m (4.9 ft) ice
- Crew: 35 crew; 22 special personnel
- Aviation facilities: Helideck for Mi-8 and Ka-32

Vyborg (Russian: Выборг) is a Russian Project 21900M2 diesel-electric icebreaker. It is under construction at Vyborg Shipyard in Russia and scheduled for delivery to Rosmorport in late 2028.

== Development and construction ==
In the 2000s, Russia began renewing its state-owned icebreaker fleet that, at the time, consisted mainly of Soviet-era vessels dating back to the 1970s and 1980s. Following the commissioning of two Project 21900 (Moskva and Sankt-Peterburg) in the late 2000s and three Project 21900M icebreakers (Vladivostok, Murmansk and Novorossiysk) in the mid-2010s, further two icebreakers were included in the Comprehensive Plan for the Modernization and Expansion of the Main Infrastructure for the period until 2024. In April 2019, Rosmorport contracted Vympel Design Bureau to develop a slightly revised design based on the previously-built vessels.

On 5 September 2019, the first Project 21900M2 icebreaker was awarded to the Russian shipbuilder Pella Shipyard who subcontracted the construction to its Hamburg-based subsidiary Pella Sietas. However, by early 2021 the construction of the icebreaker had stalled due to financial difficulties of the German shipyard who later filed for insolvency.

In April 2020, Rosmorport began looking for a shipyard to build the second Project 21900M2 icebreaker. The first two tenders failed to attract any bids due to too low contract price. The third tender received a single bid that was disqualified after it became clear that, due to its inland location, the winning Russian shipyard would have had to subcontract the construction of the icebreaker to a Turkish or Chinese shipyard. On 26 October, the shipbuilding contract was awarded to Vyborg Shipyard who had previously built two icebreakers based on the preceding Project 21900M design.

The production of the icebreaker began with a steel cutting ceremony on 31 August 2022 and the keel was laid on 16 November. Initially scheduled for delivery in 2025, the commissioning of the new icebreaker has been postponed to November 2028 as domestic alternatives had to be developed to replace previous foreign-sourced components that became unavailable due to international sanctions imposed following the 2022 Russian invasion of Ukraine. The contract price was also increased from the previous 10.5 billion rubles to 17.8 billion rubles.

Like the preceding Project 21900 and 21900M icebreakers, the new icebreaker will be named after major Russian port city, Vyborg.

== Design ==
Vyborg will be 119.8 metres (393 ft) long overall and 104 metres (341 ft) between perpendiculars, and have a moulded beam of 27.5 metres (90 ft). Fully laden, the 14,086-tonne (13,864-long-ton) icebreaker will draw 8.5 metres (28 ft) of water. Vyborg's ice class, Icebreaker7, is intended for year-round icebreaking operations in the Arctic seas and river estuaries. The icebreaker will have a crew of 35 and accommodation for 22 additional personnel.

Vyborg will have a fully integrated diesel-electric propulsion system with main diesel generators supplying power for both main propulsion as well as ship's service loads while underway. The main power plant will consist of four 20-cylinder Kolomna 20D500-EGRBP diesel engines rated at 6,786 kilowatts (9,100 hp) each. For main propulsion, Vyborg will be fitted with two electrically driven 9,000-kilowatt (12,000 hp) azimuth thrusters manufactured by Zvezdochka. With a total propulsion power of 18,000 kilowatts (24,000 hp), Vyborg will be able to achieve a service speed of 17 knots (31 km/h; 20 mph) in open water and break up to 1.5 metres (4.9 ft) thick level ice. In addition, the icebreaker will have a 1,000-kilowatt (1,300 hp) bow thruster for maneuvering.
