= Project 21900 icebreaker =

Russian icebreakers

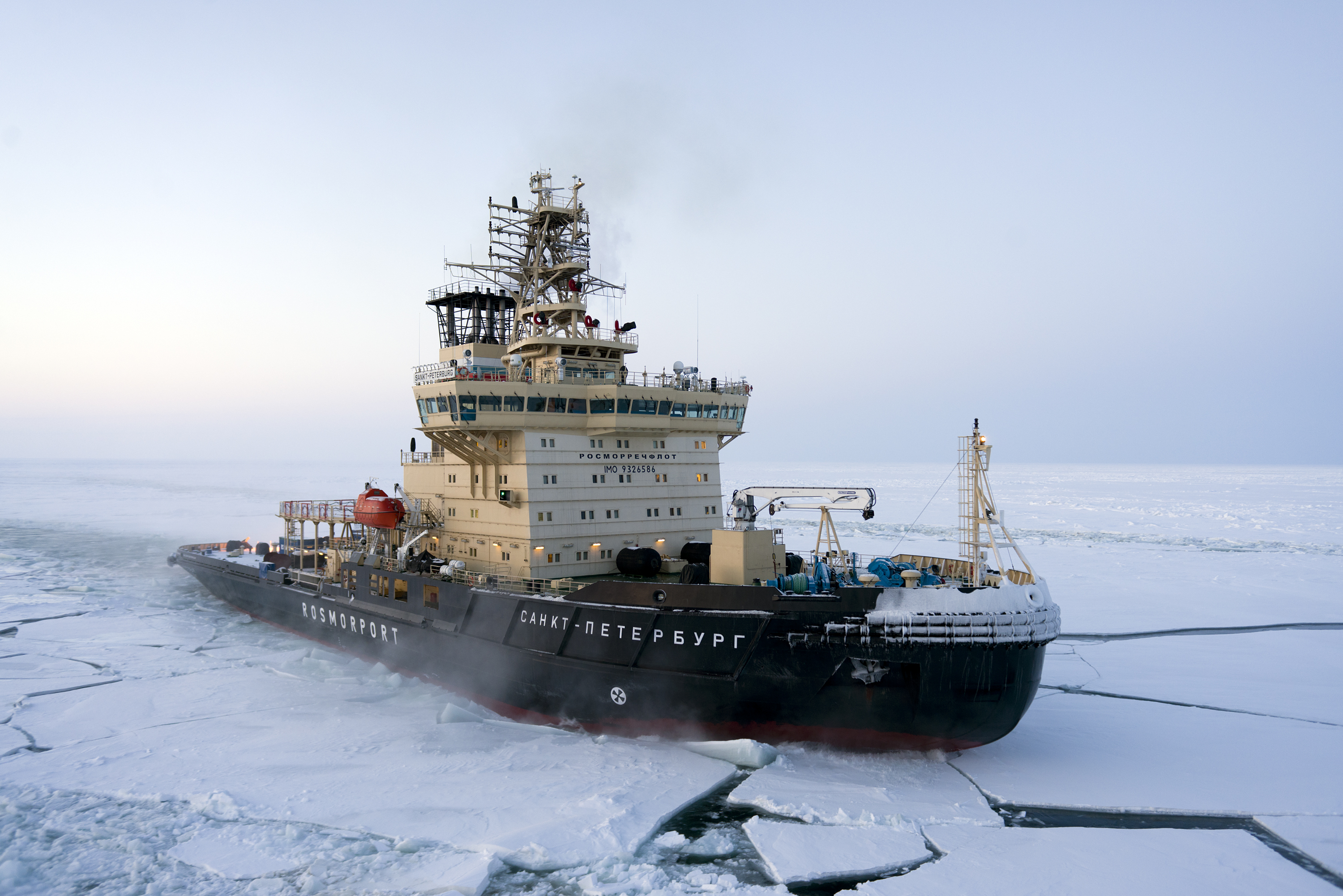
- Sankt-Peterburg, the second Project 21900 icebreaker, underway in Kara Sea in 2015

Class overview
- Builders: Baltic Shipyard (Saint Petersburg, Russia); Vyborg Shipyard (Vyborg, Russia); Arctech Helsinki Shipyard (Helsinki, Finland); Pella Sietas (Hamburg, Germany; planned)
- Operators: Rosmorport
- Built: 2008–2009 (21900); 2015–2016 (21900M); 2023–present (21900M2)
- Planned: 7
- Building: 1
- Completed: 5
- Cancelled: 1

General characteristics (21900, 21900M)
- Type: Icebreaker
- Displacement: 14,300 t (14,100 long tons)
- Length: 114–119.8 m (374–393 ft) (overall)
- Beam: 27.5 m (90 ft)
- Draft: 8.5 m (28 ft) (design)
- Ice class: RS Icebreaker6 (Project 21900 and 21900M); RS Icebreaker7 (Project 21900M2)
- Installed power: Four diesel generating sets
- Propulsion: Diesel-electric; two azimuth thrusters (2 × 8.2–9 MW)
- Speed: 16–17 knots (30–31 km/h; 18–20 mph); 3–3.5 knots (5.6–6.5 km/h; 3.5–4.0 mph) in 1.0 m (3.3 ft) ice
- Crew: 25
- Aviation facilities: Helideck for Ka-32/Ka-226 (21900) or Mi-8 (21900M and 21900M2)

Project 21900 icebreakers and their derivative designs are a series of Russian diesel-electric icebreakers built in the 2000s. They are also sometimes referred to using the type size series designation LK-16. (Note: The type size series designation "LK-16" (Russian: ЛК-16) comes from the Russian language word for "icebreaker" (Russian: ледокол, romanized: ledokol) and the propulsion power (16 megawatts).)

The two Project 21900 icebreakers built by Baltic Shipyard, Moskva and Sankt-Peterburg, were the first non-nuclear icebreakers built by a Russian shipyard in over three decades and the first new icebreakers ordered following the dissolution of the Soviet Union. Few years later, three additional icebreakers of a slightly improved design referred to as Project 21900M were ordered from Vyborg Shipyard: two vessels (Vladivostok and Novorossiysk) were built in Russia and the third (Murmansk) was subcontracted to the Finnish shipbuilder Arctech Helsinki Shipyard. One icebreaker of a revised Project 21900M2 design was ordered from Pella Sietas in 2019 and another from Vyborg Shipyard in 2021; the latter (Vyborg) is under construction as of as of 2026.

== Development and construction ==
=== Project 21900 ===
In the early 2000s, Russia's state-owned icebreaker fleet consisted mainly of Soviet-era vessels dating back to the 1970s and 1980s. Whereas the Soviet Union had been steadily building up the world's largest icebreaker fleet, Russia had managed to commission only one nuclear-powered icebreaker during the decade following its dissolution. In addition, the construction of another nuclear-powered icebreaker had been suspended in the mid-1990s due to lack of funds and a number of older diesel-powered icebreakers were written off in the 1990s.

Despite efforts to extend the service life of the deteriorating Soviet-era icebreaker fleet and a number of private Russian companies acquiring their own icebreaking vessels to serve their needs, a fleet renewal plan was direly needed to avoid a situation where older icebreakers would be decommissioned before their replacements were ready. As a result, the federal program Modernization of the transport system of Russia (2002–2010) included recapitalizing the icebreaker fleet with a number of new vessels. Among these were two medium-sized diesel-electric icebreakers for service in the Gulf of Finland and Saint Petersburg area.

In July 2004, the Saint Petersburg-based Baltic Shipyard won an international tender for the construction of two 16-megawatt diesel-electric icebreakers for Rosmorport, a state-owned company established in 2003 to manage Russia's port infrastructure and operate its fleet of diesel-powered icebreakers. The other bidders for the $150 million contract included the Finnish shipbuilders Kvaerner Masa-Yards and Aker Finnyards that had previously built a large number of icebreakers for the Soviet Union. Although Baltic Shipyard had built five Arktika-class nuclear-powered icebreakers in 1975–1992 and had the sixth under construction at the time, these would be the first non-nuclear icebreakers built on a Russian shipyard in over three decades and the first new icebreakers ordered following the dissolution of the Soviet Union. While the state budget did not initially allocate funding for the new icebreakers, the construction was nonetheless set to begin already in 2004 and the lead ship was to be delivered by November 2006.

The lead ship of Project 21900 icebreakers, Moskva, was delivered on 11 December 2008 and the sister ship, Sankt-Peterburg, on 12 July 2009.

=== Project 21900M ===
Following the challenging winter navigating season of 2010–2011, during which ice conditions in the Baltic Sea became so severe that Russia was forced to call in the nuclear-powered icebreaker Vaygach from Murmansk to escort ships in the eastern Gulf of Finland, the Russian government decided to continue the fleet renewal within the framework of the federal program Development of the Transport System of Russia (2010–2020) with three additional 16-megawatt diesel-electric icebreakers. While the initial agreement was signed between Rosmorport and the state-owned United Shipbuilding Corporation (USC) at the Baltic Shipyard, the construction of the first icebreaker awarded to the non-USC-affiliated Vyborg Shipyard on 2 December 2011. On 23 February 2012, the remaining two vessels were also contracted to Vyborg Shipyard which was simultaneously acquired by USC to solve the shipyard's financial problems. Hull assembly, outfitting and commissioning of one icebreaker was subcontracted to the Finnish shipbuilding company Arctech Helsinki Shipyard which, at the time, was a joint venture between USC and a subsidiary of the South Korean STX Offshore & Shipbuilding.

The new icebreakers, referred to as Project 21900M, represented a further development of the preceding design. The lead ship, Vladivostok, was delivered by Vyborg Shipyard on 23 September 2015. She was followed by the Arctech-built Murmansk on 25 December 2015 and the final vessel of the series, Novorossiysk, on 26 December 2016.

=== Project 21900M2 ===
In April 2019, Rosmorport contracted Vympel Design Bureau to develop a new 18-megawatt diesel-electric icebreaker concept, Project 21900M2, based on the previous Project 21900M design. Two new icebreakers were planned to be built under the Comprehensive Plan for the Modernization and Expansion of the Main Infrastructure for the period until 2024.

In August 2019, Rosmorport opened a RUB 7,549,241,400 (Note: About 100 million euro in August 2019.) tender for the construction of a 18-megawatt icebreaker to ensure year-round operation of the Russian Far East. According to the tender, the new icebreaker would be delivered by 30 September 2024. On 5 September 2019, it was announced that the contract was awarded to the Otradnoye-based Pella Shipyard which was the only bidder. However, construction of the vessel has been subcontracted to Pella Sietas in Hamburg, Germany, for which the 100 million euro order is the biggest single contract in the company history. The keel of the vessel was laid on 29 October 2020. However, due to the financial difficulties of the shipyard, construction had reportedly not progressed since early 2021, and in July 2021 the shipyard filed for insolvency.

On 2 April 2020, Rosmorport opened a second tender for a similar icebreaker to be constructed for the Baltic Sea with delivery by 10 December 2024. However, the Russian newspaper Kommersant speculated that the contract price of RUB 7,309,329,900 (Note: About 85 million euro in April 2020.) might be too low to attract bidders for a vessel with foreign-sourced components due to the volatility of the Russian ruble. The tender was extended by two weeks in late April and finally declared invalid on 12 May after no bids had been submitted for the construction of the new icebreaker. It was then proposed to increase the value of the contract by 10 %. On 12 November 2020, Rosmorport opened a revised tender with a higher contract price of RUB 8,033,958,400. (Note: About 88 million euro in November 2020.) However, it too failed to attract any bids and was declared invalid on 7 December 2020. In May 2021, Rosmorport re-opened the tender again with an even higher contract price of about RUB 10.5 billion. (Note: About 117 million euro in May 2021.) Having received no bids by the original deadline of 14 July, Rosmorport extended the tender until 26 July, but again no bids were submitted for the construction of the icebreaker. The tender was re-opened again on 5 August with the previous contract price and closed on 18 August. On 20 August, it was announced that the shipbuilding contract had been awarded to the Samara-based Nefteflot CJSC. As the shipyard is located inland along the Volga river, the actual construction of the 14,300-tonne icebreaker was expected to be subcontracted to either Chinese or Turkish shipyard. However, Nefteflot was later disqualified and the tender was re-opened in October. On 26 October, the shipbuilding contract was awarded to the only bidder, Vyborg Shipyard, which had previously built two icebreakers based on the preceding Project 21900M design. Steel cutting began on 31 August 2022 and the keel was laid on 16 November. However, already in October 2022 the General Director of Vyborg Shipyard, Aleksandr Solovyov, stated that the delivery had been postponed from 2025 to late 2028 and 8 to 10 billion rubles of additional financing would likely be required to complete the construction of the icebreaker. In January 2025, the Russian government issued a decree allowing postponing the delivery of the Project 21900M2 icebreaker contracted to Vyborg Shipyard to 30 November 2028. In addition, the contact price was increased from 10.5 billion to 17.8 billion rubles. (Note: About 174 million euro in January 2025 based on the official exchange rate.)

== Design ==
=== Project 21900 and 21900M ===
Project 21900 icebreakers are 114 metres (374 ft) long overall and have a moulded beam of 27.5 metres (90 ft). Fully laden, the 14,300-tonne (14,100-long-ton) icebreakers draw 8.5 metres (28 ft) of water. While Project 21900M icebreakers are slightly longer at 119.8 metres (393 ft), they have the same beam, design draught and displacement. The general layout of both designs is somewhat similar with the largest external difference being the helideck: Project 21900 icebreakers have a slightly smaller landing area located behind the superstructure while in Project 21900M and 21900M2 icebreakers the helideck has been moved to the forecastle and increased in size.

Both Project 21900 and 21900M icebreakers have a fully integrated diesel-electric propulsion system with four main diesel generators supplying power for both main propulsion as well as the ship's service loads while underway. In the first two vessels, the main power plant consists of two 4,500-kilowatt (6,000 hp) 9-cylinder Wärtsilä 9L32 and two 6,000-kilowatt (8,000 hp) 12-cylinder Wärtsilä 12V32 medium-speed diesel engines. In the three following vessels, all four main engines are identical 12-cylinder Wärtsilä 12V32E units rated at 6,960 kilowatts (9,330 hp) each. In addition, all icebreakers have two Wärtsilä 4L20 auxiliary diesel generators for use when the vessel is at port.

For main propulsion, both Project 21900 and 21900M icebreakers are fitted with two electrically driven Steerprop Z-drive azimuth thrusters with four-bladed stainless steel propellers. In the first two vessels, the propellers were in pusher configuration whereas the later icebreakers had more efficient forward-facing propellers. Each propeller is driven by two electric propulsion motors in tandem: in Project 21900, they are rated at 4,100 kW (5,500 hp) each while in Project 21900M the motors have been uprated to 4,500-kilowatt (6,000 hp). The resulting combined propulsion power output is about 16,000 kilowatts (21,000 hp) (21900) to 18,000 kilowatts (24,000 hp) (21900M). In addition, the icebreakers have a single transverse bow thruster for maneuvering.

Project 21900 icebreakers are strengthened to Russian Maritime Register of Shipping ice class Icebreaker6 which is intended for icebreaking operations in non-Arctic freezing seas where the ice is up to 1.5 metres (5 ft) thick. While officially the Project 21900M icebreakers have the same ice class, their hulls and propulsion systems are strengthened to meet the requirements of Icebreaker7 which is a higher ice class intended for icebreaking operations in the Arctic.

=== Project 21900M2 ===
Project 21900M2 icebreakers will be largely similar to the preceding Project 21900M design. Key technical differences include for example selective catalytic reduction (SCR) units and exhaust gas scrubbers to reduce nitrogen oxide (NOx) and sulfur oxide (SOx) emissions, respectively. The new vessels will also be officially classified with ice class Icebreaker7 in accordance with the Russian Maritime Register of Shipping requirements and be compliant with the International Code for Ships Operating in Polar Waters (Polar Code).

Due to the international sanctions during the 2022 Russian invasion of Ukraine, almost all imported equipment will have to be replaced with domestic alternatives. Although the layout of the icebreaker will remain largely unchanged, the design needs to be reworked for Russian equipment such as main diesel engines manufactured by Kolomna Locomotive Works and azimuthing propulsion units supplied by Zvezdochka.

== Ships in class ==
Name	Project	Builder	IMO number	Delivered	Status	Image	Ref
Moskva	21900	Baltic Shipyard (Saint Petersburg, Russia)	9326574	2008	In service		
Sankt-Peterburg	21900	Baltic Shipyard (Saint Petersburg, Russia)	9326586	2009	In service		
Vladivostok	21900M	Vyborg Shipyard (Vyborg, Russia)	9658654	2015	In service		
Murmansk	21900M	Arctech Helsinki Shipyard (Helsinki, Finland)	9658666	2015	In service		
Novorossiysk	21900M	Vyborg Shipyard (Vyborg, Russia)	9692571	2016	In service		
	21900M2	Pella Sietas (Hamburg, Germany)	9901374	2023 (planned)	Construction stopped as of 2021		
Vyborg	21900M2	Vyborg Shipyard (Vyborg, Russia)	1022421	2025 (planned); 2028 (current estimate)	Under construction		
