= Sankt-Peterburg (icebreaker) =

Russian icebreaker

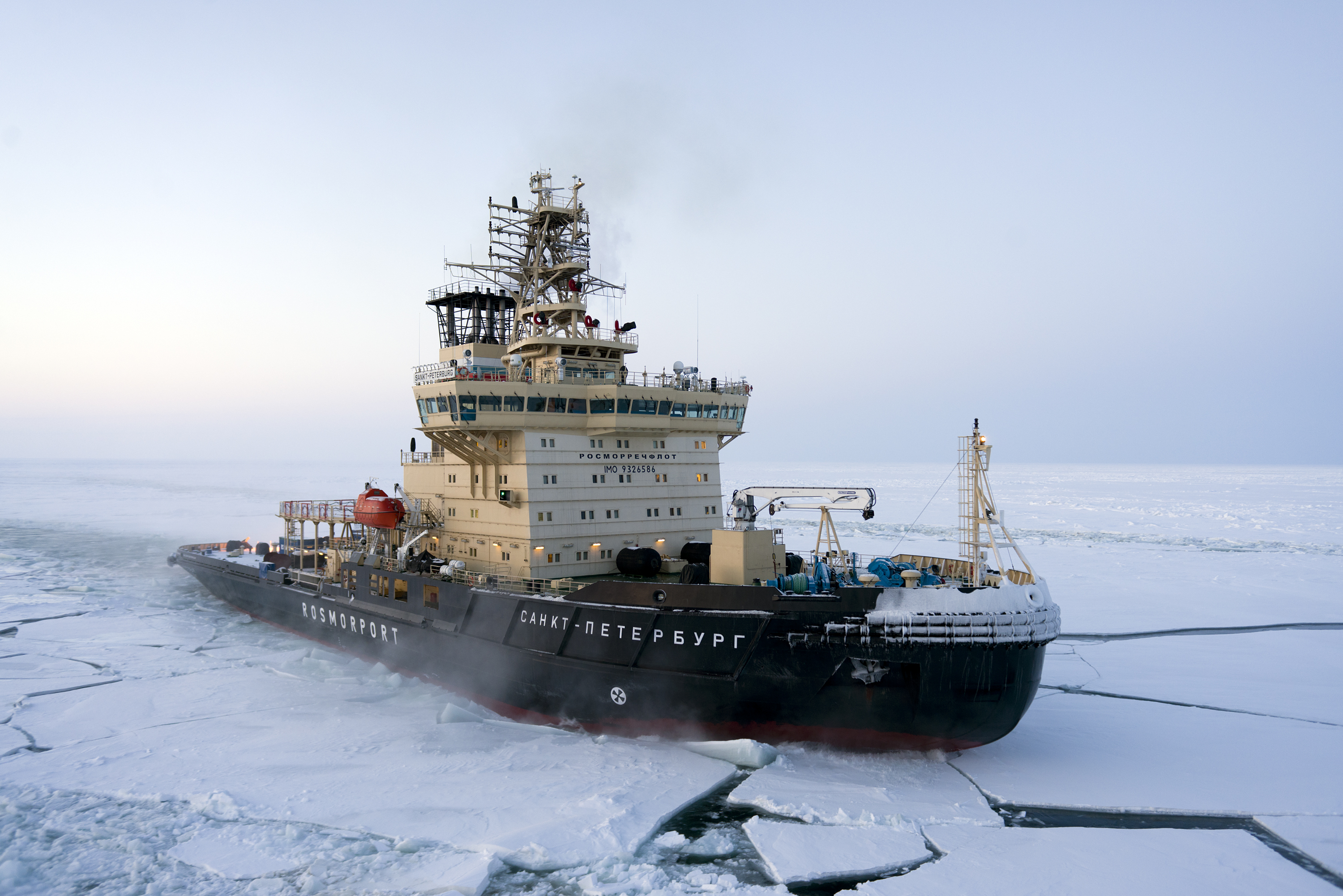
- Sankt-Peterburg, the second icebreaker of the series, in Kara Sea in 2015

History

Russia
- Name: Sankt-Peterburg (Санкт-Петербург)
- Namesake: Saint Petersburg
- Owner: Rosmorport
- Port of registry: Saint Petersburg
- Ordered: May 2005
- Builder: Baltic Shipyard (Saint Petersburg, Russia)
- Cost: $75 million
- Yard number: 05602
- Laid down: 19 January 2006
- Launched: 28 May 2008
- Completed: 12 July 2009
- Identification: IMO number: 9326586; MMSI number: 273334710; Call sign: UBHF6
- Status: In service

General characteristics
- Class & type: Project 21900 icebreaker
- Tonnage: 9,491 GT; 2,847 NT; 7,107 DWT
- Displacement: 14,300 t (14,100 long tons)
- Length: 114 m (374 ft)
- Beam: 27.5 m (90 ft)
- Draught: 8.5 m (28 ft)
- Depth: 12.40 m (41 ft)
- Ice class: RS Icebreaker6
- Installed power: 2 × Wärtsilä 9L32 (2 × 4,500 kW); 2 × Wärtsilä 12V32 (2 × 6,000 kW)
- Propulsion: Diesel-electric; two Steerprop SPO 4.5 ARC azimuth thrusters (2 × 8,200 kW)
- Speed: 16 knots (30 km/h; 18 mph) in open water; 3 knots (5.6 km/h; 3.5 mph) in 1 m (3.3 ft) ice
- Crew: 25
- Aviation facilities: Helideck for Ka-32 and Ka-226

Sankt-Peterburg (Russian: Санкт-Петербург; literally: Saint Petersburg) is a Russian diesel-electric icebreaker. She was built at Baltic Shipyard in 2009 as the second vessel for Project 21900, the first series of non-nuclear icebreakers built in Russia after the dissolution of the Soviet Union. She has an identical sister ship, the 2008-built Moskva.

Following the construction of Sankt-Peterburg, three icebreakers of slightly upgraded design (Vladivostok, Murmansk and Novorossiysk) were built in 2015–2016.

== Development and construction ==
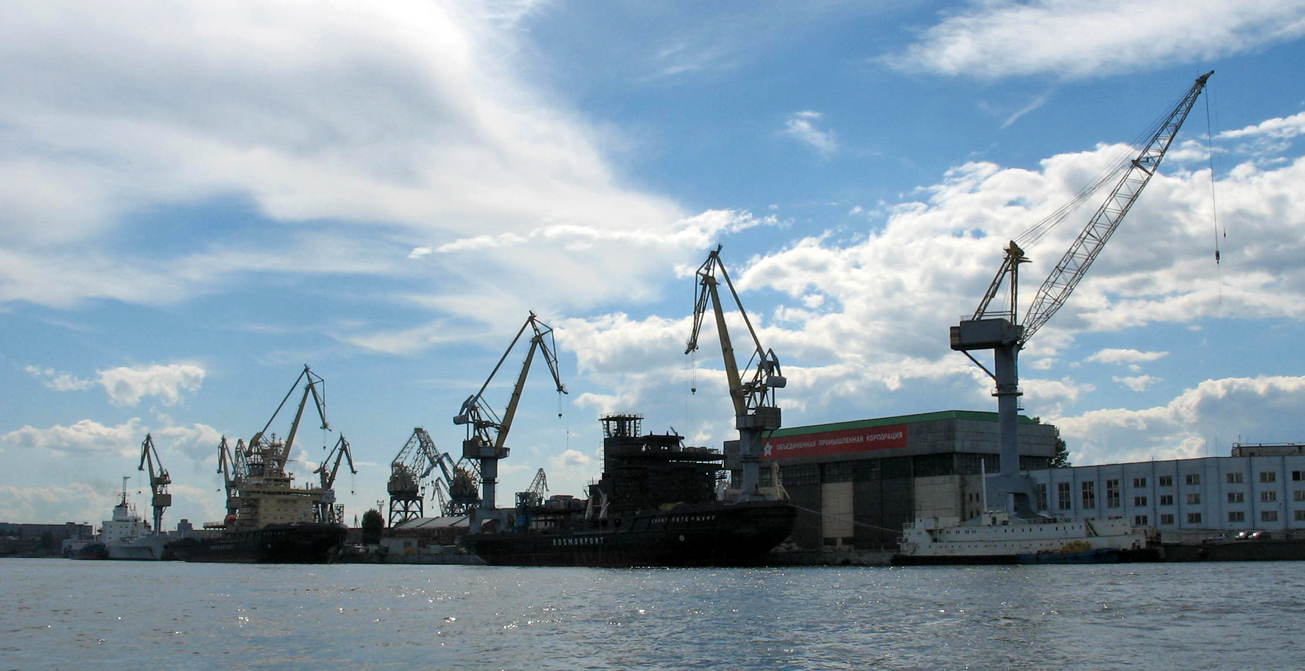
Moskva (left) and Sankt-Peterburg under construction in Saint Petersburg in 2008.

In July 2004, the Saint Petersburg-based Baltic Shipyard won an international tender for the construction of two 16-megawatt diesel-electric icebreakers for Rosmorport, a state-owned company established in 2003 to manage Russia's port infrastructure and operate its fleet of diesel-powered icebreakers. Although the shipyard had built five Arktika-class nuclear-powered icebreakers in 1975–1992 and had the sixth under construction at the time, these would be the first non-nuclear icebreakers built on a Russian shipyard in over three decades and the first new icebreakers ordered following the dissolution of the Soviet Union.

The contract for the construction of the second Project 21900 icebreaker was signed in May 2005 shortly after the lead ship was laid down at Baltic Shipyard. Initially, she was supposed to be delivered in November 2007, one year after the first vessel of the series. The keel laying ceremony was held on 19 January 2006 and the hull was launched on 28 May 2008. While delivery was initially scheduled for late 2008, she was officially commissioned on 12 July 2009.

Project 21900 icebreakers are named after major Russian cities with Sankt-Peterburg named after the country's second-largest city. While the naming of the vessels also follows that of a series of five diesel-electric polar icebreakers built by Wärtsilä in the 1960s, Sankt-Peterburg's Soviet-era counterpart was naturally named Leningrad.

== Design ==
Sankt-Peterburg is 114 metres (374 ft) long overall and 103.68 metres (340 ft) between perpendiculars, and has a moulded beam of 27.5 metres (90 ft). Fully laden, the 14,300-tonne (14,100-long-ton) icebreaker draws 8.5 metres (28 ft) of water. She is strengthened for icebreaking according to Russian Maritime Register of Shipping ice class Icebreaker6 which is intended for icebreaking operations in non-Arctic freezing seas where the ice is up to 1.5 metres (5 ft) thick.

Sankt-Peterburg has a fully integrated diesel-electric propulsion system with main diesel generators supplying power for both main propulsion as well as ship's service loads while underway. Her main power plant consists of two 4,500-kilowatt (6,000 hp) 9-cylinder Wärtsilä 9L32 and two 6,000-kilowatt (8,000 hp) 12-cylinder Wärtsilä 12V32 medium-speed diesel engines. In addition, there are two 670-kilowatt (900 hp) Wärtsilä 4L20 auxiliary diesel generators for use when the vessel is at port.

For main propulsion, Sankt-Peterburg is fitted with two electrically driven azimuth thrusters. The 4.5-metre (15 ft) stainless steel propellers of her pushing-type Steerprop SPO 4.5 ARC Z-drive units are each driven by two 4,100 kW (5,500 hp) electric motors in tandem, resulting in a combined propulsion power output of about 16 megawatts (21,000 hp). This is enough to give Sankt-Peterburg a service speed of 16 knots (30 km/h; 18 mph) in open water and allow breaking 1-metre (3.3 ft) level ice with a 10-to-20-centimetre (4 to 8 in) snow cover at a continuous speed of 3 knots (5.6 km/h; 3.5 mph) in line with her ice class. While the azimuthing propulsion units improve the maneuverability of the icebreaker, she is also fitted with a single transverse bow thruster.

== Career ==
The two Project 21900 icebreakers were originally built to ensure year-round transportation of crude oil from the terminal in Primorsk. Sankt-Peterburg's primary mission was to escort oil tankers up to 50 metres (164 ft) in breadth in the Gulf of Finland. In addition, she was designed to carry out various secondary tasks such as firefighting and oil spill response operations. Since 2015, Sankt-Peterburg has occasionally been stationed in the Arctic LNG terminal of Sabetta in the Gulf of Ob during the winter months.

Sankt-Peterburg has also regularly participated in the annual Festival of Icebreakers in Saint Petersburg. The icebreaker has been open to visitors in every festival since 2014 except 2015 when she was replaced by her sister ship Moskva. In July 2012, she visited France and was open to visitors as part of the maritime festival in Brest.
