= Moskva (2007 icebreaker) =

Russian icebreaker

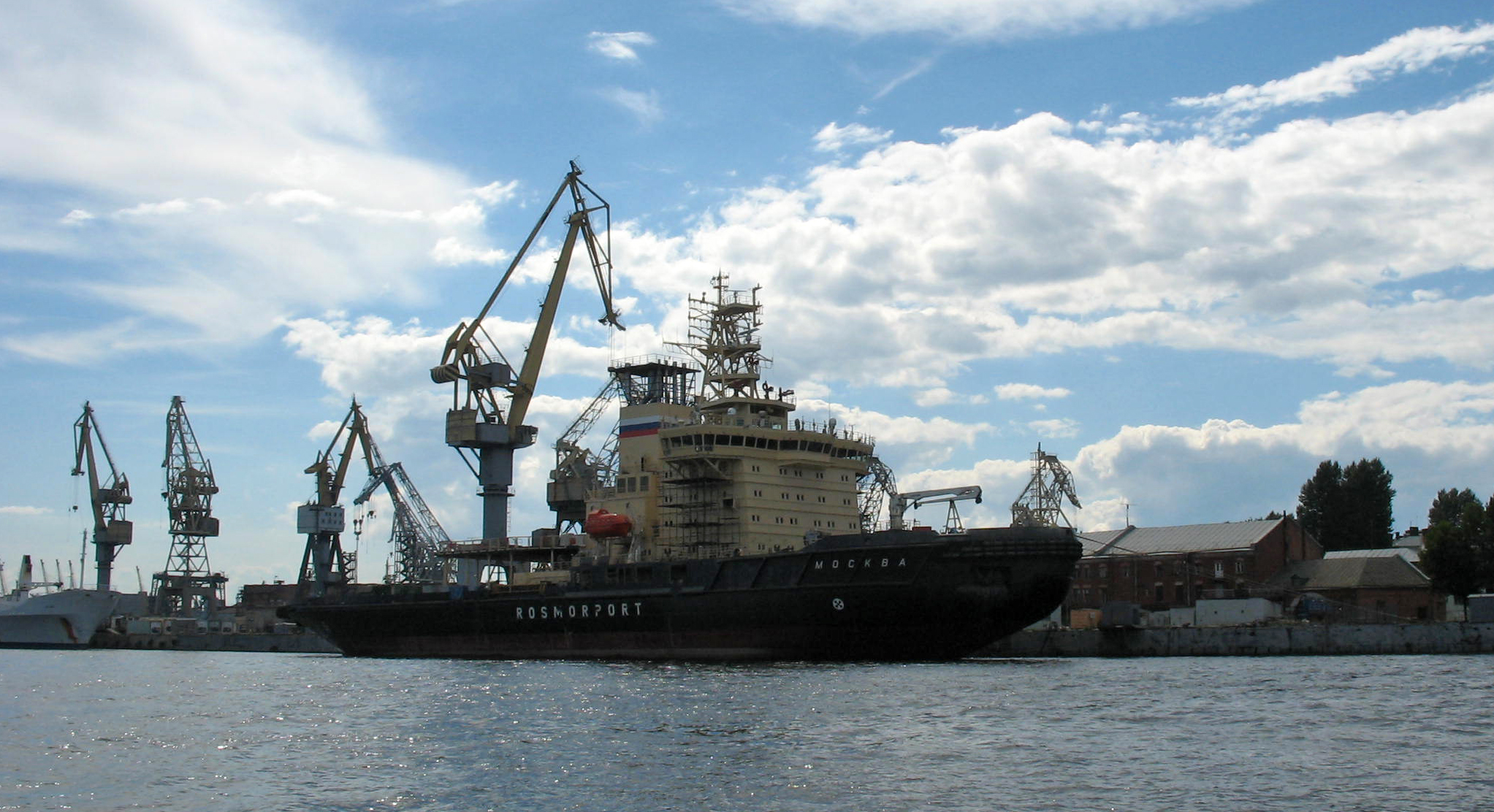
- Moskva under construction in Saint Petersburg in July 2008

History

Russia
- Name: Moskva (Москва)
- Namesake: Moscow
- Owner: Rosmorport
- Port of registry: Saint Petersburg
- Ordered: December 2004
- Builder: Baltic Shipyard (Saint Petersburg, Russia)
- Cost: $75 million
- Yard number: 05601
- Laid down: 19 May 2005
- Launched: 25 May 2007
- Completed: 11 December 2008
- Identification: IMO number: 9326574; MMSI number: 273341120; Call sign: UBVE4
- Status: In service

General characteristics
- Class & type: Project 21900 icebreaker
- Tonnage: 9,491 GT; 2,847 NT; 7,243 DWT
- Displacement: 14,300 t (14,100 long tons)
- Length: 114 m (374 ft)
- Beam: 27.5 m (90 ft)
- Draught: 8.5 m (28 ft)
- Depth: 12.40 m (41 ft)
- Ice class: RS Icebreaker6
- Installed power: 2 × Wärtsilä 9L32 (2 × 4,500 kW); 2 × Wärtsilä 12V32 (2 × 6,000 kW)
- Propulsion: Diesel-electric; two Steerprop SPO 4.5 ARC azimuth thrusters (2 × 8,200 kW)
- Speed: 16 knots (30 km/h; 18 mph) in open water; 3 knots (5.6 km/h; 3.5 mph) in 1 m (3.3 ft) ice
- Crew: 25
- Aviation facilities: Helideck for Ka-32 and Ka-226

Moskva (Russian: Москва; literally: Moscow) is a Russian Project 21900 diesel-electric icebreaker. Built at Baltic Shipyard in 2008, she was the first non-nuclear-powered icebreaker built in Russia after the dissolution of the Soviet Union.

Moskva has an identical sister ship, Sankt-Peterburg, built in 2009. In addition, three icebreakers of slightly upgraded design (Vladivostok, Murmansk and Novorossiysk) were built in 2015–2016.

== Development and construction ==
In July 2004, the Saint Petersburg-based Baltic Shipyard won an international tender for the construction of two 16-megawatt diesel-electric icebreakers for Rosmorport, a state-owned company established in 2003 to manage Russia's port infrastructure and operate its fleet of diesel-powered icebreakers. Although the shipyard had built five Arktika-class nuclear-powered icebreakers in 1975–1992 and had the sixth under construction at the time, these would be the first non-nuclear icebreakers built on a Russian shipyard in over three decades and the first new icebreakers ordered following the dissolution of the Soviet Union. While the state budget did not initially allocate funding for the new icebreakers, the construction was nonetheless set to begin already in 2004 and the lead ship was to be delivered by November 2006.

The keel laying ceremony of the first vessel was held on 19 May 2005 and the hull was launched on 25 May 2007, slightly behind the original schedule. At the time, technical readiness of the vessel was estimated to be 70 % and the delivery was still expected by the end of the year. However, it took more than a year before the first new diesel-electric icebreaker was finally delivered to Rosmorport on 11 December 2008.

Project 21900 icebreakers are named after major Russian cities with the lead ship, Moskva, named after the capital city of Russia. Previously, the same names were used for a series of five Soviet-era diesel-electric polar icebreakers built by Wärtsilä in the 1960s; the previous Moskva was in service in 1960–1992.

== Design ==
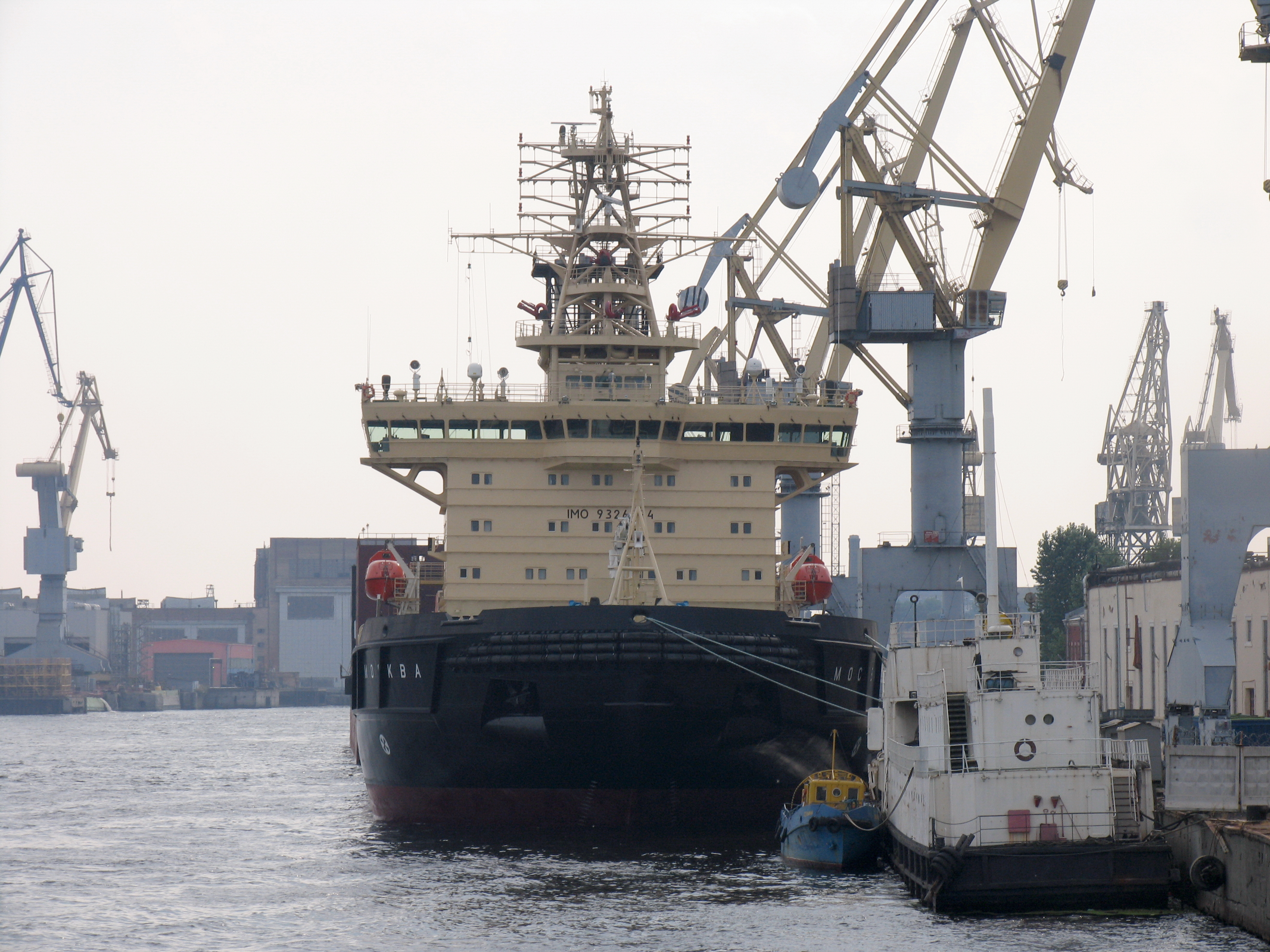
Moskva in Saint Petersburg in 2010.

Moskva is 114 metres (374 ft) long overall and 103.68 metres (340 ft) between perpendiculars, and has a moulded beam of 27.5 metres (90 ft). Fully laden, the 14,300-tonne (14,100-long-ton) icebreaker draws 8.5 metres (28 ft) of water. She is strengthened for icebreaking according to Russian Maritime Register of Shipping ice class Icebreaker6 which is intended for icebreaking operations in non-Arctic freezing seas where the ice is up to 1.5 metres (5 ft) thick.

Moskva has a fully integrated diesel-electric propulsion system with main diesel generators supplying power for both main propulsion as well as ship's service loads while underway. Her main power plant consists of two 4,500-kilowatt (6,000 hp) 9-cylinder Wärtsilä 9L32 and two 6,000-kilowatt (8,000 hp) 12-cylinder Wärtsilä 12V32 medium-speed diesel engines. In addition, there are two 670-kilowatt (900 hp) Wärtsilä 4L20 auxiliary diesel generators for use when the vessel is at port.

For main propulsion, Moskva is fitted with two electrically driven azimuth thrusters. The 4.5-metre (15 ft) stainless steel propellers of her pushing-type Steerprop SPO 4.5 ARC Z-drive units are each driven by two 4,100 kW (5,500 hp) electric motors in tandem, resulting in a combined propulsion power output of about 16 megawatts (21,000 hp). This is enough to give Moskva a service speed of 16 knots (30 km/h; 18 mph) in open water and allow breaking 1-metre (3.3 ft) level ice with a 10-to-20-centimetre (4 to 8 in) snow cover at a continuous speed of 3 knots (5.6 km/h; 3.5 mph) in line with her ice class. While the azimuthing propulsion units improve the maneuverability of the icebreaker, she is also fitted with a single transverse bow thruster.

== Career ==
The two Project 21900 icebreakers were originally built to ensure year-round transportation of crude oil from the terminal in Primorsk. Moskva's primary mission was to escort oil tankers up to 50 metres (164 ft) in breadth in the Gulf of Finland. In addition, she was designed to carry out various secondary tasks such as firefighting and oil spill response operations.

Since 2016, Moskva has occasionally been stationed in the Arctic LNG terminal of Sabetta in the Gulf of Ob during the winter months.

Moskva has participated in the annual Festival of Icebreakers in Saint Petersburg once. The icebreaker was open to visitors in 2015.
