= Murmansk (2015 icebreaker) =

Russian icebreaker

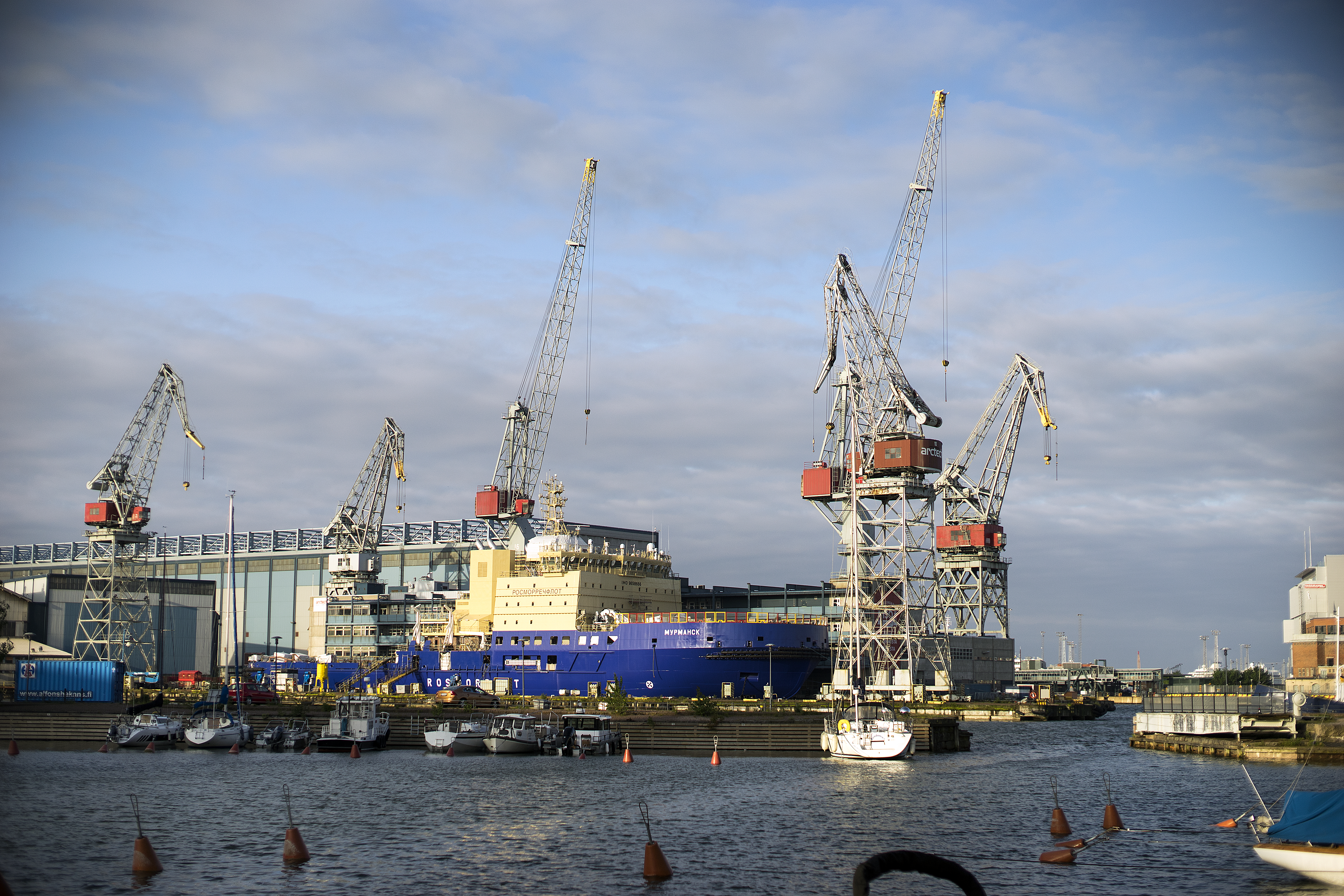
- Murmansk under construction in Helsinki, Finland, in June 2015

History

Russia
- Name: Murmansk (Мyрманск)
- Namesake: Murmansk
- Owner: Rosmorport
- Port of registry: Saint Petersburg
- Ordered: 23 February 2012 (Vyborg Shipyard); 18 December 2012 (Arctech Helsinki Shipyard)
- Builder: Arctech Helsinki Shipyard (Helsinki, Finland)
- Cost: About RUB 4 billion; About 100 million euro
- Yard number: 509
- Laid down: 26 December 2012
- Launched: 25 March 2015
- Sponsored by: Marina Kovtun
- Completed: 25 December 2015
- Identification: IMO number: 9658666; MMSI number: 273386110; Call sign: UBVN2
- Status: In service

General characteristics
- Class & type: Project 21900M icebreaker
- Tonnage: 11,720 GT; 3,516 NT; 5,048 DWT
- Displacement: 14,334 tonnes
- Length: 119.8 m (393 ft)
- Beam: 27.5 m (90 ft)
- Draught: 8.5 m (28 ft)
- Depth: 12.40 m (41 ft)
- Ice class: RS Icebreaker6
- Installed power: 4 × Wärtsilä 12V32E (4 × 6,960 kW)
- Propulsion: Diesel-electric; two Steerprop SP 110 ARC PULL azimuth thrusters (2 × 9,000 kW)
- Speed: 17 knots (31 km/h; 20 mph) (open water); 3.5 knots (6.5 km/h; 4.0 mph) in 1 m (3.3 ft) ice
- Aviation facilities: Helideck for Mi-8

Murmansk (Russian: Мyрманск) is a Russian Project 21900M diesel-electric icebreaker. While her construction was contracted to Vyborg Shipyard in Russia, she was built at Arctech Helsinki Shipyard in Finland and delivered to Rosmorport in 2016.

Murmansk, which represents a further development of the icebreakers Moskva and Sankt-Peterburg, has two identical sister ships: Vladivostok and Novorossiysk.

== Development and construction ==
In the 2000s, Russia began renewing the state-owned icebreaker fleet that, at the time, consisted mainly of Soviet-era vessels dating back to the 1970s and 1980s. In July 2004, the Saint Petersburg-based Baltic Shipyard won an international tender for the construction of two 16-megawatt diesel-electric icebreakers for Rosmorport, a state-owned company established in 2003 to manage Russia's port infrastructure and operate its fleet of diesel-powered icebreakers. These icebreakers, Moskva (delivered in 2008) and Sankt-Peterburg (2009), were the first non-nuclear icebreaker built in Russia for over three decades and the first new icebreakers ordered following the dissolution of the Soviet Union.

In 2011, the Russian government decided to continue the fleet renewal within the framework of the federal program Development of the Transport System of Russia (2010–2020) with three additional 16-megawatt diesel-electric icebreakers. The construction of the first icebreaker awarded to Vyborg Shipyard on 2 December 2011. On 23 February 2012, the remaining two vessels were also contracted to Vyborg Shipyard which was acquired by the state-owned United Shipbuilding Corporation (USC) to solve the shipyard's financial problems.

The new icebreakers, referred to as Project 21900M, represent a further development of the original Project 21900 design. Modifications to the original design include, among smaller general improvements, a slightly different diesel-electric power plant configuration and more efficient pulling-type propulsion units where the propeller is facing forward. While Project 21900M vessels were still sometimes referred to as "16-megawatt icebreakers", their propulsion power was increased to 18 megawatts. Externally, the most apparent difference is the helideck which has been moved to the foredeck and enlarged for the bigger Mil Mi-8 helicopter.

Although the construction of the new icebreaker was awarded to Vyborg Shipyard, the Russian shipyard subcontracted the hull assembly, outfitting and commissioning of the vessel to Arctech Helsinki Shipyard. The contract with the Finnish shipyard, which at the time was a joint venture between USC and STX Finland (a subsidiary of STX Europe, which in turn was a subsidiary of the South Korean STX Offshore & Shipbuilding), was signed on 18 December 2012. The keel-laying ceremony was held in Vyborg already on 26 December, after which the blocks were transferred to Helsinki for hull assembly. The vessel was ceremonially launched on 25 March 2015 and floated out from the shipyard's covered dry dock few days later. On 18 December, after completing the sea trials that began in late November, the new icebreaker was delivered to Vyborg Shipyard where she was handed over to Rosmorport on 25 December 2015.

Like the preceding Project 21900 icebreakers, the new icebreakers are also named after major cities of Russia with Murmansk representing the largest city above the Arctic Circle. Previously, the same naming scheme was also used for a series of five diesel-electric polar icebreakers built by the Finnish shipbuilder Wärtsilä in the 1960s; the previous Murmansk was in service in 1968–1995.

== Design ==
Murmansk is 119.8 metres (393 ft) long overall and 104 metres (341 ft) between perpendiculars, and has a moulded beam of 27.5 metres (90 ft). Fully laden, the 14,334-tonne (14,108-long-ton) icebreaker draws 8.5 metres (28 ft) of water. While her official Russian Maritime Register of Shipping ice class is Icebreaker6, Murmansk's hull and propulsion units are strengthened to meet the requirements for Icebreaker7, a higher ice class intended for icebreaking operations in the Arctic.

Murmansk has a fully integrated diesel-electric propulsion system with main diesel generators supplying power for both main propulsion as well as ship's service loads while underway. Her main power plant consists of four 12-cylinder Wärtsilä 12V32E four-stroke medium-speed diesel engines rated at 6,960 kilowatts (9,330 hp) each. In addition, there are two 800-kilowatt (1,100 hp) Wärtsilä 4L20 auxiliary diesel generators for use when the vessel is at port and a 200-kilowatt (270 hp) emergency diesel generator.

For main propulsion, Murmansk is fitted with two electrically driven azimuth thrusters. Her two Steerprop SP 110 ARC PULL Z-drive units, each driven by two 4,500-kilowatt (6,000 hp) electric propulsion motors in tandem configuration, were the most powerful mechanical azimuth thrusters in the world at the time of delivery. With a total propulsion power of 18,000 kilowatts (24,000 hp), Murmansk can achieve a service speed of 17 knots (31 km/h; 20 mph) in open water and break up to 1.5 metres (4.9 ft) thick level ice with her bow and 1.3 metres (4.3 ft) with her stern. In addition, she has a transverse bow thruster for maneuvering.

== Career ==
Murmansk is based in Saint Petersburg and normally escorts merchant ships in the Gulf of Finland during the winter navigating season. However, in April 2016 the icebreaker sailed to the Arctic together with her sister vessel Vladivostok for full-scale ice trials.

Murmansk has also participated once in the annual Festival of Icebreakers in Saint Petersburg; the icebreaker was open to visitors in 2017.
