= Vladivostok (2014 icebreaker) =

Russian icebreaker

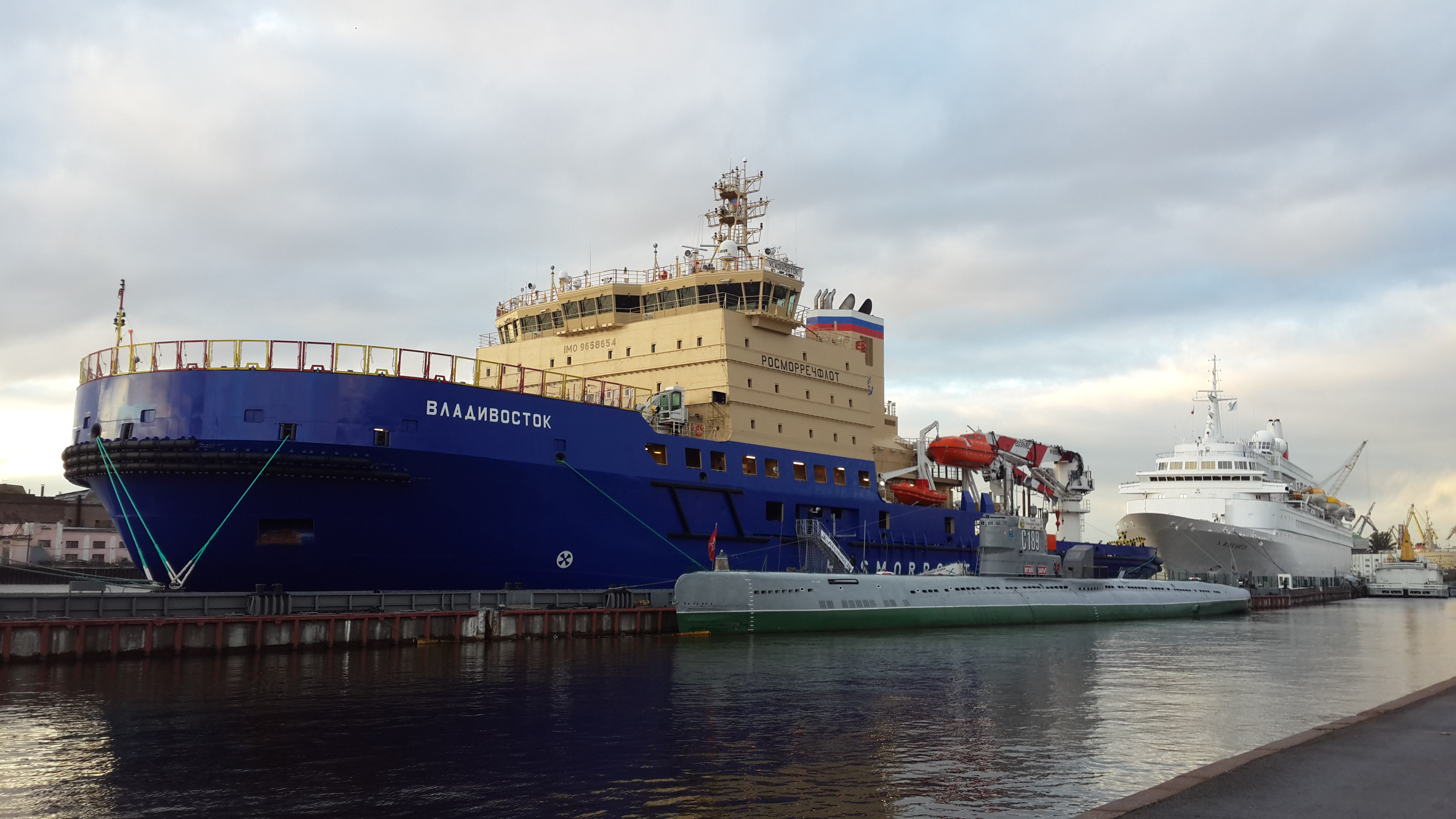
- Vladivostok in Saint Petersburg in October 2015

History

Russia
- Name: Vladivostok (Владивосток)
- Namesake: Vladivostok
- Owner: Rosmorport
- Port of registry: Saint Petersburg
- Ordered: 2 December 2011
- Builder: Vyborg Shipyard (Vyborg, Russia)
- Cost: About RUB 4 billion
- Yard number: 230
- Laid down: 17 October 2012
- Launched: 29 April 2014
- Sponsored by: Elena Shchegoleva
- Completed: 23 September 2015
- Identification: IMO number: 9658654; MMSI number: 273376280; Call sign: UFYH
- Status: In service

General characteristics
- Class & type: Project 21900M icebreaker
- Tonnage: 11,720 GT; 3,516 NT; 5,610 DWT
- Displacement: 14,334 t (14,108 long tons)
- Length: 119.8 m (393 ft)
- Beam: 27.5 m (90 ft)
- Draught: 8.5 m (28 ft)
- Depth: 12.40 m (41 ft)
- Ice class: RS Icebreaker6
- Installed power: 4 × Wärtsilä 12V32E (4 × 6,960 kW)
- Propulsion: Diesel-electric; two Steerprop SP 110 ARC PULL azimuth thrusters (2 × 9,000 kW)
- Speed: 17 knots (31 km/h; 20 mph) (open water); 3.5 knots (6.5 km/h; 4.0 mph) in 1 m (3.3 ft) ice
- Aviation facilities: Helideck for Mi-8

Vladivostok (Russian: Владивосток) is a Russian diesel-electric icebreaker and the lead ship of Project 21900M icebreakers. She was built by Vyborg Shipyard in Russia and delivered to Rosmorport in 2015.

Vladivostok, which represents a further development of the icebreakers Moskva and Sankt-Peterburg, has two identical sister ships: Murmansk and Novorossiysk.

== Development and construction ==
In the 2000s, Russia began renewing the state-owned icebreaker fleet that, at the time, consisted mainly of Soviet-era vessels dating back to the 1970s and 1980s. In July 2004, the Saint Petersburg-based Baltic Shipyard won an international tender for the construction of two 16-megawatt diesel-electric icebreakers for Rosmorport, a state-owned company established in 2003 to manage Russia's port infrastructure and operate its fleet of diesel-powered icebreakers. These icebreakers, Moskva (delivered in 2008) and Sankt-Peterburg (2009), were the first non-nuclear icebreaker built in Russia for over three decades and the first new icebreakers ordered following the dissolution of the Soviet Union.

In 2011, the Russian government decided to continue the fleet renewal within the framework of the federal program Development of the Transport System of Russia (2010–2020) with three additional 16-megawatt diesel-electric icebreakers. The construction of the first icebreaker awarded to the non-USC-affiliated Vyborg Shipyard on 2 December 2011. On 23 February 2012, the remaining two vessels were also contracted to Vyborg Shipyard which was acquired by the state-owned United Shipbuilding Corporation (USC) to solve the shipyard's financial problems.

The new icebreakers, referred to as Project 21900M, represent a further development of the original Project 21900 design. Modifications to the original design include, among smaller general improvements, a slightly different diesel-electric power plant configuration and more efficient pulling-type propulsion units where the propeller is facing forward. While Project 21900M vessels were still sometimes referred to as "16-megawatt icebreakers", their propulsion power was increased to 18 megawatts. Externally, the most apparent difference is the helideck which has been moved to the foredeck and enlarged for the bigger Mil Mi-8 helicopter.

The construction of the first Project 21900M icebreaker began at Vyborg Shipyard on 20 August 2012, a month ahead of schedule, and the keel laying ceremony was held on 17 October. Initially, the completed hull blocks were stored in the open while the shipyard was finalizing the construction of a semi-submersible barge Atlant that would be used for hull assembly and launching of the new icebreakers. The hull assembly began on 5 August 2013 and the vessel was launched on 29 April 2014. While the ceremonial flag raising was held in Saint Petersburg already on 23 September 2015, the acceptance certificate was not signed until 9 October when the icebreaker had successfully completed its sea trials.

Like the preceding Project 21900 icebreakers, the new icebreakers are also named after major cities of Russia with the lead ship Vladivostok representing the largest Russian port city on the Pacific coast. Previously, the same naming scheme was also used for a series of five diesel-electric polar icebreakers built by the Finnish shipbuilder Wärtsilä in the 1960s; the previous Vladivostok was in service in 1969–1992.

== Design ==
Vladivostok is 119.8 metres (393 ft) long overall and 104 metres (341 ft) between perpendiculars, and has a moulded beam of 27.5 metres (90 ft). Fully laden, the 14,334-tonne (14,108-long-ton) icebreaker draws 8.5 metres (28 ft) of water. While her official Russian Maritime Register of Shipping ice class is Icebreaker6, Vladivostok's hull and propulsion units are strengthened to meet the requirements for Icebreaker7, a higher ice class intended for icebreaking operations in the Arctic.

Vladivostok has a fully integrated diesel-electric propulsion system with main diesel generators supplying power for both main propulsion as well as ship's service loads while underway. Her main power plant consists of four 12-cylinder Wärtsilä 12V32E four-stroke medium-speed diesel engines rated at 6,960 kilowatts (9,330 hp) each. In addition, there are two 800-kilowatt (1,100 hp) Wärtsilä 4L20 auxiliary diesel generators for use when the vessel is at port and a 200-kilowatt (270 hp) emergency diesel generator.

For main propulsion, Vladivostok is fitted with two electrically driven azimuth thrusters. Her two Steerprop SP 110 ARC PULL Z-drive units, each driven by two 4,500-kilowatt (6,000 hp) electric propulsion motors in tandem configuration, were the most powerful mechanical azimuth thrusters in the world at the time of delivery. With a total propulsion power of 18,000 kilowatts (24,000 hp), Vladivostok can achieve a service speed of 17 knots (31 km/h; 20 mph) in open water and break up to 1.5 metres (4.9 ft) thick level ice with her bow and 1.3 metres (4.3 ft) with her stern. In addition, she has a transverse bow thruster for maneuvering.

== Career ==
Vladivostok is based in Saint Petersburg and normally escorts merchant ships in the Gulf of Finland during the winter navigating season. However, in April 2016 the icebreaker sailed to the Arctic together with her sister vessel Murmansk for full-scale ice trials. In the following years, Vladivostok returned to the Arctic: in 2017, she was stationed in Sabetta to provide icebreaking services for the Arctic LNG terminal and in the following year provided ice management services during offshore drilling in the Kara Sea.
