= Vympel Design Bureau =

Russian ship design company

Vympel Design Bureau (Russian: КБ «Вымпел») is a Russian ship design company based in Nizhny Novgorod.

== History ==
The company was established in 1927 as a branch of the Leningrad Maritime Shipbuilding Bureau. The company was granted the status of a self-sufficient organization under the name State Office of River and Sea Ships Design in 1930 and was renamed Central Design Bureau No. 51 in 1939. In 1966–1972, the company was known as Central Design Office "Volgobaltsudoproyekt" before receiving its current name.

== Recent projects ==
- Project 21900M icebreakers
  - Vladivostok
  - Murmansk
  - Novorossiysk
- Viktor Chernomyrdin (design modification)
- Ilya Muromets
