= Novorossiysk (icebreaker) =

Russian icebreaker

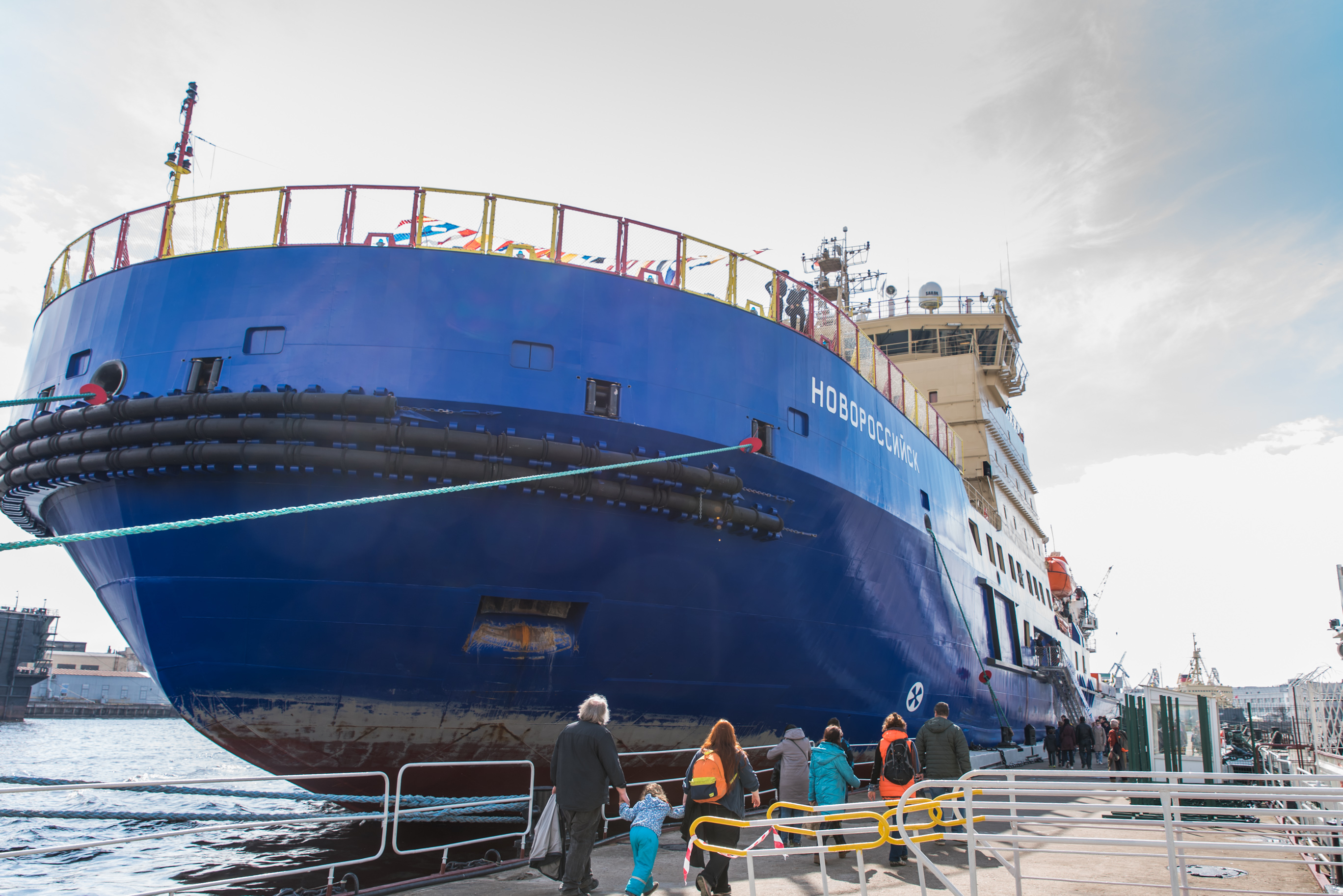
- Novorossiysk at the 5th Icebreaker Festival in Saint Petersburg in April 2018

History

Russia
- Name: Novorossiysk (Новороссийск)
- Namesake: Novorossiysk
- Owner: Rosmorport
- Port of registry: Saint Petersburg
- Ordered: 23 February 2012
- Builder: Vyborg Shipyard (Vyborg, Russia)
- Cost: About RUB 4 billion
- Yard number: 231
- Laid down: 12 December 2012
- Launched: 29 October 2015
- Sponsored by: Anzhelika Ryskova
- Completed: 26 December 2016
- Identification: IMO number: 9692571; MMSI number: 273389730; Call sign: UBLX
- Status: In service

General characteristics
- Class & type: Project 21900M icebreaker
- Tonnage: 11,720 GT; 3,516 NT; 5,142 DWT
- Displacement: 14,334 tonnes
- Length: 119.8 m (393 ft)
- Beam: 27.5 m (90 ft)
- Draught: 8.5 m (28 ft)
- Depth: 12.40 m (41 ft)
- Ice class: RS Icebreaker6
- Installed power: 4 × Wärtsilä 12V32E (4 × 6,960 kW)
- Propulsion: Diesel-electric; two Steerprop SP 110 ARC PULL azimuth thrusters (2 × 9,000 kW)
- Speed: 17 knots (31 km/h; 20 mph) (open water); 3.5 knots (6.5 km/h; 4.0 mph) in 1 m (3.3 ft) ice
- Aviation facilities: Helideck for Mi-8

Novorossiysk (Russian: Новороссийск) is a Russian Project 21900M diesel-electric icebreaker. She was built by Vyborg Shipyard in Russia and delivered to Rosmorport in 2016.

Novorossiysk, which represents a further development of the icebreakers Moskva and Sankt-Peterburg, has two identical sister ships: Vladivostok and Murmansk.

== Development and construction ==
In the 2000s, Russia began renewing the state-owned icebreaker fleet that, at the time, consisted mainly of Soviet-era vessels dating back to the 1970s and 1980s. In July 2004, the Saint Petersburg-based Baltic Shipyard won an international tender for the construction of two 16-megawatt diesel-electric icebreakers for Rosmorport, a state-owned company established in 2003 to manage Russia's port infrastructure and operate its fleet of diesel-powered icebreakers. These icebreakers, Moskva (delivered in 2008) and Sankt-Peterburg (2009), were the first non-nuclear icebreaker built in Russia for over three decades and the first new icebreakers ordered following the dissolution of the Soviet Union.

In 2011, the Russian government decided to continue the fleet renewal within the framework of the federal program Development of the Transport System of Russia (2010–2020) with three additional 16-megawatt diesel-electric icebreakers. The construction of the first icebreaker awarded to Vyborg Shipyard on 2 December 2011. On 23 February 2012, the remaining two vessels were also contracted to Vyborg Shipyard which was acquired by the state-owned United Shipbuilding Corporation (USC) to solve the shipyard's financial problems.

The new icebreakers, referred to as Project 21900M, represent a further development of the original Project 21900 design. Modifications to the original design include, among smaller general improvements, a slightly different diesel-electric power plant configuration and more efficient pulling-type propulsion units where the propeller is facing forward. While Project 21900M vessels were still sometimes referred to as "16-megawatt icebreakers", their propulsion power was increased to 18 megawatts. Externally, the most apparent difference is the helideck which has been moved to the foredeck and enlarged for the bigger Mil Mi-8 helicopter.

While the steel cutting for the second Project 21900M to be built by Vyborg Shipyard was not set to begin until sometime 2013, the production began ahead of schedule and the keel laying ceremony was held on 12 December 2012. After the launching of the first icebreaker, Vladivostok, hull assembly of the sister vessel began on the shipyard's semi-submersible barge Atlant in May 2019. The unfinished vessel was launched on 29 October 2015 and delivered to Rosmorport on 26 December 2016.

Like the preceding Project 21900 icebreakers, the new icebreakers are also named after major cities of Russia with Novorossiysk representing the main Russian port city on the Black Sea. While a similar naming scheme was also used for a series of five diesel-electric polar icebreakers built by the Finnish shipbuilder Wärtsilä in the 1960s, Novorossiysk's 1965-built Soviet-era counterpart, Kiev, was named the city that became the capital city of Ukraine following the dissolution of the Soviet Union.

== Design ==
Novorossiysk is 119.8 metres (393 ft) long overall and 104 metres (341 ft) between perpendiculars, and has a moulded beam of 27.5 metres (90 ft). Fully laden, the 14,334-tonne (14,108-long-ton) icebreaker draws 8.5 metres (28 ft) of water. While her official Russian Maritime Register of Shipping ice class is Icebreaker6, Novorossiysk's hull and propulsion units are strengthened to meet the requirements for Icebreaker7, a higher ice class intended for icebreaking operations in the Arctic.

Novorossiysk has a fully integrated diesel-electric propulsion system with main diesel generators supplying power for both main propulsion as well as ship's service loads while underway. Her main power plant consists of four 12-cylinder Wärtsilä 12V32E four-stroke medium-speed diesel engines rated at 6,960 kilowatts (9,330 hp) each. In addition, there are two 800-kilowatt (1,100 hp) Wärtsilä 4L20 auxiliary diesel generators for use when the vessel is at port and a 200-kilowatt (270 hp) emergency diesel generator.

For main propulsion, Novorossiysk is fitted with two electrically driven azimuth thrusters. Her two Steerprop SP 110 ARC PULL Z-drive units, each driven by two 4,500-kilowatt (6,000 hp) electric propulsion motors in tandem configuration, were the most powerful mechanical azimuth thrusters in the world at the time of delivery. With a total propulsion power of 18,000 kilowatts (24,000 hp), Novorossiysk can achieve a service speed of 17 knots (31 km/h; 20 mph) in open water and break up to 1.5 metres (4.9 ft) thick level ice with her bow and 1.3 metres (4.3 ft) with her stern. In addition, she has a transverse bow thruster for maneuvering.

== Career ==
Unlike the other Project 21900M icebreakers, Novorossiysk has been operating primarily in the Arctic and in the Russian far east. In January 2017, the vessel's debut voyage to the high latitudes took her to Franz Josef Land and for the rest of the icebreaking season she provided icebreaking services in the White Sea. In 2018, she supported offshore drilling operations in the Kara Sea with ice management. After having been stationed in the Far East Basin during the 2018–2019 icebreaking season, Novorossiysk was deployed to Pevek until 31 October 2019. In August, she began escorting the cruise ship Silver Explorer along the Northern Sea Route.

Novorossiysk has also participated once in the annual Festival of Icebreakers in Saint Petersburg; the icebreaker was open to visitors in 2018.
