= Vyborg Shipyard =

Russian shipbuilding company

Vyborg Shipyard PJSC
- Traded as: MCX: VSYD
- Industry: Shipbuilding
- Founded: November 12, 1948
- Headquarters: Vyborg, Russia
- Products: Icebreakers, Arctic offshore vessels, oil platforms, trawlers
- Revenue: $202 million (2017)
- Operating income: $5.07 million (2017)
- Net income: $2.17 million (2017)
- Total assets: $128 million (2017)
- Total equity: −$47.9 million (2017)
- Owner: United Shipbuilding Corporation
- Number of employees: approx. 15,000
- Website: vyborgshipyard.ru/en/

Vyborg Shipyard PJSC (Russian: ПАО «Выборгский судостроительный завод») is a shipbuilding company located in Vyborg, Russia. The company has a focus on icebreakers and other icegoing vessels for arctic conditions, but the company has also built deep sea semi-submersible floating drilling and production platforms for exploration of oil and gas offshore fields. Vyborg Shipyard employs more than 1,500 people.

== History ==
The shipyard was founded in 1948 and since then has built more than 200 different vessels with deadweight up to 12,000 tons. The total displacement of the built vessels is over 1,550,000 tons. At present the shipyard is able to build different type of vessels with deadweight up to 15,000 tons. When the shipyard builds bigger ships the hulls of the ships will be assembled at the semi-submersible barge Atlant built at the Vyborg shipyard specially for implementation of the Project 21900M icebreaker order. To launch the icebreaker the barge was towed to the deepwater area of the Vyborg Bay.

In January 1996, Kvaerner, also spelled Kværner, purchased a stake in the Vyborg Shipyard and renamed it Kverner-Vyborg Shipyard (Russian: ОАО «Квернер-Выборг Верфь») which employed 300 people and was the largest manufacturer of offshore installations in Russia. On 10 March 2000, Kvaerner sold the Vyborg Shipyard, which had 1500 employees but was losing money and faced closure during 1999, to the Sergey Zavyalov (Russian: Сергей Завьялов) associated early 1990s established Ako Barss Group (Russian: «Ако Барсс Груп») which then sold the shipyard to Rossiya Bank owners who placed the shipyard in the United Shipbuilding Corporation (USC). (Note: In 2015, Sergey Zavyalov (Russian: Сергей Завьялов), who is a graduate of the Leningrad Shipbuilding Institute (Russian: Ленинградский кораблестроительный институт) in the late 1980s and holds a 51% stake in Ako Barss Group (Russian: «Ако Барсс Груп») before 2007 when he became a top manager at Rosatom, heads the Directorate for the Construction and Operation of Floating Nuclear Thermal Power Plants - a branch of Rosenergoatom Concern OJSC (Russian: Дирекция по строительству и эксплуатации плавучих атомных тепловых электростанций — филиал ОАО «Концерн Росэнергоатом»). Since 1999, Zavyalov is a close advisor to Sergei Kiriyenko who headed Rosatom from 2005 to 2016.) Until 2022, Alexander Solovyov (Russian: Александр Соловьёв), an ex director of Ako Barss Group, owned the Vyborg Shipyard.

In 2012, Vyborg Shipyard joined the United Shipbuilding Corporation.

== Current projects and orders ==
On July 10, 2014, Vyborg Shipyard signed a subcontract with Arctech Helsinki Shipyard. According to the contract Vyborg Shipyard will fabricate sections and blocks for a platform supply vessel for Sovcomflot JSC built by Arctech Helsinki Shipyard. Design and equipment of the new vessel enable all-year-round transportation of personnel and supplies to the oil production platforms at Sakhalin-2 region and enhance their oil spill response and emergency evacuation capacity. The vessel is a further developed version in a series of two icebreaking supply vessels Aleksey Chirikov and Vitus Bering also built in co-operation between Arctech Helsinki Shipyard and Vyborg Shipyard. In summer 2014, Arctech and Vyborg Shipyard received an additional order of three icebreaking stand-by vessels of this class.

On April 30, 2015, Vyborg Shipyard signed contract for construction of a port icebreaker under Yamal LNG project for the port of Sabetta. The distinctive feature of the vessel is the propulsion system consisting of four azimuthing propulsion units with capacity of 3 MW each. The thrusters are located in pairs in bow and in stern that provides maximized operability in ice conditions, excellent maneuverability and performance of special operations in the water area of the Sabetta port where at the present moment LNG plant is under construction for Yamal LNG project. The icebreaker, named Ob, was laid down on 27 September 2016 (Russian: портовый ледокол проекта 30044, lit. 'Project 30044 port icebreaker').

In April 2015, Vyborg Shipyard signed contract which stipulated that two multi-purpose diesel-powered icebreaking support vessels 21.5 MW will be built at Vyborg Shipyard by the order of Gazprom Neft Novy Port. According to the contract both vessels will be delivered to the customer by 2018. Icebreaking support vessels will be operated on the Arctic terminal of the Novoportovskoye oilfield located in the west of the Gulf of Ob on the Yamal Peninsula. Design of the new vessels is based on the Aker ARC 130 A concept by Aker Arctic (Russian: ледокольное судно обеспечения проекта IBSV01, lit. 'Project IBSV01 icebreaking support vessel'). The first of two vessels ordered was laid down on November 3, 2015.

In September 2015 Rosmorport had submitted a proposal on extension of the series of Project 21900M icebreakers. The current order comprise three ships. Vyborg Shipyard has already completed one ship, Vladivostok, and has launched another ship, Novorossiysk. The third ship, Murmansk, was built by Arctech Helsinki Shipyard in Finland.

As of 2017, Vyborg Shipyard is also building a series of four vessels project KMT01 to Russian fishing companies, the contract worth was more than 11 billion roubles.

On February 4, 2021, the large-capacity processor-trawler project KMT01 vessel called Barentsevo More had its official flag-raising ceremony and left for fishing trials in the Barents Sea.

== Ships built or on order ==
Ship name	Owner	Year	Type	Yard number	IMO number	Status	Notes	Image	Ref
Vladivostok	Rosmorport	2015	Icebreaker	230	9658654	In service	Project 21900M icebreaker		
Novorossiysk	Rosmorport	2016	Icebreaker	231	9692571	In service	Project 21900M icebreaker; sister ship to Vladivostok		
Ob	Rosatomflot	2019	Port icebreaker	232	9843223	In service	Project 30044 icebreaker (Aker ARC 124 concept by Aker Arctic)		
Aleksandr Sannikov	Gazprom Neft	2018	Icebreaker	233	9777101	In service	Project IBSV01 icebreaking support vessel (Aker ARC 130 A concept by Aker Arctic)		
Andrey Vilkitsky	Gazprom Neft	2018	Icebreaker	234	9777113	In service	Project IBSV01 icebreaking support vessel; sister ship to Aleksandr Sannikov		
Purga	FSB Border Service	2024 (planned)	Border patrol ship	235	9916599	Under construction	Project 23550 patrol ship		
Dzerzhinsky	FSB Border Service		Border patrol ship	238		Under construction	Project 23550 patrol ship; sister ship to Purga		
	Rosmorport	2028 (planned)	Icebreaker	510		Under construction	Project 21900M2 icebreaker		
Barentsevo More	Arkhangelsk Trawl Fleet	2020	Trawler	935	9836153	In service	Project KMT01 freezer trawler		
Norvezhskoe More	Arkhangelsk Trawl Fleet	2021	Trawler	936	9836165	In service	Project KMT01 freezer trawler; sister ship to Barentsevo More		
Beloye More	Arkhangelsk Trawl Fleet	2023	Trawler	937	9836177	In service	Project KMT01 freezer trawler; sister ship to Barentsevo More		
Karskoye More	Arkhangelsk Trawl Fleet	2023 (planned)	Trawler	938	9836189	Under construction	Project KMT01 freezer trawler; sister ship to Barentsevo More		
Nord Pilgrim	Nord Pilgrim	2023 (planned)	Trawler	939	9836127	Under construction	Project KMT02.01 freezer trawler		
Leonid Gorbenko	Atlantrybflot JSC	2023 (planned)	Trawler	940	9836139	Under construction	Project KMT02.02 freezer trawler; sister ship to Dmitry Kozharskiy		
Bratya Laptevy	LKT Co Ltd	2023 (planned)	Trawler	949	9836206	Under construction	Project KMT02.03 freezer trawler		
Dmitry Kozharskiy	Atlantrybflot JSC	2023	Trawler	950	9836191	In service	Project KMT02.02 freezer trawler		
