= Pella Sietas =

Pella Sietas GmbH
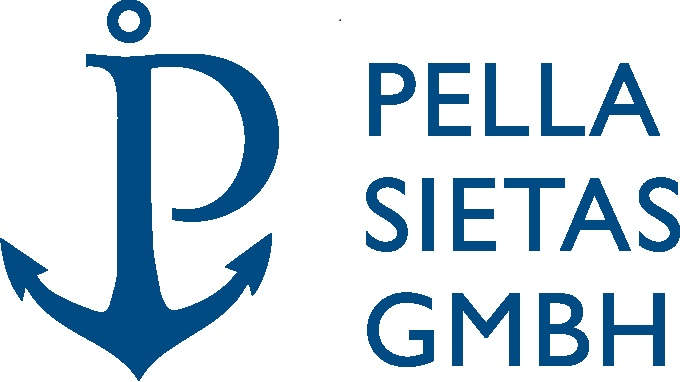
- Company type: Shipyard
- Industry: Shipbuilding
- Genre: Industry
- Predecessor: J.J Sietas KG Schiffswerft GmbH u. Co.
- Founded: 1635
- Founder: Carsten Sietasch
- Defunct: 2021
- Headquarters: Elbe, Neuenfelde, Germany, Cranz, Germany
- Number of locations: 1
- Area served: Hamburg
- Key people: Natalia Dean
- Products: Ship sections, new Ships
- Services: Ship Construction
- Owner: Garegin G. Tsaturov
- Number of employees: ~ 17
- Parent: Pella Shipyard
- Website: http://www.pellaship.ru/en/pella-segodnya

Pella Sietas was a shipbuilding company in Neuenfelde, Cranz, in southwest Hamburg. It was created from the insolvent firm of J.J Sietas KG Schiffswerft GmbH u. Co. It was located in the estuary of the Este river at Unterelbe. On 29 July 2021 the company filed for insolvency. The insolvency proceedings against the assets of the responsible shipyard were open. The Yard was bought in auction for € 20 million. According to the city's plans, the site intended to use the land for flood protection and to house refugees. It was stored turbines parts in the halls for a company.

== History ==
The oldest existing shipyard in Hamburg until November 2013, it was founded in 1635, making it one of the oldest companies in the city. From its inception, the company was continuously owned by the founding family, in the ninth generation by 2009. Wooden boats were built in the early years, later followed by brigs and other types of ships. In the early 20th century, production shifted from wood to steel vessels. From the 1950s, the shipyard focused on constructing ships in sections. In recent years, small to medium-sized container vessels were built.

After the shipyard experienced financial difficulties due to rising steel prices, the rapid fall in demand for container ships and miscalculation of costs, the shipyard's largest creditor, HSH Nordbank took over management in early March 2009, the first time the company was managed by someone outside of the founding family since 1635.

== Insolvency ==
After the global recession in 2009, container shipping demand fell sharply, and J.J. Sietas had to contend with numerous cancellations and a dwindling backlog, eventually turning away from container ship work and concentrating on specialty shipbuilding niches. These included heavy lift vessels, ferries, and offshore vessels. The last container ship was completed in November 2009. On November 6, 2009, the 393rd and last container ship, or feeder, was delivered. In December 2010, Sietas received an order for the first German-built offshore wind power transport and installation vessel, named Aeolus, which was completed in February 2014 for the Dutch Van Oord group. This ship was both the last and biggest ship built in the shipyard, before the takeover by the Russian Pella group in April 2014.

At November 17, 2011 due to excessive debts, an application for bankruptcy was made; insolvency proceedings were made on 1 February 2012. Following the proceedings, the Sietas shipyard was sold to Pella, Norderwerft was sold to Bremer Lürssen, and Neuenfelder Maschinenfabrik (NMF), which makes cranes, was approved for acquisition by the Norwegian TTS Group ASA.

In February 2014, the Sietas shipyard was property of the Terra Line GmbH in Hamburg, owned by the St. Petersburg-based Pella Shipyard. Under the agreement, the yard would continue to operate for at least eight years, and 120 employees were retained. The name of the shipyard company was changed after the takeover to Pella Sietas GmbH.

The first ship constructed entirely in the new shipyard was a small passenger ferry named Elbphilarmonie for Hadag Hamburg. In addition, repair services for Hamburg ferries and barges were developed. A second ferry named Kehrwieder was also completed in 2018. Since then, several ships' sections have been made for the Meyer shipyard in Papenburg for large cruise ships, and modular sections for a passenger ferry on Lake Constance.

The new administration filed for insolvency in July 2021, due to cash flow problems.

== Literature ==
- 375 Jahre Sietas Werft. In: Schiff & Hafen, Heft 10/2010, S. 21–90, Seehafen-Verlag, Hamburg 2010, ISSN 0938-1643
- Eckhard-Herbert Arndt: Neue Hoffnung für Traditionswerft. In: Hansa, Heft 1/2012, S. 24/25, Schiffahrts-Verlag Hansa, Hamburg 2012, ISSN 0017-7504
