= Straight-nine engine =

Piston engine with nine cylinders in a straight configuration

The straight-nine engine (also referred to as an inline-nine engine, abbreviated as I9 or L9) is a piston engine with nine cylinders arranged in a straight line along the crankshaft. The most common application is for large diesel engines used by ships.

Examples of straight-nine engines include:

- Rolls-Royce Bergen B, C and K series
- Wärtsilä RT-flex60C-B, RT-flex82C, RTA84T-D, RTA84C, RTA96C, 20, 26, 32, Wasa32LN, 38, 46 and 46F series
