= Yamal LNG =

Russian gaz joint venture

Coordinates: 71.2733°N 72.0725°E

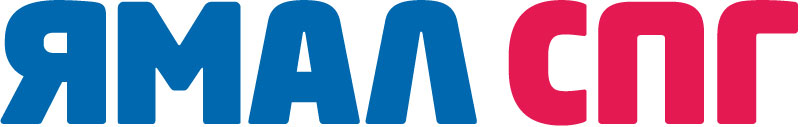

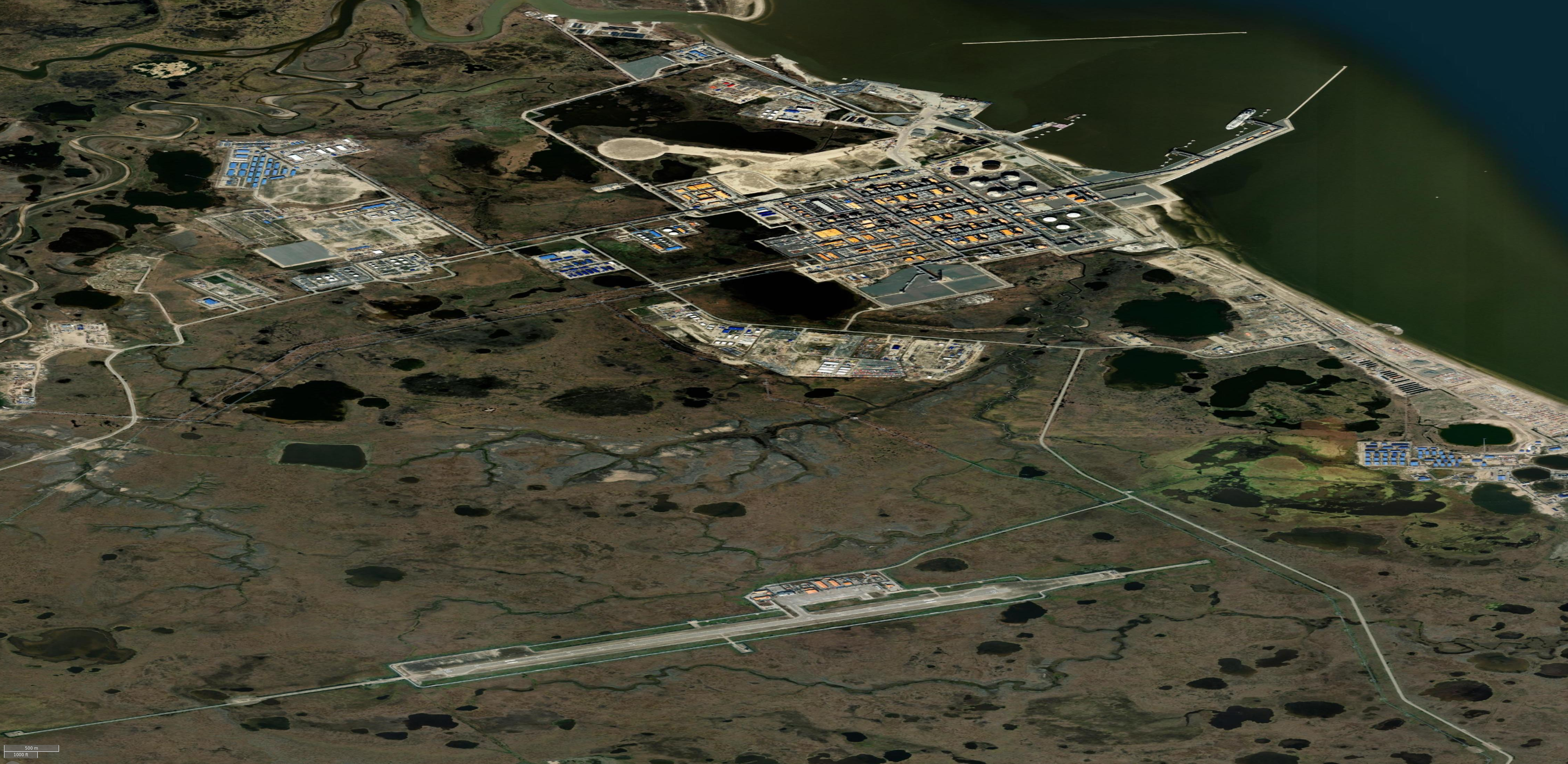
- Satellite imagery of Yamal LNG plant
- Type: Open joint-stock company
- Industry: Natural gas
- Founded: 2005
- Headquarters: Yar-Sale, Russia
- Revenue: $236 million (2017)
- Operating income: −$1.32 billion (2017)
- Net income: −$1.17 billion (2017)
- Total assets: $27.6 billion (2017)
- Total equity: −$1.61 billion (2017)

Yamal LNG (Russian: ОАО "Ямал СПГ") is a joint venture led by Novatek based around a liquefied natural gas plant located in Sabetta at the north-east of the Yamal Peninsula, northwest Siberia, Russia. In addition to the LNG plant, the project includes production at the Yuzhno-Tambeyskoye gas field, and the transport infrastructure, including the Sabetta seaport and airport.

== History ==
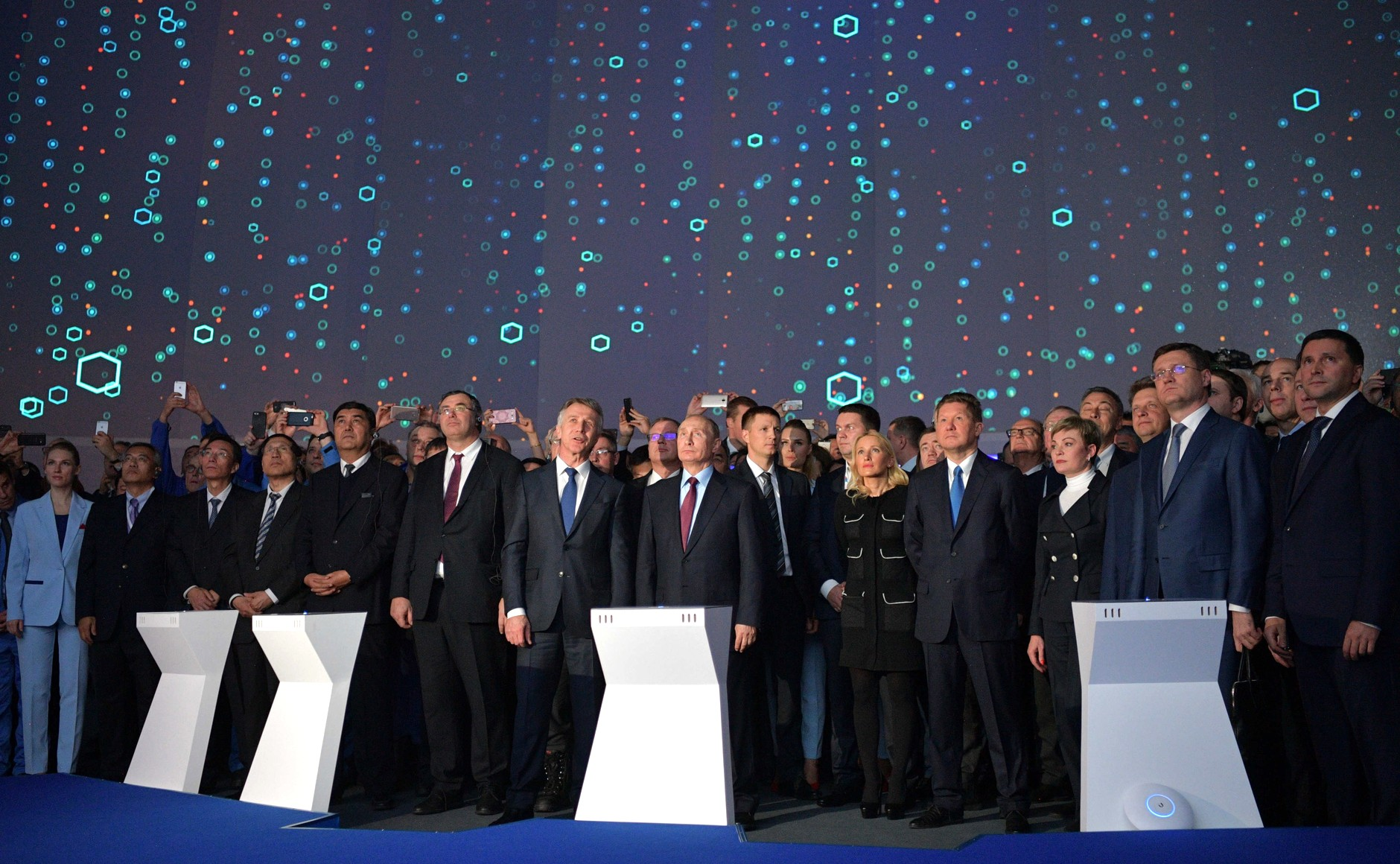
Ceremony of loading of the first LNG tanker within the project of Yamal LNG, 8 December 2017

Yamal LNG project was proposed when the company with the same name and controlled by Gennady Timchenko and Pyotr Kolbin got a license for the Yuzhno-Tambeyskoye gas field in 2005. Novatek took control of Yamal LNG in 2009. Another project named Yamal LNG was proposed by Gazprom. In November 2008, Gazprom announced that it prepared a list of potential partners for the LNG plant of the Yamal project. Although the list was not disclosed, Gazprom indicated that ExxonMobil and ConocoPhillips were included on the list. Also Royal Dutch Shell, Repsol YPF and Petro-Canada were mentioned as potential partners. In October 2010, the Novatek's project was chosen by the Russian government as a pilot project. The groundbreaking ceremony for the port construction was held in July 2012; however, construction of the port itself began in 2013.

As of 7 April 2014, the Yamal LNG OJSC is Novatek (60% stake), China's CNPC (20% stake) and France's Total (20% stake).

In December 2014, amid the 2014–15 Russian financial crisis, the Russian government gave a 150 billion rouble subsidy to the project.

The commercial operation of the port and first LNG train (LNG purification facility) were launched on 8 December 2017 by starting loading the first LNG carrier named after the late CEO of Total Christophe de Margerie. The loading was ceremonially launched by president Vladimir Putin in the presence of Saudi Arabia's energy minister Khalid al-Falih.

According to Novatek on 22 October 2019, the natural gas reserves in the Yamalo-Nenets Autonomous Okrug represent 80% of Russia's natural gas and 15% of the world's natural gas supply.

In 2021, Yamal LNG was ranked no. 30 among 120 oil, gas, and mining companies involved in resource extraction north of the Arctic Circle in the Arctic Environmental Responsibility Index (AERI). The plant is expected to produce a total of 926 billion cubic metres of liquefied natural gas from the South Tambey field and is considered by some to be the 'crown jewel' of the Northern Sea Route.

== Technical description ==
The project cost is US$27 billion.

The Yamal LNG plant will have three trains with total capacity of 16.5 million tonnes of liquefied natural gas per year when fully operational. The first train is operational at the end of 2017 and the full 3 train capacity is to be achieved by 2021. A second LNG Plant, named Artic LNG 2, is also proposed at a site to east near the Gyda Peninsula, across the river Ob estuary from Sabetta

The plant was designed and commissioned by consortium of Technip and JGC Corporation, and Chiyoda. In addition to the LNG plant, the project includes the construction of a seaport, airport and power plant. The power plant will be built by Technopromexport and its turbines will be supplied by Siemens. The power plant will have capacity of 380 MW(during ISO conditions) across its 8 turbines and it is to be operational by 2018. Construction of the port facilities started in September 2013.

The LNG plant is supplied from the Yuzhno-Tambeyskoye gas field. The main export market for LNG would be China. LNG would be shipped to Asian markets through the Northeast Passage. Daewoo Shipbuilding & Marine Engineering is contracted to build up to sixteen Arc7 ice-class double acting gas tankers for the project. Tankers will be chartered and operated by Sovcomflot.

A 180 km railway line is being built, connecting Bovanenkovo to Sabetta.

== Ownership ==
The project is developed by JSC Yamal LNG. Novatek owns 50.1% stake in the company while Total S.A. and CNPC own 20% each with China's Silk Road Fund has signed agreement to purchase 9.9% stake. General director of the company was Gleb Luxemburg and from September 2014 Evgeny Kot has been appointed the CEO of Yamal LNG.

=== Funding ===
Shareholders provided $10.5 billion the remaining coming as debt, with the Russian National Wealth Fund providing $2.6 billion, Russian banks $4 billion and Chinese banks $12 billion.

== Icebreaker LNG carriers ==
Yamal LNG leases 15 Yamalmax class LNG tanker ships to export its gas. Each tanker is designed to operate year-round from the Yamal peninsula and to break ice up to 2.1 meters thick. The ships are leased by Yamal LNG from four companies: Sovcomflot, one ship; MOL, three ships; Dynagas, five ships; and Teekay, six ships. The tankers were designed in Finland by Aker Arctic Technology Inc. and built at the Daewoo Shipbuilding & Marine Engineering (DSME) shipyard in South Korea.

The first icebreaker, Christophe de Margerie, traversed from Norway to South Korea across the Northern Sea Route in 19 days in August 2017.

When ice precludes shipping along the Northern Sea Route, then the Fluxys terminal at Zeebrugge, Belgium, will serve Russia as the LNG port for the Asia-Pacific region.

=== Ships ===
In service as of October 2019:

- Christophe de Margerie, Sovcomflot
- Boris Vilkitsky, Dynagas
- Fedor Litke, Dynagas
- Eduard Toll, Teekay
- Vladimir Rusanov (IMO 9750701), MOL
- Vladimir Vize, COSCO Shipping and MOL
- Rudolf Samoylovich, Teekay
- Nikolay Yevgenov (9750725), Teekay
- Georgiy Brusilov, Dynagas
- Boris Davydov, Dynagas
- Nikolay Zubov, Dynagas
- Vladimir Voronin, Teekay
- Nikolay Urvantsev, MOL
- Georgiy Ushakov, Teekay
- Yakov Gakkel, Teekay

The Arc7 fleet requires specialist maintenance because of the conditions in which it operates. In 2026, the Financial Times reported that the Fayard shipyard in Denmark was the only remaining EU yard servicing the vessels, after Damen Shiprepair Brest stopped accepting them. EU restrictions on maritime services for LNG vessels operating in Russia are due to take effect in January 2027.

== United States sanctions beginning September 2019 ==
Following the 14 September 2019 attack by Iran on Saudi Arabian oil fields at Khurais and Abqaiq (Biqayq in Arabic) during the 2019–2021 Persian Gulf crisis, the United States imposed sanctions under executive order 13846 against several companies including Cosco Shipping Tanker (Dalian) Seaman and Ship Management Company Ltd and the Cosco Shipping Tanker Dalian (大連中遠海運油品運輸有限公司) which are two Cosco Shipping Company subsidiaries that are supporting LNG shipments from Sabetta. As of late September 2019, the Joint Venture TC LNG between the Cosco Shipping Tanker Dalian company (50% stake) and the Canadian firm Teekay is the China LNG Shipping Ltd (CLNG) which has more than one third of Sabetta's LNG ice fleet, six ARC7 LNG tankers: Eduard Toll (Russian: «Эдуард Толль»), Rudolf Samoilovich (Russian: «Рудольф Самойлович»), Nikolay Evgenov (Russian: «Николай Евгенов»), Vladimir Voronin (Russian: «Владимир Воронин») all of which are operating, Georgy Ushakov (Russian: «Георгий Ушаков») which is going to Sabetta after sea trials, and Yakov Gakkel (Russian: «Яков Гаккель») which is under sea trials at a South Korean shipyard. Also affected are five ARC7 tankers which Dynagas will supply in a partnership between Sinotrans&CSC and CLNG (25.5% stake), as well as three ARC7 tankers from a joint venture between the Cosco subsidiary Shanghai LNG and Japan's MOL (株式会社商船三井). However, these former five and later three ARC7 tankers are not directly sanctioned but US Office of Foreign Assets Control (OFAC) rules require caution to be exercised in the former. Of the fifteen ARC7 tankers operating out of Sabetta, only Sovcomflot's Christophe de Margerie is not affected by the sanctions. Although these ships have been serviced at Honningsvåg, Norway, this will be phased out and future LNG tanker shipments along the Northern Sea Route may occur between Murmansk and Kamchatka in Russia coastal waters. On 30 January 2020, the United States lifted sanctions on Cosco Shipping Tanker (Dalian) and its TC LNG.

== Yamal LNG in the European gas market ==
In 2024 and 2025, Russia’s Yamal LNG project remained a major source of liquefied natural gas for the European Union, even as the EU pledged to ban Russian LNG imports by 2027. Shipments from Yamal LNG to EU terminals in 2025 totaled roughly 15 million tonnes – about one-seventh of the bloc’s total LNG imports, generating an estimated €7.2 billion in revenue for Russia, according to data from the NGO Urgewald. This volume was on par with 2024 levels and represented over 76% of Yamal’s global LNG exports in 2025 (up from ~75% in 2024).

In 2026, the escalation of conflict involving Iran and instability surrounding the Strait of Hormuz contributed to renewed European demand for Russian LNG exports, cushioning the impact of broader energy market disruptions.

== See also ==
- Liquefied natural gas industry in Russia
