= Ice class =

Ship classification

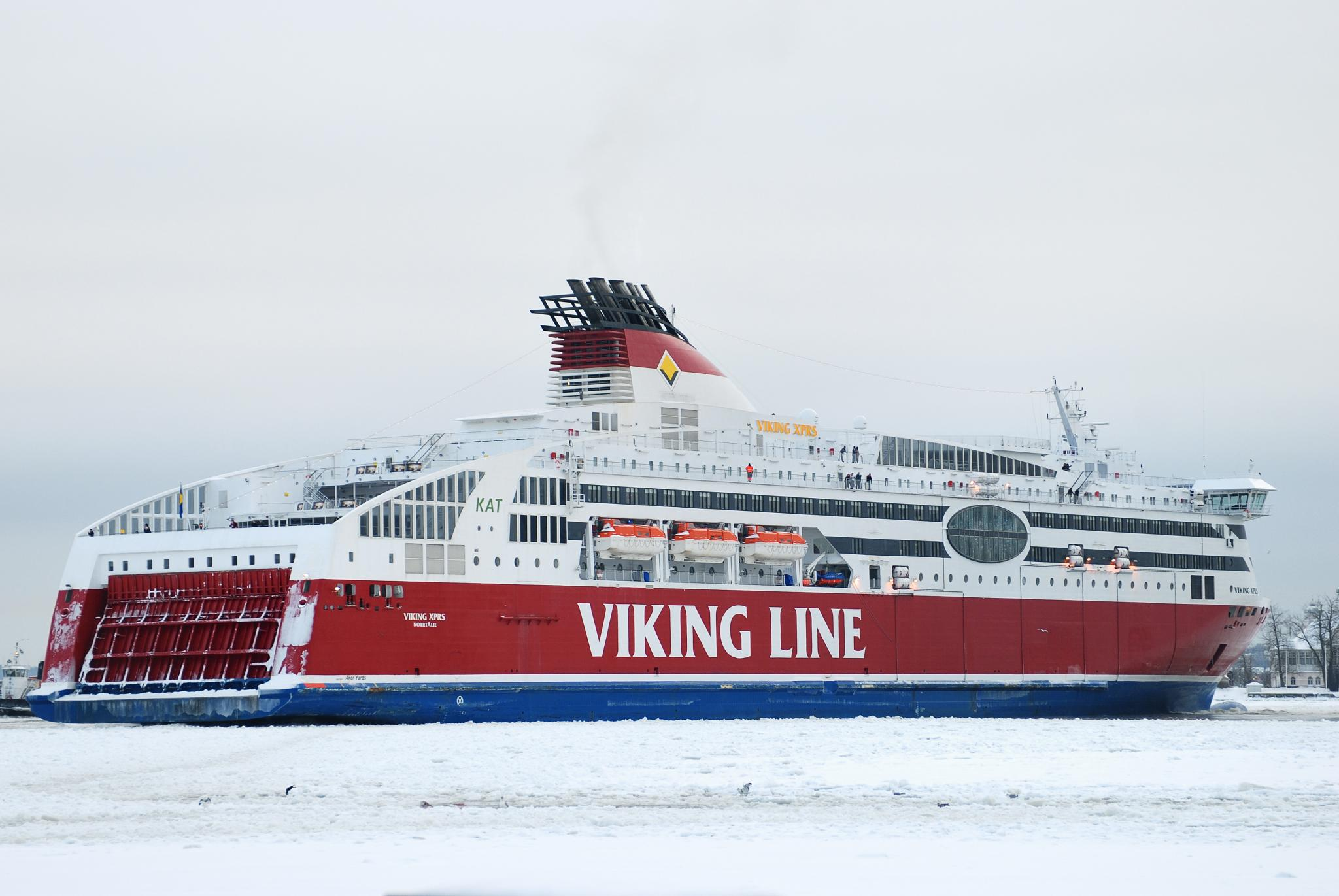
MS Viking XPRS, a ship in Finnish–Swedish ice class 1A Super, in Helsinki harbour during wintertime

Ice class refers to a notation assigned by a classification society or a national authority to denote the additional level of strengthening as well as other arrangements that enable a ship to navigate through sea ice. Some ice classes also have requirements for the ice-going performance of the vessel.

== Significance of ice class ==
Not all ships are built to an ice class. Building a ship to an ice class means that the hull must be thicker, and more scantlings must be in place. Sea chests may need to be arranged differently depending on the class. Sea bays may also be required to ensure that the sea chest does not become blocked with ice. Most of the stronger classes require several forms of rudder and propeller protection. Two rudder pintles are usually required, and strengthened propeller tips are often required in the stronger ice classes. More watertight bulkheads, in addition to those required by a ship's normal class, are usually required. In addition, heating arrangements for fuel tanks, ballast tanks, and other tanks vital to the ship's operation may also be required depending on the class.

== Different ice classes ==
=== IACS Polar Class ===
Ships can be assigned one of seven Polar Classes (PC) ranging from PC 1 for year-round operation in all polar waters to PC 7 for summer and autumn operation in thin first-year ice based on the Unified Requirements for Polar Class Ships developed by the International Association of Classification Societies (IACS). The IACS Polar Class rules were developed to harmonize the ice class rules between different classification societies and complement the IMO Guidelines for Ships Operating in Arctic Ice Covered Waters.

=== Finnish–Swedish ice class ===
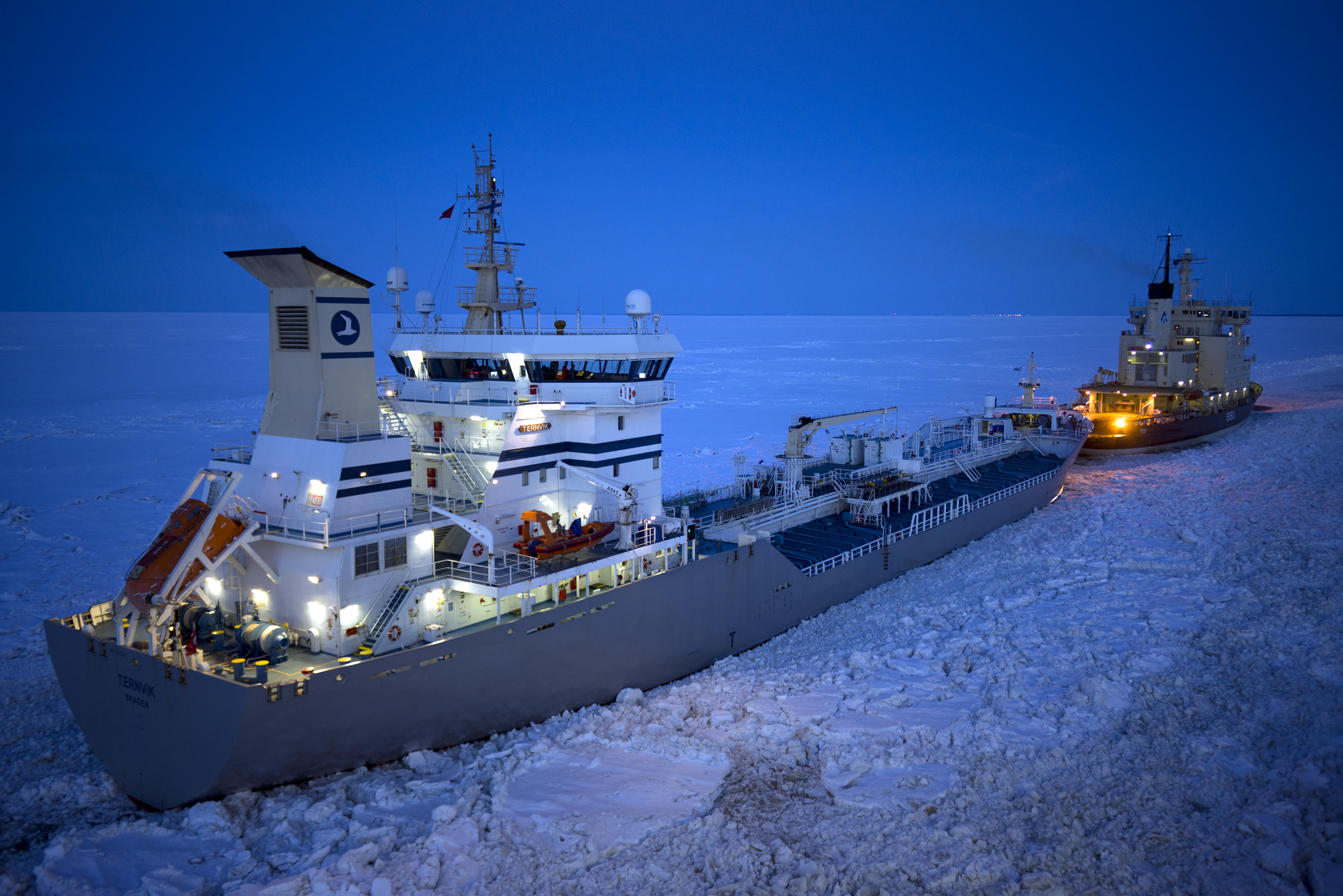
Product tanker Ternvik escorted to the port of Oulu by the Finnish icebreaker Sisu. During the winter months, ships calling Finnish or Swedish ports are given icebreaker escort based on their Finnish–Swedish ice class and traffic restrictions.

Traffic restrictions in the Baltic Sea during winter months are based on the Finnish–Swedish ice classes. These restrictions, imposed by the local maritime administrations, declare the minimum requirements for ships that are given icebreaker assistance, for example "ice class 1A, 2000 DWT".

In the Finnish–Swedish ice class rules, merchant ships operating in first-year ice in the Baltic Sea are divided into six ice classes based on requirements for hull structural design, engine output and performance in ice according to the regulations issued by the Swedish Maritime Administration and the Finnish Transport and Communications Agency (Traficom). International classification societies have incorporated the Finnish–Swedish ice class rules to their own rulebooks and offer equivalent ice class notations that are recognized by the Finnish and Swedish authorities.

Ships of the highest ice class, 1A Super, are designed to operate in difficult ice conditions mainly without icebreaker assistance while ships of lower ice classes 1A, 1B and 1C are assumed to rely on icebreaker assistance. In addition there are ice class 2 for steel-hulled ships with no ice strengthening that are capable of operating independently in very light ice conditions and class 3 for vessels that do not belong to any other class such as barges. In official context and legislation, the ice classes are usually spelled with Roman numerals, e.g. IA. Classification societies may sometimes use somewhat different distinguishing marks for Finnish–Swedish ice classes; for example, 1A Super is defined as Ice Class I AA by the American Bureau of Shipping (ABS) and ICE(1A*) by DNV GL.

=== Classification societies ===
==== American Bureau of Shipping ====
The American Bureau of Shipping has a system of ice classes which includes classes A5 through A0; B0, C0, and D0. A5 class is the strongest built of the classes, with D0 being the weakest. All other major classification societies have a similar system of ice classes, and converting between ice classes is relatively easy. In most cases only the names of the classes are changed and the specifics of the Arctic class are identical. ABS Class A5 is the only Arctic Class that may act independently in extreme Arctic waters with no limitations. Other classes are subject to limitations on time of year, required escort (always with a vessel of higher ice class) and ice conditions.

==== DNV ====
Prior to the adoption of Unified Requirements for Polar Class Ships, DNV (Det Norske Veritas until 2013; DNV GL in 2013–2021) maintained its own set of requirements for ships operating independently in freezing sub-Arctic, Arctic and Antarctic waters. Ships operating in first-year winter ice with pressure ridges could be assigned class notation ICE-05, -10, or -15 where the number indicated nominal ice thickness used for structural design; for example, 0.5 metres (20 in) for ICE-05. Vessels expected to encounter multi-year sea ice and glacial ice inclusions could be assigned more stringent requirements class notation with POLAR-10, -20, or -30. Finally, vessels intended for icebreaking as their main purpose could be assigned an additional class notation "Icebreaker" after the ice class, e.g. POLAR-10 Icebreaker.

Following the merger of Det Norske Veritas and Germanischer Lloyd in 2013, the old Det Norske Veritas ice class rules were superseded by new DNV GL ice classes.

==== DNV GL ====
DNV GL rules include requirements and additional class notations Ice(C) and Ice(E) for ships intended for service in waters with light ice conditions and localized drift ice, Ice(1C) through Ice(1A*) for vessels operating in northern Baltic Sea (corresponding to Finnish–Swedish ice classes 1C through 1A Super), an additional notation Ice(1A*F) for high-powered ships in regular traffic in heavy Baltic ice, and PC(1) through PC(7) for ships meeting the IACS Polar Class requirements. Ships engaged in icebreaking operations may be assigned an additional notation "Icebreaker" and ships designed to operate stern-first in ice an additional notation DAV.

DNV Class		Description
ICE-1A*	E4	First-year ice to 1.0 m
ICE-1A	E3	First-year ice to 0.8 m
ICE-1B	E2	First-year ice to 0.6 m
ICE-1C	E1	First-year ice to 0.4 m
ICE-C	E	Light ice conditions

==== Russian Maritime Register of Shipping ====
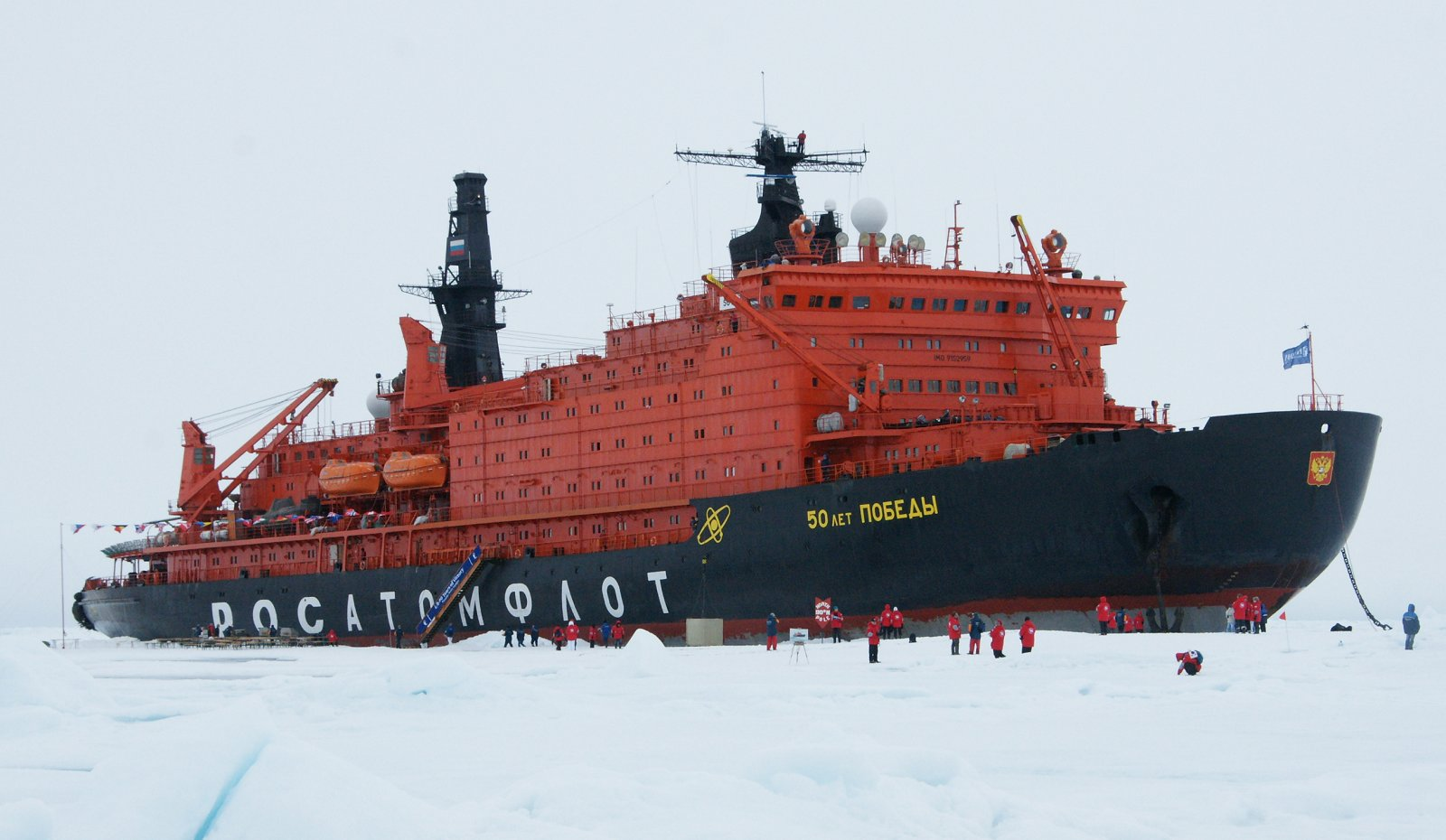
Russian nuclear icebreaker 50 Let Pobedy, class Icebreaker9

The Russian Maritime Register of Shipping (RS), established in 1913, has a long history of classing icebreakers and ice-strengthened vessels, and today maintains its own set of ice class rules for vessels navigating in freezing non-Arctic and Arctic seas. Out of about 5,000 vessels classified by the RS, over 3,200 are strengthened for navigation in ice and 300 of these have an ice class intended for operations in Arctic waters.

The RS ice class rules have been revised and the class notations changed several times over the years. As of 2017, the ice classes are divided to non-Arctic, Arctic and icebreaker classes. The ice class notation is followed by a number which denotes the level of ice strengthening: Ice1 to Ice3 for non-Arctic ships, Arc4 to Arc9 for Arctic ships, and Icebreaker6 to Icebreaker9 for icebreakers. These ice classes can be assigned in parallel with the Finnish–Swedish ice class and/or the IACS Polar Class, provided the vessel complies with all applicable rules. The selection of ice class is based on the operating area in the Russian Arctic, time of year, ice conditions, operating tactics, and whether the vessel operates under icebreaker escort or independently. In addition, icebreaker classes have additional requirements for minimum shaft power and icebreaking capability.

==== Lloyd's Register ====
Ice classification by Lloyd's Register based on Baltic Sea and Arctic Ocean conditions.

Class Range	Ice Class	First year ice thickness (Baltic)	First year ice thickness (Polar)
Lowest	1C	0.4 m	
	1B	0.6 m	
	1A	0.8 m	0.3–0.7 m
Highest	1AS	1.0 m	0.7–1.2 m

=== Canadian ice classes ===
==== Arctic Class ====
A class attributed to a vessel under the Canadian Arctic Shipping Pollution Prevention Regulations (CASPPR) regime, which indicates that the vessel met the requirements of those regulations. Up to December 2017, Canadian Arctic Shipping Pollution Prevention Regulations establish nine Arctic classes for ship (Arctic Class 1, 1A, 2, 3, 4, 6, 7, 8, or 10) based on requirements for hull structural design, engine power, engine cooling water arrangement, propeller, rudder and steering gear and performance in ice.

Ice Class index	Arctic Class	Description
Higher	10	
	8	
	7	Can maintain a speed of 3 knots through ice 7 feet thick
	6	
	4	Can maintain a speed of 3 knots through ice 4 feet thick
	3	Can maintain a speed of 3 knots through ice 3 feet thick
	2	
	1A	
Lower	1	

==== Canadian Arctic Class (CAC) ====
A class attributed to a vessel under the Canada Shipping Act regime, which indicates that the vessel met the requirements of the applicable standards of TP 12260 Equivalent Standards for the Construction of Arctic Class Ships, published by the Department of Transport, on December 1, 1995. This new system exists for determining how the most highly ice-strengthened vessels are classed by Transport Canada, Marine Safety. Four Canadian Arctic Classes (CAC) have now replaced the previous Arctic 1 - Arctic 10 Classes. Details of the new structural classifications are provided in the Transport Canada publication Equivalent Standards For The Construction Of Arctic Class Ships - TP 12260E; to summarize:

- CAC 1 is seen as an icebreaker which can operate anywhere in the Arctic and can proceed through Multi-Year ice continuously or by ramming according to the owner's performance requirements. A CAC 1 ship is capable of navigation in any ice regime found in the Canadian Arctic and unrestricted ramming of the heaviest ice features (except icebergs or similar ice formations) for the purpose of ice management.
- CAC 2 is seen as a commercial cargo carrying ship which can trade anywhere in the Arctic, but would take the easiest route. It could proceed through Multi-Year ice continuously or by ramming according to the owner's performance requirements. A CAC 2 ship is capable of navigation in any ice regime found in the Canadian Arctic and ramming of heavy ice feature restricted by its structural capability.
- CAC 3 is seen as commercial cargo carrying ship which can trade in the Arctic where ice regimes permit. It would proceed through Multi-Year ice only when it is unavoidable and would do so in a controlled manner usually by ramming. It would be unrestricted in Second and heavy First-Year ice.
- CAC 4 is seen as commercial cargo carrying ship which can trade in the Arctic where ice regimes permit. It would be capable of navigating in any thickness of First-Year ice found in the Canadian Arctic, including First-Year ridges. It would avoid Multi-Year ice and when this is not possible it would push or ram at very low speeds.

Vessels CAC 1, 2, 3, and 4 may also be considered suitable escorts, capable of escorting ships of lower classes. Canada has developed structural standards for each of these classes. Ships built to polar standards of other Classification Societies and national authorities can apply for CAC equivalency on a case-by-case basis, as can owners of vessels previously classified under the existing Canadian system for Arctic Class vessels.

Category		Equivalent Arctic Class
CAC 1	→	Arctic Class 10
CAC 2	→	Arctic Class 8
CAC 3	→	Arctic Class 6
CAC 4	→	Arctic Class 3

Note: The CAC categories are equivalent to the Arctic Classes as shown in table. These nominal equivalencies are not reciprocal.

== See also ==
- Polar Class
- Finnish–Swedish ice class
- Russian Maritime Register of Shipping § Ice class
