= Steerprop =

Finnish company

- Company type: Osakeyhtiö
- Founded: 2000
- Headquarters: Rauma, Finland
- Key people: Riku-Pekka Hägg (President and CEO)
- Services: Marine propulsion
- Revenue: €31,493,000 (2022)
- Number of employees: 66 (2022)
- Website: www.steerprop.com

Steerprop Oy is a Finnish company that produces marine propulsion equipment such as azimuth thrusters and bow thrusters. The company was established in 2000 in Rauma by a group of people who had previously worked at Rolls-Royce Marine Division.

Steerprop's main products are Z-drive and L-drive azimuth thrusters used for main propulsion of tugboats, icebreakers, offshore vessels and passenger ships. In addition to pushing and pulling type thrusters, the company also offers a line of contra-rotating (CRP) propulsion units with two propellers rotating in opposite directions.

== See also ==
- Finnish maritime cluster
