= Russian Maritime Register of Shipping =

Marine classification society

- Industry: Shipbuilding
- Genre: Classification Society
- Founded: 1913
- Headquarters: Saint Petersburg, Russian Federation
- Key people: Konstantin Palnikov, Chairman&CEO
- Services: Classification
- Number of employees: >1500
- Website: RMRS website

The Russian Maritime Register of Shipping (RMRS) (Russian: Российский морской регистр судоходства) maintains a ship register of the Russian Federation, based in Saint Petersburg, and is a marine classification society. Its activities aim to enhance safety of navigation, safety of life at sea, security of ships, safe carriage of cargo, environmental safety of ships, prevention of pollution from ships, and performance of authorisations issued by maritime administrations and customers.

RMRS develops and continually improves its rules and guidelines in compliance with requirements of the international standards to ensure the safety at sea and pollution prevention. The RMRS seeks to maintain its own quality management system at the highest possible level and also to promote implementation of high technical standards in design of ships, shipbuilding and shipping industry using its unique experience in ensuring maritime safety.

RMRS has over 100 offices worldwide providing classification, survey, certification, design appraisal and quality systems' verification services. RMRS was one of the twelve classification societies who are members of the International Association of Classification Societies (IACS), which cover 90% of the world merchant fleet. Due to the 2022 Russian invasion of Ukraine, IACS withdrew RMRS's membership on March 11, 2022. RMRS takes part in the work of the International Maritime Organization, the International Organization for Standardization and the International Labour Organization.

== History ==
In Russia the first acts of state technical supervision date back to the beginning of the 18th century - the time of the intensive development of the Russian fleet. By the end of the century the Charter of Merchant Shipping had been approved regulating mandatory state registration of ships and documentation on the technical condition of a vessel. At that time, ships were classed by type and age, therefore there emerged a necessity in a more advanced system that would take into account structural features, strength, technical condition and navigation area.

As soon as the end of the 19th century the first classification body was established. In 1899 the first classification rules emerged. On 31 December 1913, the charter of the classification society "Russian Register" was approved. The society was renamed several times due to the historical reasons: Russian Register, the USSR Register of Shipping, Russian Maritime Register of Shipping.

The proper technical condition of the fleet is to be provided by highly qualified staff and regular scientific research. Since 1914 the research and development activities have been coordinated by the Scientific and Technical Council. RMRS has always been using the latest scientific and technical achievements. The USSR Register of Shipping was the first society to develop requirements for Arctic ships. The society's rules for electric welding proved the possibility of implementation of this new technology during the construction and repair of ships. Since the 1950s the USSR Register of Shipping has become the only classification society in the world to have nuclear ships in its class.

Russian Maritime Register of Shipping is the legal successor of the USSR Register of Shipping.

== Organization and management ==
The RMRS is an international classification society established in 1913.

In RMRS class there are 6,677 ships flying flags of more than 40 states. RMRS structure comprises the Head Office in St. Petersburg and 109 offices in Russia and abroad. Over 1500 highly qualified specialists provide the whole range of RMRS works and services worldwide,

As members of the Russian Federation delegations, the RMRS experts participate in the proceedings of the IMO, ISO and EFQM committees and sub-committees. RMRS is an associate member of INTERTANKO, INTERCARGO and BIMCO.

RMRS performs classification and survey of ships and floating structures under construction and in service as well as statutory surveys as authorized by maritime administrations of a number of countries.

Authorized by the maritime administration of the Russian Federation and other 37 countries, RMRS performs certification of safety management systems of shipping companies and ships for compliance with ISM Code. This safety standard provides for establishing safety management systems in shipping companies and for eliminating human factor from safe operation of ships. RMRS experts on ISM Code working in RMRS offices worldwide provide prompt services on certification for compliance with the ISM Code requirements.

== Main objectives ==
- providing safety of life at sea;
- providing safe navigation of ships;
- safe carriage of goods by sea and in inland waters;
- promoting environmental protection.

== Classifications ==
=== Ice class ===
"Development of the Arctic has become the subject of intense attention due to the region's vast hydrocarbon resources", write Аgarcov et al. An oil transportation system in the Russian Arctic needed to be developed and for this purpose the RMRS was involved. The Arc6 and Arc7 ice classes were thus created.

==== Arc6 ====
Ships of this type are intended for transportation of liquid hydrocarbons "without assistance of icebreakers in waters of the northern seas in one-year loose pack ice of up to 1.1 m in winter-spring season and up to 1.7 m in summer-autumn season." Ambient temperature limits for Arc6 type vessels are -45 degrees C.

A 69,000 DWT tanker of this type was contracted in 2018 by Rosneft to the Zvezda Shipyard, and its keel had been laid by 2020. The ship was to be seven metres longer than the Aframax class, and for use with the output of Trebsa field and Titova field. The first such ship was named Valentin Pikul, after a soviet historical novelist.

==== Arc7 ====
Arc7 is a RMRS ice class of polar-capable ships.

The fifteen first-generation Yamalmax LNG carriers built in 2016–2019 as well as the arctic condensate tankers Boris Sokolov (built in 2018) and Yuriy Kuchiev (2019) serving the Yamal LNG project are of this class.

== See also ==
- Classification Society
- International Association of Classification Societies
- International Maritime Organization
