= Federal Agency for Sea and Inland Water Transport =

- Symbol of the Federal Agency for Sea and Inland Water Transport of the Russian Federation

- Flag of the Federal Agency for Sea and Inland Water Transport of the Russian Federation

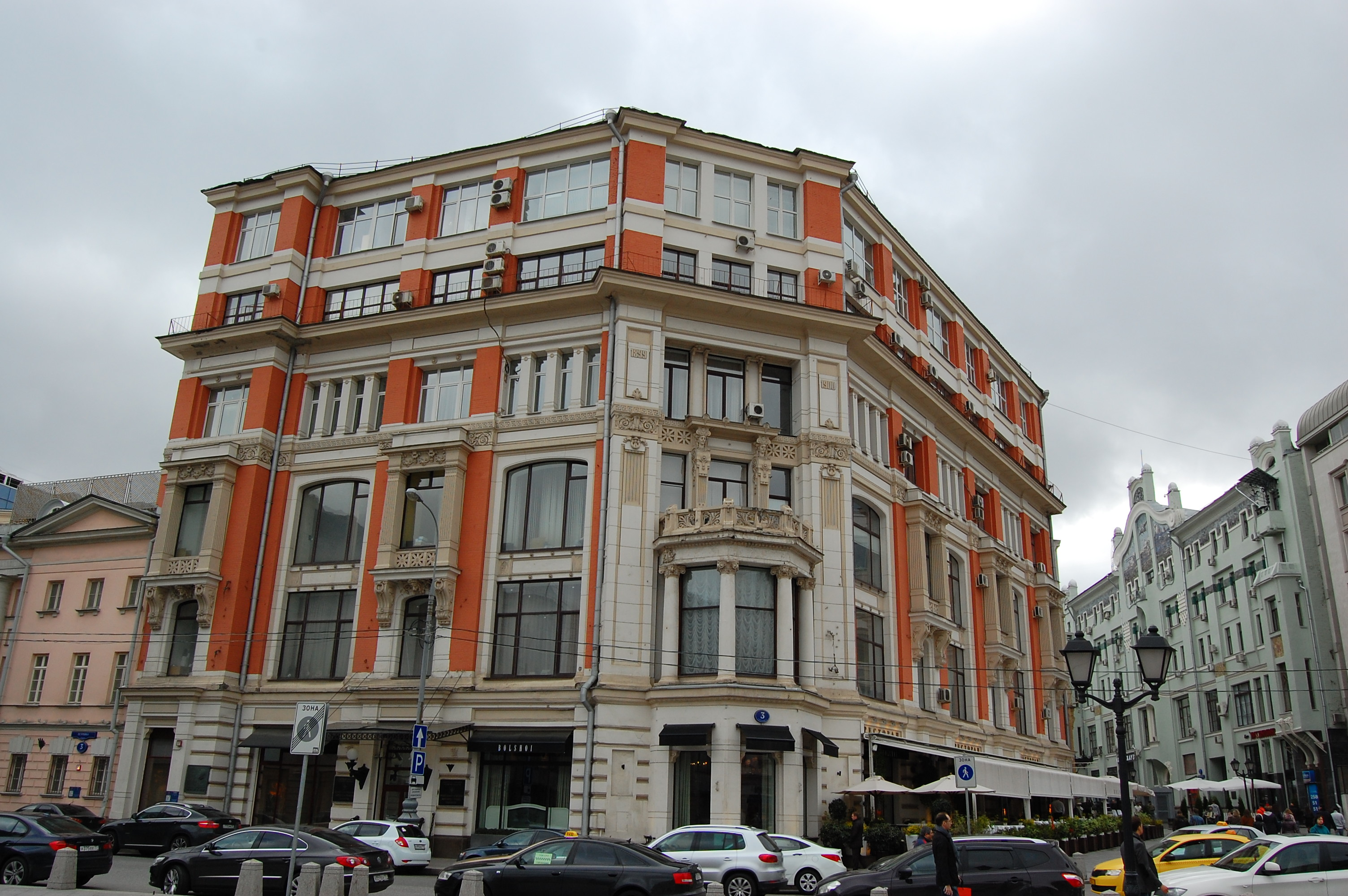
- Federal Agency for Sea and Inland Water Transport Main Office Building in 3/6 Petrovka, Moscow

Agency overview
- Formed: March 9, 2004; 22 years ago
- Headquarters: 3/6 Petrovka, Moscow, 125993.
- Minister responsible: Andrey Tarasenko, The Deputy Minister of Transport of the Russian Federation, The Head of the Federal Agency for Maritime and River Transport.
- Agency executives: Viktor VOVK, Deputy Head; Nadezhda ZHIKHAREVA, Deputy Head; Yuriy KOSTIN, Deputy Head; Aleksander POSHIVAY, Deputy Head; Konstantin STASYUK, Deputy Head
- Parent agency: Ministry of Transport of the Russian Federation
- Website: eng.morflot.ru

The Federal Agency for Sea and Inland Water Transport (abbreviated Rosmorrechflot or Rosmorport; Russian: Федеральное агентство морского и речного транспорта) is a federal executive body in Russian Federation. It is entrusted to manage state property, maintain transport security-related tasks and provide services in the field of maritime and inland waterway transport. It is under the jurisdiction of the Ministry of Transport of the Russian Federation.

== Overview ==
The Agency is responsible for managing state property, providing public services and carry law enforcement functions in maritime and river transportation field. It also has responsibility related to the development of the marine fishing sector and ports. As the competent authority in the field of maritime and inland waterway transport to fulfill obligations arising from the international treaties of the Russian Federation. Its activities are planned, defined and regulated by the orders of the President of Russian Federation, decisions of the Maritime Board, the Maritime Collegium of the Ministry of Transport, and government strategy decision documents such as Transport Strategy of the Russian Federation for the period up to 2030 and Transport System Development, 2010-2020. It also targeted to ensure the availability, volume, and competitiveness of maritime and inland waterway transport in accordance the quality criteria for cargo owners, complying with the innovative development strategy of the Russian Federation. Its works include activities related to integration into the world transport system and transit-related activities.

== History ==
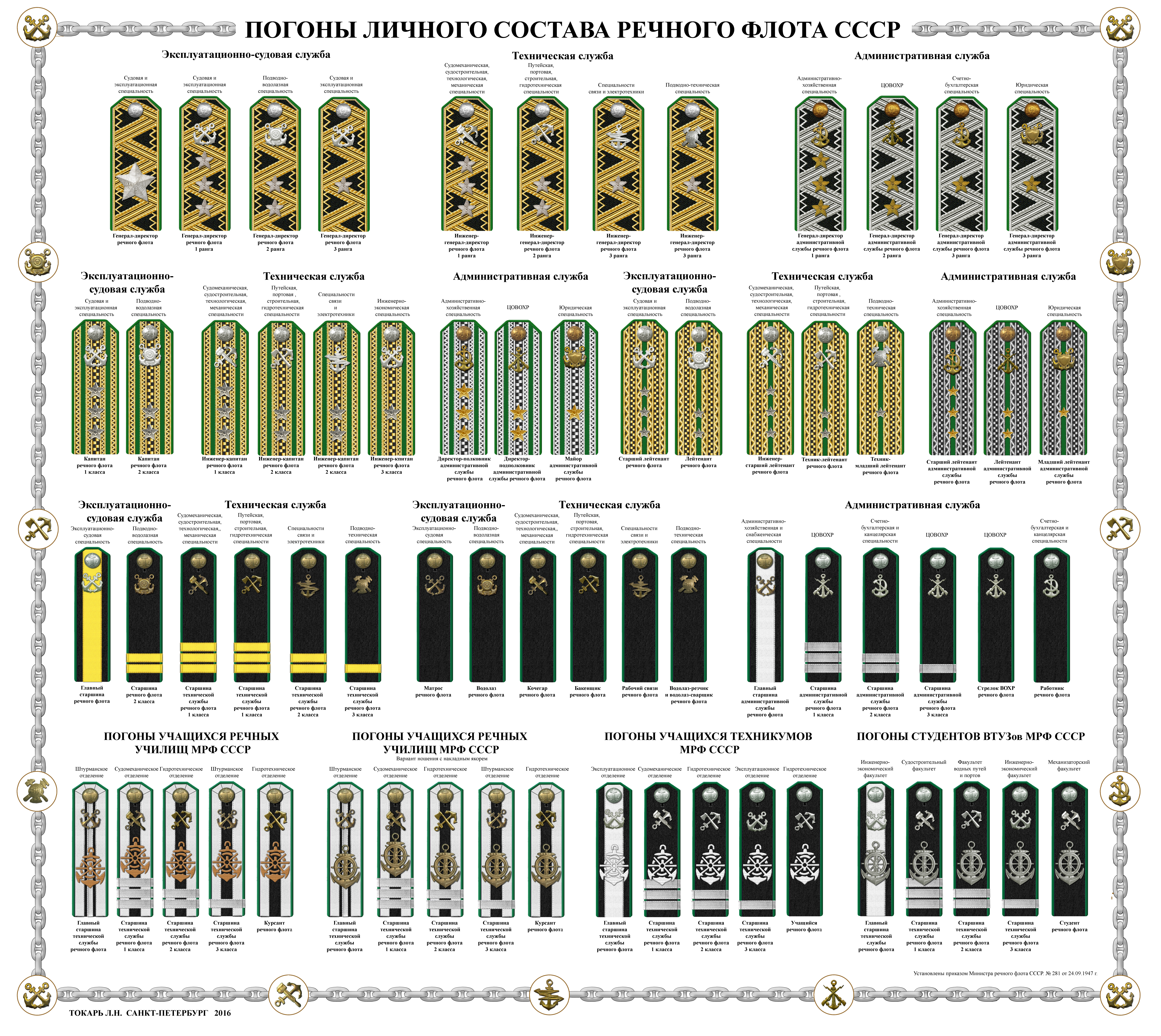
Staff shoulder boards by Ministry of River Fleet of the Soviet Union (science 1947)

The People's Commissariat for Water Transport, in Russian: Народный комиссариат водного транспорта - Narodnyy Komissariat Vodnovo Transporta, abbreviated Наркомвод - Narkomvod, was established on 30 January 1931. It was the Soviet Ministry for Water Transportation and was responsible for maintaining marine and river transportation and the management of the Soviet merchant marine fleet. On 9 April 1939 the People's Commissariat was abolished and split into the People's Commissariat of the River Fleet and the People's Commissariat of the Sea Fleet.

The Federal Agency for Sea and Inland Water Transport was established at March 9, 2004 following the Decree of the President of the Russian Federation No. 314, On the system and structure of Federal Executive Bodies.

== Structure and management ==
According to the government resolution No. 371 dated July 23, 2004, Rosmorrechflot reports to the Ministry of Transport of the Russian Federation. The Head of the Agency is a Deputy Minister of Transport of the Russian Federation. The current head is Olersky Victor Alexandrovich, who is assisted by five deputy heads and six departmental chiefs; Chief of Economics and Finance Department, Chief of Transport Security Department, Chief of Administrative Department, Chief of Property Matters and Enforceability Department, Chief of Investment and Development Programs Department, and Chief of Navigation Department.

The Agency has established and operates the Board of Rosmorrechflot and four councils; Expert Council, Council for Education, the Council of Captains of Sea Ports and Council of heads of administrations of inland waterways. The Expert Council under the Board is an expert body, called upon to interact with business and the public to help find effective solutions in the field of sea and river transport on the basis of interaction between the state and business. The Council of Captains of Sea Ports, the Council for Education and the Council of the Managers of the Administrations of the Inland Waterways, consult formation of a unified policy in the field of port control, maritime safety, development of sectoral education and development of inland waterways.

== Area of Activities and Functions ==
The Federal Agency for Maritime and River Transport (Rosmorrechflot) is responsible for the administration, regulation and development of maritime and inland waterway transport in Russia. Its functions include the administration and operation of seaports and river ports, maintenance and development of maritime and inland waterway infrastructure, regulation of vessel traffic on inland waterways, issuing navigation permits, providing icebreaking support, and maintaining registers of seaports, shipping routes and bunker fuel suppliers.

The agency coordinates maritime search and rescue services, including the prevention and response to marine oil spills. It is also responsible for the certification of rescue services, rescue units and individual rescuers, as well as the certification of vessel captains and crew members. Other responsibilities include the oversight of port services, implementation of maritime and inland waterway infrastructure projects, and the maintenance of spatial data relating to maritime and river transport.

Rosmorrechflot also oversees educational institutions specialising in maritime and inland waterway transport. Its educational responsibilities include the development of training programmes and professional standards, operation of training vessels, recognition and inspection of maritime educational institutions and training centres, and approval of training equipment.

=== Subordinated agencies ===
Federal State Unitary Enterprises

- Rosmorport
- Morsvyazsputnik
- Sea Port Administrations
- Administration of the Western Arctic Sea Ports
- Administration of the Baltic Sea Sea Ports
- Administration of the Azov Sea Ports
- Administration of the Black Sea Sea Ports
- Administration of the Caspian Sea Ports
- Administration of the Primorsky Krai and Eastern Arctic Sea Ports
- Administration of the Okhotsk Sea and the Tatar Strait Sea Ports
- Administration of the Sakhalin, Kuril Islands and Kamchatka Sea Ports
- Inland Waterway Basin Administrations
- Volga-Don Inland Waterway Basin Administration
- Volga-Baltic Inland Waterway Basin Administration
- Administration White Sea-Onega Basin of Inland Waterways
- Administration of the North Dvina Basin of Inland Waterways
- Administration of the Pechora Basin of Inland Waterways
- Moscow Canal
- Administration of the Volga Basin of Inland Waterways
- Administration of the Kama Basin of Inland Waterways
- Administration of the Azov-Don Basin of Inland Waterways
- Administration of the Ob-Irtysh Basin of Inland Waterways
- Administration of the Ob Basin of Inland Waterways
- Administration of the Yenisei Basin of Inland Waterways
- Administration of the Baikal-Angara Basin of Inland Waterways
- Administration of the Lena Basin of Inland Waterways
- Administration of the Amur Basin of Inland Waterways

==== Educational Institutions ====
- Admiral Makarov State University of Maritime and Inland Shipping
- Admiral Ushakov State Maritime University
- Admiral Nevelskoy Maritime State University
- Volga State University of Water Transport
- Siberian State University of Water Transport
- Educational and Methodological Center for Sea and River Transport

==== Other entities ====
- Federal State Budgetary Institution "Morresluzhba"
- Federal State Budgetary Institution "SKC Rosmorrechflot"
- Federal State Budgetary Institution "Directorate of the State Customer of Maritime Transport Development Programs"
- Federal State Budgetary Institution "Rechvodput"
- Federal State Budgetary Institution "Maritime Safety Service"
- Federal State Budgetary Institution "Northern Sea Route Administration"
- Federal State Budgetary Institution "Museum of the Marine Fleet"
- Federal State Budgetary Institution "Educational and Methodological Center for Sea and River Transport"
- Federal State Institution for Ensuring the Performance of the Functions of the Authorized Representative of the Russian Federation for the Saimaa Canal
- Federal State Budgetary Institution "Main Communications and Satellite Systems Center"

== See also ==
- Ministry of the Maritime Fleet (Soviet Union)

== Bibliography ==
- Armstrong, Terence (2011). The Northern Sea Route: Soviet Exploitation of the North East Passage. Cambridge University Press. ISBN 9780521232630.
- Bollinger, Martin J. (2003). Stalin's Slave Ships: Kolyma, the Gulag Fleet, and the Role of the West. Greenwood Publishing Group. ISBN 9780275981006.
- Rees, E. A. (1995). "The Transport Crisis, 1931". Stalinism and Soviet Rail Transport, 1928–1941. Studies in Soviet history and society. Palgrave Macmillan. ISBN 9780312123819.
