= Spirit of Tasmania (disambiguation) =

Spirit of Tasmania is best known as the trading name of TT-Line (Australia).

It can also refer to the following ferries that have been operated by the business at some time during their careers:

- Spirit of Tasmania – serviced the Devonport-Melbourne route, 1994-2002 – now known as Princess Seaways
- Spirit of Tasmania I – serviced the Devonport-Melbourne then Devonport-Geelong, 2002–2026
- Spirit of Tasmania II – serviced the Devonport-Melbourne then Devonport-Geelong, 2002–2026
- Spirit of Tasmania III – serviced the Devonport-Sydney route, 2003-2006 – now known as Mega Express Four
- Spirit of Tasmania IV - in service
- Spirit of Tasmania V - in service
