= Bass Strait ferries =

Ferry services between Tasmania and mainland Australia

Bass Strait Ferry

Overview
- Owner: Spirit of Tasmania
- Locale: Australia
- Termini: Devonport; Geelong

Service
- Operator: Spirit of Tasmania

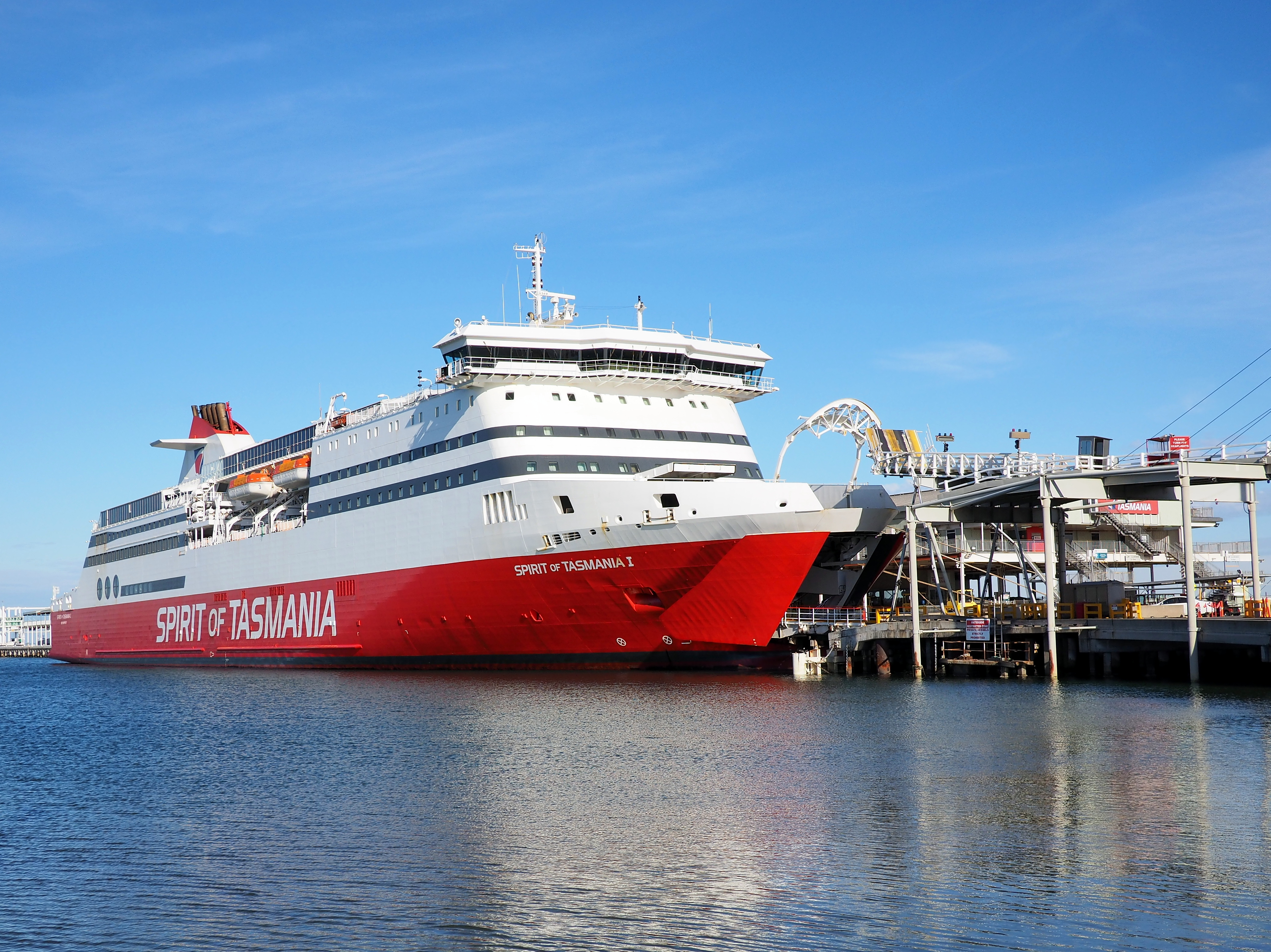
Bass Strait ferry Spirit of Tasmania I in 2014

Bass Strait Ferries have been the ships that have been used for regular transport across Bass Strait between Tasmania and Victoria on mainland Australia, as well as the various attempts to link Tasmania with Sydney. Historically, some regular shipping services in the twentieth century linked Sydney, Melbourne and Hobart with the Bass Strait ports: Launceston's various port locations, Devonport and Burnie. The distinction between coastal shipping and Bass Strait ferry has been blurred at times.

At various stages the cost of shipping between Tasmania and the Australian mainland have caused enquiries and calls for subsidies or reduced rates of both ferries and general shipping.

== History ==
In the 1840s the Launceston–Melbourne Steam Navigation Company was in business with Black Swan, Royal Shepherd and Havilah. The Shamrock at this time was engaged in a service between Sydney, Melbourne and Launceston

Tasmanian Steamers commenced in the 1920s with three ships.

The Oonah (originally on the Sydney-Hobart route) was operated along with SS Loongana and Nairana until 1935 when Oonah and Loongana were replaced by the SS Taroona.

In 1959 the Australian National Line took over the service, and from 1959 to 1972, the Princess of Tasmania made crossings between Melbourne and Devonport. The cargo-only Bass Trader carried heavy vehicles from Melbourne to Tasmania until the Australian Trader was added in 1969 with services from Melbourne to Burnie, Devonport and Bell Bay (Launceston) in rotation.

From 1965 to 1972, the Empress of Australia made three crossings per fortnight from Sydney to Hobart, Bell Bay and Burnie. In 1972 the Empress of Tasmania replaced the Princess of Tasmania on the Melbourne to Devonport route and the Australian Trader moved to the Sydney-Tasmania routes.

The Tasmanian Government's Spirit of Tasmania took over the service from 1985 when the Abel Tasman replaced the Empress of Tasamnia and made six weekly overnight crossings between Devonport and Melbourne. It was replaced by the Spirit of Tasmania in 1993.

In the summer months of 1998 to 2002, Spirit of Tasmania in conjunction with SeaCat Tasmania, also operated the high speed catamaran Devil Cat between Port Welshpool, 200 kilometres south east of Melbourne and George Town near Bell Bay. The trip took six hours.

Flinders island can also be reached by ferry from Bridport in Tasmania, and from Port Welshpool in Victoria.

=== 2002 - Spirit of Tasmania I, II, III ===
In 2002 the Spirit of Tasmania was replaced with the two ferries previously owned by Superfast Ferries Spirit of Tasmania I and Spirit of Tasmania II, with two crossings each night leaving simultaneously from Melbourne and Devonport. From January 2004 to June 2006 a third ship, Spirit of Tasmania III, operated on the Devonport to Sydney route.

=== 2022 - Spirit of Tasmania IV, V ===
In 2022, Rauma Marine Constructions started construction of Spirit of Tasmania IV and Spirit of Tasmania V in Finland. They are scheduled to enter service in 2026.

In October 2022, Spirit of Tasmania moved its Victorian terminal from Station Pier in Melbourne to the new purpose built Spirit of Tasmania Quay in Geelong.

== Localities and ports ==
- Bell Bay
- Burnie
- Devonport
- Launceston
- Station Pier, Melbourne
- Geelong

== Ships ==
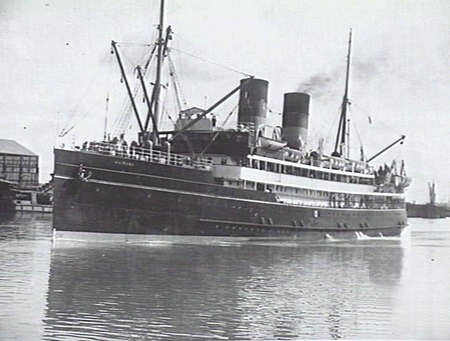
SS Nairana

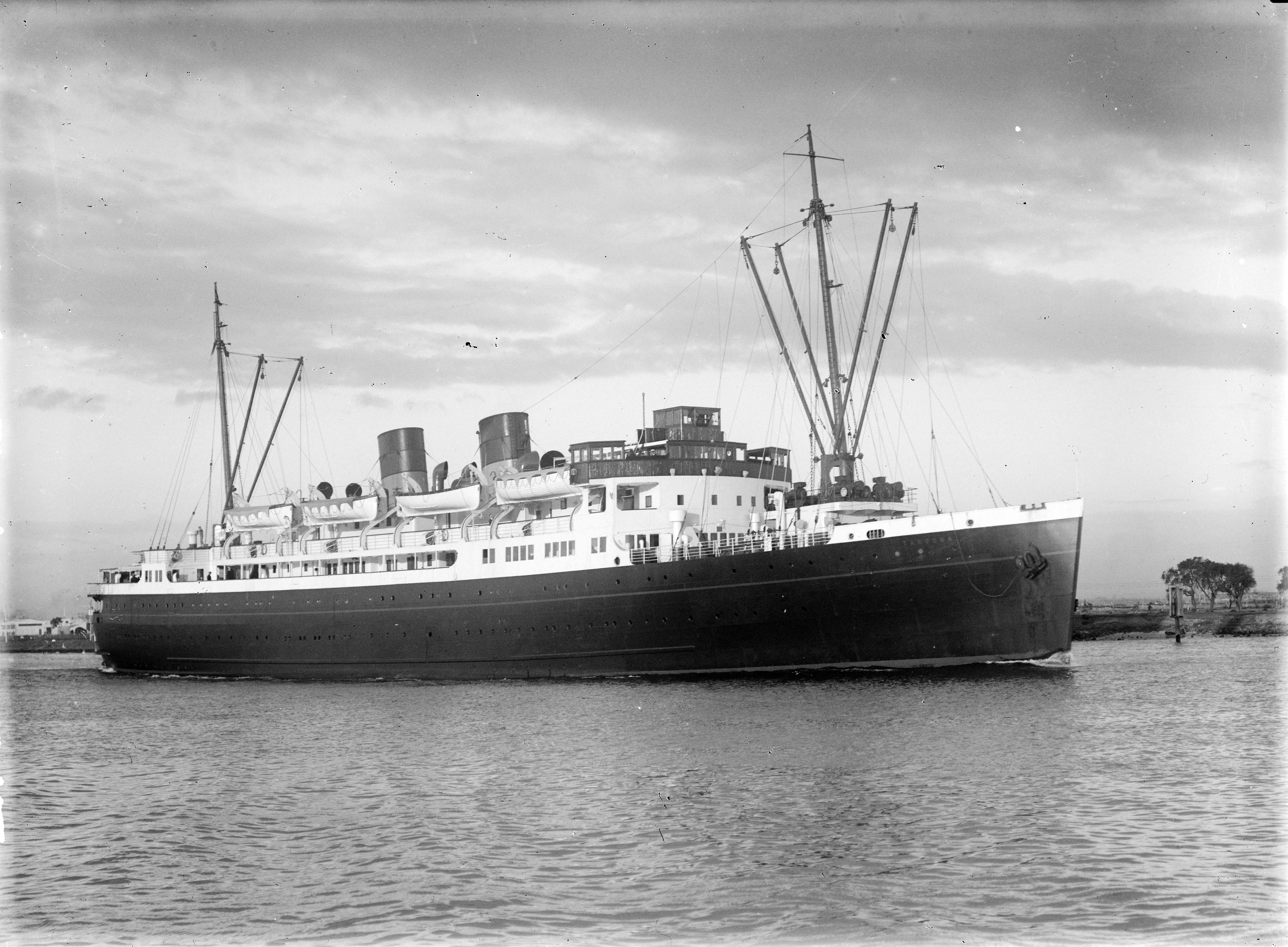
SS Taroona in 1951

(chronological)

- Black Swan, Royal Shepherd, Havilah and Derwent (1850s to 1870s)
- Mangana and Flinders (from 1879)
- Pateena, Flora and Penguin (1880s)
- SS Burrumbeet (from 1889)
- SS Coogee (1890s)
- SS Pateena
- SS Rotomahana
- SS City of Melbourne
- SS Oonah
- SS Loongana
- SS Nairana
- SS Taroona
- Princess of Tasmania
- MS Bass Trader
- MS Empress of Australia
- MS Australian Trader
- MS Abel Tasman
- Spirit of Tasmania
- HSC Devil Cat
- Spirit of Tasmania I
- Spirit of Tasmania II
- Spirit of Tasmania III
