= HMAS Jervis Bay (AKR 45) =

Former Australian navy catamaran

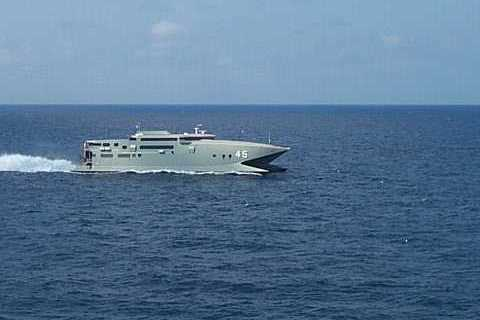
- HMAS Jervis Bay in 2000

History

Australia
- Namesake: Jervis Bay
- Builder: Incat, Tasmania
- Launched: November 1997
- Commissioned: 10 June 1999
- Decommissioned: 11 May 2001
- Motto: "Strive Valiantly"
- Nickname(s): Dili Express
- Honours and awards: Battle honours: East Timor 1999–2000
- Status: Returned to civilian service
- Badge

General characteristics in military service
- Type: Wave-piercing catamaran
- Displacement: 1,250 tons
- Length: 86.62 m (284.2 ft)
- Beam: 26 m (85 ft)
- Draught: 3.6 m (12 ft)
- Propulsion: 4 × Ruston 20RK270 medium-speed diesels; 4 × Lips waterjets
- Speed: 48 knots (89 km/h; 55 mph)
- Range: 1,000 nautical miles (1,900 km; 1,200 mi)
- Troops: 500 soldiers, plus equipment and light vehicles
- Complement: 20
- Armament: 2 × 7.62mm General Purpose Machine Guns

HMAS Jervis Bay (AKR 45) was a wave piercing catamaran that operated in the Royal Australian Navy (RAN).

Built by Incat in Tasmania and launched in 1997 as Incat 045, the ship was chartered to TT-Line as Tascat to supplement cross-Bass Strait services until the company acquired new ships. The catamaran remained laid up until 1999, when she was commissioned into the Royal Australian Navy as a troop and equipment transport, becoming the first large catamaran to enter naval service. Jervis Bay operated in support of the INTERFET peacekeeping taskforce until May 2001, when she was decommissioned and returned to the builder.

In 2002, the ferry was sent to Europe, operating briefly in the Mediterranean before being chartered by Speed Ferries for a cross-English Channel ferry service as HSC SpeedOne. She is now owned by Seajets and is named Champion Jet 3.

== Construction ==
The ship was laid down as Incat 045 in 1997, at Incat's shipyards in Hobart, Tasmania. She was launched in November 1997 as a speculative order.

Four Ruston 20RK270 medium-speed diesels propel the catamaran at speeds of up to 45 knots (83 km/h; 52 mph).

== Operational history ==
=== TT-Line ===
The ship's first period of service was on charter to TT-Line, for service between Melbourne, Victoria and Devonport, Tasmania. Named Tascat, the ship ran in conjunction with the first Spirit of Tasmania until the new ferries Spirit of Tasmania I and Spirit of Tasmania II entered service, at which point she was laid up.

=== RAN ===
After an increase in instability in nations near Australia, the Australian Defence Force sought to upgrade a second brigade-size group to activation on short notice. Delays in refitting the two Kanimbla class vessels acquired from the United States Navy several years earlier meant that the Royal Australian Navy's sealift capability had to be supplemented in order to support two brigades. The RAN sought a large, high-speed catamaran from either Incat or Austal: both companies had vessels available, but only Incat was able to provide a ship before June 1999. A two-year bareboat charter was signed for Incat 045 in May 1999, and the vessel was commissioned into the RAN as HMAS Jervis Bay on 10 June 1999.

For military service, the catamaran was modified with enlarged fuel tanks to extend her range to 1,000 nautical miles (1,900 km; 1,200 mi) and additional air-conditioning units to improve equipment operational reliability in tropical climates. Sections of the vehicle deck were reinforced to support up to nine tons of weight per axle, allowing the vessel to transport most Australian Army vehicles. The catamaran's vehicle ramp was modified so it could be self-deployed, instead of requiring dock facilities. After modification, Jervis Bay could transport 500 troops, plus their equipment, supplies, and vehicles. In order to maintain a high operational tempo without personnel fatigue or burnout, two ships' companies of 20 (including five Army personnel responsible for the embarcation, storage, and disembarcation of Army personnel and equipment) were established; a practice later used by the RAN on patrol boats and survey ships. Because Jervis Bay was designed for short-haul voyages, crew and passenger facilities were limited: little potable water was carried, cooking facilities were minimal, and there were no sleeping facilities for the crew. Later modifications included the installation of additional water tanks, and the fitting of 20 bunks.

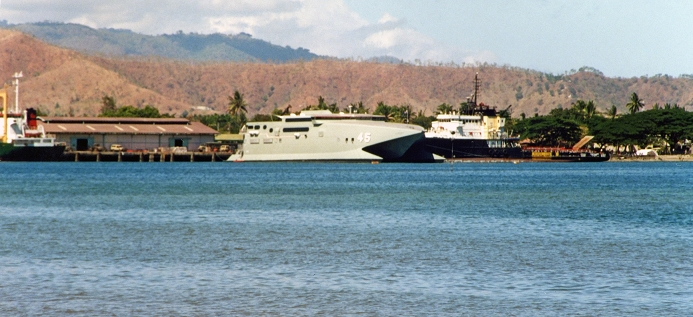
HMAS Jervis Bay in Dili in October 1999

Based in Darwin after commissioning, Jervis Bay was in a fortuitous position to respond to the 1999 East Timorese crisis, and was used to provide logistic support to the Australian-led INTERFET peacekeeping taskforce. The catamaran was the first RAN ship to reach Dili; deploying 3RAR to the city's damaged docks on 12 September. Jervis Bay was then used to transport soldiers and equipment between Darwin and Dili: she was capable of sailing the 430 nautical miles (800 km; 490 mi) in around 11 hours at an average speed of approximately 45 knots (83 km/h; 52 mph). The catamaran was also used to transport humanitarian aid, and relocate displaced persons.

During the two years of the ship's commission in the RAN, Jervis Bay made 107 trips between Darwin and East Timor, shipping 20,000 passengers, 430 vehicles and 5,600 tonnes of freight, becoming known as the "Dili Express". Running the catamaran was found to be more efficient than using air transport to move materiel to and from East Timor, with the higher sailing speed meaning she could turn around a payload faster than multiple C-130 Hercules flights for an equivalent load.

In March 2010, the ship was retroactively awarded the battle honour "East Timor 1999–2000".

The successful use of a catamaran in military logistics operations led to the acquisition of three Incat catamarans by the United States military (Joint Venture, Spearhead and Swift) and prompted the development of the Independence class littoral combat ships as trimarans.

== Decommissioning and post-RAN operations ==
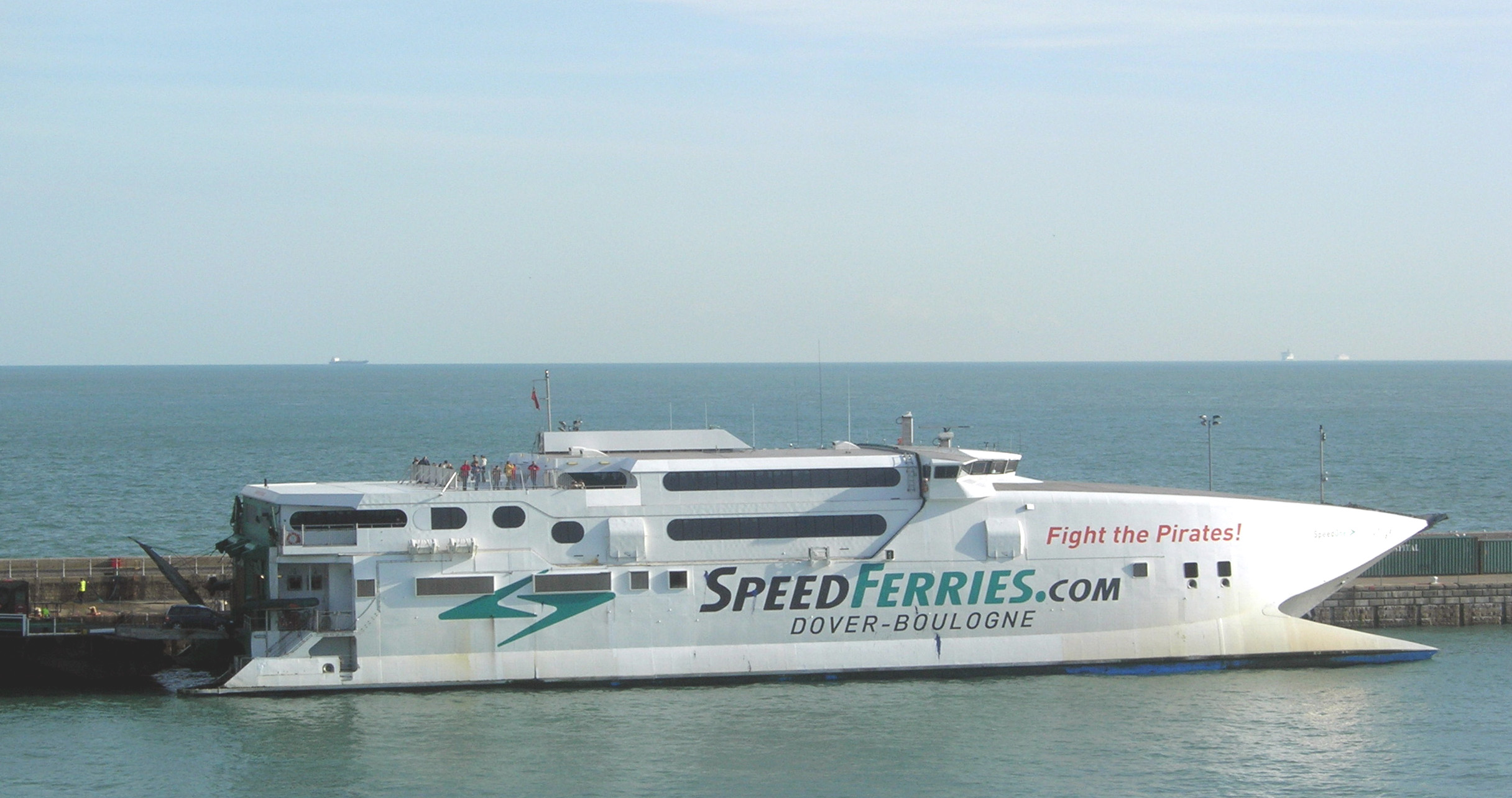
SpeedOne in Dover

Jervis Bay was decommissioned on 11 May 2001. The total cost of hiring Jervis Bay was A$16 million. The ship was not returned to Incat until 2002, when she was chartered to Italian ferry company TRIS and named Winner. She operated between Genoa and Palau in Italy, until the company's collapse later that year. She was laid up again, until she was purchased by United Kingdom cross-channel operator SpeedFerries in 2004 and renamed HSC SpeedOne. On 26 March 2010, it was announced that the ferry had been acquired by Condor Ferries, and would enter service in late May under the name Condor Rapide.
