= Jervis Bay (disambiguation) =

Jervis Bay is the body of water in Australia.

Jervis Bay may also refer to:

- Jervis Bay Territory, in Australia
- Ships named after the bay
  - HMS Jervis Bay formerly liner SS Jervis Bay, a British armed merchant cruiser
  - HMAS Jervis Bay (GT 203), roll-on roll-off ferry operated by Australian navy as training and logistics ship 1977-1994
  - HMAS Jervis Bay (AKR 45), high speed catamaran operating with Australian navy as transport 1999-2001
