= Melbourne Terminus =

Melbourne Terminus may refer to:

- Flinders Street railway station
- Southern Cross railway station
- Station Pier
