= 2022 QRL Women's Premiership =

Rugby league season

QRL Women's Premiership
- Current season or competition: 2022 QRL Women's Premiership
- Sport: Rugby league
- Instituted: 2019; 6 years ago
- Inaugural season: 2020
- Number of teams: 8
- Country: Australia
- Website: www.qrl.com.au
- Related competition: NRL Women's Premiership; NSWRL Women's Premiership

The '2022 QRL Women's Premiership' was the 3rd season of Queensland's first top-level statewide open age women's competition. rugby league competition run by the Queensland Rugby League. The competition, known as the BMD Premiership due to sponsorship from BMD Group, is the top level of women's rugby league football in Queensland, Australia featured 8 teams playing a 9-week long season (including finals) from March to June.

== Teams ==
The QRL Women's Premiership consists of eight teams, five from South East Queensland and one each from North Queensland, Central Queensland and Northern New South Wales. The league operates on a single group system, with no divisions or conferences and no relegation and promotion from other leagues.

=== Current clubs ===
QRL Women's Premiership
Club	Established	Joined	City	Stadium(s)
Brisbane Tigers	1917	2020	Brisbane	Totally Workwear Stadium
Burleigh Bears	1934	2020	Gold Coast	Pizzey Park
Central Queensland Capras	1996	2020	Rockhampton	Browne Park
North Queensland Gold Stars	2019	2020	Townsville	Jack Manski Oval
Tweed Heads Seagulls	1909	2020	Tweed Heads	Piggabeen Sports Complex
Valkyries Queensland	2021	2021	Brisbane	Davies Park
Valleys Diehards	1909	2021	Brisbane	Emerson Park
West Brisbane Panthers	1915	2020	Brisbane	Frank Lind Oval

=== Previous clubs ===
QRL Women's Premiership
Club	First season	Last season	City	Stadium(s)
Ipswich Brothers	2020	2020	Ipswich	Blue Ribbon Motors Field
Souths Logan Magpies	2020	2020	Brisbane	Davies Park
