= Spirit Quay =

General information
- Location: Devonport, Tasmania, Australia
- Completed: October 2026
- Owner: TasPorts

Design and construction
- Main contractor: BMD Constructions

Website
- www.spiritoftasmania.com.au

Spirit Quay is a ferry terminal in Devonport, Tasmania used by Spirit of Tasmania services.

== History ==
In April 2021 Spirit of Tasmania ordered two new ships, the Spirit of Tasmania IV and Spirit of Tasmania V, to operate services from Devonport across Bass Strait to Geelong.

Because the new ships were larger than their predecessors, a new wharf was required in Devonport. As a result, the new ships entry into service was delayed by over two years.

Construction of the wharf by BMD Constructions began in November 2024, with it opening in October 2026.
