= BMD Group =

Australian construction company

- Industry: Construction
- Founded: 1979
- Founder: Mick Power
- Headquarters: Brisbane, Australia
- Revenue: $2.3 billion (2023/24)
- Number of employees: 2,300 (2024)
- Website: www.bmdgroup.global

BMD Group is an Australian construction company based in Brisbane, Queensland founded by Mick Power in 1979.

== Subsidiaries ==
Subsidiaries are:

- BMD Constructions
- BMD Urban
- Empower, established 1987
- JMAC Constructions, acquired 2010
- Urbex

== Notable projects ==
Notable projects have included:

- Bendigo Airport upgrade
- Bravus Mining & Resources Carmichael rail network
- Brisbane Airport second runway in joint venture with CPB Contractors
- Centenary Bridge duplication in joint venture with Georgiou Group
- Dalrymple Bay Coal Terminal, Hay Point expansion
- Legacy Way in a consortium with Acciona and Ghella
- Melton Highway over the Deniliquin railway line in Sydenham
- Port Botany container terminal expansion
- Riverina Intermodal Freight & Logistics Hub
- Spirit of Tasmania Corio Bay terminal
- Spirit of Tasmania Spirit Quay terminal Devonport in consortium with BridgePro Engineering and Fitzgerald Constructions
- Victoria Park-Canning Level Crossing Removal Project in consortium with Acciona, Aecom and WSP

== Sponsorships ==
- Brisbane Lions
- Kougari Oval
- QRL Women's Premiership
- Wynnum Manly Seagulls
