= SpeedFerries =

Former British hovercraft ferry operator

- Company type: Limited
- Founded: 2004
- Founder: Curt Stavis
- Defunct: 2008
- Fate: Dissolved
- Headquarters: Dover, United Kingdom
- Area served: England, France
- Services: Passenger transportation

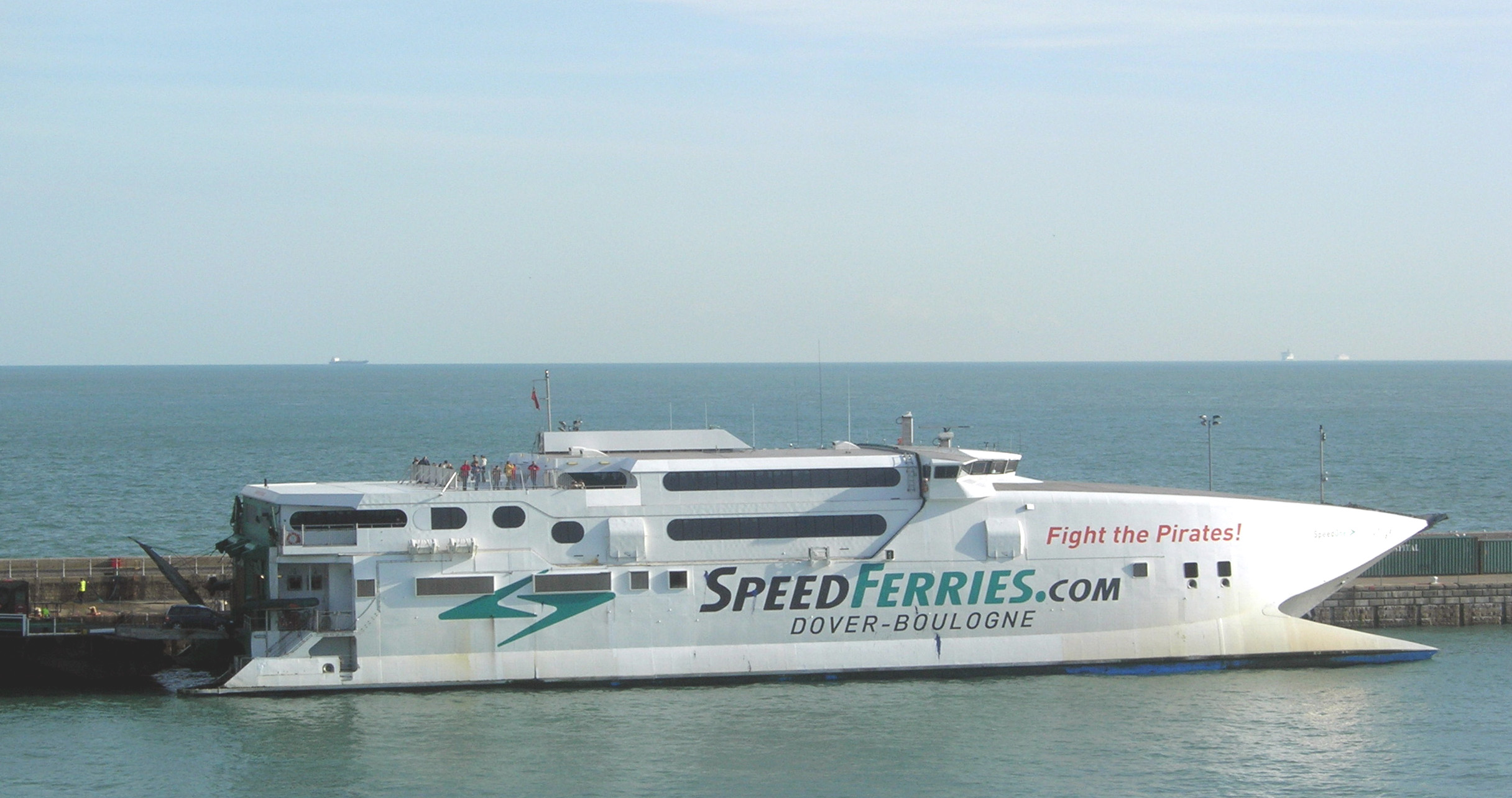
SpeedOne - a high-speed wave piercing catamaran at Dover Eastern Docks

SpeedFerries was a low cost ferry operator which started in May 2004 and continued in business until November 2008. It operated one route between Dover in England and Boulogne in France. It had one high-speed ferry, called SpeedOne.

Its founder and CEO was Curt Stavis, originally from Denmark.

== History ==
SpeedFerries was the first low cost fast ferry operator in the English Channel, and faced considerable opposition from the existing ferry operators, whom SpeedFerries accused of acting unfairly and using illegal practices. These allegations included blocking berths to prevent ferries docking, spying, and hoax bomb scares. In response, SpeedFerries liveried its ship with 'Fight the Pirates' on the side.

In January 2005, the company was featured in the BBC's Trouble at the Top programme: the edition's name was "Fight the Pirates". In the amphibious car redux episode of Top Gear (Season 10, Episode 2) the ferry appears in a staged bit where it appears as though it is going to run over James May and Richard Hammond.

Reports in the maritime press indicated that SpeedFerries had secured a second vessel for use in 2007 which was likely to be the Mastercat, a 91 m (299 ft) Incat catamaran which was to be replaced with a larger vessel by its owners, Master Ferries. However, Master Ferries were unable to secure the larger vessel so Mastercat was no longer available to SpeedFerries. Sailings to be operated by the second vessel were advertised on the SpeedFerries website. In May 2008, SpeedFerries bought SpeedOne from Incat.

In February 2007, SpeedFerries signed a lease on the former Dover Hoverport, though not the terminal building, at Dover's Western Docks, and subsequently moved operations there in March 2007. Once the move was achieved, SpeedFerries was able to provide exclusive facilities in both of its ports as it no longer shared them with other operators.

== Arrest ==
On 6 November 2008, SpeedOne was arrested in Boulogne in a dispute over unpaid taxes. SpeedFerries issued a statement on its website concerning the situation.

Yesterday afternoon, shortly after 17:00 UK time, the Port authorities of Boulogne arrested SpeedFerries’ SpeedOne during its turnaround. The arrest was made on the basis of SpeedFerries Limited’s debts to the port in relation to port dues and taxes.

The arrest was totally unexpected, as the authorities had given written confirmation that no legal steps would be taken prior to a meeting planned for 10:00 today. At this meeting SpeedFerries in consultation with its bankers and financial advisors, were to present a proposal for a resolution of the issues relating to outstanding dues and taxes, as well as disputes with the Port regarding:

A) Substantial counterclaims towards the Port which have been entirely ignored by the French authorities, and

B) Serious competition and discriminatory issues in relation to the Port’s dealings with a French ferry operator preparing to start-up a Dover-Boulogne service.

The authorities informed the SpeedFerries staff on site that the arrest was carried out despite the written agreement, as "this would strengthen the negotiating position of the Port against SpeedFerries".

As the actions of the Boulogne Port authorities are now proven to be unpredictable and inconsistent with their given guarantees, SpeedFerries finds itself in a position where it is unable to inform its customers, employees or business partners, of a firm date for the resumption of services.

The company deeply regrets this situation and asks everyone affected to accept our sincere apologies. Further statements will be issued when more information of substance becomes available.

== Administration ==
On 13 November 2008, SpeedFerries went into administration. On 17 November, administrators were appointed and on 26 November the following closure notice was issued:

The Joint Administrators regretfully announce the closure of Speedferries Limited (in administration). The Joint Administrators have been exploring every possible avenue to save the business since 12 November 2008 and it is unfortunate that a buyer for the business has not been found.

Speedferries Limited (in administration) will now cease to operate services between Dover and Boulogne and customers with pre-booked tickets are advised to seek alternative travel arrangements.

Customers who have booked by way of credit card should contact their credit card providers to determine if they are eligible to claim a refund for these now cancelled services.

All creditors, including customers who are affected by the cancelled crossings, will be contacted by the Joint Administrators in due course.
