= Spirit of Tasmania V =

Bass Strait cargo ferry operated by Spirit of Tasmania

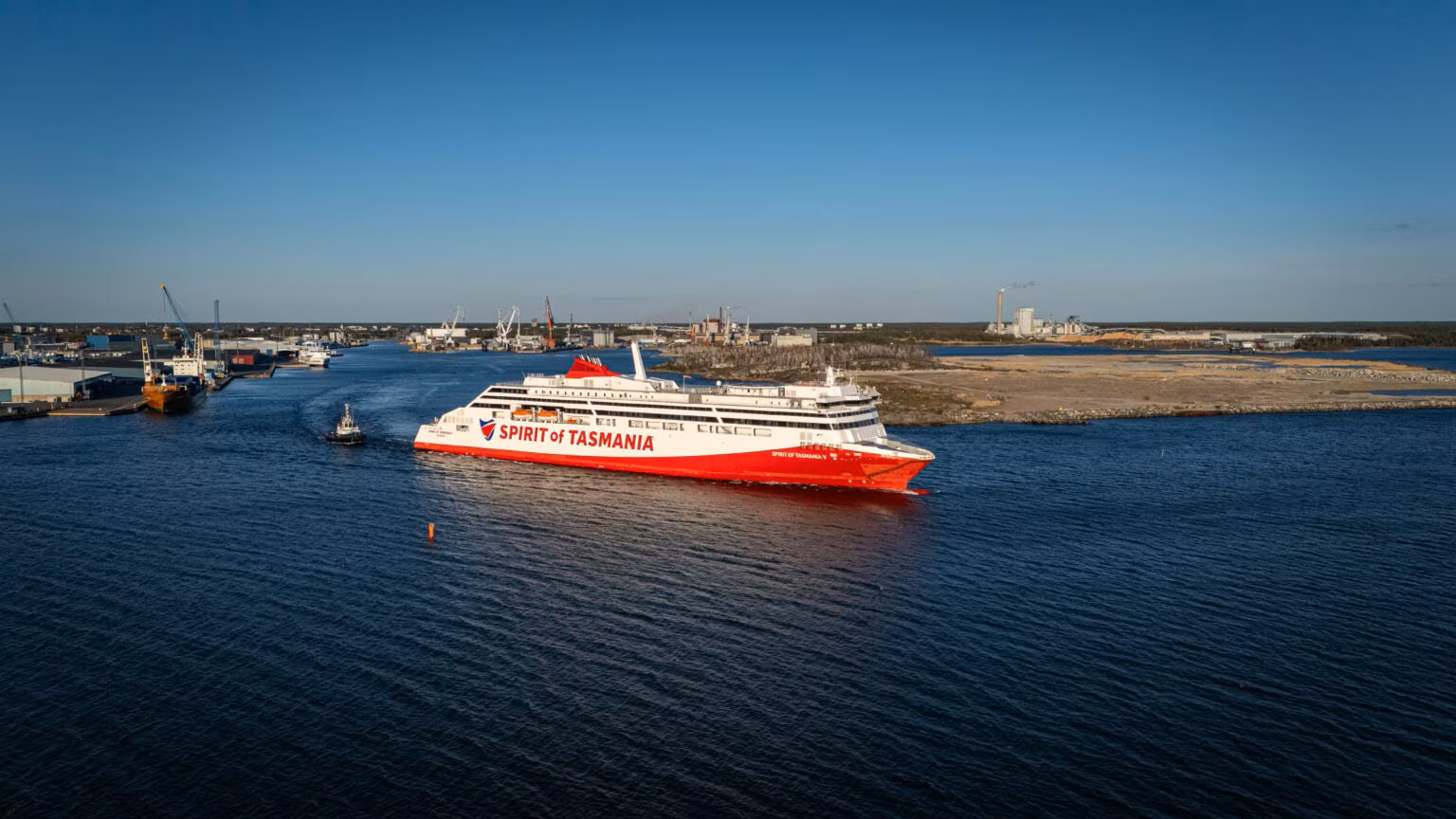
- Spirit of Tasmania V departing the Rauma Marine Constructions shipyard

History
- Name: Spirit of Tasmania V
- Owner: Spirit of Tasmania
- Operator: Spirit of Tasmania
- Port of registry: Devonport
- Route: Devonport–Geelong
- Ordered: April 2021
- Builder: Rauma Marine Constructions, Rauma, Finland
- Launched: 19 July 2024
- In service: 31 October 2026
- Identification: IMO number: 9936599
- Status: In Service

General characteristics
- Class & type: Roll-on/roll-off ferry
- Tonnage: 47,994 GT; 6,400 DWT
- Length: 212 m (695 ft 6 in)
- Beam: 31 m (102 ft)
- Installed power: 4 × Wärtsilä 9L46DF (4 × 10,305 kW)
- Speed: 31.5 knots (58.3 km/h; 36.2 mph) maximum speed, 26 knots service speed
- Capacity: 1,800 passengers; 4,098 lanemeters

Spirit of Tasmania V is a roll-on/roll-off ferry. It is operated by Spirit of Tasmania in Australia on the Bass Strait ferry route between Geelong, Victoria and Devonport, Tasmania.

== History ==
In April 2021 Rauma Marine Constructions signed a contract with Spirit of Tasmania for the construction of two ships, the Spirit of Tasmania IV and Spirit of Tasmania V. Construction commenced on 20 December 2022 with a steel-cutting ceremony. It was launched on 19 July 2024 by the Governor of Tasmania, Barbara Baker.

The two ferries will replace the Spirit of Tasmania I and Spirit of Tasmania II. Because of delays around the construction of an upgraded wharf at Devonport, the vessel was not scheduled to enter service until July 2026. It was handed over by the builder in June 2025. It arrived in Leith, Scotland in November 2025 for a further period of storage to avoid being stranded in Baltic Sea ice.

Spirit of Tasmania V left Leith in March 2026 on its seven-week voyage to Australia. It is due to enter service on 31 October 2026.
