= Spirit of Tasmania IV =

Bass Strait cargo ferry operated by Spirit of Tasmania

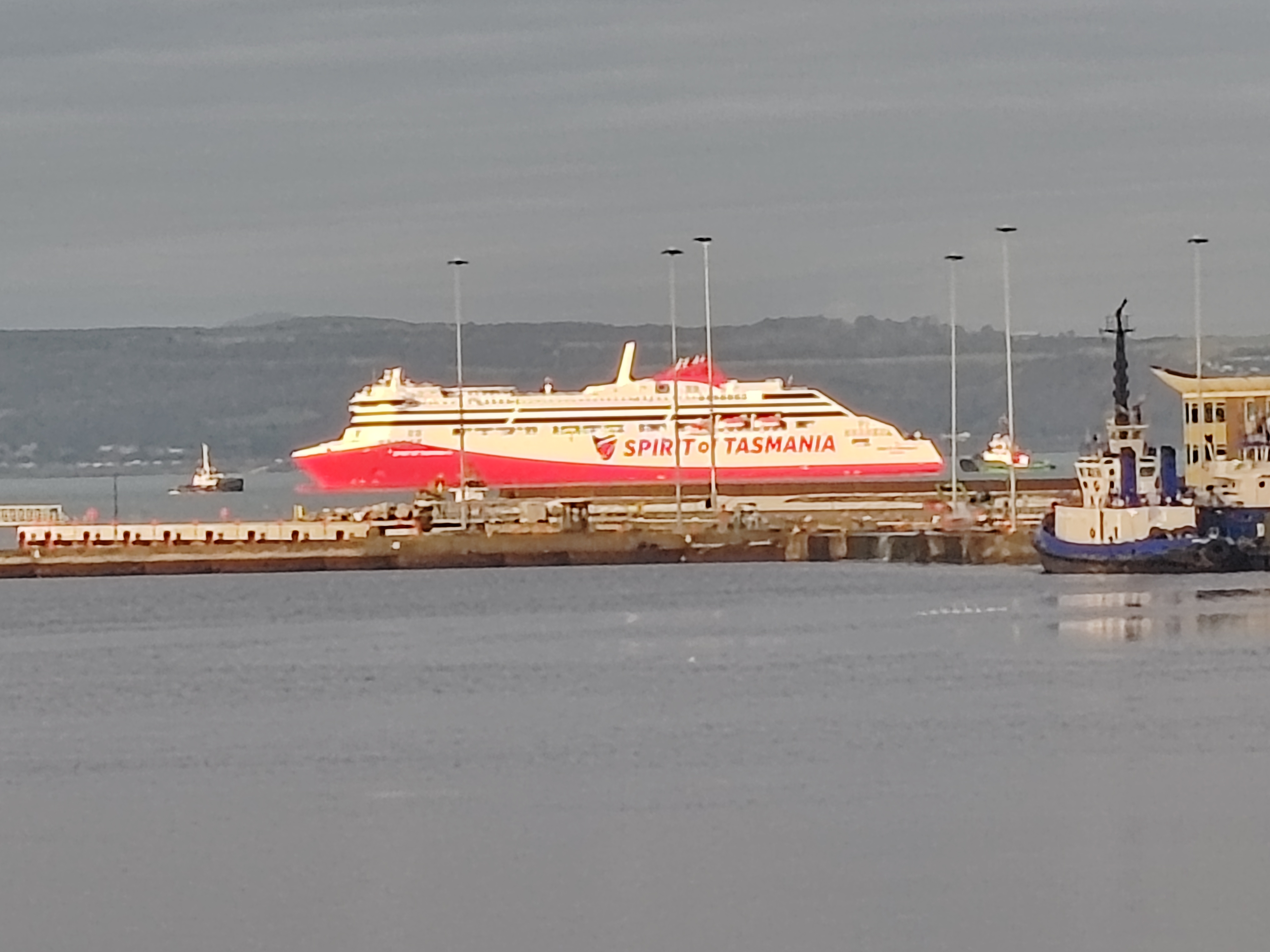
- Spirit of Tasmania IV on the Firth of Forth in December 2024

History
- Name: Spirit of Tasmania IV
- Owner: Spirit of Tasmania
- Operator: Spirit of Tasmania
- Port of registry: Devonport
- Route: Devonport–Geelong
- Ordered: April 2021
- Builder: Rauma Marine Constructions, Rauma, Finland
- Yard number: 6009
- Laid down: 28 October 2022
- Launched: 27 October 2023
- Maiden voyage: June 2024
- In service: 31 October 2026
- Identification: IMO number: 9936587
- Status: in service

General characteristics
- Class & type: Roll-on/roll-off ferry
- Tonnage: 47,994 GT; 6,400 DWT
- Length: 212 m (695 ft 6 in)
- Beam: 31 m (102 ft)
- Installed power: 4 × Wärtsilä 9L46DF (4 × 10,305 kW)
- Speed: 31.5 knots (58.3 km/h; 36.2 mph) maximum speed, 26 knots service speed
- Capacity: 1,800 passengers; 4,098 lanemeters

Spirit of Tasmania IV is a roll-on/roll-off ferry built by Rauma Marine Constructions in Rauma, Finland. It is to be operated by Spirit of Tasmania in Australia on the Bass Strait ferry route between Geelong, Victoria and Devonport, Tasmania.

== History ==
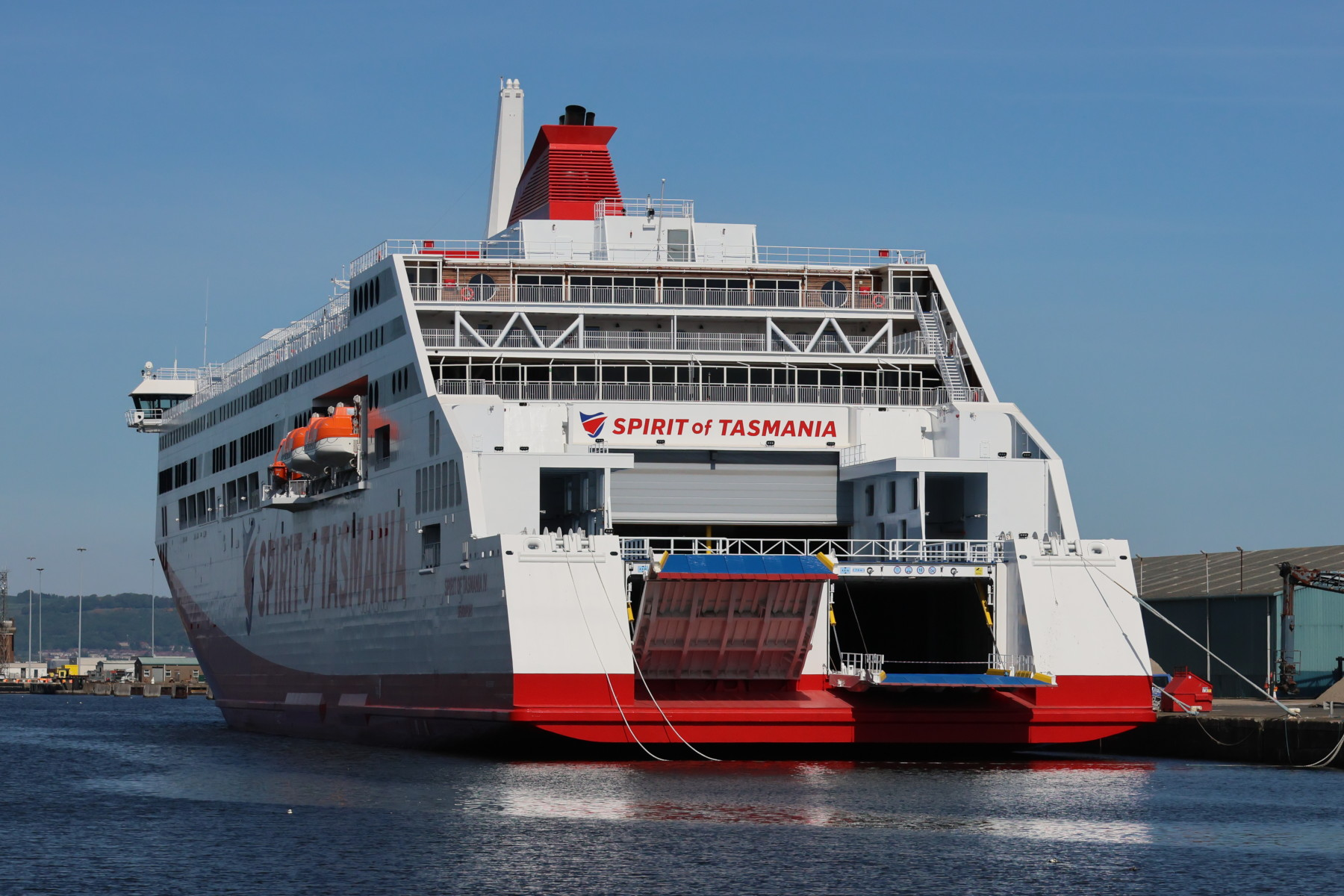
Spirit Of Tasmania IV docked in Leith, Scotland in May 2025

In April 2021 Rauma signed a contract with Spirit of Tasmania for the construction of two ships, the Spirit of Tasmania IV and Spirit of Tasmania V. Construction commenced on 28 February 2022 with a steel-cutting ceremony. The keel was laid on 28 October 2022. It will be the first ferry on the Bass Strait route to use LNG fuel. The two ferries will replace the Spirit of Tasmania I and Spirit of Tasmania II.

The ship commenced sea trials in June 2024. In September 2024, it was handed over by Rauma to Spirit of Tasmania. The ferry was originally due to arrive in Tasmania in late 2024. Due to Finland's cold winters and pack ice, in November 2024 it moved to the Port of Leith, Edinburgh, Scotland for ongoing storage while attempts were made to lease it to another operator in the interim.

Berthing costs in Leith were reported to be about A$47,000 per week.

On 26 May 2025 Spirit IV was due to leave for Tasmania, but both new vessels had problems with their liquefied natural gas systems, and could not leave until the issue was rectified.

It departed Leith in June 2025 arriving in Hobart in August for final fitting out.

== Wharf issues ==
Because of delays around the construction of an upgraded wharf at Devonport, the vessel is not scheduled to enter service until October 2026. The wharfs' construction cost was $90 million, but by 2025 had been revised up to $495 million.
