= MS Ilos =

Passenger/vehicle ferry built in 1975

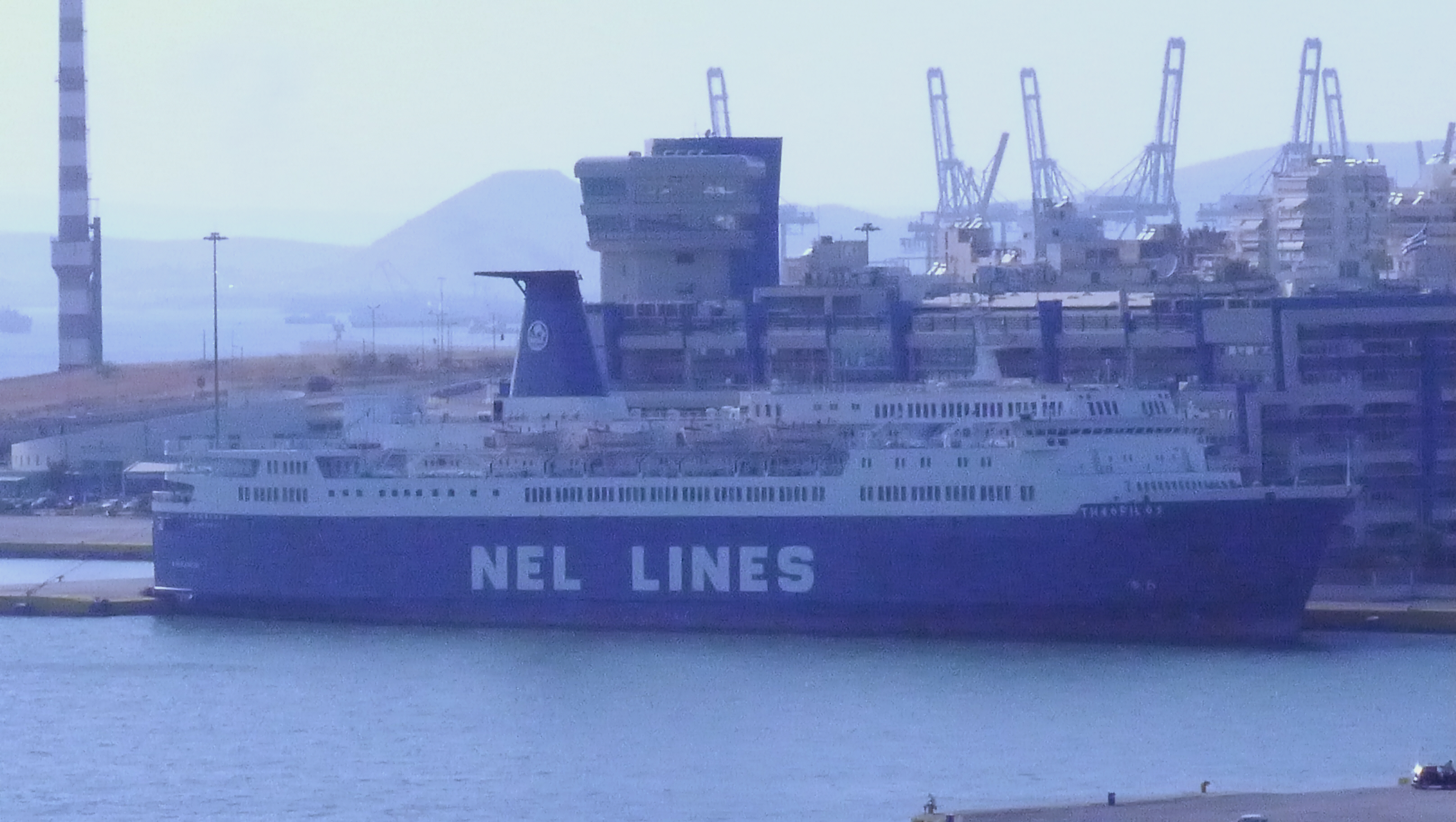
- Theofilos at Piraeus, Greece in 2012

History
- Name: 1975–1985: Nils Holgersson; 1985–1994: Abel Tasman; 1994–1995: Pollux; 1995–2022: Theofilos; 2022: Ilos
- Owner: 1975–1985: TT-Line; 1985–1994: TT-Line Company / Government of Tasmania; 1994–1995: Ventouris Ferries; 1995–2019: NEL Lines (Maritime Company of Lesvos); 2019–2022: ANEN Lines
- Operator: 1975–1985: TT-Line; 1985–1994: TT-Line Company / Spirit of Tasmania; 1994–1995: Ventouris Ferries; 1995–2015: NEL Lines
- Port of registry: 1975–1985: Lübeck, Germany; 1985–1994: Devonport, Australia; 1994–1995: Piraeus, Greece; 1995–2020: Mytilene, Greece; 2020–2022: Lomé, Togo
- Route: Former: Piraeus – Chios – Mytilene – Lemnos – Thessaloniki; Former: Igoumenitsa – Bari; Former: Devonport – Melbourne (Bass Strait); Former: Travemünde – Trelleborg
- Ordered: 1973
- Builder: Werft Nobiskrug; Rendsburg, Germany
- Yard number: 682
- Laid down: 1974
- Launched: 26 October 1974
- Completed: April 1975
- Acquired: 1995 (by NEL Lines)
- Maiden voyage: May 1975
- In service: 1975
- Out of service: 2014
- Identification: IMO number: 7362108; Call sign: SWJC; MMSI number: 239369000
- Fate: Scrapped at Aliağa, Turkey in May 2022
- Status: broken up

General characteristics
- Class & type: Custom Nobiskrug Ro-Pax Ferry
- Tonnage: 19,212 GT (originally 12,528 GT); 3,472 DWT
- Length: 148.88 m (488 ft 5 in) (overall) / 136.00 m (446 ft 2 in) (waterline)
- Beam: 23.50 m (77 ft 1 in)
- Draught: 6.10 m (20 ft 0 in)
- Depth: 8.00 m (26 ft 3 in)
- Decks: 9
- Ramps: Bow visor and stern vehicle loading ramps
- Ice class: 1A
- Installed power: 2 × SEMT Pielstick 16PC2-5V main diesel engines (total 15,300 kW / 20,800 hp)
- Propulsion: 2 × controllable pitch propellers
- Speed: 19.5 knots (36.1 km/h; 22.4 mph) (service) / 21.0 knots (38.9 km/h; 24.2 mph) (max)
- Capacity: 1,660 passengers (860 berths / cabins); 440 cars or 810 lane metres for freight
- Crew: 60–90

Theofilos was a 148.88-metre Ro-Pax passenger ferry historically operated by NEL Lines (Maritime Company of Lesvos). Built in 1975 by Werft Nobiskrug in Rendsburg, Germany, as Nils Holgersson for TT-Line, she later served as Abel Tasman across Bass Strait in Australia before being acquired by Ventouris Ferries in 1994 as Pollux. In 1995, she was purchased by NEL Lines, renamed Theofilos, and served as the flagship connecting Piraeus and Thessaloniki to the North Aegean islands of Chios and Mytilene. Following years of lay-up in Drapetsona and Elefsina after NEL's financial troubles, she was sold for scrap and broken up at Aliağa, Turkey, in 2022 under the shortened transit name Ilos.

== History ==
MS Theofilos was a passenger/vehicle ferry built at Nobiskrug in Rendsburg for the TT-Line as the Nils Holgersson for the Travemünde - Trelleborg route in 1975 along with her sister Peter Pan . In 1985 it was purchased by TT-Line Company after the Australian National Line announced it would be withdrawing from the Bass Strait run. The Federal Government gave the Tasmanian Government a grant to buy a suitable ferry. The Nils Holgersson was purchased from TT-Line and renamed Abel Tasman. An option to buy her sister ship Peter Pan one year later was not taken up.

The ship was named after Abel Tasman, the first known European to reach Van Diemen's Land. She first went back to her builder's yard for a refit, and for a large box-like structure to be added to the stern of the ship for the crew, because the Australian maritime union rules did not allow the crew to be under the car deck, which is where the crew cabins were. She left Rendsburg on 22 April 1985, but two days later she was stopped by an industrial dispute with the stewards. She first went to Brunsbuttel, but had to continue through the Kiel Canal, and into Kiel where she docked. The Tasmanian Government sent police to West Germany to end the dispute and get the ship underway, but on arrival the police were powerless in West Germany. So the Tasmanian Government had to change laws to empower them to resolve the problem, and she resumed her trip and left Kiel on 18 May 1985.

She then sailed to Australia, going straight to Devonport and not via Queensland and New South Wales as had been planned. She started on the Devonport–Melbourne route on 1 June 1985 from Melbourne. Her former Captain Rudolf Schonfeldt, sailed with the ship to Australia from Germany to advise the crew, unfamiliar with the new ship.

In 1993, she was laid up following the arrival of the much larger Spirit of Tasmania. In 1994, she was sold to Ventouris Ferries and renamed Pollux. In 1995 she was again sold, this time to the Maritime Company of Lesvos and operated by Nel Lines, renamed Theofilos for the Piraeus–Chios–Mytilini route with calls sometimes in Thessaloniki and Limnos.

On 28 June 2008, Theofilos ran aground on a reef of rocks of the island of Oinousses about 10 nm from the island of Chios. She suffered serious damage to her port side hull, a 15–20 metres slash causing flooding of a water tight compartment, she subsequently developed a 2.5 degree list. The ship was repaired, with an estimated cost to Nel Lines underwriter, The West of England Shipowners of €5 million. Once the repairs were completed, she returned to normal service on 16 May 2009.

In January 2018 Theofilos was laid up at Elefsina Greece following her owners declaring bankruptcy. On October 31, 2019, Theofilos was sold to ANEN Lines for about 380.000 Euros. From January 2020 to May 2022 she was under the flag of Togo. The ship was laid-up in terrible condition from 2020 in Perama, Greece and after two years was sold for scrap in Aliağa, Turkey under the name Ilos in 2022. She left Greece for Aliağa on May 13, 2022.

== Sister ship ==
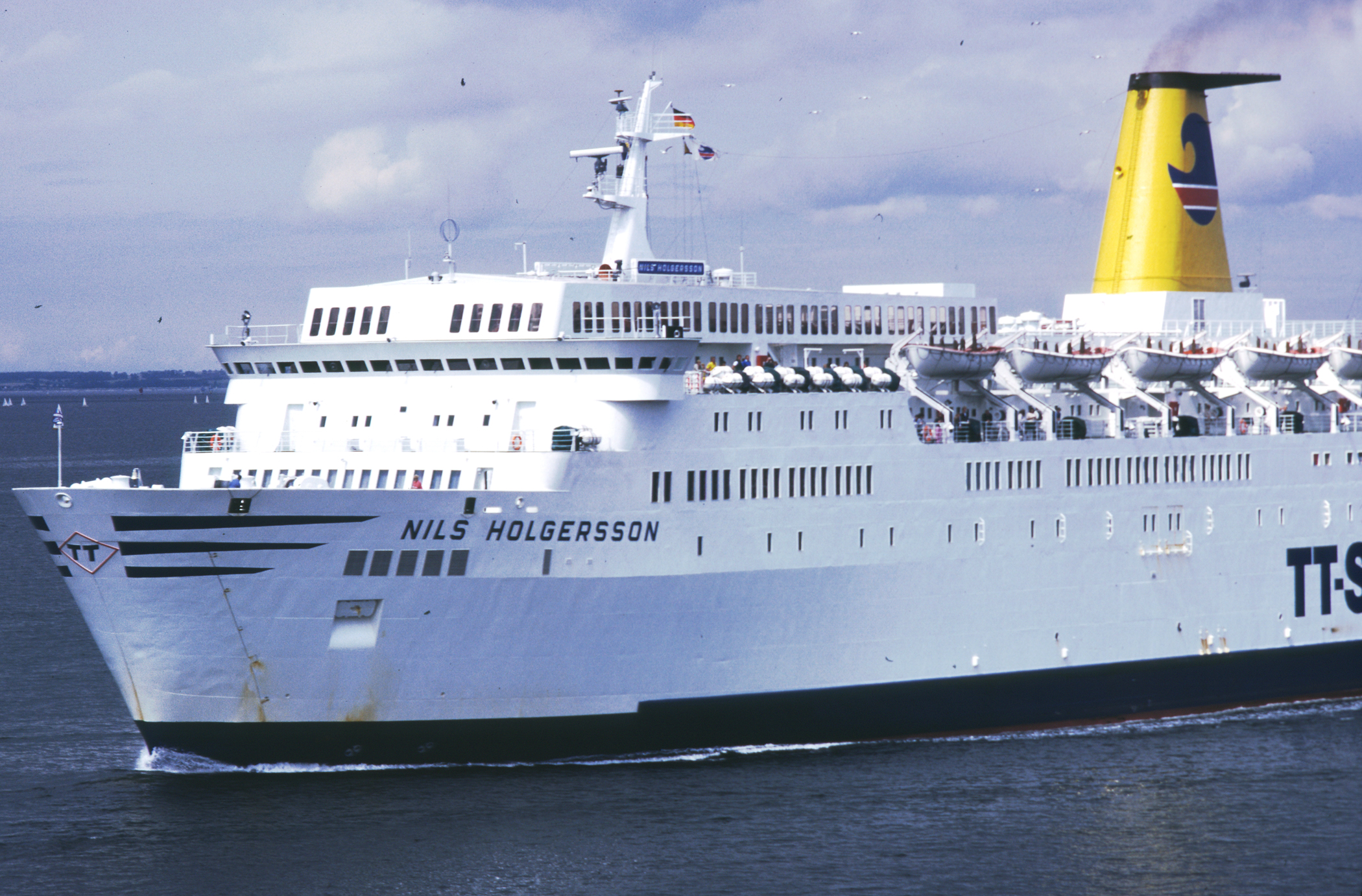
Nils Holgersson at Travemünde in 1981

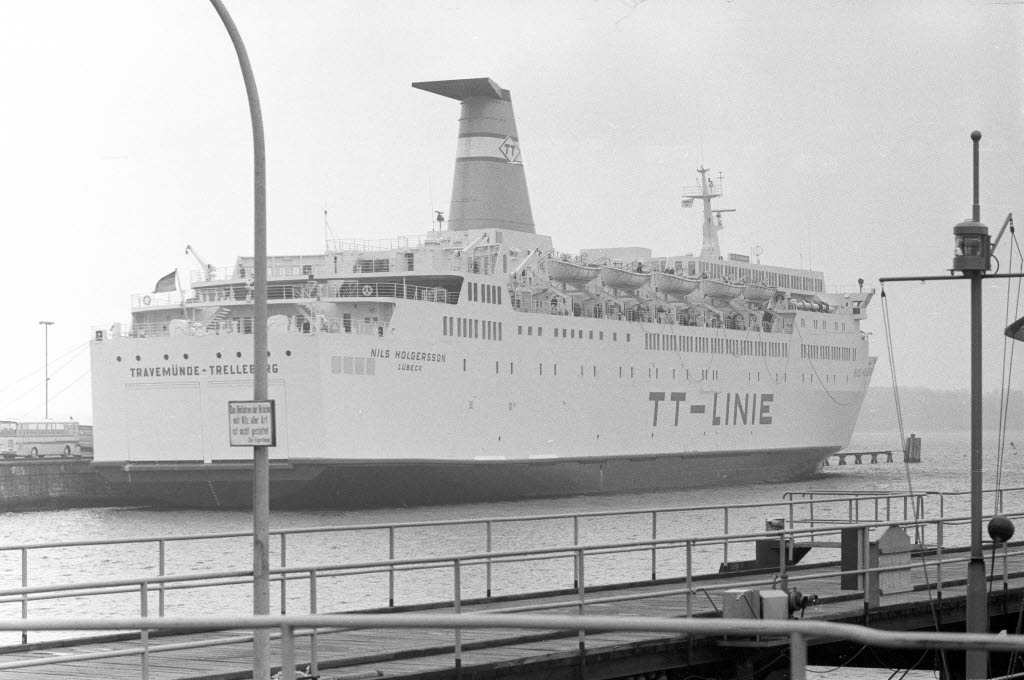
Theofilos as Nils Holgersson in April 1975

In 1986 MS Peter Pan (2) was renamed Robin Hood to free the name for the larger Peter Pan (3) (later Spirit of Tasmania). In 1987, she was sold to Minoan Lines and renamed Fedra. In 2004 she was transferred over to Hellas Ferries, then sold to Sea Hawk Marine, operated by Comanav. Later that year she was renamed Guido for a short time. She was then bought by El Salam Maritime and renamed Ouzoud. She then operated under Comanav for six years on the 48-hour route from Genoa (Italy) – Tangier (Morocco). In January 2010, it was reported that Ouzoud has been sold to India for scrap.

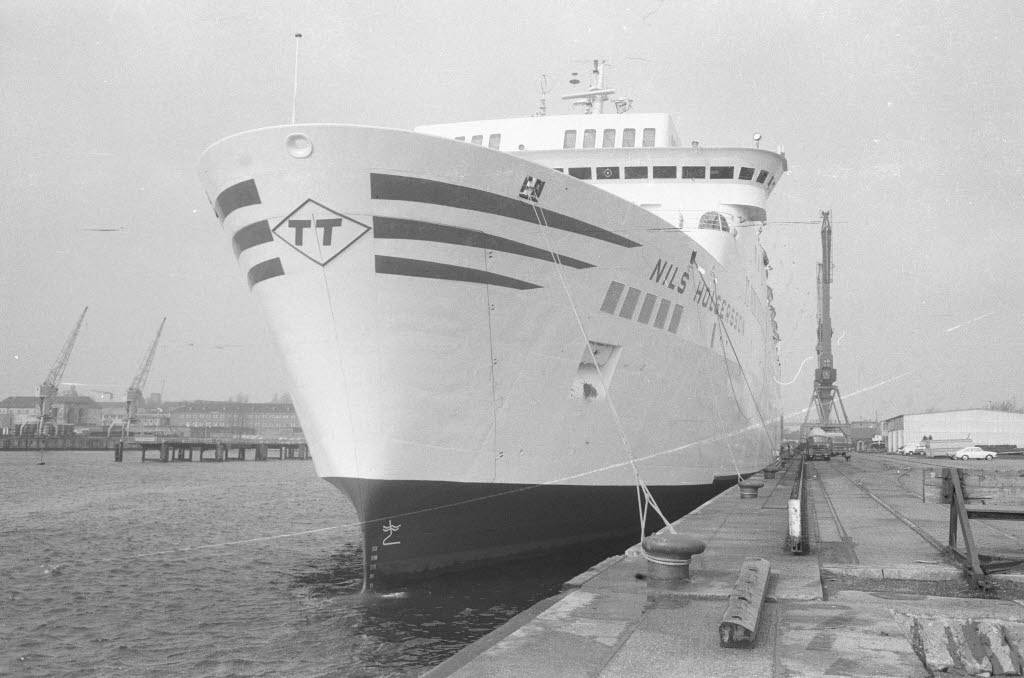
Nills Holgersson in 1975

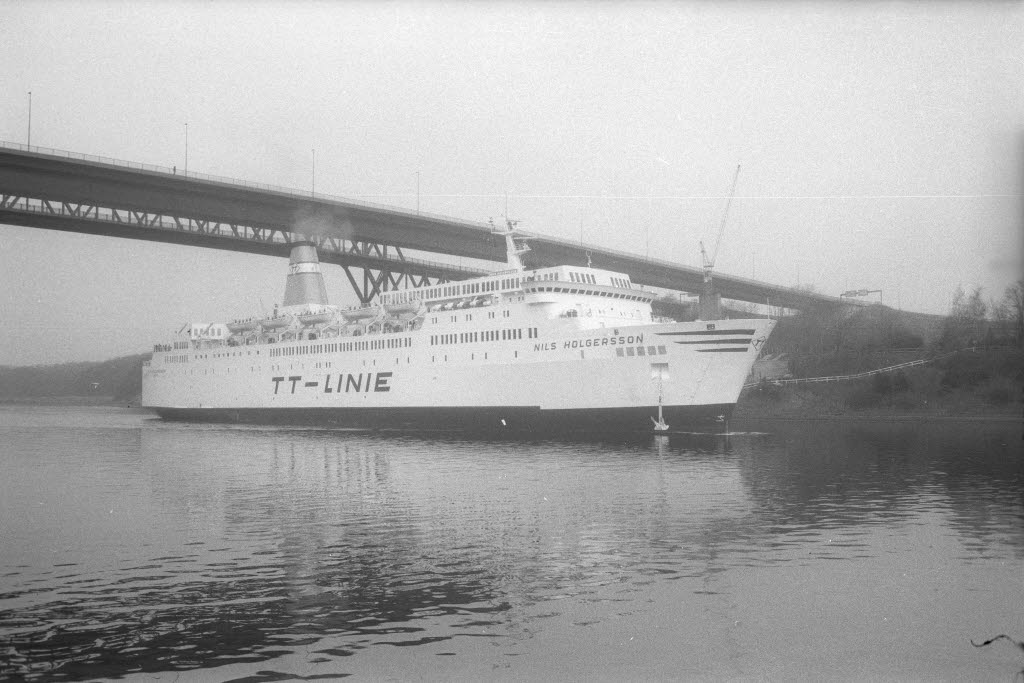
Nils Holgersson in 1977
