= Spirit of Tasmania =

Operators of the ferry service between Tasmania and Victoria

TT-Line Company T/A Spirit of Tasmania

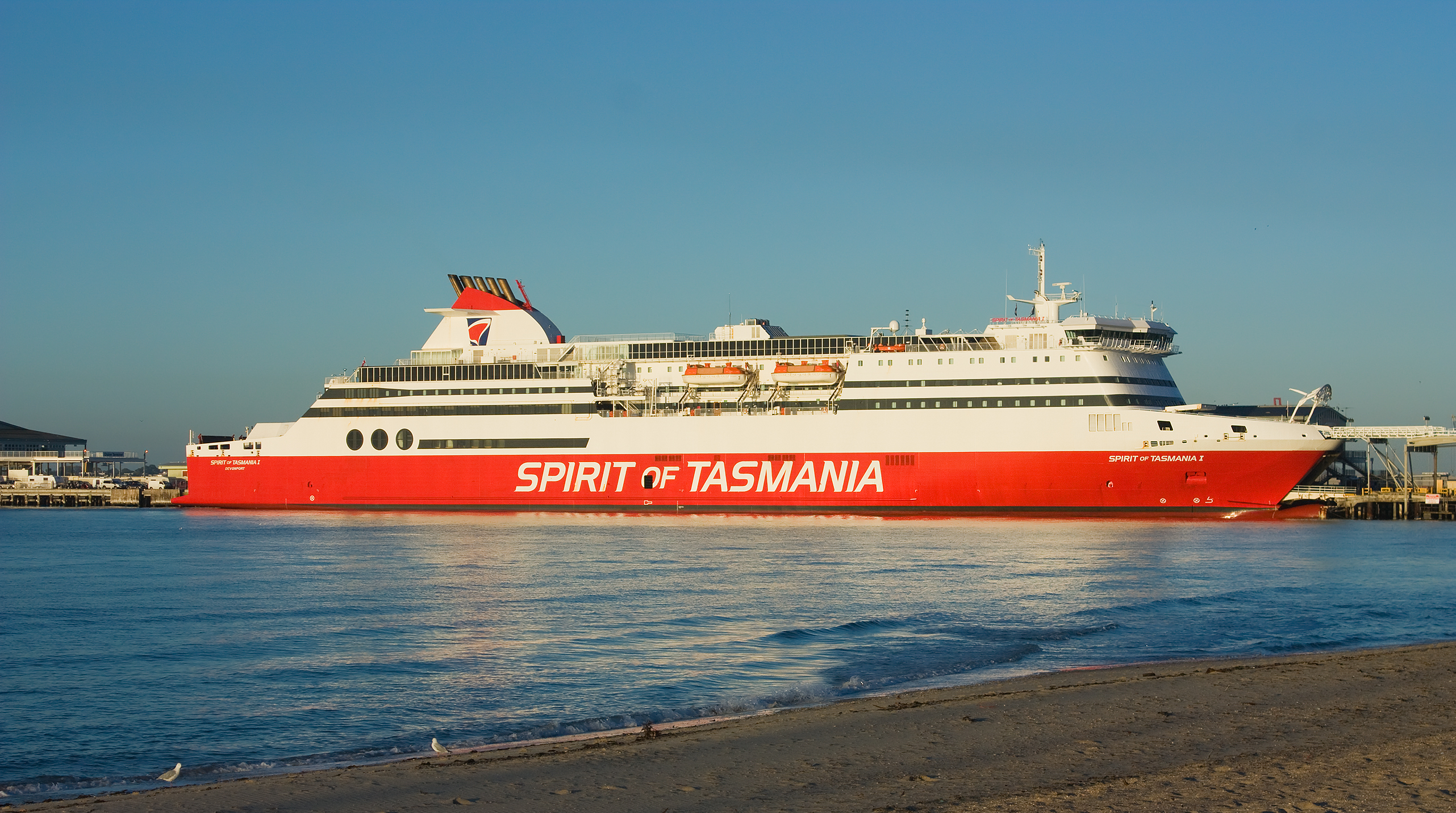
- Spirit of Tasmania I at Station Pier, Melbourne
- Type: Government Business Enterprise
- Industry: Transport
- Founded: 1985
- Headquarters: Devonport, Tasmania, Australia
- Key people: Kerry Vincent (Minister for Infrastructure and Transport); Chris Carbone (CEO)
- Products: Ferries, passenger transportation, freight transportation, holidays, business travel
- Revenue: A$244.6 million (June 2018)
- Net income: A$44.4 million (June 2018)
- Number of employees: 500+
- Parent: Government of Tasmania
- Website: www.spiritoftasmania.com.au/

TT-Line Company Pty Ltd, trading as Spirit of Tasmania, is a Tasmanian Government-owned business enterprise that has provided Bass Strait ferry services between mainland Australia and Tasmania since July 1993. Navigating Bass Strait, Spirit of Tasmania ferries cover a distance of 242 nautical miles (448 km; 278 mi) between Geelong, Victoria and Devonport, Tasmania. Each journey takes approximately 9-11 hours, and are typically overnight crossings.

Currently, the TT-Line Company's fleet includes two Finnish-built vessels: Spirit of Tasmania IV and Spirit of Tasmania V. These ships commenced commercial operation in October 2026, operating from a new Devonport berth, Spirit Quay, replacing the ships Spirit of Tasmania I and Spirit of Tasmania II which had serviced the route since 2002. Between 2003 and 2006, Spirit of Tasmania also operated a service between Sydney and Devonport using the former Spirit of Tasmania III.

In addition to passenger services, Spirit of Tasmania provides sea freight and roll on/roll off transport for vehicles, making it a vital link between Tasmania and the mainland. Since 1996, fares have been subsidised through the Bass Strait Passenger Vehicle Equalisation Scheme, which aims to make ferry travel more affordable for passengers and promote economic activity between the regions.

The shipping line, wholly owned by the Government of Tasmania, was initially a part of the Tasmanian Government's Department of Transport. It became a government business enterprise in 1993, adopting the name Spirit of Tasmania in August of that year.

== History ==
=== 1985–1992 ===
TT-Line (Tasmania) was formed in 1985 following the announcement that the Australian National Line (ANL) would no longer operate a service across Bass Strait with Empress of Australia.

After the cessation of ANL operations to Tasmania, the Tasmanian Government's Department of Transport began a replacement ferry service, purchasing the West German ferry Nils Holgersson for $26 million. That amount was offset by a payment from the Australian federal government in compensation for placing the environmentally-sensitive Gordon River off-limits to Hydro Tasmania power generation schemes. The Nils Holgersson (3) was renamed Abel Tasman on 21 April 1985, and set sail for Australia, she arrived in Devonport on 20 June and began operating on 1 July 1985 from Melbourne's Station Pier.

=== 1993–2001 ===
In 1993, TT-Line Tasmania replaced the ageing Abel Tasman with another ex TT-Line ferry. The new ship, Peter Pan (3), had replaced the former Nils Holgersson (3) (now Abel Tasman) on the Travemünde to Trelleborg route in Germany in 1986. The ship, which was delivered to Lloyd Werft shipyard in September 1993 and was renamed Spirit of Tasmania, cost the Government $150 million. The ferry left Germany on 5 October and arrived in Devonport 12 November.

On 1 November 1993, operation of the service was transferred from the Tasmanian Department of Transport to TT-Line Pty Ltd, a government business enterprise wholly owned by the Tasmanian Government.

Spirit of Tasmania made her first commercial crossing of Bass Strait on the night of 29 November 1993 and on that morning Abel Tasman was laid-up and offered for sale, which was completed in April 1994, to Ventouris Ferries as Pollux.

While Spirit of Tasmania was dry-docked in 1997, the TT-Line chartered a large multi-hull ferry, Incat 045 (now Condor Rapide), from Incat, dubbing her Tascat. She was used for two weeks as an experiment. In the peak season of 1997/98. TT-Line chartered Incat 046 to operate as Devil Cat from the old SeaCat Tasmania terminal in George Town to Station Pier. TT-Line repeated this over the 1998/99 peak season with the new Incat 050 Devil Cat (also marketed under the name Devil Cat).

In September 1999, Spirit of Tasmania was forced out of action for two weeks due to fuel contamination, and TT-Line chartered the Incat 030 HSC Condor 10 which at the time was laid up in New Zealand as Lynx. Once TT-Line arranged for the charter she immediately departed New Zealand and arrived in Tasmania two days later, and entered service to cover for Spirit of Tasmania. Over the 1999/00 summer season, TT-Line again charted a fast craft while the former Devil Cat Incat 046 was used on the Georgetown-Melbourne route during this peak period for three successive years.

=== 2002–2006 ===
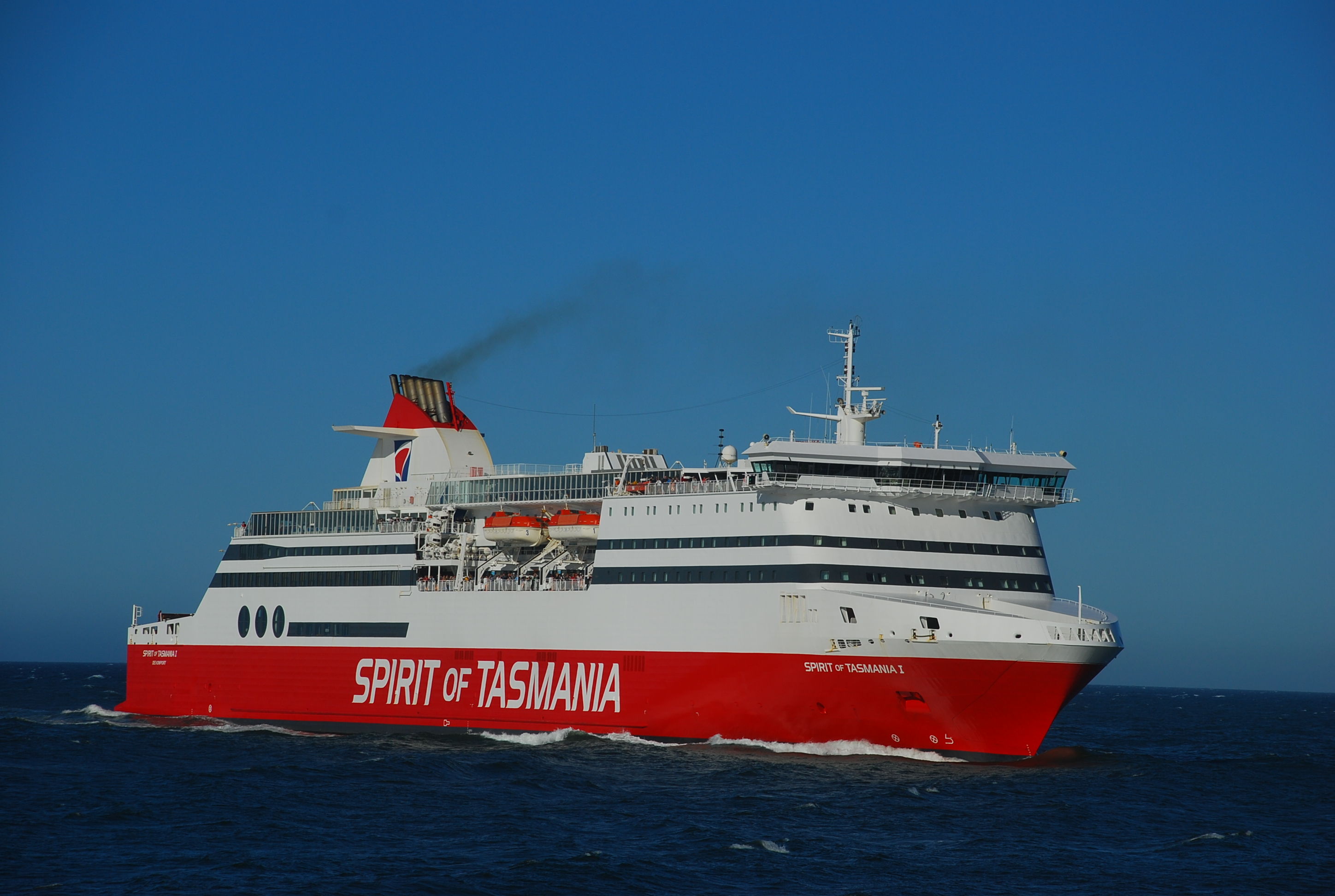
Spirit of Tasmania I enters her port of registry Devonport

In 2002, the Tasmanian Government and TT-Line announced that they would be replacing Devil Cat and Spirit of Tasmania with two Finnish built monohull ferries Superfast III and Superfast IV later that year from Superfast Ferries. Both were handed over at the Neorion shipyard on the island of Syros where they had been refitted. Superfast III was renamed Spirit of Tasmania II and departed on 6 July and Superfast IV renamed Spirit of Tasmania I and departed 7 July. They set off for Australia both arriving in Hobart 29 July where the final touches were put into place. After public inspections at Hobart, Melbourne and Devonport, the two new ships set sail on 1 September Spirit of Tasmania I from Devonport and Spirit of Tasmania II from Melbourne.

Earlier that day Spirit of Tasmania arrived in Melbourne for the last time, having crossed Bass Strait 2,849 times and carried a total of 2.3 million passengers, 807,000 cars and 185,000 containers. Spirit of Tasmania departed Melbourne just before midnight on 5 September headed for Sydney where she arrived on 7 September. In late December it was announced that the ship had been sold to Fjord Line.

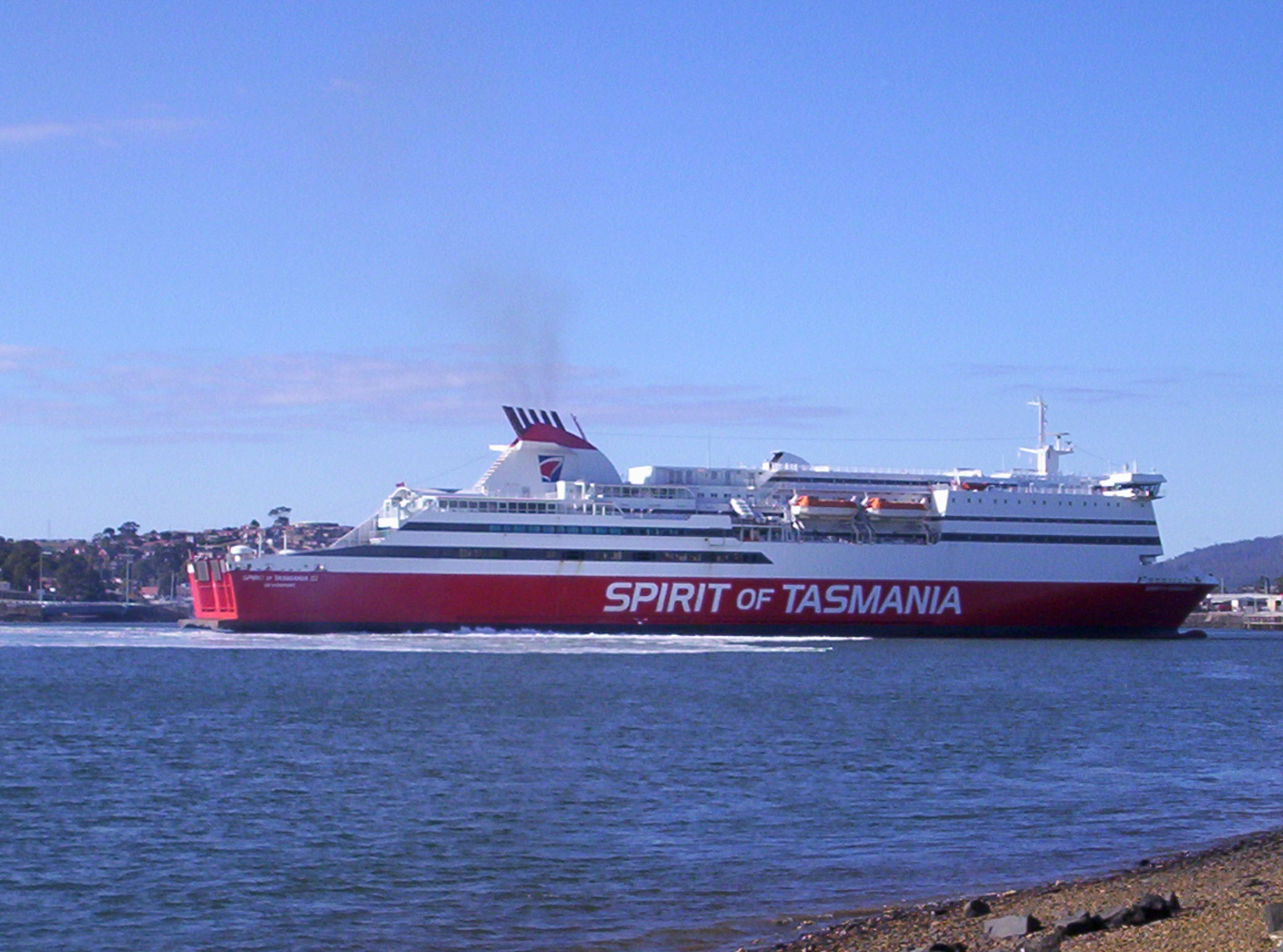
Spirit of Tasmania III on the Mersey River, Devonport

In March 2003, it was announced that TT-Line would begin operating a third ship, Spirit of Tasmania III, from Devonport to Sydney in early 2004. The last service from Sydney to Tasmania operated by Australian Trader had ceased in 1976. The new ship was also ex Superfast Ferries having been built as Superfast II in 1995. Superfast II was handed over to TT-Line 30 September and went to the Nerion yard for refitting after the works and renaming to Spirit of Tasmania III, she set off on the evening of 10 October. She arrived in Hobart on 30 October berthing No. 6 Macquarie wharf for more fitting-out to be done. Spirit of Tasmania III set out for a voyage from Hobart to Devonport with 500 people aboard. She stayed in Devonport for a day and then moved on to Melbourne then to Sydney. Spirit of Tasmania III debuted on the Sydney to Devonport run on 13 January 2004.

On 5 June 2006, the Tasmanian government announced that the Sydney to Devonport service would cease on 28 August and the ship sold. It was announced 11 July 2006 that Spirit of Tasmania III had been sold to Corsica Ferries; she has now been renamed Mega Express Four.

=== 2017–present ===
In December 2017, TT-Line announced it planned to replace its two existing ferries with new builds. The new vessels were to have a passenger capacity increase of 43% and freight capacity increase of 39% over the existing ferries. In January 2018, it was announced that the German Flensburger Schiffbau-Gesellschaft (FSG) would build the two new vessels, with the first expected to enter service in 2021.

In February 2020, it was announced that the contract with FSG had been mutually cancelled. A new contract for construction of the new ships was signed with Rauma Marine Constructions of Finland. In July 2020, it was announced that the proposed contract with Rauma Marine Constructions would not proceed, due to uncertainty arising from the COVID-19 pandemic.

In 2021, the Tasmanian government announced negotiations had resumed with Rauma Marine, with the contract being signed in April 2021. It was expected in late 2022 that the new vessels, Spirit of Tasmania IV and Spirit of Tasmania V would arrive in Australia in late 2024 and early 2025 respectively.

On 23 October 2022, TT-Line moved its Victorian terminal from Station Pier to a new facility at Spirit of Tasmania Quay, Geelong.

In June 2024 Spirit IV commenced sea trials. In September 2024, it was handed over by Rauma to TT-Line.

On 14 August 2024 company chairman Michael Grainger resigned under pressure from the government over delays and cost blow-outs in the new ferries berths.

In October 2024 it was reported that because of delays in the construction of an upgraded wharf at Devonport, the Spirit IV was then scheduled to enter service in July 2026. The wharfs' construction cost was $90 million, but by 2024 had been revised up to $495 million.

In November 2024, due to Finland's cold winters and pack ice, Spirit of Tasmania IV was moved to the Port of Leith, Edinburgh, Scotland for storage while attempts were made to lease it to another operator in the interim. Berthing costs in Leith were reported to be about A$47,000 per week.

On 26 May 2025 Spirit IV was due to leave for Tasmania, but both new vessels had problems with their liquefied natural gas systems, and could not leave until the issue was rectified.

In June 2025, Spirit of Tasmania V was handed over by the builder to TT Line while Spirit of Tasmania IV arrived in Hobart in August 2025.

In September 2025 it emerged that $9 million was needed to replace fenders at the new wharf at Devonport and strengthen Spirit IV and Spirit V as TT-Line has requested incorrect specifications to the wharf in 2023.

In November 2025, it was reported that Martin Thompson, the Auditor-General of Tasmania, had made an assessment that Spirit of Tasmania was insolvent as of August 2025 and had reported its board to the Australian Securities & Investments Commission. In response, the company's chairman Ken Kanofski stated that Spirit of Tasmania was solvent and state treasurer Eric Abetz guaranteed that it would provide government support for it to continue to pay its debts.

== Fleet ==
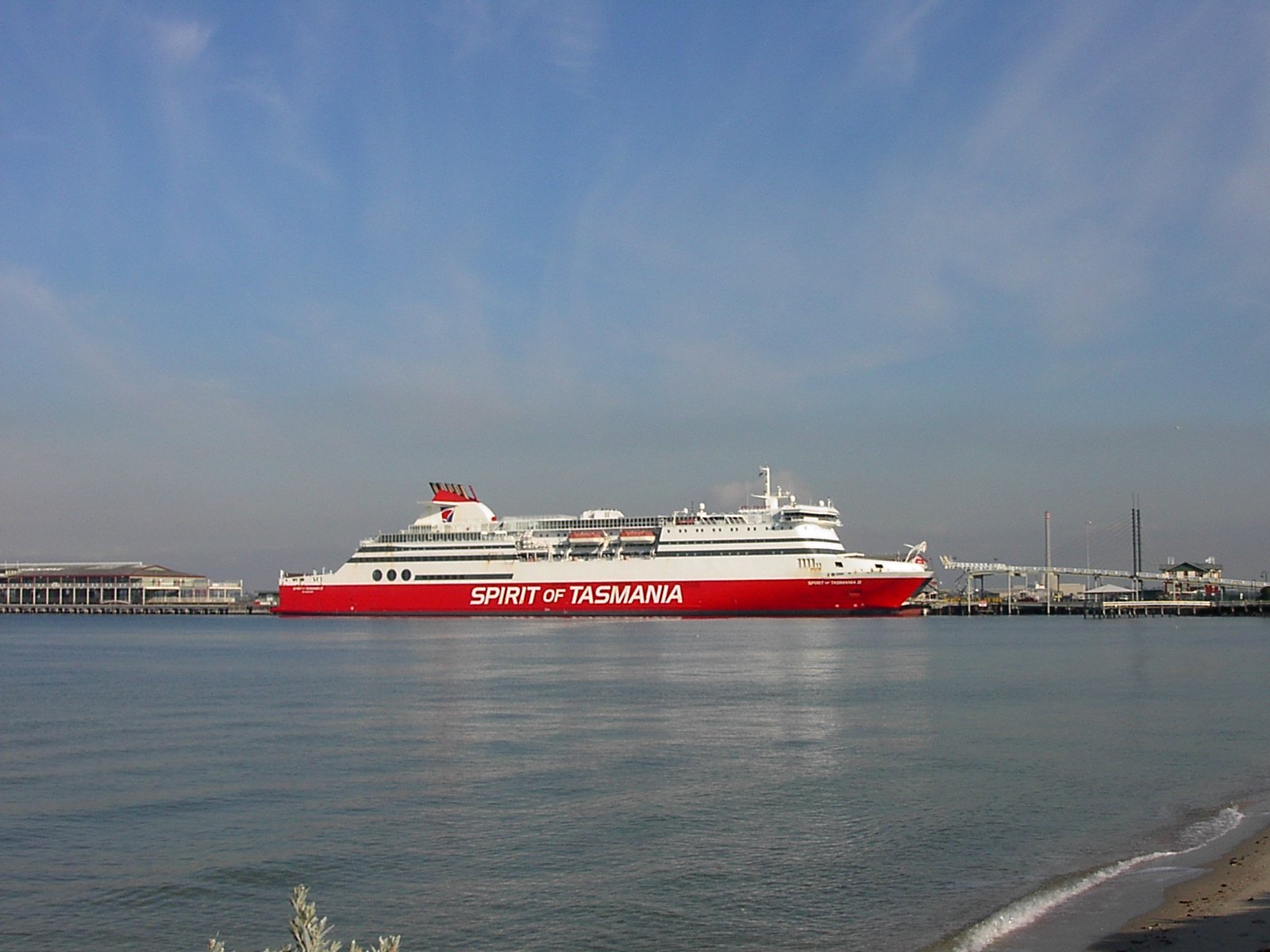
Spirit of Tasmania II at Station Pier, Melbourne

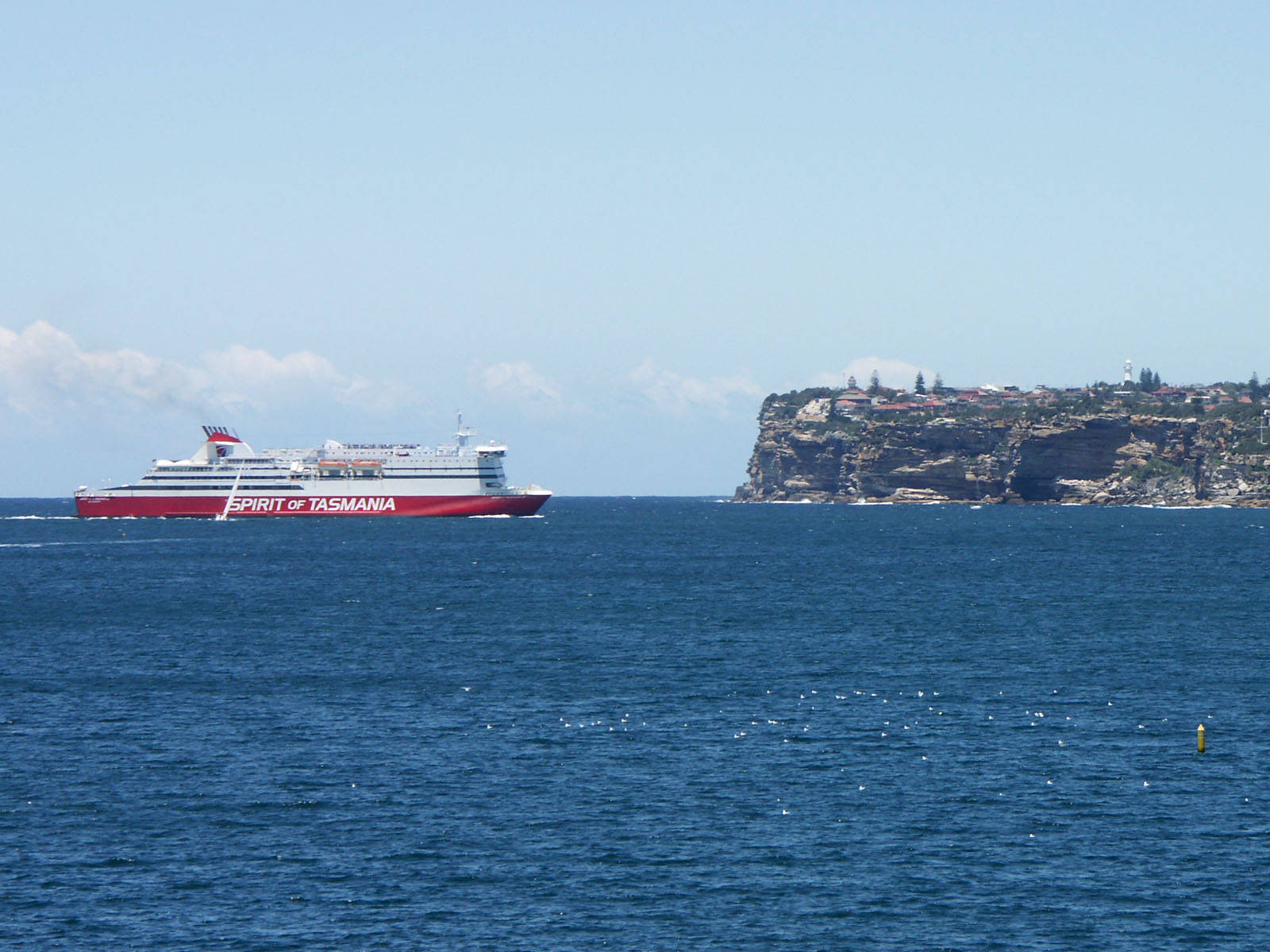
Spirit of Tasmania III entering Sydney Harbour

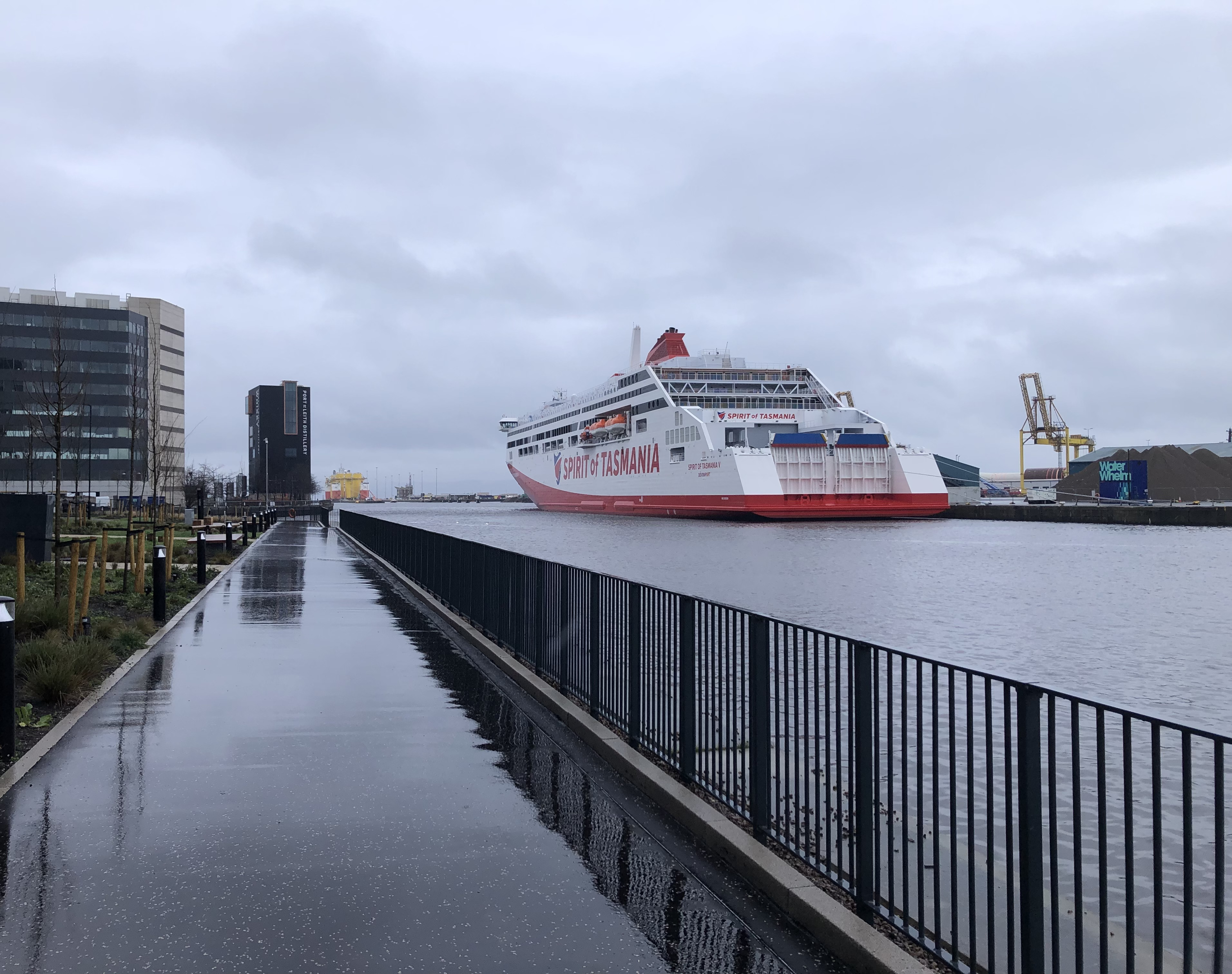
Spirit of Tasmania V docked at the Port of Leith

=== Current fleet ===
Ship	Flag	Built	Gross tonnage	Length	Width	Passengers	Cars	Knots
Spirit of Tasmania IV	(Australia)	September 14, 2024	48,000 GT	1,800				
Spirit of Tasmania V	(Australia)	June 26, 2025	48,000 GT	1,800				

=== Former ships ===
Ship	Years in service	Gross tonnage	Fate
Abel Tasman	1985–1994	19,212 GT	Since 1995 Theofilos of Nel lines (Greece), Sold for scrap as Ilos in Aliaga, Turkey in 2022
Spirit of Tasmania	1993–2002	31,356 GT	Since 2011 Princess Seaways of DFDS Seaways (Denmark)
Incat 046 Devil Cat	1997–2002	5,617 GT	2006-2021 T&T Express of Government of Trinidad and Tobago sank in 2021
Incat 045 Tascat	1997	5,007 GT	Since 2010 Condor Rapide of Condor Ferries (Guernsey)
Incat 050 Devil Cat	1998–1999	5,743 GT	Since 2009 Manannan of Isle of Man Steam Packet Company
Incat 030 Condor 10	1999	3,241 GT	Since 2011 Hanil Blue Narae of Hanil Express (Korea)
Spirit of Tasmania III	2003–2006	23,663 GT	Since 2006 Mega Express Four of Corsica Ferries (Italy)
Spirit of Tasmania I	2002–2026	29,338 GT	As of 2026 up for sale
Spirit of Tasmania II	2002–2026	29,338 GT	As of 2026 up for sale

== See also ==
- Bass Strait ferries
