= MS Spirit of Tasmania II =

Bass Strait ferry

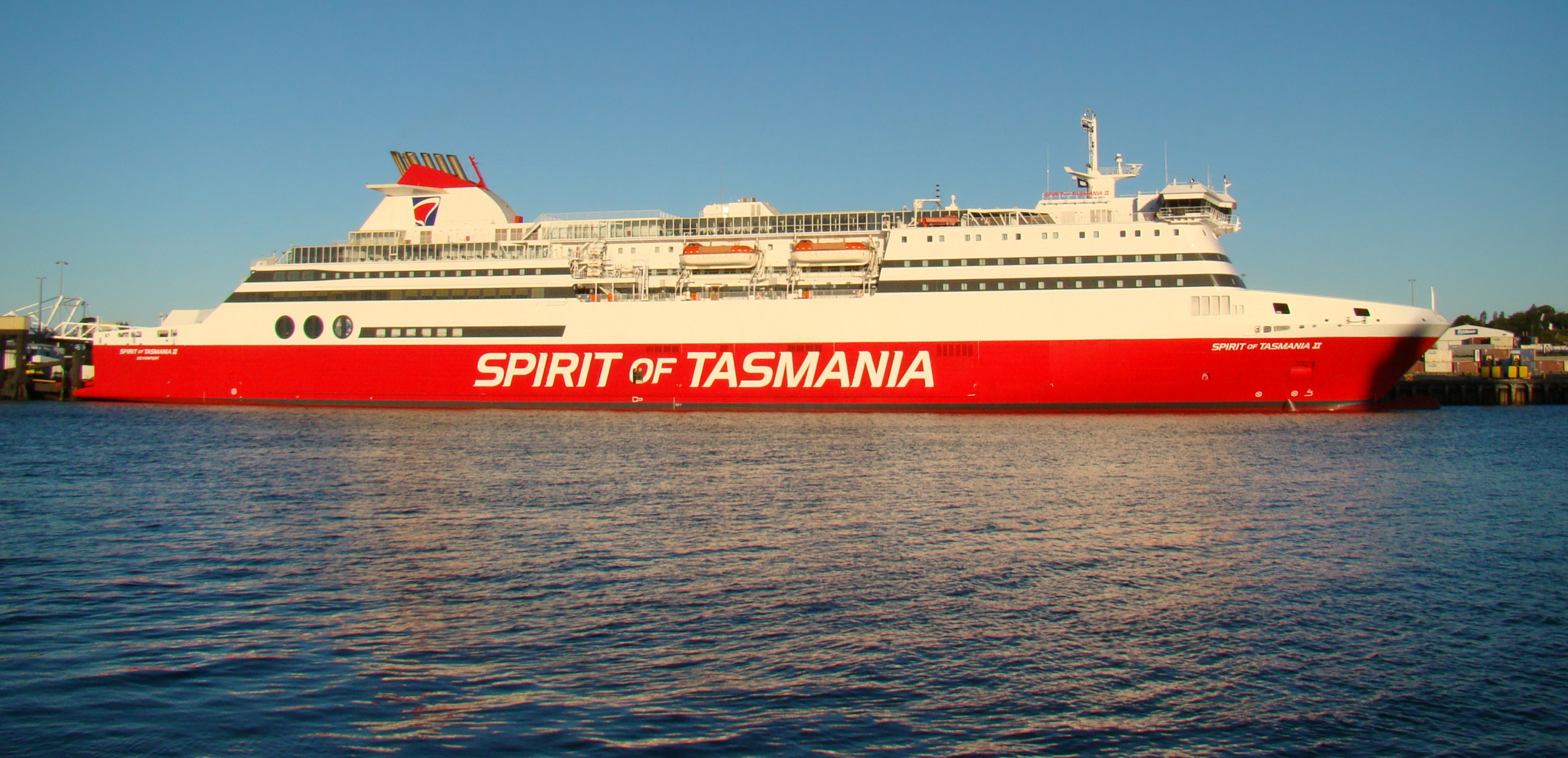
- Spirit of Tasmania II at port in Devonport, Tasmania

History
- Name: 1998–2002: Superfast III; 2002–present: Spirit of Tasmania II
- Owner: 1998–2002: Superfast Ferries; 2002 onwards: Spirit of Tasmania
- Operator: 1998–2002: Superfast Ferries; 2003–2006: Spirit of Tasmania
- Port of registry: 1998–2002: Patras, Greece; 2002 onwards: Devonport, Australia
- Route: 1998–2002: Patras–Ancona; 2002-2022: Melbourne–Devonport; 2022-2026: Geelong–Devonport
- Builder: Kvaerner Masa-Yards Turku New Shipyard, Finland
- Yard number: 1340
- Completed: 1998
- Identification: IMO number: 9158434; Call sign: VNSZ; MMSI number: 503433000
- Status: In service

General characteristics
- Class & type: Superfast III class fast ropax ferry
- Tonnage: 29,338 GT; 5,651 DWT
- Length: 194.33 m (637 ft 7 in)
- Beam: 25.00 m (82 ft)
- Draught: 6.55 m (21 ft 6 in)
- Installed power: 4 × Sulzer 16ZA40S diesels; 42,240 kW
- Speed: 30.8 knots (57.0 km/h; 35.4 mph) maximum speed
- Capacity: 1,400 passengers; 750 berths; 500 cars; 1,464 lanemeters

Spirit of Tasmania II is a roll-on/roll-off ferry, most recently operated by Spirit of Tasmania between Geelong and Devonport in Australia. Built in 1998 by Kvaerner Masa-Yards at Turku New Shipyard in Finland for Superfast Ferries as Superfast III, she was sailed for Spirit of Tasmania as the Spirit of Tasmania II between 2002 and 2026.

== Concept and construction ==
The Superfast III was the first ship of the second pair (the former pair being Superfast I and Superfast II) built for Superfast Ferries at Kvaerner Masa-Yards for its Adriatic Sea services from Patras to Ancona. She was a sister ship of Superfast IV.

== Amenities and deck layout ==
Spirit of Tasmania II has 11 decks, with 222 cabins.

- Decks 1 to 6 are used to hold cars and trucks. The for-end of Decks 1 and 2 are accessed via a ramp from deck 3 (The Aft-end space of the two decks houses the ship's machinery). Deck 6 holds cars using a hoistable platform.
- Deck 7 has cabins, a reception area, small movie theater, lounge bar, gaming lounge, gift shop, tourism bureau, main bar, two restaurants and a children's playroom.
- Deck 8 has cabins and an ocean recliner area.
- Deck 9 is mainly crew area.
- Deck 10 has a bar and disco area.
- Deck 11 has a helicopter landing pad.

== Service history ==
=== 1998–2002: Superfast III ===
The Superfast III entered service on 16 March 1998 on Superfast Ferries' Patras to Ancona service. On 1 November 1999 en route from Patras to Ancona a fire broke out in a freezer trailer on the vehicle deck, most likely in the electrical system. The ship's vehicle deck drenching system along with crew put the blaze out. All 307 passengers and 106 crew were evacuated and picked up by nearby ships.

The ship arrived back in Patras the day after the disaster, and investigations began. Fourteen dead bodies were found in a truck. These bodies were later identified as refugees from Kurdistan. After the investigations had concluded, the Superfast III set sail for the Blohm+Voss shipyards in Hamburg, Germany for repairs, arriving there on 3 December.

The repairs took 71 days during which 450 tons of steel, 84 km of cable, 1,200 m^{2} of insulation material and cladding were replaced, and a new tilting ramp and new public areas were installed. The cost to the underwriter (Attica Enterprises) was US$26 million. On 3 March she arrived back in Greece and once again operated on the Patras to Ancona route. In March 2002 the Superfast III was sold to Spirit of Tasmania.

=== 2002 onwards: Spirit of Tasmania II ===
Spirit of Tasmania took over the ship on 10 May 2002. Along with her sister ship Superfast IV, she was handed over at Patras. The two ships then sailed to the Neorion ship yard on the island of Syros. During the ship's dry docking, works such as painting the new livery and superstructure, as well as a general overhaul were carried out. At the yard she was renamed Spirit of Tasmania II. She subsequently sailed to Hobart, Tasmania, where she was refitted for her new service. On 1 September 2002 she entered service on the Melbourne to Devonport service.

Between 21 July and 8 August 2014 the ship was docked for maintenance at the Captain Cook Graving Dock in Sydney. In 2015 it was refurbished in Devonport.

On 13 January 2016, the ship broke from her moorings at Station Pier, Melbourne during a storm and was withdrawn for repairs. The ship was repaired and re-entered service on 17 January.

Spirit of Tasmania II and sistership Spirit of Tasmania I were replaced by the Spirit of Tasmania IV and Spirit of Tasmania V in October 2026.
