= Station Pier =

Historic pier on Port Phillip, in Port Melbourne, Victoria

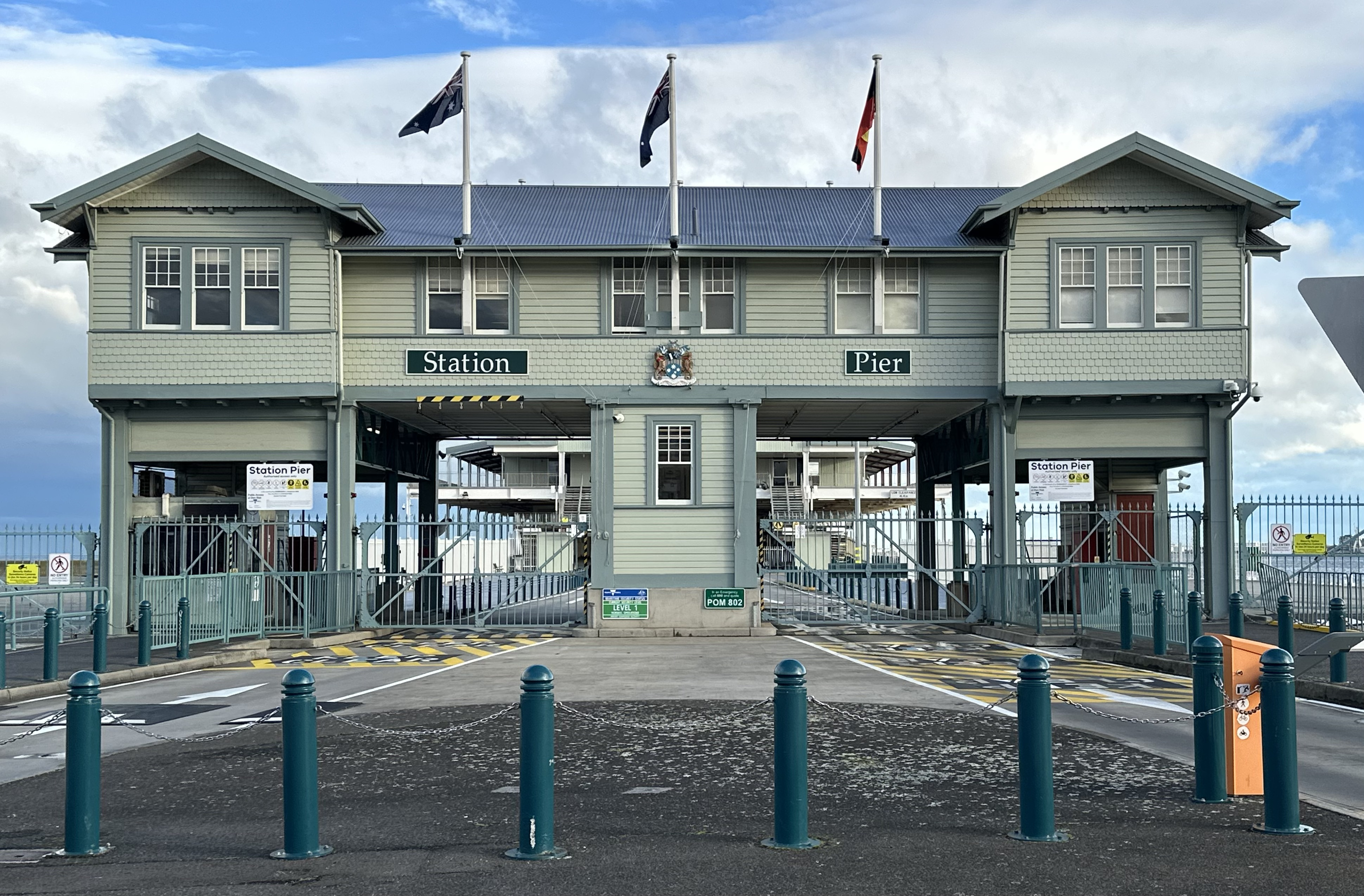
- Station Pier in July 2026
- Location: Port Phillip, Port Melbourne, Victoria
- Coordinates: 37.8444°S 144.9311°E
- Operator: Ports Victoria

History
- Opening date: 12 September 1854

Station Pier is a historic Australian pier on Port Phillip, in Port Melbourne, Victoria. Opened in 1854, the pier is Melbourne's primary passenger terminal, servicing interstate ferries and cruise ships, and is listed on the Victorian Heritage Register.

== History ==
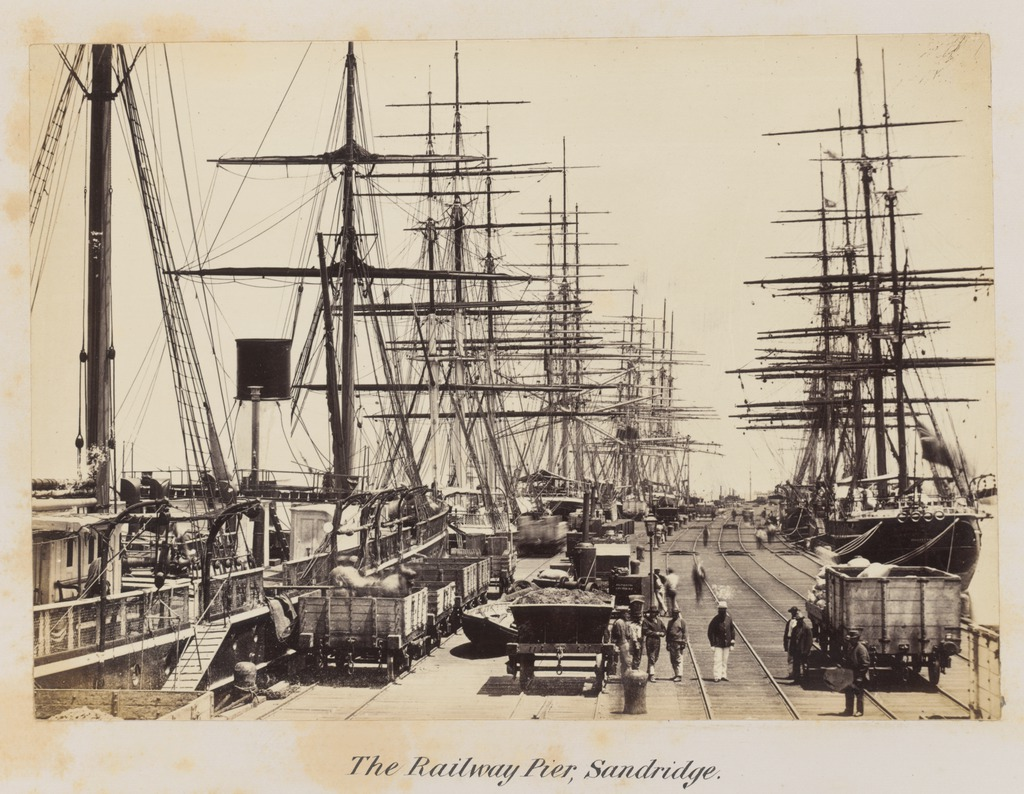
Railway Pier in the late-1800s.

Station Pier, originally known as Railway Pier, was officially opened on 12 September 1854. The 4.5 kilometre Port Melbourne line from the pier to Flinders Street station via the Sandridge Bridge was opened at the same time to facilitate the transport of passengers and goods, and was the first significant railway in Australia. The pier was kept busy throughout the 1850s, due to the increased passenger traffic created by the gold rush. In 1861, the pier was extended to a length of 661 metres, in order to accommodate the ever-increasing traffic associated with the number of people settling in Victoria.

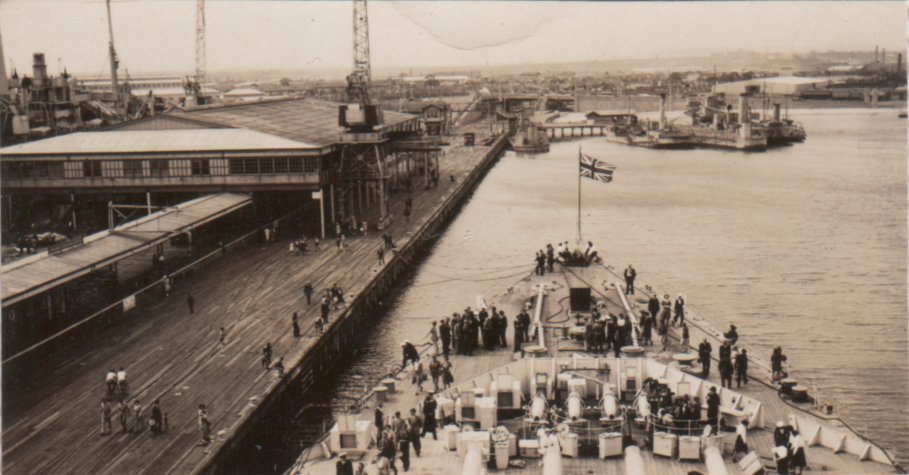
HMS King George V Battleship docked at Station Pier in 1945.

In the early part of the 20th century, the original pier was unable to accommodate the new breed of larger and more powerful steamships. As a result, the current pier was built between 1922 and 1930 and is the largest timber piled wharf structure in Australia. The Stothert and Pitt cranes were erected in 1949 for goods handling. The original supports are still underneath the current pier, chopped down when the replacement was built. The new pier was designed so that passengers landed at the terminals above, while goods traffic moved underneath, in what was quite forward thinking for the 1920s. It has a wharf length of 933 metres, and is capable of berthing ships 305 metres long with a draught of 10.3 metres.

When originally built the pier had five railway sidings running onto it, as well as a passenger platform on the southern side named 'Bay Excursion Platform', a westward extension of Port Melbourne station. After the pier was rebuilt it was provided with eight tracks, four along each wharf face. The outer eastern end of the new pier was 390 feet east of the outer eastern end of the old pier, to make the new pier exactly parallel with the Prince's Pier.

In January 1921 electric passenger services were extended to the platform at the Bay Excursion Pier, two years after electric trains had been extended to Port Melbourne. It was served by two trains per hour Monday to Friday, until their withdrawal in November 1930 as they were not financially rewarding to the Victorian Railways. From 22 May 1933 passenger services were again extended to Station Pier, but only as required when overseas liners were berthed. The overhead wiring had to be extended beyond the Bay Excursion Platform onto the pier itself. The Boat Train service was introduced on 7 March 1936 with a single Tait train set painted in blue livery with silver roof. The name was added to the top of each motor car in red letters along with exterior lighting. Operating direct from Flinders Street station to Station Pier, the service was discontinued in October 1939.

In 1934 the Victorian Centenary Bridge was built over the railway lines, carrying Beach Street traffic over the pier railway sidings, as well as providing road access to the centre of the pier. Overhead wiring over half the pier was removed in October 1937, with the remainder unused from 1939 until removal in January 1950.

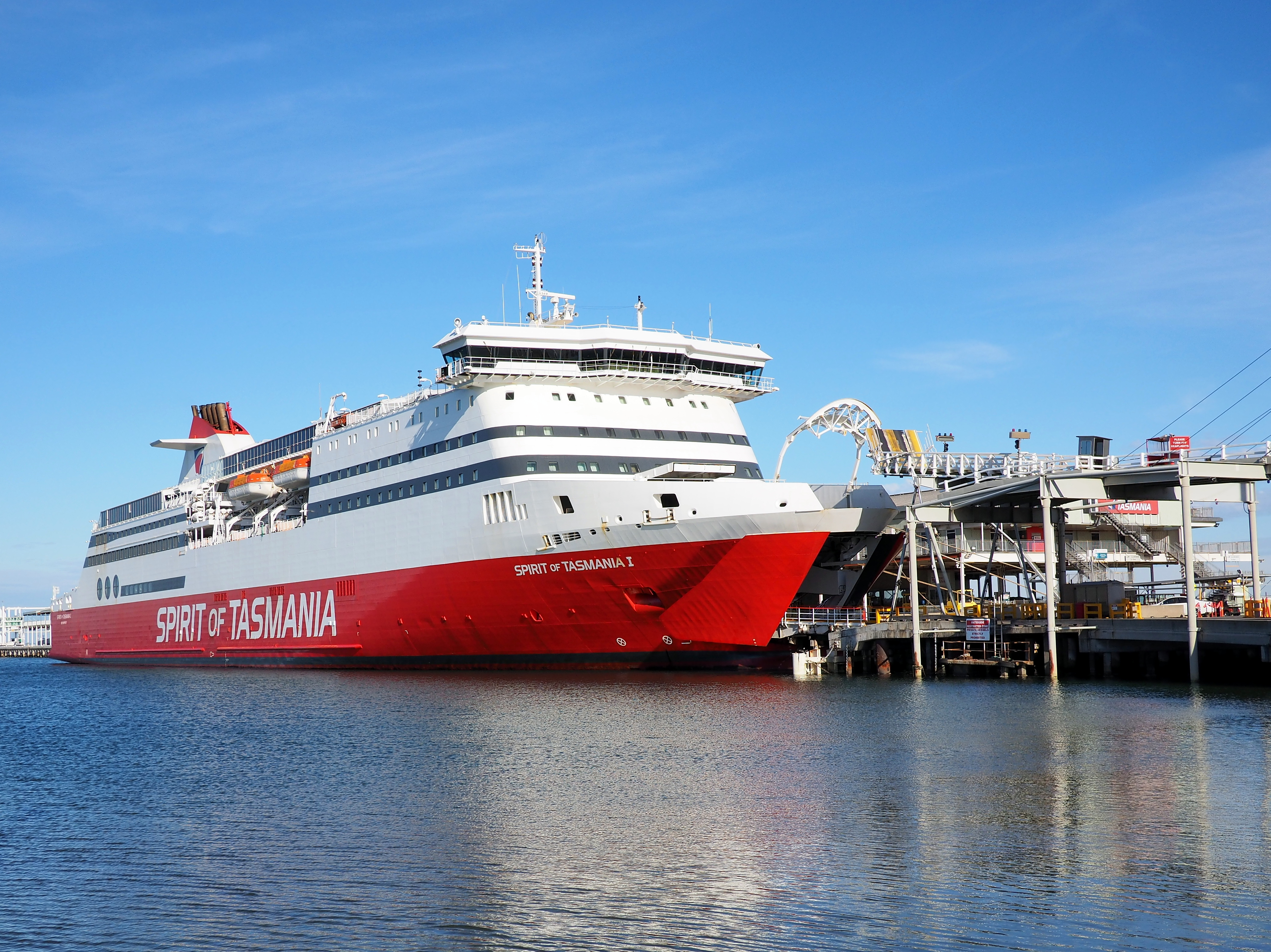
Spirit of Tasmania I loading at Station Pier.

In 1987, the railway line too was closed, and replaced by tram route 109, which runs to Box Hill via the city. The Centenary Bridge was demolished in 1991. The Sandridge Trail runs parallel to the tram line. When refurbished in 1998/99, tram tracks were included in the new concrete decking on the western side for a possible extension of tram route 109.

In 2001, the area at the base of the pier was redeveloped to include a boardwalk and a number of new restaurant and cafe buildings, including 3 Station Pier and Waterfront. At the end of the pier is Rex Hunt's Delish Fish.

== Infrastructure ==
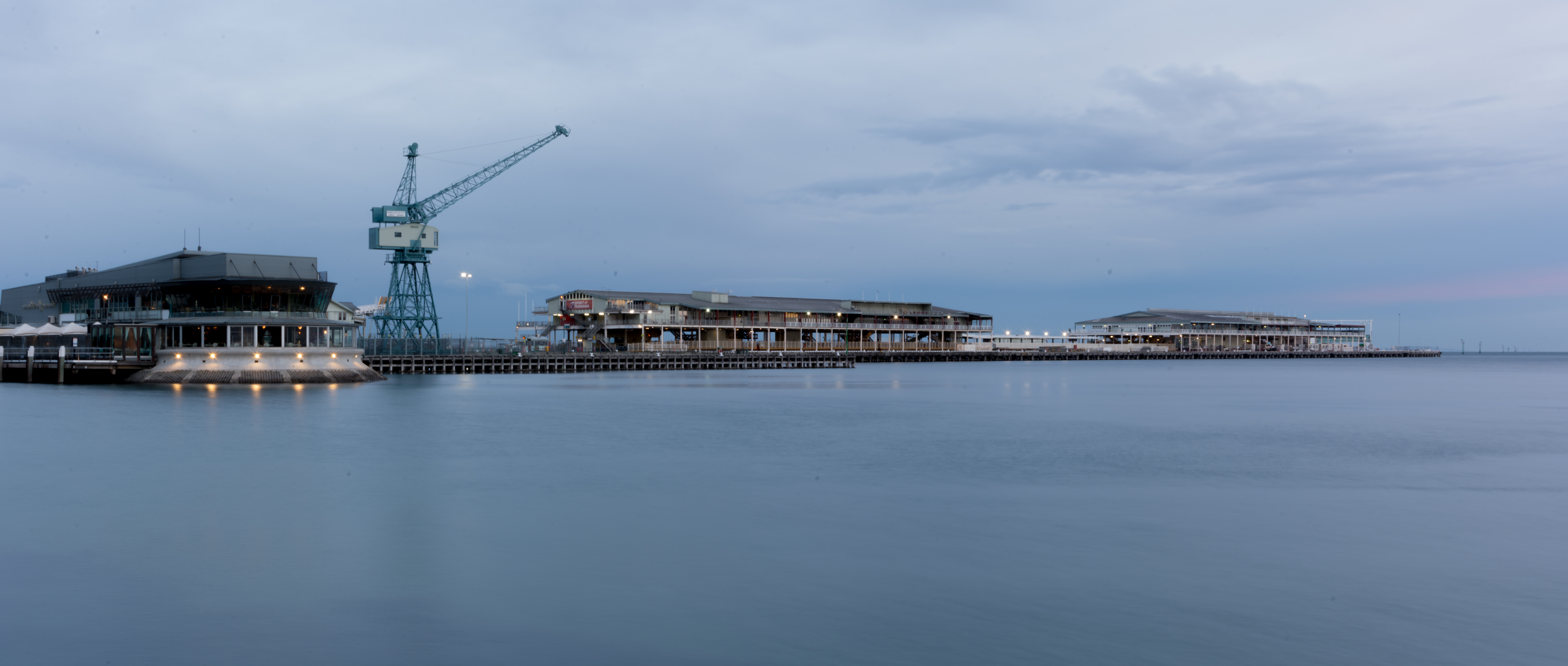
Station Pier in 2016.

Station Pier has four operating berths, two on each side of the wharf. Each berth has a maximum draft of 10.3 metres.

Berth information
Berth	Length (metres)	Usage
Inner East	220	Formerly Tasmania ferry (Spirit of Tasmania) - Now relocated to Geelong.
Outer East	223	cruise-ship berth
Inner West	185	cruise-ship and Royal Australian Navy berth
Outer West	305	cruise-ship berth

The pier operates 24 hours per day, and open for pedestrian access from 6am to 9 pm except when cruise ships or naval ships are visiting. In addition the pier has a central roadway, which allows cars to be driven on to ships capable of carrying them.

Preceding station	Disused railways	Following station
Port Melbourne	Port Melbourne line	Terminus
	List of closed railway stations in Melbourne	
