= MS Spirit of Tasmania I =

Bass Strait ferry

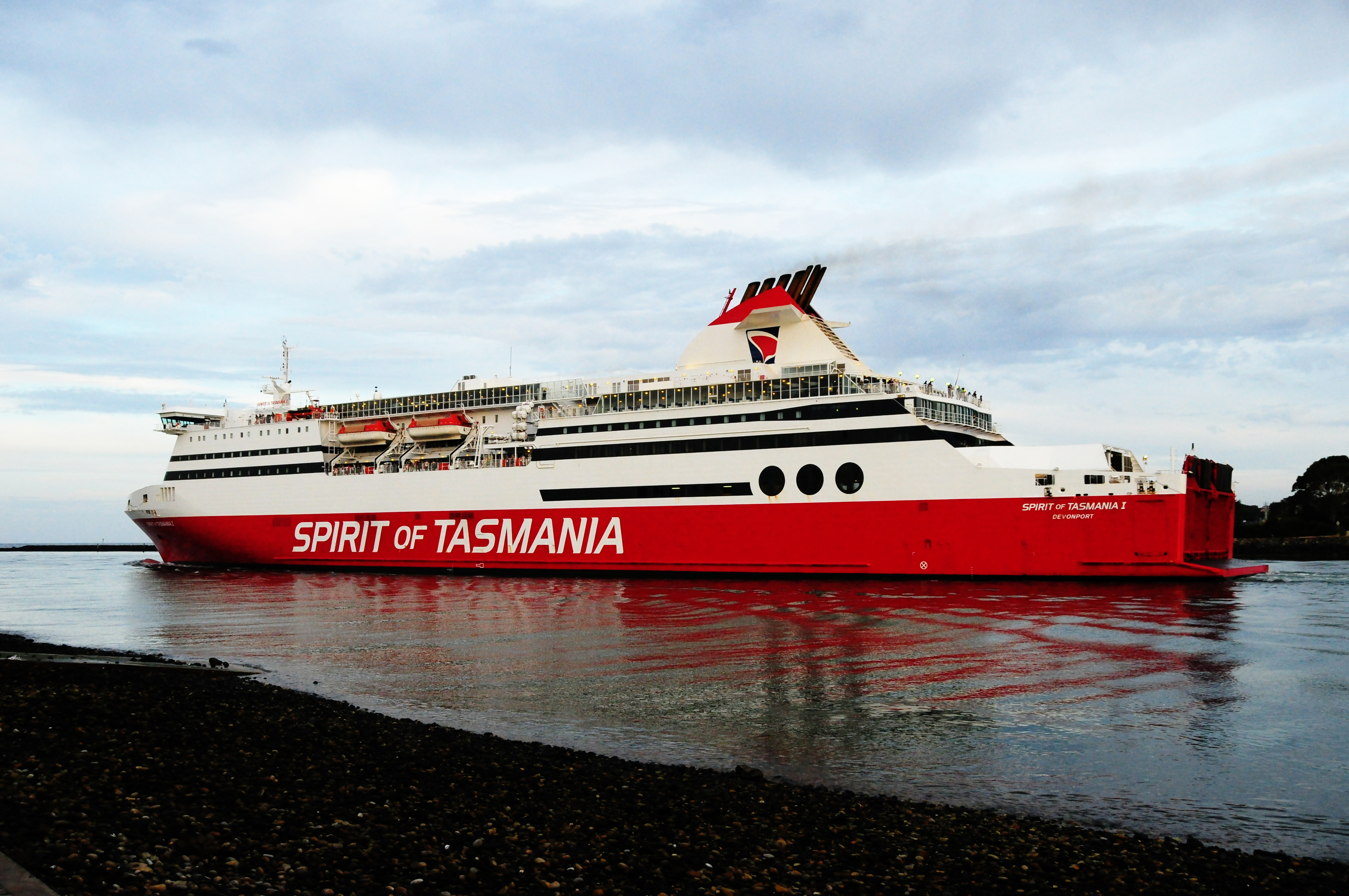
- Spirit of Tasmania I at Devonport, Tasmania

History
- Name: 1998–2002: Superfast IV; 2002–present: Spirit of Tasmania I
- Owner: 1998–2002: Superfast Ferries; 2002 onwards: Spirit of Tasmania
- Operator: 1998–2002: Superfast Ferries; 2003–2006: Spirit of Tasmania
- Port of registry: 1998–2002: Patras, Greece; 2002 onwards: Devonport, Australia
- Route: 1998–2002: Patras–Ancona; 2002-2022: Melbourne–Devonport; 2022-2026: Geelong–Devonport
- Builder: Kvaerner Masa-Yards Turku New Shipyard, Finland
- Yard number: 1341
- Identification: IMO number: 9158446; Call sign: VNGY; MMSI number: 503432000
- Status: In service

General characteristics
- Class & type: Superfast III class fast ropax ferry
- Tonnage: 29,338 GT; 5,651 DWT
- Length: 194.33 m (637 ft 7 in)
- Beam: 25.00 m (82 ft)
- Draught: 6.55 m (21 ft 6 in)
- Decks: 11
- Installed power: 4 × Wärtsilä 16ZA40S diesels; 42,240 kW
- Speed: 30.8 kn (57.04 km/h) maximum speed
- Capacity: 1,400 passengers; 750 berths; 500 cars; 1,464 lanemeters

MS Spirit of Tasmania I is a roll-on/roll-off ferry, most recently operated by Spirit of Tasmania between Geelong and Devonport in Australia. Built in 1998 by Kvaerner Masa-Yards at Turku New Shipyard in Finland for Superfast Ferries as MS Superfast IV, she was sailed for Spirit of Tasmania as the Spirit of Tasmania I between 2002 and 2026.

== Concept and construction ==
The Superfast IV was the second ship of the second pair (the former pair being Superfast I and Superfast II) built for Superfast Ferries at Kvaerner Masa-Yards for its Adriatic Sea services from Patras to Ancona. She was a sister ship of Superfast III.

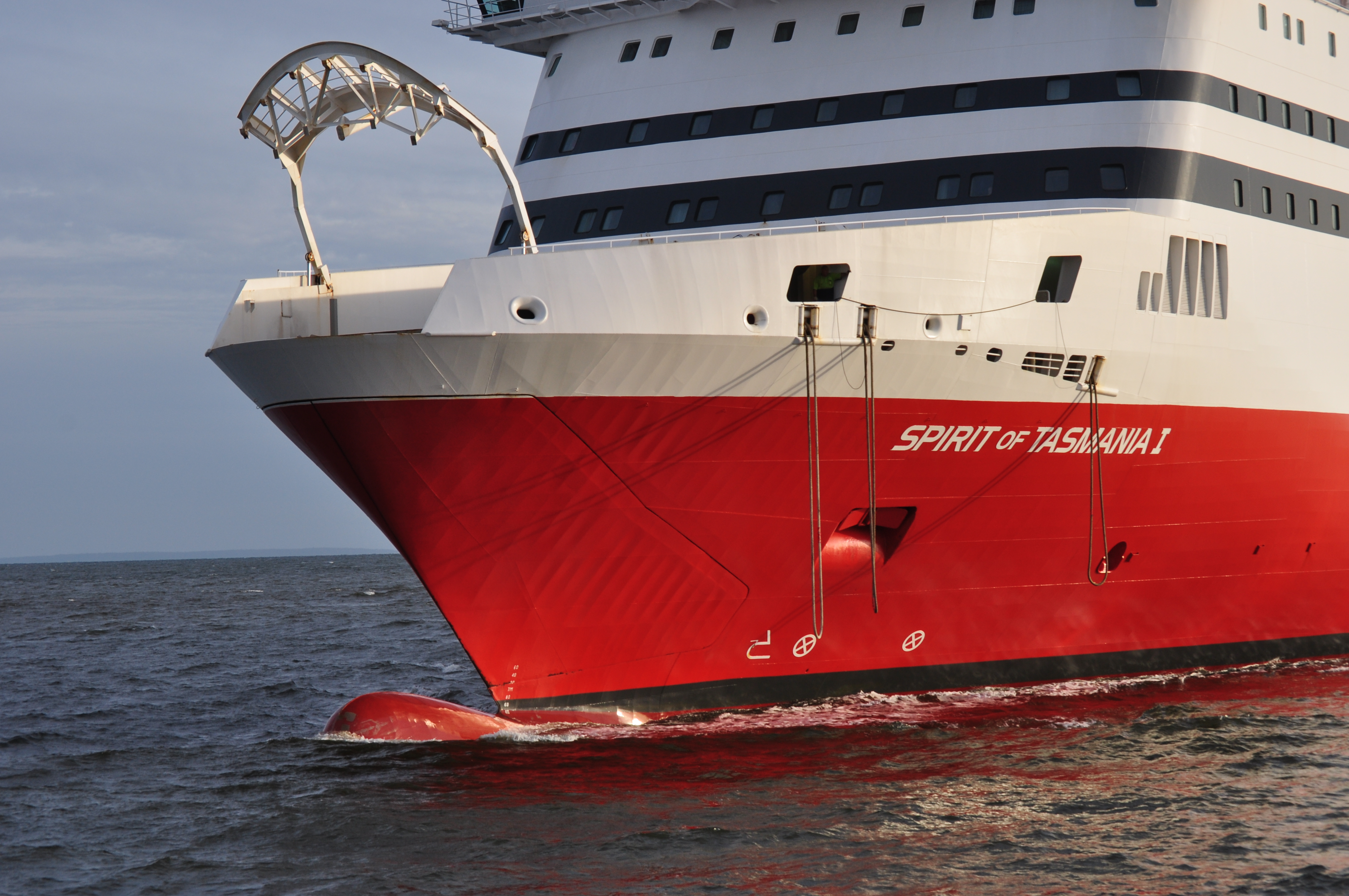
Bulbous bow clearly visible as she comes into Melbourne

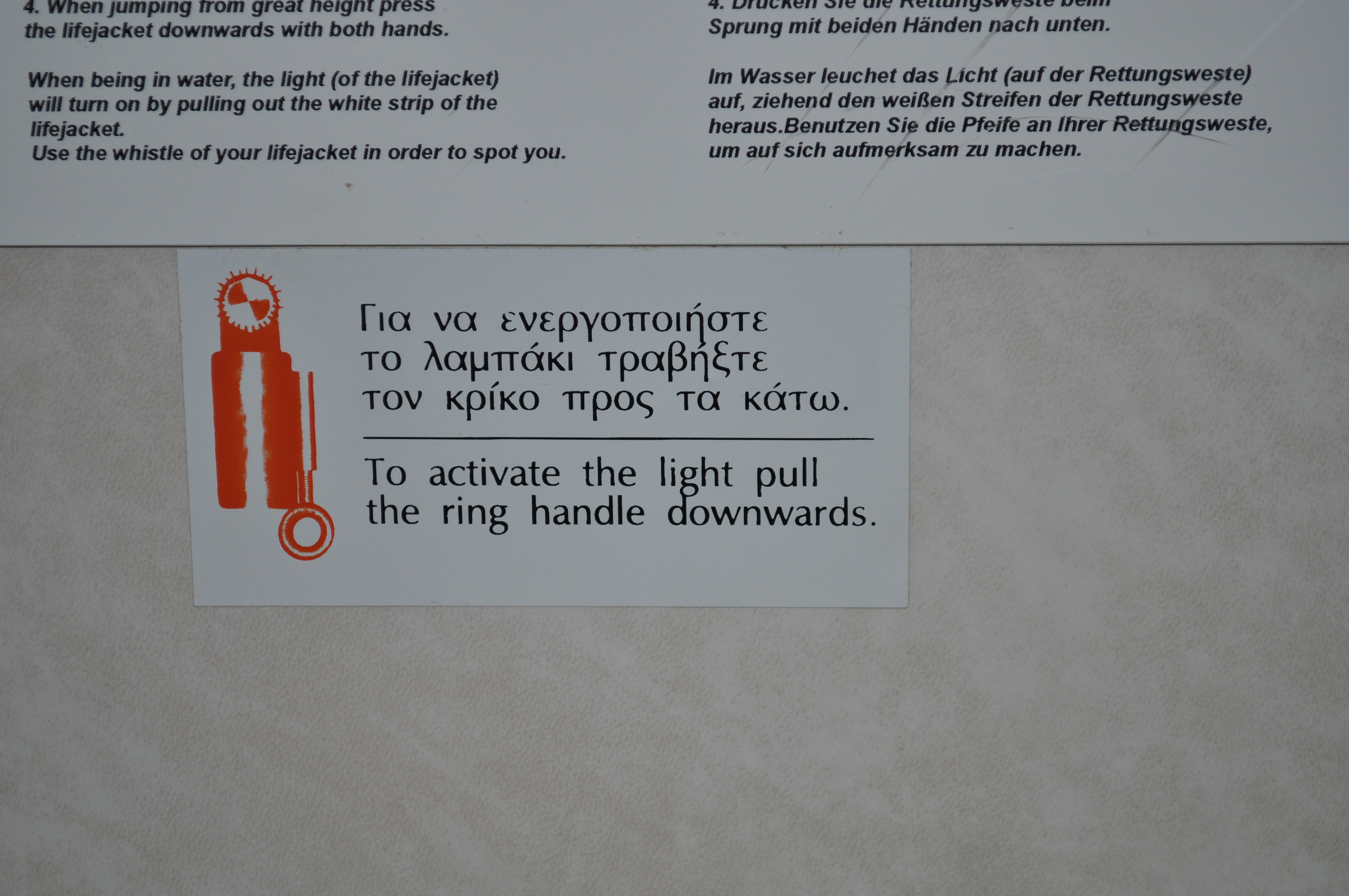
Multi-lingual signage, Greek first

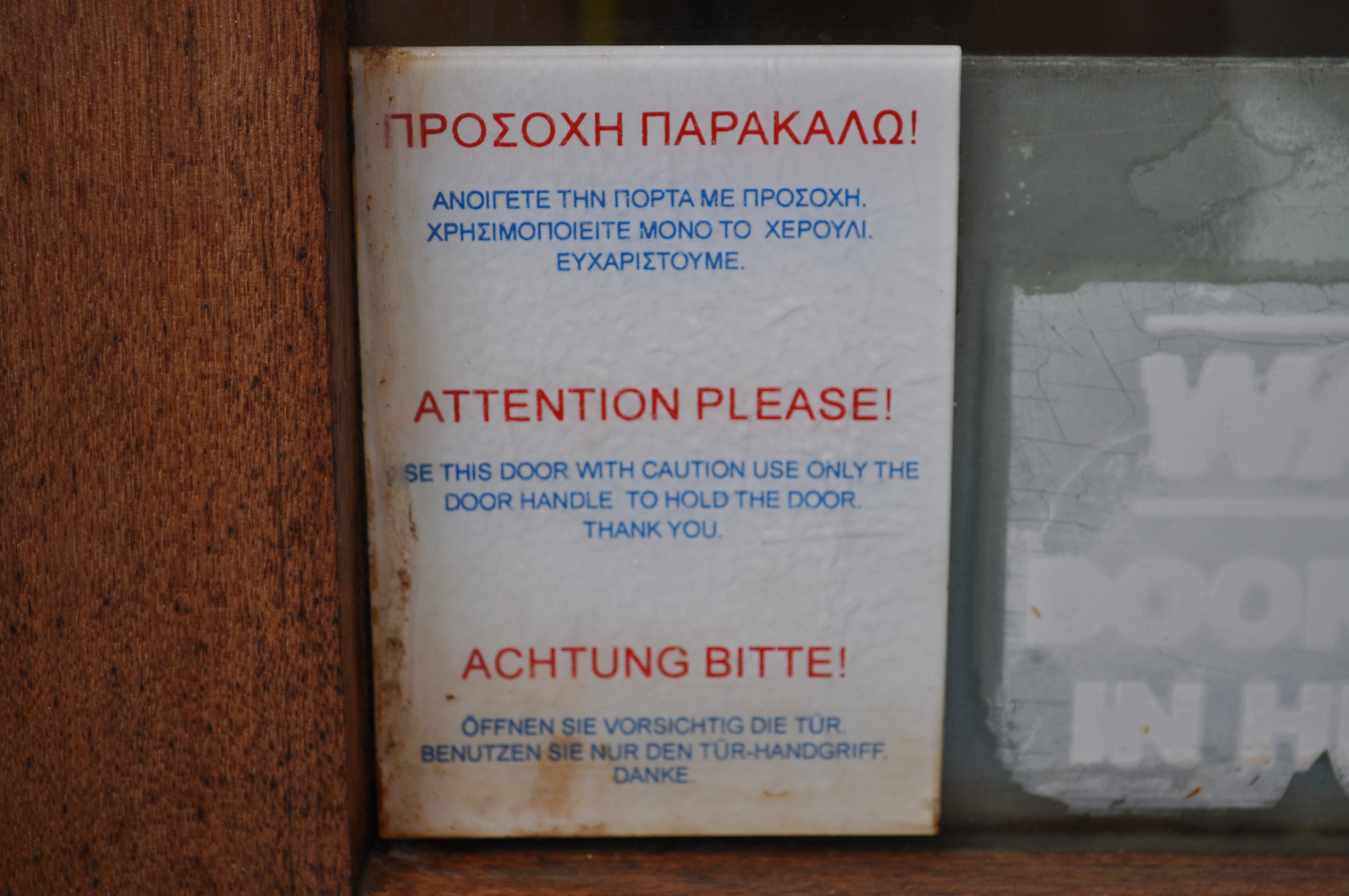
Tri-lingual signage, Greek then English and German

== Amenities and deck layout ==
Spirit of Tasmania I has 11 decks, with 222 cabins.

- Decks 1 to 6 are used to hold cars and trucks. The fore-ends of Decks 1 and 2 are accessed via a ramp from deck 3 (The aft-end space of the two decks houses the ship's machinery). Deck 6 holds cars using a hoistable platform.
- Deck 7 has cabins, a reception area, small movie theater, lounge bar, gaming lounge, gift shop, tourism bureau, main bar, two restaurants and a children's playroom.
- Deck 8 has cabins and an ocean recliner area.
- Deck 9 is mainly crew area.
- Deck 10 has a bar and disco area.
- Deck 11 has a helicopter landing pad.

== Service history ==
=== 1998–2002: Superfast IV ===
The Superfast IV entered service on 1 April 1998 on Superfast Ferries' Patras to Ancona service. In March 2002 the Superfast IV was sold to Spirit of Tasmania.

=== 2002 onwards: Spirit of Tasmania I ===
Spirit of Tasmania took over its new ship at Patras on 10 May 2002. The ship was then sailed to the Neorion ship yard on the island of Syros for painting and general overhaul. She was renamed Spirit of Tasmania I. She subsequently sailed to Hobart, Tasmania, where she was refitted for her new service. On 1 September 2002 she entered service on the Melbourne to Devonport service.

In 2015 she was refurbished in Devonport.

Spirit of Tasmania I and sistership Spirit of Tasmania II were replaced by the Spirit of Tasmania IV and Spirit of Tasmania V in October 2026.

=== 2005 event ===
During the night of 3-4 February 2005 Spirit of Tasmania I ran into heavy seas in the Bass Strait while sailing from Melbourne to Devonport. At approximately 02:00 the seas reached a height of 20 metres. The seas smashed cabin windows on the starboard bow and subsequently cabin walls were smashed down, flooding cabin decks as high as deck 9 (the deck under the bridge). Many passengers were unaware of the cause of water in their cabins since the water had disabled the public announcement system. The captain decided it best to return to Melbourne, arriving mid-morning to heavy media coverage. The ship remained in port overnight for temporary repairs and sailed again the following evening for Devonport.
