= Polar icebreaker =

Polar icebreaker or polar-class icebreaker may refer generally to any icebreaker designed to operate in polar regions and/or designed in accordance with the International Association of Classification Societies (IACS) Unified Requirements for Polar Class Ships, or any of the following specific ships or projects:

- United States Coast Guard
  - USCGC Polar Star and USCGC Polar Sea are jointly referred to as Polar-class icebreakers
  - Polar Security Cutter program was previously referred to as "Heavy Polar Icebreaker program"
- Canadian Coast Guard
  - The Polar 8 Project was one of many cancelled plans to build polar icebreakers for the Canadian Coast Guard
  - Canadian Coast Guard's future polar icebreakers CCGS Arpatuuq and CCGS Imnaryuaq are built under the Polar Icebreaker Project
