= Helsinki Shipyard =

Finnish shipbuilding company

DNY Finland Oy
- Type: Osakeyhtiö
- Industry: Shipbuilding
- Predecessor: Arctech Helsinki Shipyard
- Founded: 15 May 2019 (Helsinki Shipyard Oy); 11 April 2023 (DNY Finland Oy)
- Headquarters: Helsinki, Finland
- Key people: Mika Heiskanen (Managing Director)
- Products: Icebreakers, cruise ships
- Revenue: ▲€115 million (2025); €43 million (2024)
- Operating income: ▲€22 million (2025); €7 million (2024)
- Owner: Algador Holdings (2019–11/2023); Chantier Davie Canada (Inocea Group) (11/2023–)
- Number of employees: 392 (12/2025)
- Website: helsinkishipyard.fi

Helsinki Shipyard (officially DNY Finland Oy) is a Finnish shipbuilding company based at Hietalahti shipyard in Helsinki, Finland owned by Inocea Group.

== History ==
Helsinki Shipyard was established in May 2019 to take over the shipbuilding activities of Arctech Helsinki Shipyard at Hietalahti shipyard in downtown Helsinki. The company had become an economic burden for its Russian owners after the European Union and the United States imposed economic sanctions on the shipyard's Russian state-owned parent company, United Shipbuilding Corporation (USC), as a response to the Russian involvement in the unrest in Ukraine. In early 2018, it was reported that USC was looking for a new majority owner for Arctech Helsinki Shipyard which was making heavy cumulative losses and had been unable to attract new orders since 2016. In April 2019, the Russian government finally authorized the sale of the shipyard.

The sale of the shipbuilding operations in Finland was announced on 15 May 2019. In preparation of the transaction, a new shipbuilding company Helsinki Shipyard Oy was established to take over the assets and operations of Arctech Helsinki Shipyard at Hietalahti Shipyard. It was then sold to Algador Holdings, a private Russian company owned by Rishat Bagautdinov ja Vladimir Kasyanenko, while Arctech remained as a subsidiary of the United Shipbuilding Corporation and would continue shipbuilding operations in Russia as a shareholder of the Saint Petersburg-based Nevsky Shipyard. Victor Olerskiy, the former deputy Russian transport minister and the former head of Federal Agency of Maritime and River Transportation, was appointed as the chairman of the board of the new company.

Following the Russian invasion of Ukraine in February 2022, the shipyard's future became uncertain even though neither the Finnish company itself nor its Russian owners were targeted by the new international sanctions against Russia. According to the Mayor of Helsinki, Juhana Vartiainen, the city would have to re-evaluate the long-term land-lease agreement for the Hietalahti shipyard, located in central Helsinki, due to the changed geopolitical situation.

In March 2023, Helsinki Shipyard announced that the Quebec-based shipbuilder Chantier Davie Canada (Davie Shipbuilding), part of the Inocea Group, had exercised an exclusive option for the potential purchase the Finnish shipyard's assets. The negotiations had reportedly begun already in December 2022. The conditional business purchase agreement, subject to approval of the authorities and fulfillment of the terms of the agreement, was signed in April 2023. In June 2023, the City of Helsinki agreed to extend the land lease agreement for the shipyard site by 50 years until 2073. The acquisition was completed on 3 November 2023. Following the change in ownership, the shipyard has continued using Helsinki Shipyard as the brand name while the legal name of the new company is DNY Finland Oy.

== Orders ==
Shortly after the change of ownership, the new owners hinted that the first shipbuilding order for the new company would be announced within a month from its founding. In late May 2019, Hufvudstadsbladet reported that the shipyard had signed a letter of intent for the construction of two 150-to-160-passenger Polar Class 5 expedition cruise ships to an undisclosed buyer. On 27 June, the shipyard confirmed an order for two 113-metre (371 ft) expedition cruise ships with capacity of 157 passengers under the name "Project Vega". While Kommersant initially reported that the ships would be built for Vodohod, a Russian shipping company owned by the same people who acquired the Helsinki shipyard, in 2020 it was revealed that the vessels would be operated by the revived British cruise line Swan Hellenic. Steel block production began at Western Baltija Shipbuilding in Klaipėda, Lithuania, on 27 April 2020 and hull assembly of the first vessel, SH Minerva, began with keel laying in Helsinki on 24 September 2020. This was followed by launching on 23 June 2021 and delivery of the vessel in late November of the same year. The keel of the second vessel, SH Vega, was laid on 4 February 2021 and the vessel was floated out in February 2022. The vessel was delivered in July 2022 following a naming ceremony at the shipyard.

On 20 October 2020, Finnish media reported that Helsinki Shipyard was about to sign a shipbuilding contract for a third expedition cruise ship for Swan Hellenic. On the following day, the shipyard confirmed a 150 million euro order for a Polar Class 6 luxury cruise ship with a capacity of 196 passengers in 96 cabins. The production of the ship began with steel cutting at CRIST in Poland on 10 June 2021 and the keel was laid in Helsinki on 8 April 2022. The 125-metre (410 ft) SH Diana, slightly larger than its two predecessors, was floated out from the shipyard's covered dry dock in January 2023 and, after completing sea trials, was delivered on 31 March.

On 18 January 2022, Helsinki Shipyard announced that it had received an order for a large LNG-powered icebreaker from Norilsk Nickel in late 2021. The construction of the largest and most powerful diesel-electric icebreaker ever built in Finland was planned to begin in 2022 with delivery slated for late 2024. In February 2022, the project was put on hold due to international sanctions following Russian invasion of Ukraine. On 30 September 2022, the Ministry for Foreign Affairs refused to grant an export license for the vessel.

On 8 March 2025, Helsinki Shipyard received its first shipbuilding order under the new ownership when the Government of Canada awarded Davie Shipbuilding a C$3.25 billion contract for the construction of a polar icebreaker for the Canadian Coast Guard under the Polar Icebreaker Project. The construction of the 138.5-metre (454 ft 5 in) Polar Class 2 icebreaker began with a steel cutting ceremony on 20 August 2025. The vessel will be built jointly by Helsinki Shipyard in Finland and Davie Shipbuilding in Quebec with delivery scheduled for 2030.

On 9 October 2025, President Donald Trump and President Alexander Stubb signed a memorandum of understanding for the construction of Arctic Security Cutters for the United States Coast Guard. Under the agreement, the first icebreakers would be built in Finland and the remaining in the United States. On 11 February 2026, Davie was awarded a contract for the construction of a series of five icebreakers: two will be built at Helsinki Shipyard and three at Davie's recently-acquired shipyards in Galveston and Port Arthur, Texas. The construction of the first vessel began with a steel cutting ceremony in Pori on 23 June 2026.

On 19 August 2026, the Finnish Transport Infrastructure Agency selected Helsinki Shipyard to build Finland's new icebreaker. The construction of the vessel is set to begin in 2027 and delivery is scheduled in 2029.

== List of ships ==
Ship name	Year	Type	Yard number	IMO number	Status	Notes	Image	Ref
SH Minerva	2021	Cruise ship	516	9895240	In service			
SH Vega	2022	Cruise ship	517	9895252	In service	Sister ship to SH Minerva		
SH Diana	2023	Cruise ship	518	9921740	In service			
	2024 (planned)	Icebreaker	519	9957804	Cancelled	Cancelled due to international sanctions following 2022 Russian invasion of Ukraine		
Arpatuuq	2030 (planned)	Icebreaker	520	1118725	Under construction	Built jointly with Davie Shipbuilding in Lévis, Quebec.		
	2028 (planned)	Icebreaker		4777285	Under construction			
	2029 (planned)	Icebreaker		4777297	Ordered			
