= Polar Class =

Ice class

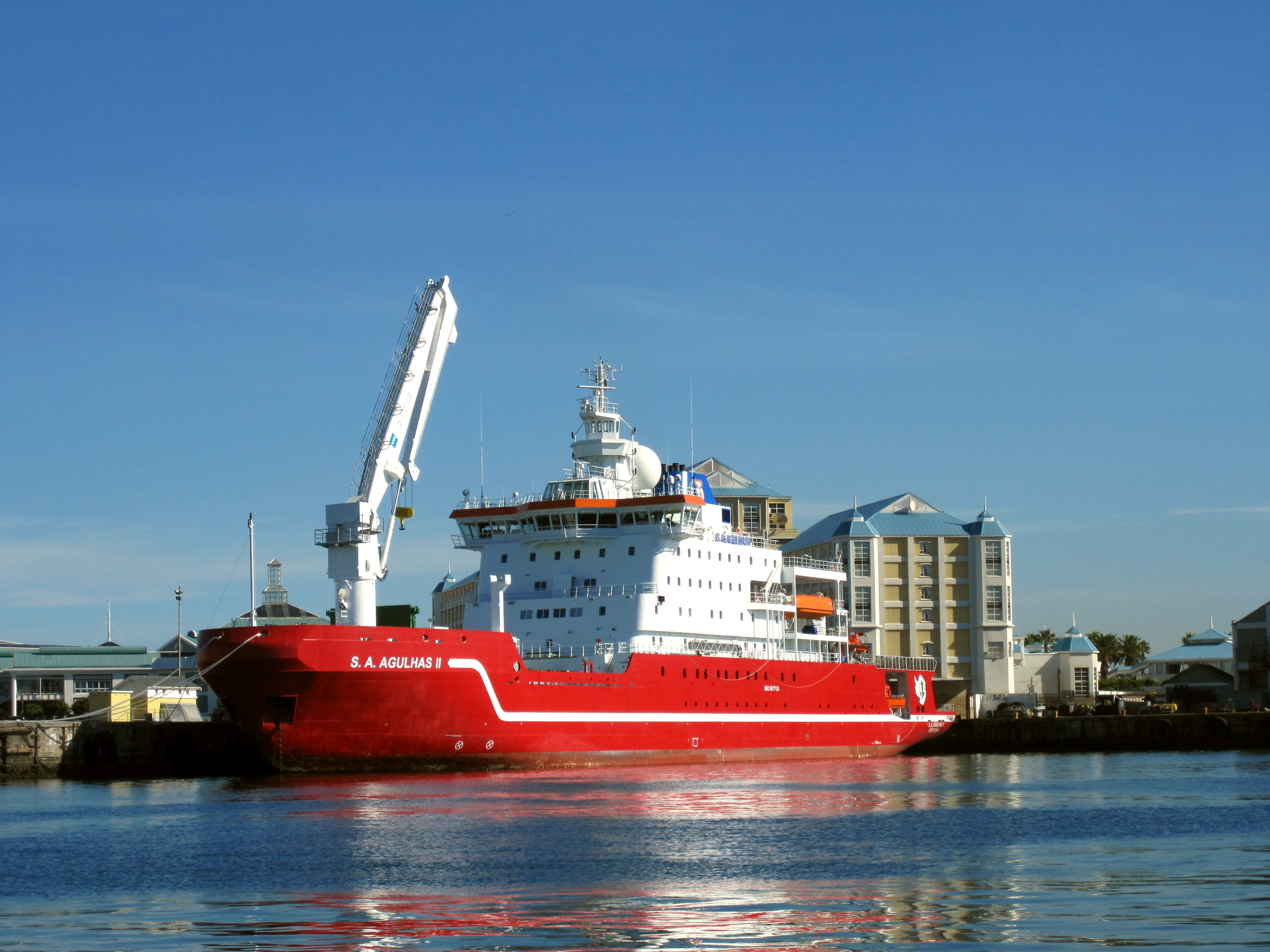
The 2012-built South African polar research vessel S. A. Agulhas II is one of the few vessels rated PC 5 or higher.

Polar Class (PC) refers to the ice class assigned to a ship by a classification society based on the Unified Requirements for Polar Class Ships developed by the International Association of Classification Societies (IACS). Seven Polar Classes are defined in the rules, ranging from PC 1 for year-round operation in all polar waters to PC 7 for summer and autumn operation in thin first-year ice.

The IACS Polar Class rules should not be confused with International Code for Ships Operating in Polar Waters (Polar Code) by the International Maritime Organization (IMO).

== Background ==
The development of the Polar Class rules began in the 1990s with an international effort to harmonize the requirements for marine operations in the polar waters in order to protect life, property and the environment. The guidelines developed by the International Maritime Organization (IMO), which were later incorporated in the Polar Code, made reference to the compliance with Unified Requirements for Polar Ships developed by the International Association of Classification Societies (IACS). In May 1996, an "Ad-Hoc Group to establish Unified Requirements for Polar Ships (AHG/PSR)" was established with one working group concentrating on the structural requirements and another working on machinery-related issues. The first IACS Polar Class rules were published in 2007.

Prior to the development of the unified requirements, each classification society had their own set of ice class rules ranging from Baltic ice classes intended for operation in first-year ice to higher vessel categories, including icebreakers, intended for operations in polar waters. When developing the upper and lower boundaries for the Polar Classes, it was agreed that the highest Polar Class vessels (PC 1) should be capable of operating safely anywhere in the Arctic or the Antarctic waters at any time of the year while the lower boundary was set to existing tonnage operating during the summer season, most of which followed the Baltic ice classes with some upgrades and additions. The lowest Polar Class (PC 7) was thus set to the similar level with the Finnish-Swedish ice class 1A. The definition of operational conditions for each Polar Class was intentionally left vague due to the wide variety of ship operations carried out in polar waters.

== Definition ==
=== Polar Class notations ===
The IACS has established seven different Polar Class notations, ranging from PC 1 (highest) to PC 7 (lowest), with each level corresponding to operational capability and strength of the vessel. The description of ice conditions where ships of each Polar Class are intended to operate are based on World Meteorological Organization (WMO) Sea Ice Nomenclature. These definitions are intended to guide owners, designers and administrations in selecting the appropriate Polar Class to match the intended voyage or service of the vessel. Ships with sufficient power and strength to undertake "aggressive operations in ice-covered waters", such as escort and ice management operations, can be assigned an additional notation "Icebreaker".

The two lowest Polar Classes (PC 6 and PC 7) are roughly equivalent to the two highest Finnish-Swedish ice classes (1A Super and 1A, respectively). However, unlike the Baltic ice classes intended for operation only in first-year sea ice, even the lowest Polar Classes consider the possibility of encountering multi-year ice ("old ice inclusions").

Polar Class	Ice descriptions in Polar Class rules	Corresponding ice thickness in the WMO Sea Ice Nomenclature
PC 1	Year-round operation in all polar waters	Not defined
PC 2	Year-round operation in moderate multi-year ice conditions	Up to 3.0 m (9.8 ft) or more
PC 3	Year-round operation in second-year ice which may include multi-year ice inclusions	Up to 2.5 m (8.2 ft) and sometimes more
PC 4	Year-round operation in thick first-year ice which may include old ice inclusions	Over 120 cm (3.9 ft)
PC 5	Year-round operation in medium first-year ice which may include old ice inclusions	70 to 120 cm (2.3 to 3.9 ft)
PC 6	Summer/autumn operation in medium first-year ice which may include old ice inclusions	70 to 120 cm (2.3 to 3.9 ft)
PC 7	Summer/autumn operation in thin first-year ice which may include old ice inclusions	30 to 70 cm (0.98 to 2.30 ft)

=== Requirements ===
In the Polar Class rules, the hull of the vessel is divided longitudinally into four regions: "bow", "bow intermediate", "midbody" and "stern". All longitudinal regions except the bow are further divided vertically into "bottom", "lower" and "icebelt" regions. For each region, a design ice load is calculated based on the dimensions, hull geometry, and ice class of the vessel. This ice load is then used to determine the scantlings and steel grades of structural elements such as shell plating and frames in each location. The design scenario used to determine the ice loads is a glancing collision with a floating ice floe.

In addition to structural details, the Polar Class rules have requirements for machinery systems such as the main propulsion, steering gear, and systems essential for the safety of the crew and survivability of the vessel. For example, propeller-ice interaction should be taken into account in the propeller design, cooling systems and sea water inlets should be designed to work also in ice-covered waters, and the ballast tanks should be provided with effective means of preventing freezing.

Although the rules generally require the ships to have suitable hull form and sufficient propulsion power to operate independently and at continuous speed in ice conditions corresponding to their Polar Class, the ice-going capability requirements of the vessel are not clearly defined in terms of speed or ice thickness. In practice, this means that the Polar Class of the vessel may not reflect the actual icebreaking capability of the vessel.

== Polar Class ships ==
The IACS Polar Class rules apply for ships contracted for construction on or after 1 July 2007. This means that while vessels built prior to this date may have an equivalent or even higher level of ice strengthening, they are not officially assigned a Polar Class and may not in fact fulfill all the requirements in the unified requirements. In addition, Russian ships and icebreakers are assigned ice classes only according to the requirements of the Russian Maritime Register of Shipping, which maintains its own ice class rules parallel to the IACS Polar Class rules.

Although numerous ships have been built to the two least hardened Polar Classes, PC 6 and PC 7, only a small number of ships have been assigned ice class PC 5 or higher.

=== Polar Class 5 ===
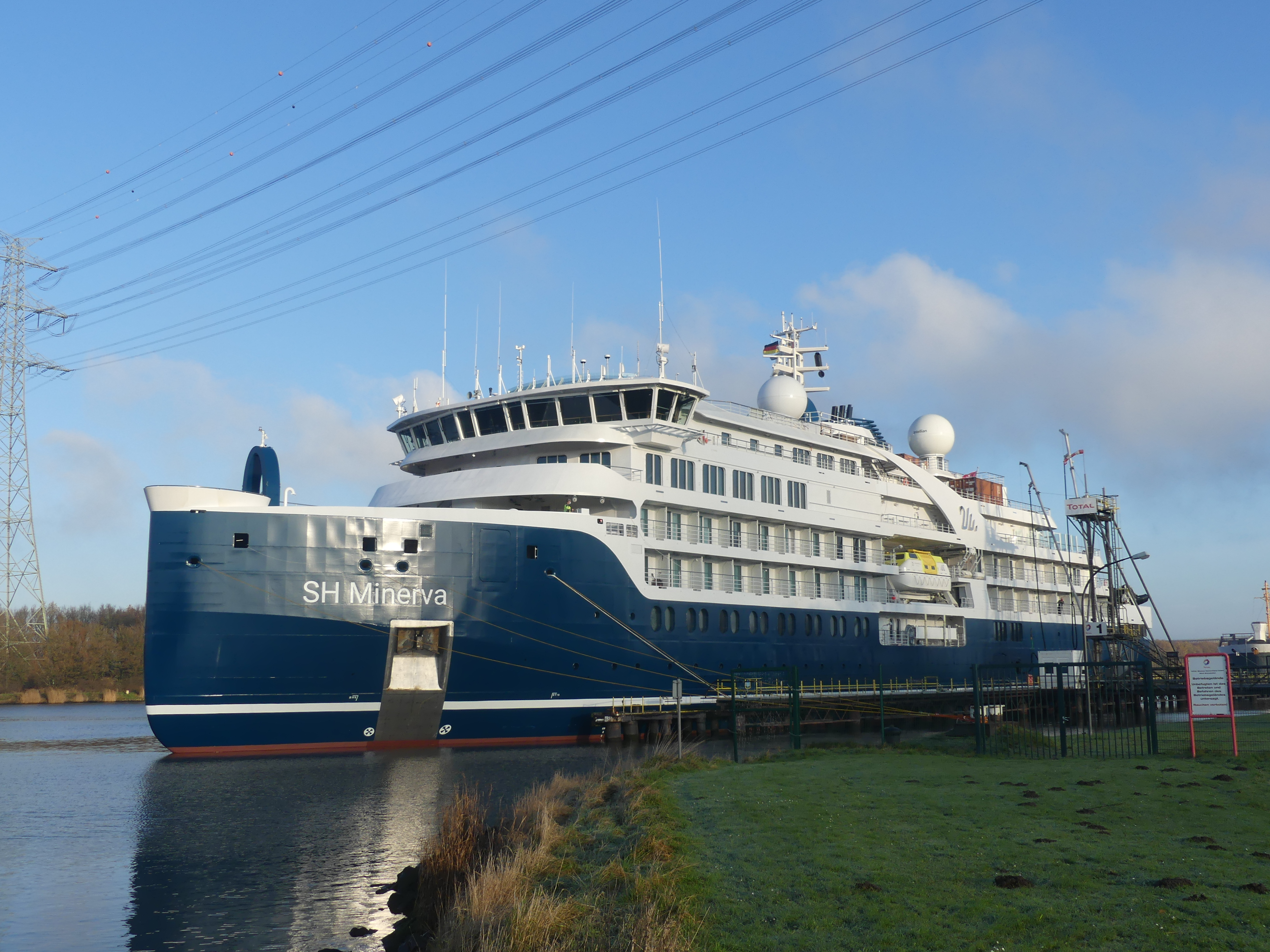
The 2020-built SH Minerva is a small expedition cruise ship with Polar Class 5 rating.

A number of research vessels intended for scientific missions in the polar regions are built to PC 5 rating: the South African S. A. Agulhas II in 2012, the American Sikuliaq in 2014,, the British RRS Sir David Attenborough in 2020, (Note: Hull strengthened to PC 4.) and the Chilean Almirante Viel in 2024.

In 2012, the Royal Canadian Navy awarded a shipbuilding contract for the construction of six Arctic Offshore Patrol Ships (AOPS) built to PC 5 rating. (Note: Bow strengthened to PC 4.) As of 2026, five of the six vessels (Harry DeWolf, Margaret Brooke, Max Bernays, William Hall, and Frédérick Rolette) have entered service, with the Robert Hampton Gray delivered and expected to enter service later in 2026. Two additional ships, CCGS Donjek and CCGS Sermilik, are under construction for the Canadian Coast Guard.

As of 2025, four cruise ships have been built with PC 5 rating: National Geographic Endurance (delivered in 2020) and National Geographic Resolution (2021) for Lindblad Expeditions, and SH Minerva (2021) and SH Vega (2022) for Swan Hellenic.

=== Polar Class 4 ===
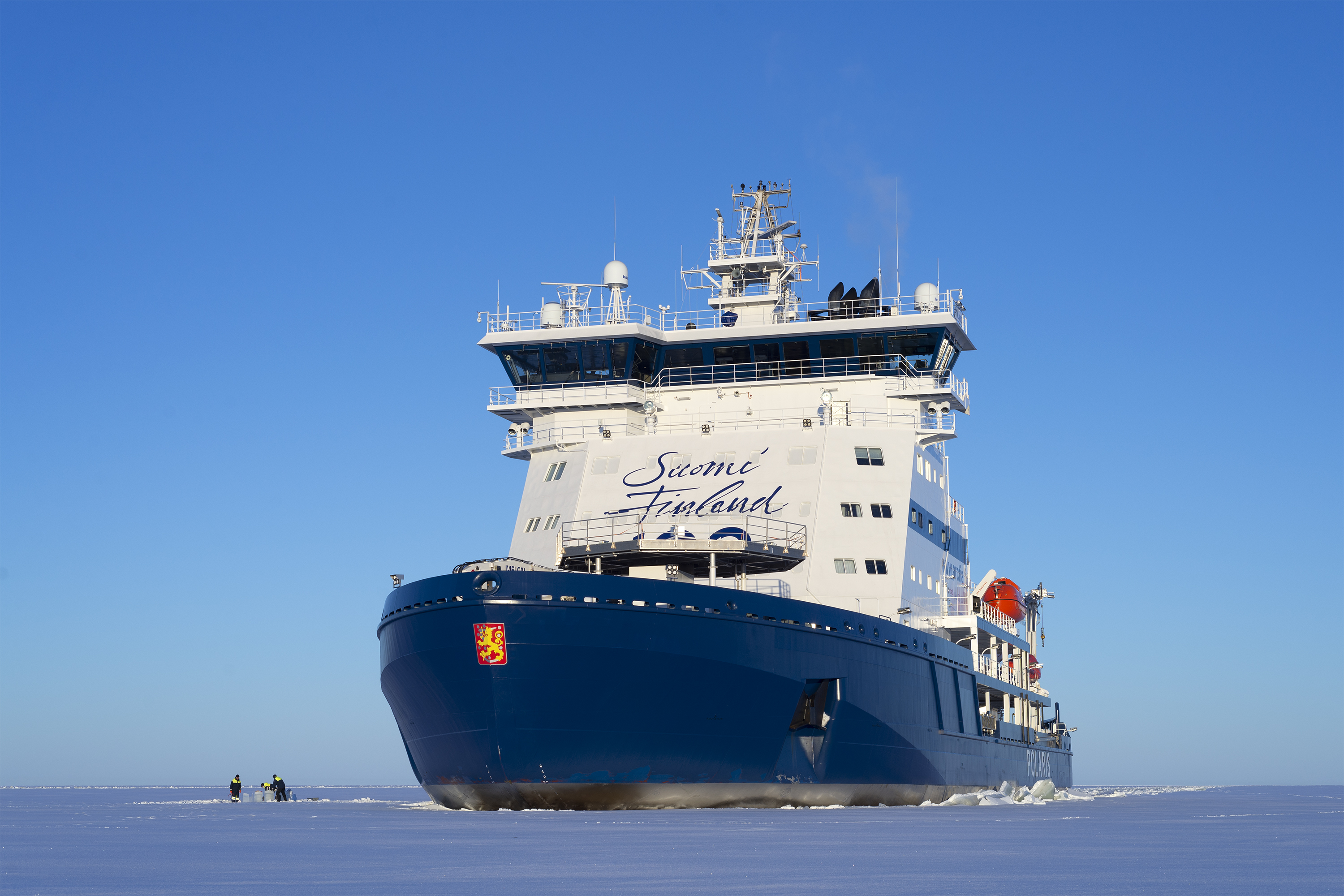
The Finnish LNG-powered icebreaker Polaris, built in 2016, is rated Polar Class 4 with an additional notation "Icebreaker(+)" denoting additional strengthening.

The 2012-built drillship Stena IceMAX has a hull strengthened according to PC 4 requirements. (Note: Propulsion units strengthened to Det Norske Veritas ICE-10 rating.) However, the 228 metres (748 ft 0 in) long and 42 metres (137 ft 10 in) wide vessel does not feature an icebreaking hull and is designed to operate primarily in pre-broken ("managed") ice.

The Canadian shipping company Fednav operates two PC 4 rated bulk carriers, 2014-built Nunavik and 2021-built Arvik I. The 28,000-tonne vessels are primarily used to transport nickel ore from Raglan Mine in the Canadian Arctic.

In 2015, the hull of the Finnish 1986-built icebreaker Otso was reinforced with additional steel to PC 4 level to allow the vessel to support seismic surveys in the Arctic during the summer months.

The Finnish LNG-powered icebreaker Polaris, built in 2016, is rated PC 4 with an additional Lloyd's Register class notation "Icebreaker(+)". The latter part of the notation refers to additional structural strengthening based on analysis of the vessel's operational profile and potential ice loading scenarios.

The interim icebreakers CCGS Captain Molly Kool, CCGS Jean Goodwill, and CCGS Vincent Massey, built in 2000–01 and acquired by the Canadian Coast Guard 2018, were upgraded to PC 4 rating as part of the vessels' conversion to Canadian service.

In December 2024, the Institute of Deep-sea Science and Engineering of the Chinese Academy of Sciences took delivery of the PC 4 rated icebreaking research vessel.

The Japan Agency for Marine-Earth Science and Technology (JAMSTEC) is building a new PC 4 rated icebreaker Mirai II for researching the Arctic region. The vessel is expected to enter service in 2027.

The Swedish Maritime Administration has ordered a new icebreaker rated PC 4 Icebreaker(+). The vessel is expected to enter service in 2029.

The new Canadian Coast Guard Multi-Purpose Icebreaker (MPI) will be rated PC 4 Icebreaker(+). Sixteen vessels will be built by Seaspan in the 2020s and 2030s. In addition, the first series of six Arctic Security Cutters (ASC) for the United States Coast Guard built by Rauma Marine Constructions in Finland and Bollinger Shipyards in the United States will be based on the Canadian MPI design with PC 4 rating with the first vessel scheduled for delivery in 2028.

=== Polar Class 3 ===
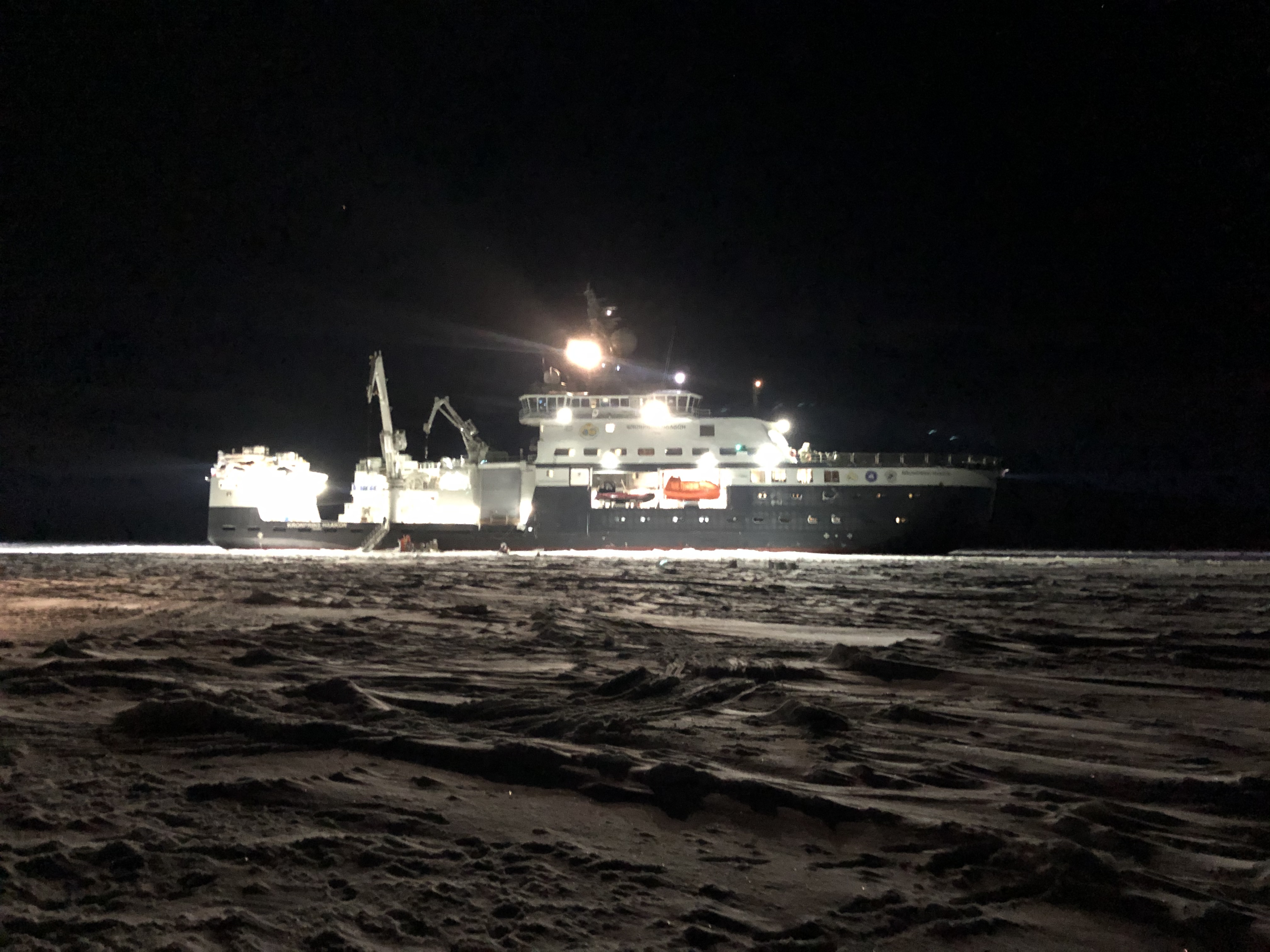
The Polar Class 3 icebreaking research vessel Kronprins Haakon is operated by the Norwegian Polar Institute.

The first PC 3 vessels were two heavy load carriers, Audax and Pugnax, built for the Netherlands-based ZPMC-Red Box Energy Services in 2016. The vessels built for year-round transportation of LNG liquefaction plant modules to Sabetta.

Although usually referred to by their Russian Maritime Register of Shipping ice class Arc7, the fifteen first-generation Yamalmax LNG carriers built in 2016–2019 as well as the arctic condensate tankers Boris Sokolov (built in 2018), Yuriy Kuchiev (2019) and Anatoly Lamekhov (2024) also have PC 3 rating from Bureau Veritas.

In April 2015, it was reported that Edison Chouest would build two PC 3 anchor handling tug supply vessels (AHTS) for Alaskan operations. However, the construction of the vessels due for delivery by the end of 2016 was later cancelled following Shell Oil's decision to halt Arctic oil exploration.

As of 2025, three polar research vessels have been built with PC 3 rating: Kronprins Haakon for the Norwegian Polar Institute in 2018, Xue Long 2 for the Polar Research Institute of China in 2019, and Nuyina for the Australian Antarctic Division in 2021. Kronprins Haakon also has the additional notation "Icebreaker" while Nuyina' notation includes Lloyd's Register's "Icebreaker(+)" notation. The new South Korean polar research vessel will also be built to PC 3 rating.

The Finnish multipurpose icebreakers Fennica and Nordica, built in the early 1990s, were assigned PC 3 rating as part of the vessels' Polar Code certification in 2019.

The second series of five Arctic Security Cutters (ASC) for the United States Coast Guard, built in Finland and the United States, will be rated PC 3.

=== Polar Class 2 ===
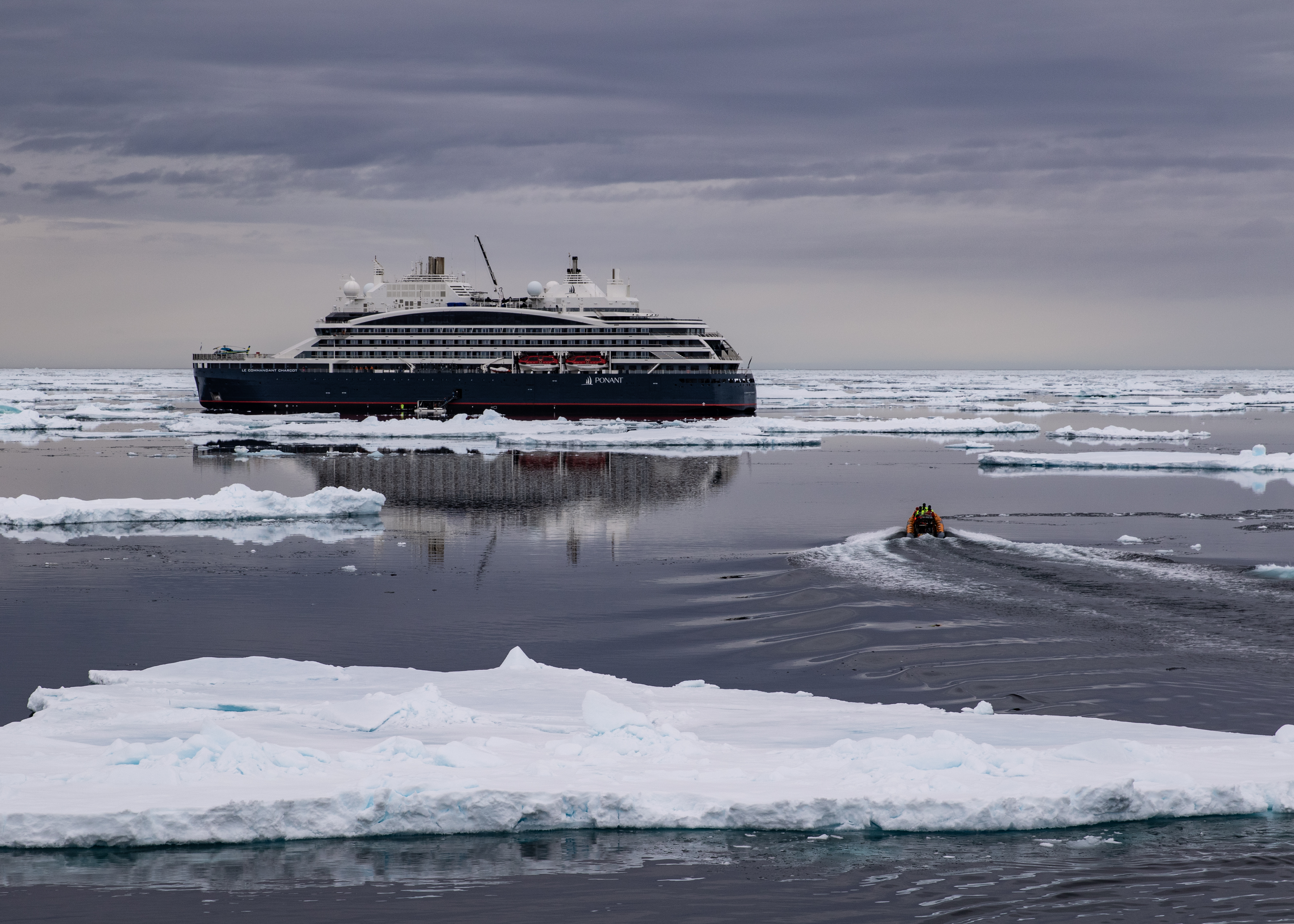
Le Commandant Charcot is the only Polar Class 2 ship in service as of 2025.

As of 2025, the only PC 2 rated vessel in service is the expedition cruise ship Le Commandant Charcot operated by the French company Compagnie du Ponant. The 270-passenger vessel, capable of breaking up to 2.5 metres (8 ft) thick multi-year ice and taking passengers to the North Pole, was delivered in 2021.

The United States Coast Guard has ordered two out of three planned PC 2 rated heavy polar icebreakers referred to as Polar Security Cutters. The first contract was awarded in April 2019 and the second in December 2021. Construction of the first vessel, USCGC Polar Sentinel, has been delayed by several years and now is not expected to be delivered to the U.S. Coast Guard until at least 2030. While the vessels these Polar Security Cutters are intended to replace, USCGC Polar Star and USCGC Polar Sea, are sometimes referred to as Polar-class icebreakers, these mid-1970s icebreakers are not built in accordance with the IACS rules and do not carry a PC rating.

In December 2024, the German research institute Alfred Wegener Institute contracted ThyssenKrupp Marine Systems to build a replacement for the 1982-built research icebreaker Polarstern. The new vessel, scheduled for delivery in 2030, will be rated PC 2.

In March 2025, the Government of Canada awarded construction contracts for two PC 2 rated polar icebreakers for the Canadian Coast Guard under the National Shipbuilding Strategy Polar Icebreaker Project. The first vessel will be built by Seaspan Vancouver Shipyards and the second, slightly smaller, by Davie Shipbuilding in co-operation with the Finnish Helsinki Shipyard. The vessels, named CCGS Arpatuuq and CCGS Imnaryuaq, are expected to enter service in the early 2030s.

=== Polar Class 1 ===
As of 2025, no ships have been built, under construction, or planned to PC 1, the highest ice class specified by the IACS.

== See also ==
- Ice class, general overview of building ships to deal with ice; various classifications listed
- Finnish-Swedish ice class
- Russian Maritime Register of Shipping § Ice class
