= CCGS Louis S. St-Laurent =

Canadian Coast Guard icebreaker built in 1969

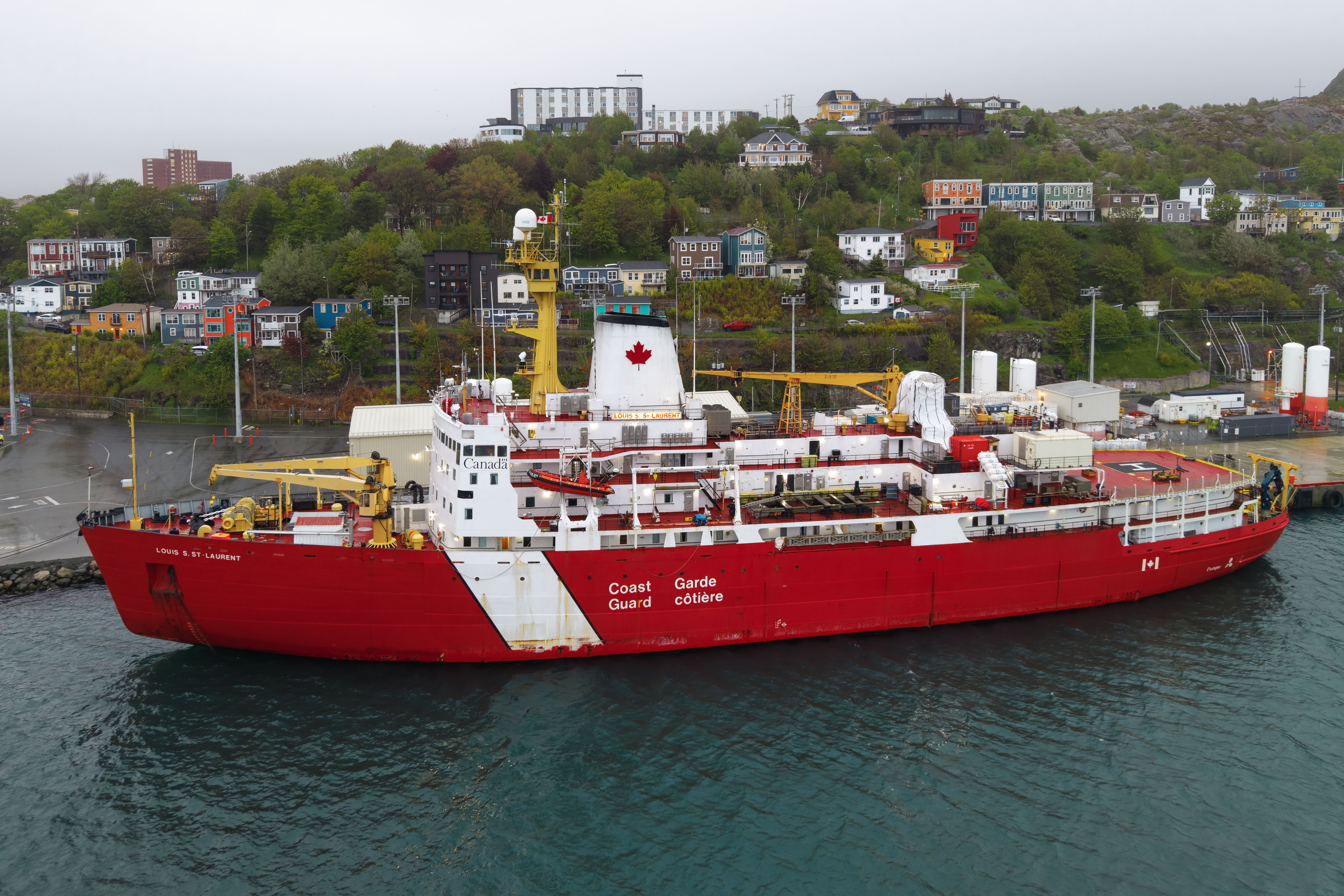
- The icebreaker and flagship of the Canadian Coast Guard, CCGS Louis S. St-Laurent berthed in St. John's, Newfoundland and Labrador

History

Canada
- Name: Louis S. St-Laurent
- Namesake: Louis St. Laurent
- Owner: Government of Canada
- Operator: Canadian Coast Guard
- Port of registry: Ottawa, Ontario
- Route: Atlantic coastline and eastern Arctic
- Builder: Canadian Vickers, Montreal
- Launched: 3 June 1966
- Commissioned: 1969
- In service: 1969–present
- Refit: 1988–1993 (Halifax Shipyards); 2000
- Home port: CCG Base St. John's, NL (Newfoundland and Labrador Region)
- Identification: IMO number: 6705937; Call sign: CGBN; MMSI number: 316165000
- Status: in active service

General characteristics (after refit)
- Type: Heavy icebreaker (CCG)
- Tonnage: 11,345 GT; 3,403 NT; 4,640 DWT
- Displacement: 15,324 tons (full)
- Length: 119.8 m (393.04 ft)
- Beam: 24.38 m (79.99 ft)
- Draught: 9.91 m (32.51 ft)
- Depth: 16.3 m (53.48 ft)
- Installed power: 5 × Krupp MaK 16M453C (5 × 5,880 kW)
- Propulsion: Diesel-electric (AC/DC); Three shafts (3 × 6,714 kW); Three fixed-pitch propellers
- Speed: 16 knots (30 km/h; 18 mph)
- Range: 23,000 nautical miles (43,000 km)
- Endurance: 205 days
- Boats & landing craft carried: 1 × Zodiac Hurricane RHIB; 2 × workboat/lifeboat; 1 × LCM barge
- Complement: 46
- Aircraft carried: 2 × Bell 429

CCGS Louis S. St-Laurent (French: NGCC Louis S. St-Laurent) is a Canadian Coast Guard (CCG) heavy icebreaker. Louis S. St-Laurent's home port is St. John's, Newfoundland and Labrador. She is the largest icebreaker and flagship of the CCG.

The ship is named after Louis St. Laurent, who served as the 12th prime minister of Canada from 1948 to 1957.

== Operations ==
Louis S. St-Laurent is based at CCG Base St. John's in St. John's, Newfoundland. The vessel's current operation tempo consists of summer voyages to Canada's Arctic where she supports the annual Arctic sealift to various coastal communities and carries out multi-disciplinary scientific expeditions. During the winter months, Louis S. St-Laurent sometimes operates in the Gulf of St. Lawrence to aid ships in transiting to Montreal, Quebec, although she usually only serves this assignment during particularly heavy ice years.

Since entering service in 1969, the icebreaker has been compelled to go through several refits in order to keep her in service. In November 2020 the federal government announced that it would endeavour to keep the vessel in service through the 2020s. Refits were planned to take place at the Davie Shipyard over three 5-month dry-docking periods in 2022, 2024 and 2027 respectively, with an alongside work period in 2023.

== History ==
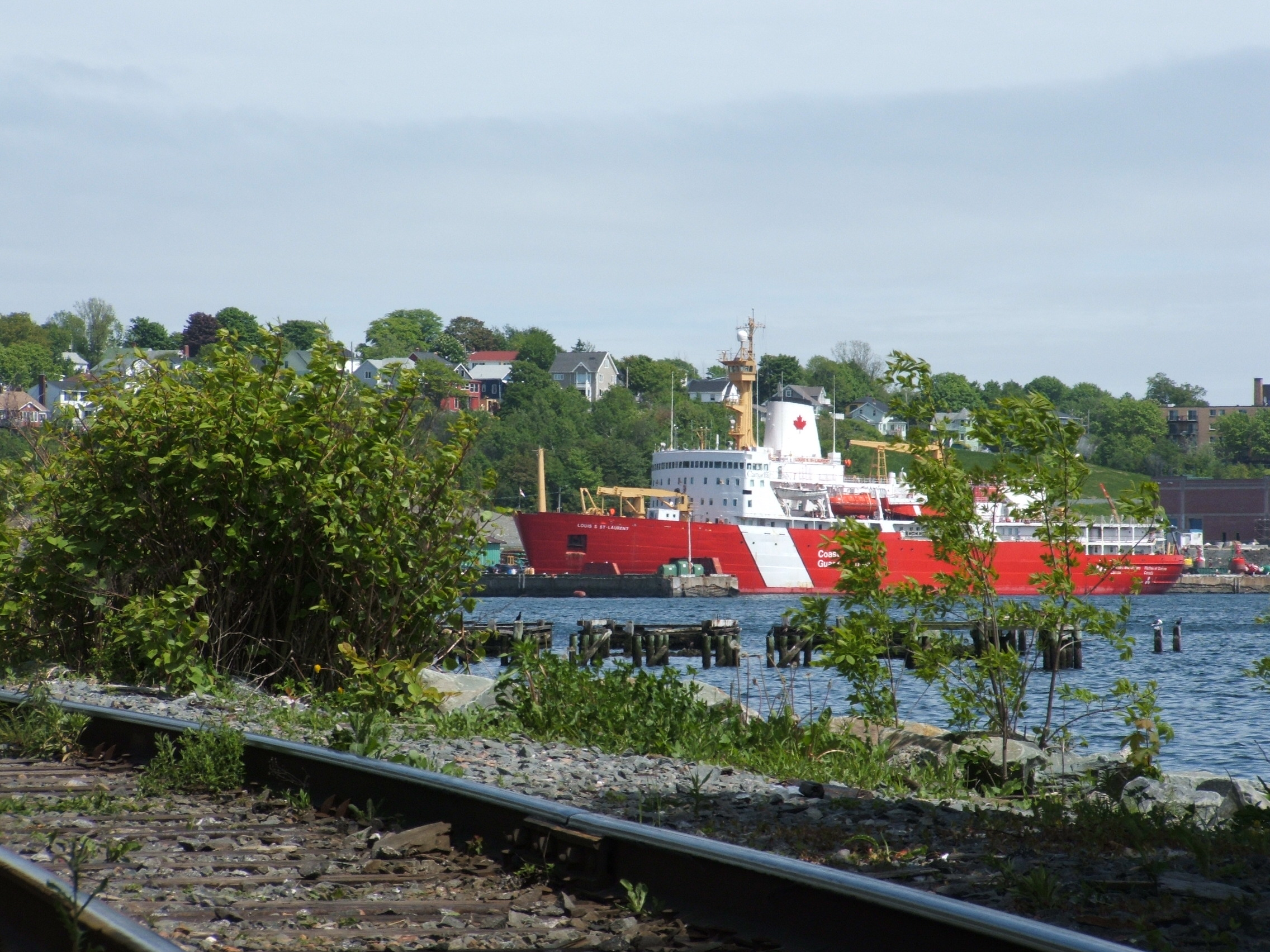
Louis S. St-Laurent alongside the pier at her (then) homeport, CCG Base Dartmouth, in June 2007.

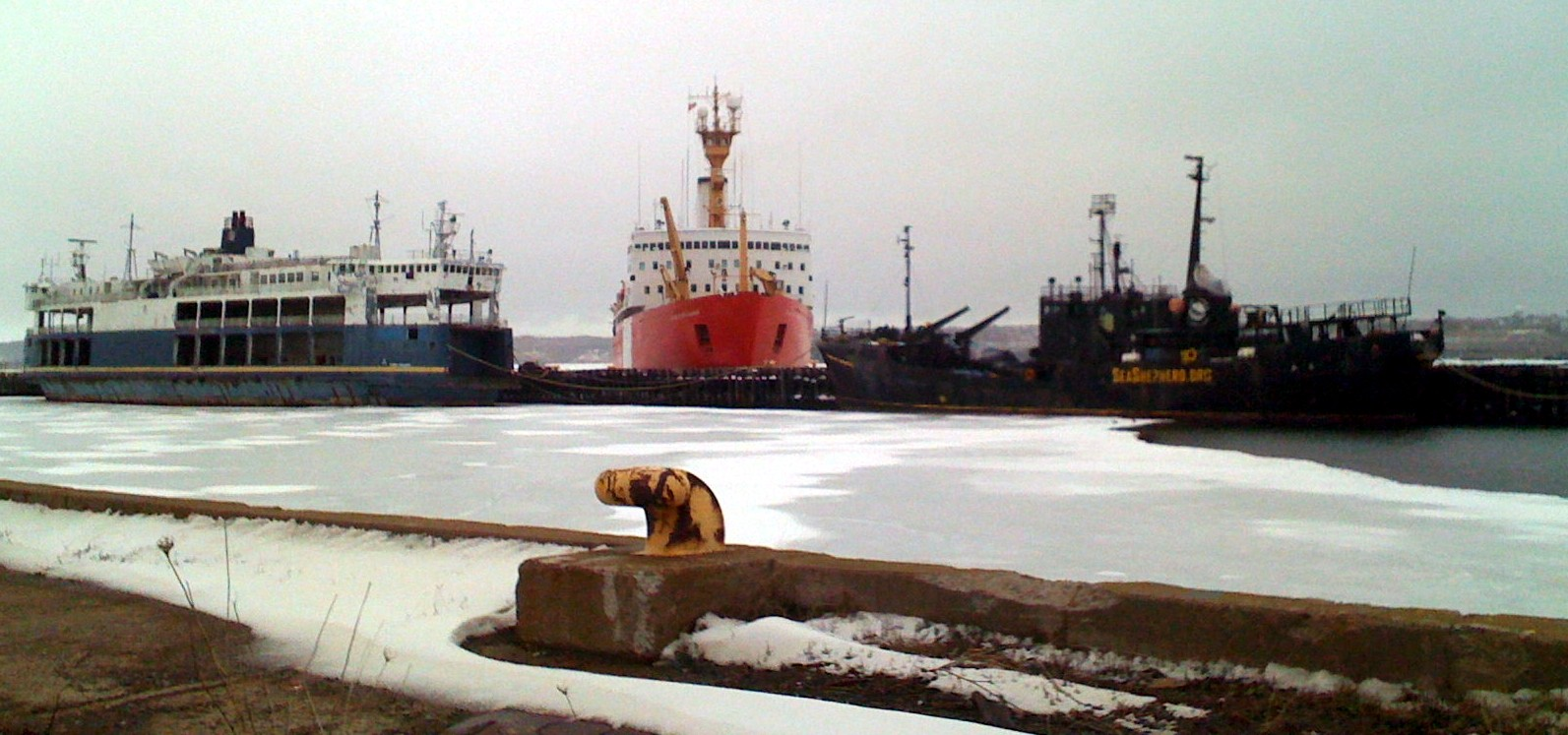
MV Fundy Paradise, Louis S. St-Laurent, and RV Farley Mowat at Sydport in Point Edward, Nova Scotia, March 2009.

Louis S. St. Laurent was launched 3 December 1966 by Canadian Vickers Limited at Montreal, Quebec, and commissioned in October 1969.

From 8–22 September 1969 Louis S. St-Laurent sailed on the SS Manhattan expedition in the Northwest Passage. She was assisted by CCGS John A. Macdonald and the United States Coast Guard vessels USCGC Northwind and USCGC Staten Island.

During 1976 Louis S. St-Laurent, Captain Paul M. Fournier in command, made a partial transit of the Northwest Passage travelling from east to west, through Lancaster Sound, Peel Sound, and Victoria Strait.

In 1979 Louis S. St-Laurent, Captain George Burdock in command, made a full east to west transit of the Northwest Passage. She assisted CCGS Franklin, and circumnavigated North America.

Louis S. St-Laurent underwent an extensive and costly modernization at Halifax Shipyard Ltd. in Halifax, Nova Scotia, between 1988 and 1993 which saw her hull lengthened as well as new propulsion and navigation equipment installed.

The modernization program was controversial as the government of Prime Minister Brian Mulroney had initially proposed building a class of mega icebreakers (the Polar 8 Project) for promoting Canadian sovereignty in territorial waters claimed by Canada; USCGC Polar Sea had made an unauthorized transit of Canada's Northwest Passage in 1985 early in Mulroney's administration, provoking a strong nationalist out-cry across the country. However, budget cuts in the late 1980s saw proposed expansions of the coast guard and armed forces scrapped. In compensation to the coast guard, the government opted to modernize the largest icebreaker in its fleet, Louis S. St-Laurent.

On 22 August 1994 Louis S. St-Laurent and USCGC Polar Sea became the first North American surface vessels to reach the North Pole.

In the summer of 2006, CBC TV's The National broadcast from Louis S. St-Laurent in a special series focused on climate change.

The vessel was originally scheduled to be decommissioned in 2000 however a refit extended the decommissioning date to 2017. In the 26 February 2008 federal budget, the Government of Canada announced it was funding a $721 million "Polar Class Icebreaker" as a replacement vessel for Louis S. St-Laurent. However, this mooted replacement vessel has been continually delayed compelling the life of Louis St. Laurent to be significantly extended.

In 2014, with CCGS Terry Fox, Louis S. St-Laurent performed a cruise to the Arctic to map the undersea continental shelf. The two vessels were slowed by thick ice.

At 1:30 a.m. on 2 April 2015, Louis S. St-Laurent, arrived near Burgeo, Newfoundland and Labrador, to take the damaged Canadian Coast Guard vessel CCGS Ann Harvey under tow. Ann Harvey, which had run aground near Burgeo, was already being towed by the lifeboat CCGS W.G. George when the icebreaker arrived. Louis S. St-Laurent took over the tow and brought Ann Harvey into Connoire Bay where Royal Canadian Navy divers could inspect the ship.

In 2016 Louis S. St-Laurent was deployed to the Arctic carrying an international team of scientists mapping the sea floor. The first leg of the mission was a voyage to Norway mapping the Atlantic. This was to be followed by a 47-day leg to the North Pole. Travelling with the Swedish icebreaker Oden, Louis S. St-Laurent's mission to the Arctic was the last of three performed in order to define Canada's claim to the Arctic continental shelf. While mapping during transit to the north, the scientists aboard the ship discovered a chain of 25–30 undersea volcanoes off the coast of Greenland.

On 22 March 2019, CCGS Captain Molly Kool and Louis S. St-Laurent were dispatched to aid the tanker Jana Desgagnes which had damaged a rudder in heavy ice and lost steering 16 nautical miles (30 km; 18 mi) southwest of Port-aux-Basques, Newfoundland. Captain Molly Kool towed the vessel further out to sea to await the arrival of a tugboat, which would take the tanker to Sydney, Nova Scotia, for repairs.
