= CCGS Arpatuuq =

Canadian Heavy Polar Icebreaker

- Conceptual rendering of the future CCGS Arpatuuq

History

Canada
- Name: Arpatuuq
- Namesake: Akpatok Island
- Owner: Government of Canada
- Operator: Canadian Coast Guard
- Ordered: 8 March 2025
- Builder: Helsinki Shipyard (Helsinki, Finland); Davie Shipbuilding (Lévis, Quebec)
- Cost: C$3.26 billion (Note: Including C$14.3 million ancillary contract)
- Yard number: 520 (Helsinki)
- Completed: 2030 (planned)
- Identification: IMO number: 1118725
- Status: Under construction

General characteristics
- Type: Icebreaker
- Displacement: 22,800 tonnes (22,400 long tons)
- Length: 138.5 m (454 ft 5 in)
- Beam: 29.4 m (96 ft 5 in)
- Ice class: Polar Class 2
- Installed power: 4 × Wärtsilä 16V31 (4 × 9,760 kW)
- Propulsion: Diesel-electric; two azimuth thrusters and one shaftline
- Crew: 100
- Aviation facilities: Helipad and hangar

CCGS Arpatuuq (Inuktitut: [aʁpatuːq]) is a future Canadian Coast Guard icebreaker being built under the Polar Icebreaker Project as part of the National Shipbuilding Strategy. Its construction began at Helsinki Shipyard in Finland in August 2025 and the vessel is expected to join the fleet after outfitting at Davie Shipbuilding in Canada by 2030.

== Development and construction ==
=== Background ===
On 28 February 2008, Prime Minister Stephen Harper announced a plan to build a new polar icebreaker. The construction of the vessel was included in the National Shipbuilding Procurement Strategy (Note: National Shipbuilding Strategy since 2016) and awarded to Seaspan Vancouver Shipyards on 19 October 2011 as part of the C$8 billion non-combat vessel work package. At the time, the Quebec-based Davie Shipbuilding was undergoing financial restructuring and was disqualified from bidding for the project. After emerging from insolvency, the shipyard submitted several unsolicited proposals to deliver a polar icebreaker to the Government of Canada.

In June 2019, the Government of Canada replaced the one-off polar icebreaker in Seaspan's orderbook, initially scheduled for delivery in 2017 and now several years behind schedule, with sixteen smaller multipurpose vessels while it would continue exploring options to build the polar icebreaker possibly at another shipyard. On 28 February 2020, a request for information was issued to all Canadian shipyards, inviting them to provide information to the Government of Canada on domestic shipyard capability and capacity to construct and deliver a polar icebreaker. On 6 May 2021, the Government of Canada announced that two polar icebreakers would be procured, one from Seaspan Vancouver Shipyards and the other from Davie Shipbuilding; the latter had pre-qualified as the third shipyard under the National Shipbuilding Strategy in December 2019 and was formally accepted by Prime Minister Justin Trudeau on 4 April 2023. On 16 September 2024, the Government of Canada awarded Davie Shipbuilding a C$14.3 million ancillary contract to advance work on the second polar icebreaker.

On 8 March 2025, the Government of Canada awarded a C$3.25 billion contract to Davie Shipbuilding for the construction of the second polar icebreaker under the National Shipbuilding Strategy. In order to accelerate its production, the vessel would be built jointly with the Finnish shipbuilding Helsinki Shipyard that Davie had acquired from its previous Russian owner in 2023.

=== Construction ===
The construction of the polar icebreaker began with a steel cutting ceremony in Finland on 20 August 2025. This was followed by a production start in Quebec on 31 March 2026. Hull assembly began in Helsinki on 28 May 2026. Some blocks are also assembled by BLRT Western Shipyard in Klaipėda, Lithuania.

CCGS Arpatuuq is scheduled to be delivered to the Canadian Coast Guard in 2030.

== Design ==
=== General characteristics ===
Arpatuuq will be based on Davie's Polar Max concept. The vessel will be 138.5 metres (454 ft 5 in) long overall, have a beam of 29.4 metres (96 ft 5 in), and have a displacement of 22,800 tonnes (22,400 long tons). Its onboard facilities are similar to those of the slightly bigger polar icebreaker under construction at Seaspan Vancouver Shipyards: accommodation for 100 persons, helicopter deck and hangar for two helicopters, laboratories and a moon pool, and ability to transport cargo, participate in oil spill response operations, and carry out emergency towing year-round.

The vessel will be classified by Lloyd's Register of Shipping. Its ice class, Polar Class 2, is the second highest ice class according to the International Association of Classification Societies (IACS) Unified Requirements for Polar Class Ships and intended for "year-round operation in moderate multi-year ice conditions".

=== Power and propulsion ===
Arpatuuq will be fitted with a fully integrated diesel-electric propulsion system consisting of four 16-cylinder Wärtsilä 16V31 four-stroke medium-speed diesel generating sets rated at 9,760 kilowatts (13,090 hp) each. The ship's triple-screw propulsion system will consist of two azimuth thrusters on the sides and a fixed shaftline in the middle. For maneuvering and dynamic positioning, it will also have two bow thrusters.

The polar icebreaker will be capable of breaking 2-metre (6.6 ft) ice at a continuous speed of 3 knots (5.6 km/h; 3.5 mph).
