= Polar Icebreaker Project =

Canadian shipbuilding program

- Conceptual renderings of the future Canadian polar icebreakers CCGS Imnaryuaq built by Seaspan (above) and CCGS Arpatuuq by Davie (below); not to scale

Class overview
- Builders: Seaspan Vancouver Shipyards (North Vancouver, British Columbia); Davie Shipbuilding (Lévis, Quebec); Helsinki Shipyard (Helsinki, Finland)
- Operators: Canadian Coast Guard
- Cost: C$4.27 billion (Seaspan); C$3.26 billion (Davie)
- Built: 2025– (planned)
- In commission: 2030– (planned)
- Planned: 2
- Building: 2

The Polar Icebreaker Project (previously Polar Class Icebreaker Project) is an ongoing Canadian shipbuilding program under the National Shipbuilding Strategy. Announced in 2008 with an intention to replace the ageing CCGS Louis S. St-Laurent with a new polar icebreaker by 2017, the program has faced multiple delays and changes, and as of 2025 consists of two planned icebreakers, CCGS Arpatuuq and CCGS Imnaryuaq, with the first vessel expected to enter service in 2030. As of May 2026, both icebreakers are under construction.

== Project history ==
=== Background ===
Following SS Manhattan's voyage through the Arctic Archipelago in 1969, Canada began planning the construction of polar icebreakers to assert its sovereignty in the Arctic and defend its claim of Northwest Passage as internal waters rather than international straits. However, neither the conventionally-powered icebreaker referred to as Polar 7 (Note: The number refers to the ship's "Arctic Class" in accordance with the Canadian Arctic Shipping Pollution Prevention Regulations and denotes the thickness of the ice in feet that the icebreaker can break at a continuous speed of 3 knots (5.6 km/h; 3.5 mph).) nor the nuclear-powered Polar 10 developed by the Montreal-based naval architecture firm German & Milne in the 1970s progressed beyond planning stage, the former due to excessive fuel costs and the latter due to difficulties in procuring the power plant. In the early 1980s, the Canadian government revised its plans and contracted German & Milne to develop a less expensive conventionally-powered polar icebreaker for the Canadian Coast Guard. As part of what became known as the Polar 8 Project, the Canadian shipbuilders Burrard-Yarrows, Davie Shipbuilding, and Saint John Shipbuilding and Dry Dock were invited to submit detailed construction proposals.

In August 1985, the United States Coast Guard icebreaker USCGC Polar Sea transited the Northwest Passage from Greenland to Alaska without formal authorization from Canada. In response, on 10 September 1985 the Canadian government announced the construction of the Polar 8 as a visible indication of Canadian sovereignty over the Arctic Archipelago. While the evaluation of the shipyards' bids was underway, the government received unsolicited proposals from Dome Petroleum and Canadian Marine Drilling (Canmar), Atlantic Towing Limited and Cleaver & Walkingshaw, and the Canadian subsidiary of the Finnish shipbuilder Wärtsilä claiming that all three proponents could develop and deliver an Arctic Class 8 icebreaker that would meet all requirements at substantially lower cost and shorter delivery time than the original Polar 8 design developed by German & Milne. A committee formed by the government concluded that a revised design could be built in Canada at reduced cost.

On 2 March 1987, the Canadian government signed a letter of intent for the construction of the Polar 8 to Versatile Pacific Shipyards (formerly Burrard-Yarrows) of North Vancouver, British Columbia. Later in that year, a design contract was awarded to Polar Icebreaker Constructors, a joint venture between Versatile and Sandwell Swan Wooster. However, the shipyard soon ran into financial difficulties and was put up for sale in December 1988. The initial cost estimate also turned out to be optimistic and when the attempts to address the skyrocketing cost with design changes turned out unsuccessful, the Polar 8 Project was placed on hold in 1989 and officially cancelled on 19 February 1990. Versatile Pacific Shipyards filed for bankruptcy shortly thereafter.

Instead of building a new polar icebreaker, the Canadian government opted to modernize CCGS Louis S. St-Laurent and purchase a former commercial icebreaker, Terry Fox, as a stopgap measure.

=== National Shipbuilding Procurement Strategy ===
On 28 February 2008, Prime Minister Stephen Harper announced the Polar Class Icebreaker Project, a plan to build a new polar icebreaker named after Canada's 13th prime minister John Diefenbaker whose government founded the Canadian Coast Guard in 1962. Upon completion, the C$720 million vessel would replace the 1969-built CCGS Louis S. St-Laurent that was due for decommissioning in 2017.

On 3 June 2010, the Government of Canada announced the National Shipbuilding Procurement Strategy (NSPS), a long-term plan to support Canada's shipbuilding industry by building ships for the Royal Canadian Navy and the Canadian Coast Guard. On 19 October 2011, Seaspan Vancouver Shipyards was awarded the non-combat package which included the construction of joint support ships for the Royal Canadian Navy and offshore science vessels as well as the polar icebreaker for the Canadian Coast Guard.

On 3 February 2012, the Government of Canada awarded the design contract to the Vancouver-based STX Canada Marine (Note: Part of Vard Marine since 2014) following a request for proposal released in June 2011. The Canadian company, formerly known as Wärtsilä Arctic Inc. and originally established to pursue the Polar 8 Project, would be supported a design team including the Finnish engineering company Aker Arctic that had been spun off from the former Wärtsilä Helsinki Shipyard to specialize in icebreaker design and ice model testing. The design work would be based on a concept developed by the Canadian Coast Guard and was expected to take 18 to 24 months to complete. In October 2012, a 1:25 scale model of the polar icebreaker was being evaluated in at the National Research Council's Institute for Ocean Technology in St. John's with additional testing taking place at Aker Arctic's ice laboratory in Finland.

In May 2013, the Vancouver Sun reported that the polar icebreaker and the Royal Canadian Navy's new joint support ships faced a scheduling conflict and that the Harper government would have to choose which project had priority. On 11 October 2013, the NSPS Secretariat announced that the joint support ships would be built first. With the polar icebreaker delayed until at least 2021–2022, the Government of Canada was forced to keep CCGS Louis S. St-Laurent in service with service life extensions.

In November 2013, it was reported that the budget for the polar icebreaker was revised up to C$1.3 billion, almost twice the initial estimate given in August 2008.

=== National Shipbuilding Strategy ===
In March 2016, the Canadian government shipbuilding program was renamed National Shipbuilding Strategy. Although at the time there were plans to begin negotiations on a construction engineering contract for the polar icebreaker in 2017, in subsequent years the project was put on hold with no activities planned until work on other projects had advanced.

In June 2019, the Government of Canada replaced the one-off polar icebreaker in Seaspan's non-combat vessel portfolio with sixteen smaller multipurpose vessels while it would continue exploring options to build the polar icebreaker possibly at another shipyard. On 28 February 2020, a request for information was issued to all Canadian shipyards, inviting them to provide information to the Government of Canada on domestic shipyard capability and capacity to construct and deliver a polar icebreaker. On 6 May 2021, the Government of Canada announced that it would procure two polar icebreakers, one of which would be built by Seaspan Vancouver Shipyards and the other by Davie Shipbuilding, with the first vessel entering service in 2030.

The development of the Canadian Coast Guard polar icebreaker picked up again in early 2021. Design updates since have included changing the propulsion layout and substituting the extra high tensile steel that was previously identified as a potential major risk item.

In December 2022, the Government of Canada awarded Seaspan the Construction Engineering (CE) and long lead items contracts for the first polar icebreaker. Together with a previously-awarded ancillary contract, the three initial contracts were worth C$1.12 billion. These were followed by the C$3.15 billion construction contract on 7 March 2025.

On 4 April 2023, Davie Shipbuilding was officially incorporated in the National Shipbuilding Strategy. On 16 September 2024, the Government of Canada awarded Davie Shipbuilding a C$14.3 million ancillary contract to advance work on the second polar icebreaker. On 8 March 2025, the Government of Canada awarded Davie the C$3.25 billion construction contract. Whereas the icebreaker built by Seaspan will be based on a design originally provided by the Government of Canada, Davie will be building a vessel based on the shipyard's own, slightly smaller Polar Max design. The icebreaker will be built jointly with Helsinki Shipyard in Finland.

On 19 August 2024, the Government of Canada announced that the icebreakers would be named CCGS Arpatuuq and CCGS Imnaryuaq. The names, chosen together with the Inuit Tapiriit Kanatami, refer to the Akpatok Island and Nelson Head, respectively.

In December 2021, the Parliamentary Budget Officer estimated that the cost of the two polar icebreakers had increased to C$7.25 billion. A later report published in June 2024 estimated that the cost for two ships had further increased to C$8.5 billion. As of March 2025, the total value of the contracts awarded to the two shipyards has been about C$7.53 billion.

In March 2026, Canadian prime minister Mark Carney announced nearly CAN$35 billion in funding to strengthen Canada's Arctic infrastructure, including upgrades to military facilities and the construction of new icebreakers to expand the country's operational capacity in the region.

=== Construction ===
The construction of the first vessel, the future CCGS Imnaryuaq, began at Seaspan on 3 April 2025 and the keel was laid on 14 October 2026.

Davie began construction of the second vessel, the future CCGS Arpatuuq, in August 2025.
