= CCGS Imnaryuaq =

Canadian Heavy Polar Icebreaker

- Conceptual rendering of the future CCGS Imnaryuaq

History

Canada
- Name: Imnaryuaq
- Namesake: Inuktitut name for Nelson Head
- Owner: Government of Canada
- Operator: Canadian Coast Guard
- Ordered: 7 March 2025
- Builder: Seaspan Vancouver Shipyards
- Cost: C$4.27 billion
- Yard number: 198
- Laid down: 14 October 2026
- Completed: 2032 (planned)
- Home port: St. John's, Newfoundland and Labrador
- Status: Under construction

General characteristics
- Type: Icebreaker
- Displacement: 26,036 t (25,625 long tons)
- Length: 158.2 m (519 ft 0 in)
- Beam: 28 m (91 ft 10 in)
- Draught: 10.5 m (34 ft 5 in)
- Ice class: Polar Class 2 Icebreaker(+)
- Installed power: 4 × Wärtsilä 16V31; 2 × Wärtsilä 8V31; about 47 MW (63,000 hp) (combined)
- Propulsion: Diesel-electric; two ABB Azipod units and one shaft, 34 MW (45,600 hp) (combined)
- Speed: 20 knots (37 km/h; 23 mph) (maximum); 12 knots (22 km/h; 14 mph) (cruise); 3 knots (5.6 km/h; 3.5 mph) in 2.5 m (8.2 ft) ice and 30 cm (12 in) snow
- Range: Over 26,200 nmi (48,500 km; 30,200 mi) in Sea State 3
- Endurance: 25 days (full power); 270 days (logistical)
- Crew: 60 (core crew); 40 (program personnel)
- Aircraft carried: 2 × medium-lift helicopters
- Aviation facilities: Helipad and hangar

CCGS Imnaryuaq is a future Canadian Coast Guard icebreaker under construction at Seaspan Vancouver Shipyards under the Polar Icebreaker Project as part of the National Shipbuilding Strategy. The ship was initially expected to join the fleet by 2017 but has been significantly delayed and is now expected by 2032.

The ship was originally to be named CCGS John G. Diefenbaker after John G. Diefenbaker, Canada's 13th prime minister whose government founded the Canadian Coast Guard in 1962, but the new name was announced on 19 August 2024.

== Development and construction ==
=== Background ===
On 28 February 2008, Prime Minister Stephen Harper announced a plan to build a new polar icebreaker named after Canada's 13th prime minister John Diefenbaker whose government founded the Canadian Coast Guard in 1962. Later included in the National Shipbuilding Procurement Strategy, (Note: National Shipbuilding Strategy since 2016) the C$720 million vessel would replace the 1969-built CCGS Louis S. St-Laurent that was due for decommissioning in 2017. The construction was awarded to Seaspan Vancouver Shipyards on 19 October 2011, followed by a design contract for a team led by STX Canada Marine on 3 February 2012.

In May 2013, the Vancouver Sun reported that the polar icebreaker and the Royal Canadian Navy's new joint support ships faced a scheduling conflict and that the Harper government would have to choose which project had priority. On 11 October 2013, the NSPS Secretariat announced that the joint support ships would be built first, followed by the polar icebreaker.

After a brief hiatus, the development of the Canadian Coast Guard polar icebreaker picked up again in 2021. Design updates since have included changing the propulsion layout and substituting the extra high tensile steel that was previously identified as a potential major risk item.

In December 2022, the Government of Canada awarded Seaspan the Construction Engineering (CE) and long lead items contracts for the first polar icebreaker. Together with a previously awarded ancillary contract, the three initial contracts were worth C$1.12 billion. These were followed by the C$3.15 billion construction contract on 7 March 2025.

=== Construction ===
The construction of the future CCGS Imnaryuaq began on 3 April 2025 and the keel was laid on 14 October 2026. The vessel is projected to enter service in 2032.

== Design ==
=== General characteristics ===
Imnaryuaq will have an overall length of 158.2 metres (519 ft) and beam of 28.0 metres (91 ft 10 in). With a draft of 10.5 metres (34 ft 5 in), the icebreaker will have a displacement of 26,036 tonnes (25,625 long tons). She is projected to have a core crew of 60 and accommodation for additional 40 project personnel. Her facilities will include laboratories and modular mission spaces, a moon pool, general purpose cargo hold and garage, multiple cranes, and a helideck and hangar for two medium-lift helicopters. In addition, she will be capable of receiving and refueling larger helicopters.

Imnaryuaq will be classified by Lloyd's Register of Shipping. Her ice class will be Polar Class 2, the second highest ice class according to the International Association of Classification Societies (IACS) Unified Requirements for Polar Class Ships. Furthermore, the class notation Icebreaker(+) will result in additional structural strengthening based on analysis of the vessel's operational profile potential ice loading scenarios. Imnaryuaq will be one of the first vessels to hold these class notations.

=== Power and propulsion ===
Imnaryuaq will be fitted with a fully integrated diesel-electric propulsion system consisting of four 16-cylinder Wärtsilä 16V31 and two 8-cylinder Wärtsilä 8V31 four-stroke medium-speed diesel generating sets with a combined output of about 47 MW (63,000 hp). The power plant, divided into two separate engine rooms, will provide power for all shipboard consumers from propulsion motors to lighting in the accommodation spaces.

Initially, two propulsion alternatives were proposed during the preliminary design: a traditional three-shaft configuration with a centerline rudder and a hybrid propulsion system consisting of two wing shafts and an azimuth thruster in the middle for improved maneuverability. Of these, the Canadian Coast Guard selected the latter with two 11 MW (14,800 hp) shafts and a single 12 MW (16,100 hp) azimuth thruster. This has since been swapped around to two ABB Azipod propulsion units flanking a fixed shaft in the middle. The combined shaft power, 34 MW (45,600 hp), will be almost the same as that of the Russian nuclear-powered icebreakers Taymyr and Vaygach. This will make Imnaryuaq the most powerful diesel-electric icebreaker in the world and the third most powerful non-nuclear icebreaker after the two gas turbine-powered Polar-class icebreakers operated by the United States Coast Guard. The icebreaker will also be fitted with an air bubbling system that provides hull lubrication and reduces ice friction during icebreaking operations.

For maneuvering at ports as well as stationkeeping capability in Sea State 5 and currents of up to 3 knots (5.6 km/h; 3.5 mph) in open water, Imnaryuaq will also be fitted with two 1,900 kW (2,548 hp) Steerprop bow thrusters.

=== Performance ===
Imnaryuaq is designed to break level ice with a thickness of 2.5 metres (8.2 ft) and with a 30-centimetre (12 in) snow cover at over 3 knots. This is roughly equivalent to the Russian Project 22220 nuclear-powered icebreakers. Her operational range at 12 knots (22 km/h; 14 mph) in Sea State 3 is projected to be over 26,200 nautical miles (48,500 km; 30,200 mi) and she can operate in 2.2-metre (7.2 ft) ice at full power for 25 days. The logistical endurance of the vessel will be 270 days. The new icebreaker will be able to achieve a maximum speed of about 20 knots (37 km/h; 23 mph) in open water, but her normal cruising speed is around 12 knots.
