= Icebreaker =

Ship that is able to navigate through ice-covered waters

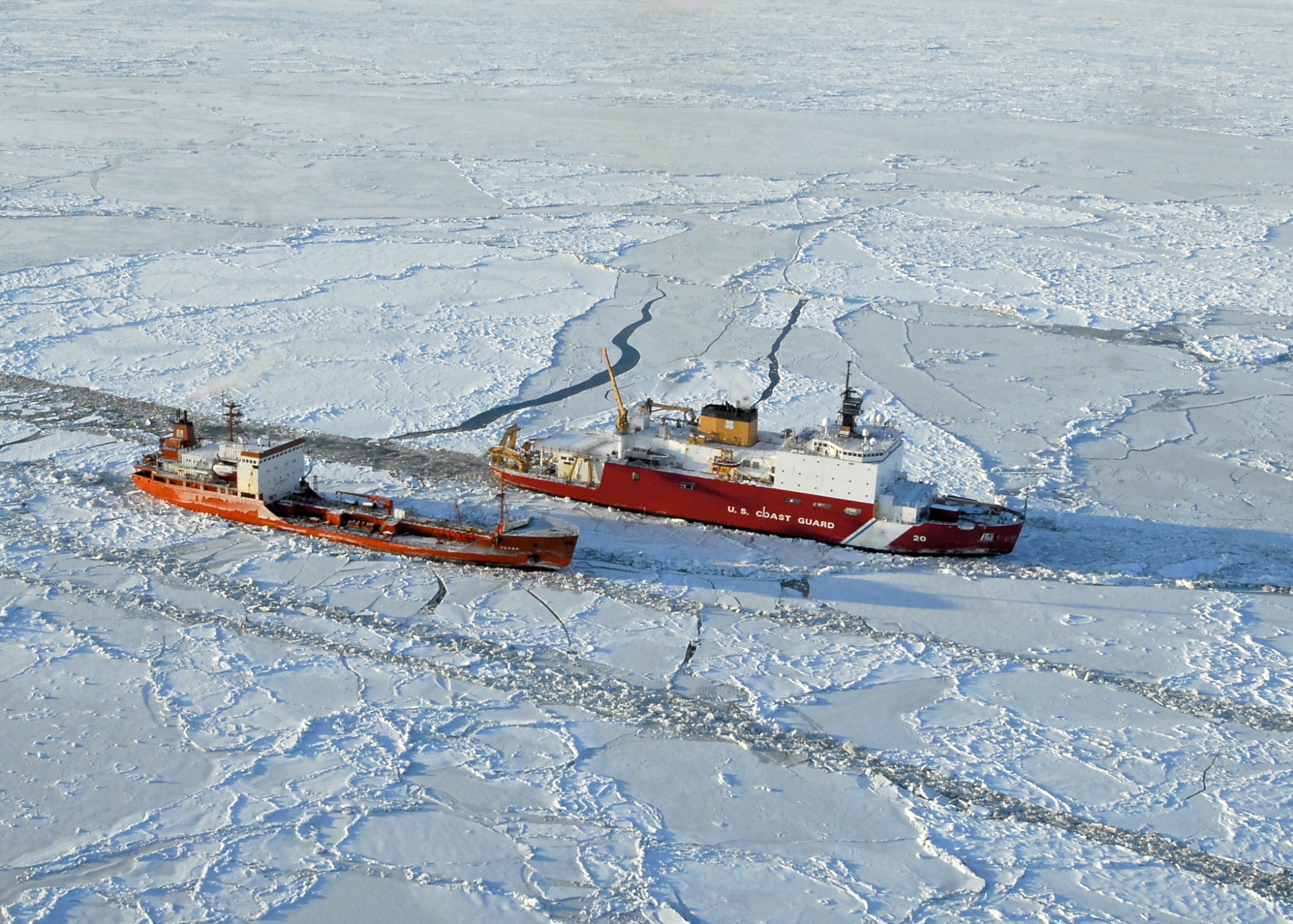
USCGC Healy (WAGB-20), at right, breaks ice around the Russian-flagged tanker Renda, 250 miles (400 km) south of Nome, Alaska, in January 2012.

An icebreaker is a special-purpose ship or boat designed to move and navigate through ice-covered waters, and provide safe waterways for other boats and ships. Although the term usually refers to ice-breaking ships, it may also refer to smaller vessels, such as the icebreaking boats that were once used on the canals of the United Kingdom.

For a ship to be considered an icebreaker, it requires three traits most normal ships lack: a strengthened hull, an ice-clearing shape, and the power to push through sea ice.

Icebreakers clear paths by pushing straight into frozen-over water or pack ice. The bending strength of sea ice is low enough that the ice breaks usually without noticeable change in the vessel's trim. In cases of very thick ice, an icebreaker can drive its bow onto the ice to break it under the weight of the ship. A buildup of broken ice in front of a ship can slow it down much more than the breaking of the ice itself, so icebreakers have a specially designed hull to direct the broken ice around or under the vessel. The external components of the ship's propulsion system (propellers, propeller shafts, etc.) are at greater risk of damage than the vessel's hull, so the ability of an icebreaker to propel itself onto the ice, break it, and clear the debris from its path successfully is essential for its safety.

== History ==
=== Earliest icebreakers ===
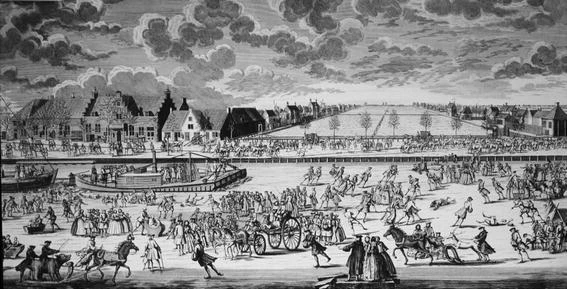
Two teams of horses and a team of workers drag an ice breaker through the canals of Amsterdam in 1733.

Prior to ocean-going ships, ice breaking technology was developed on inland canals and rivers using laborers with axes and hooks. The first recorded primitive icebreaker ship was a barge used by the Belgian town of Bruges in 1383 to help clear the town moat. The efforts of the ice-breaking barge were successful enough to warrant the town purchasing four such ships.

Ice breaking barges continued to see use during the colder winters of the Little Ice Age with growing use in the Low Country where significant amounts of trade and transport of people and goods took place. In the 15th century the use of ice breakers in Flanders (Oudenaarde, Kortrijk, Ieper, Veurne, Diksmuide and Hulst) was already well established. The use of the ice breaking barges expanded in the 17th century where every town of some importance in the Low Country used some form of icebreaker to keep their waterways clear.

Before the 17th century the specifications of icebreakers are unknown. The specifications for ice breaking vessels show that they were dragged by teams of horses and the heavy weight of the ship pushed down on the ice breaking it. They were used in conjunction with teams of men with axes and saws and the technology behind them didn't change much until the industrial revolution.

=== Sailing ships in the polar waters ===
Ice-strengthened ships were used in the earliest days of polar exploration. These were originally wooden and based on existing designs, but reinforced, particularly around the waterline with double planking to the hull and strengthening cross members inside the ship. Bands of iron were wrapped around the outside. Sometimes metal sheeting was placed at the bows, at the stern, and along the keel. Such strengthening was designed to help the ship push through ice and also to protect the ship in case it was "nipped" by the ice. Nipping occurs when ice floes around a ship are pushed against the ship, trapping it as if in a vise and causing damage. This vise-like action is caused by the force of winds and tides on ice formations.

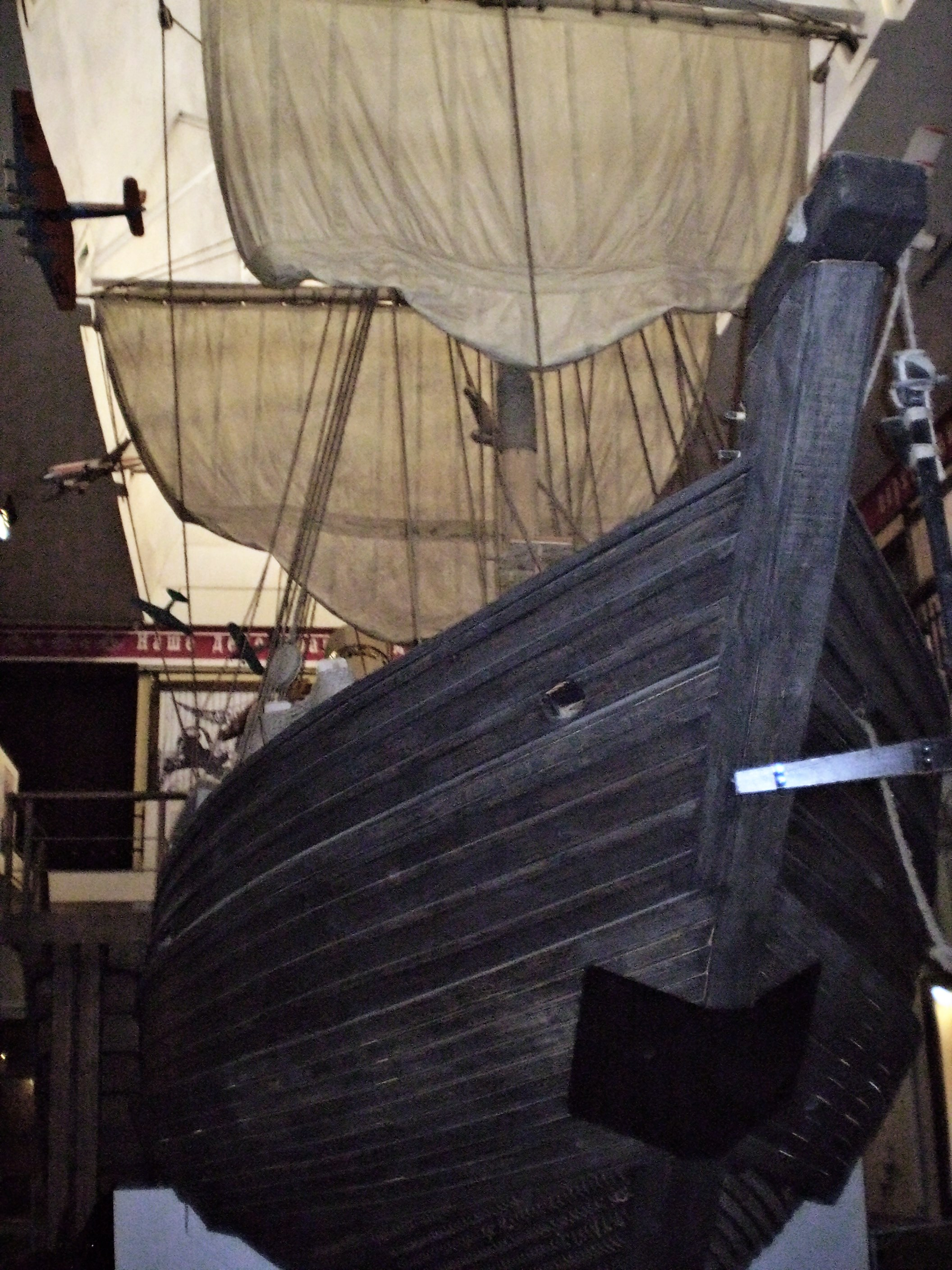
A 17th-century Russian koch in a museum

The first boats to be used in the polar waters were those of the indigenous peoples of the circumpolar regions. Their kayaks are small human-powered boats with a covered deck, and one or more cockpits, each seating one paddler who strokes a single or double-bladed paddle. Such boats have no icebreaking capabilities, but they are light and well fit to carry over the ice.

In the 9th and 10th centuries, the Viking expansion reached the North Atlantic, and eventually Greenland and Svalbard in the Arctic. Vikings, however, operated their ships in the waters that were ice-free for most of the year, in the conditions of the Medieval Warm Period.

In the 11th century, in North Russia the coasts of the White Sea, named so for being ice-covered for over half of a year, started being settled. The mixed ethnic group of the Karelians and the Russians in the North-Russia that lived on the shores of the Arctic Ocean became known as Pomors ("seaside settlers"). Gradually they developed a special type of small one- or two-mast wooden sailing ships, used for voyages in the ice conditions of the Arctic seas and later on Siberian rivers. These earliest icebreakers were called kochi. The koch's hull was protected by a belt of ice-floe resistant flush skin-planking along the variable water-line, and had a false keel for on-ice portage. If a koch became squeezed by the ice-fields, its rounded bodylines below the water-line would allow for the ship to be pushed up out of the water and onto the ice with no damage.

In the 19th century, similar protective measures were adopted to modern steam-powered icebreakers. Some notable sailing ships in the end of the Age of Sail also featured the egg-shaped form like that of Pomor boats, for example the Fram, used by Fridtjof Nansen and other great Norwegian Polar explorers. Fram was the wooden ship to have sailed farthest north (85°57'N) and farthest south (78°41'S), and one of the strongest wooden ships ever built.

=== Steam-powered icebreakers ===
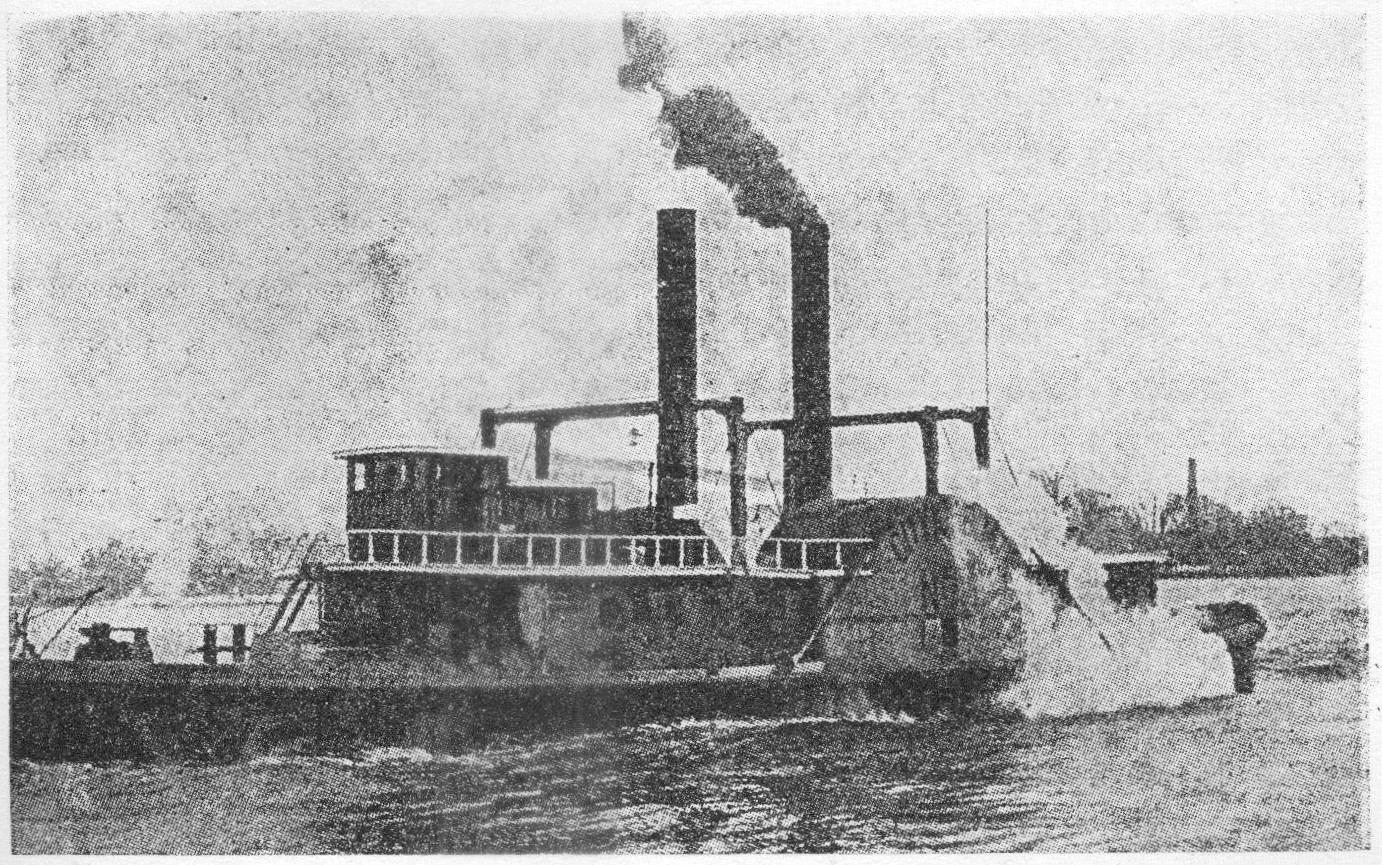
City Ice Boat No. 1 at the Delaware River. The paddle steamer was built in 1837.

An early ship designed to operate in icy conditions was a 51-metre (167 ft) wooden paddle steamer, City Ice Boat No. 1, that was built for the city of Philadelphia by Vandusen & Birelyn in 1837. The ship was powered by two 250-horsepower (190 kW) steam engines and her wooden paddles were reinforced with iron coverings.

With a rounded shape and strong metal hull, the Russian Pilot of 1864 was an important predecessor of modern icebreakers with propellers. The ship was built on the orders of merchant and shipbuilder Mikhail Britnev. She had the bow altered to achieve an ice-clearing capability (20° raise from keel line). This allowed Pilot to push herself on the top of the ice and consequently break it. Britnev fashioned the bow of his ship after the shape of old Pomor boats, which had been navigating icy waters of the White Sea and Barents Sea for centuries. Pilot was used between 1864 and 1890 for navigation in the Gulf of Finland between Kronstadt and Oranienbaum thus extending the summer navigation season by several weeks. Inspired by the success of Pilot, Mikhail Britnev built a second similar vessel Boy ("Breakage" in Russian) in 1875 and a third Booy ("Buoy" in Russian) in 1889.

The cold winter of 1870–1871 caused the Elbe River and the port of Hamburg to freeze over, causing a prolonged halt to navigation and huge commercial losses. Carl Ferdinand Steinhaus reused the altered bow Pilot's design from Britnev to make his own icebreaker, Eisbrecher I.

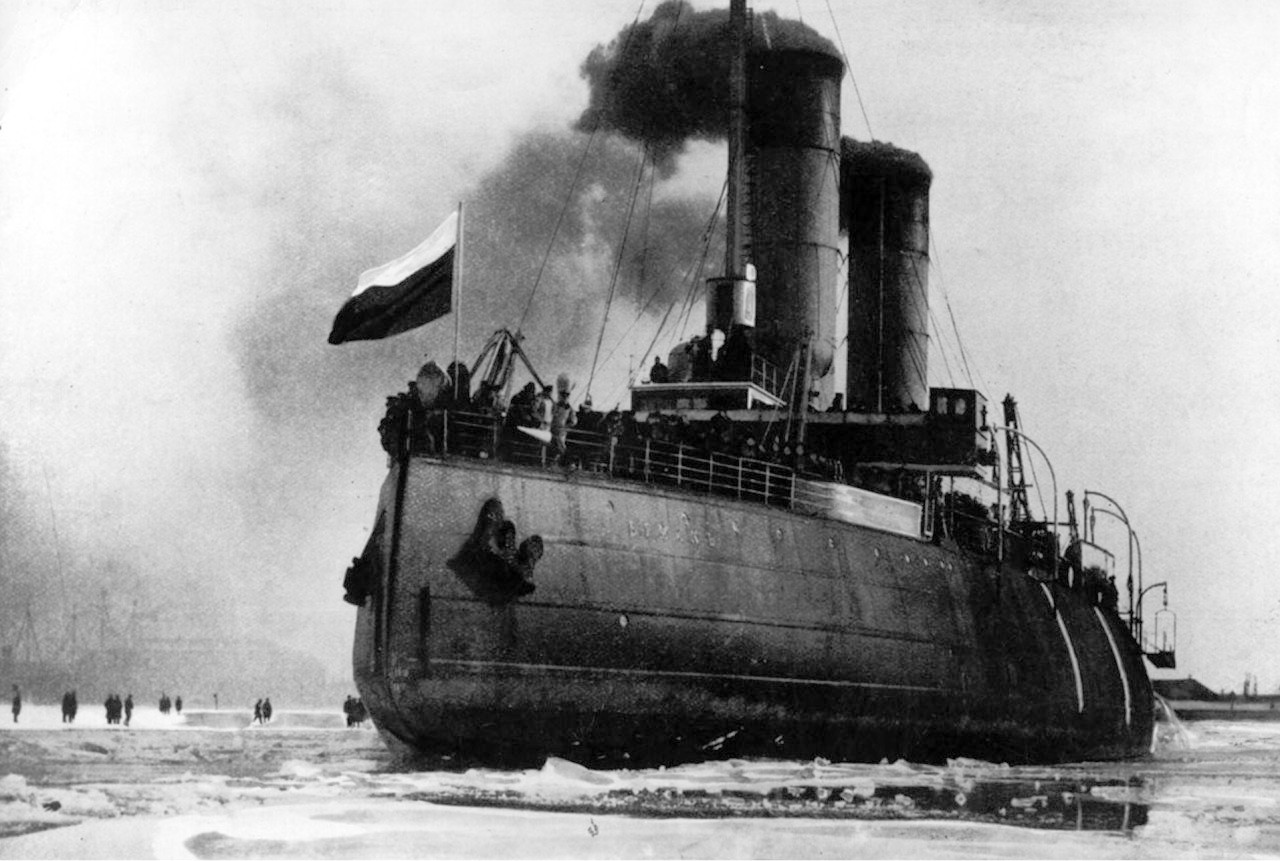
Yermak is considered the first true modern sea-going icebreaker.

The first true modern sea-going icebreaker was built at the turn of the 20th century. Icebreaker Yermak, was built in 1899 at the Armstrong Whitworth naval yard in England under contract from the Imperial Russian Navy. The ship borrowed the main principles from Pilot and applied them to the creation of the first polar icebreaker, which was able to run over and crush pack ice. The ship displaced 5,000 tons, and her steam-reciprocating engines delivered 10,000 horsepower (7,500 kW). The ship was decommissioned in 1963 and scrapped in 1964, making her one of the longest serving icebreakers in the world.

In Canada, the government needed to provide a way to prevent flooding due to ice jam on the St. Lawrence River. Icebreakers were built to maintain the river free of ice jam, east of Montréal. In about the same time, Canada had to fill its obligations in the Canadian Arctic. Large steam icebreakers, like the 80-metre (260 ft) CGS N.B. McLean (1930) and CGS D'Iberville (1952), were built for this dual use (St. Lawrence flood prevention and Arctic replenishment).

At the beginning of the 20th century, several other countries began to operate purpose-built icebreakers. Most were coastal icebreakers, but Canada, Russia, and later, the Soviet Union, also built several oceangoing icebreakers up to 11,000 tons in displacement.

=== Diesel-powered icebreakers ===
Before the first diesel-electric icebreakers were built in the 1930s, icebreakers were either coal- or oil-fired steam ships. Reciprocating steam engines were preferred in icebreakers due to their reliability, robustness, good torque characteristics, and ability to reverse the direction of rotation quickly. During the steam era, the most powerful pre-war steam-powered icebreakers had a propulsion power of about 10,000 shaft horsepower (7,500 kW).

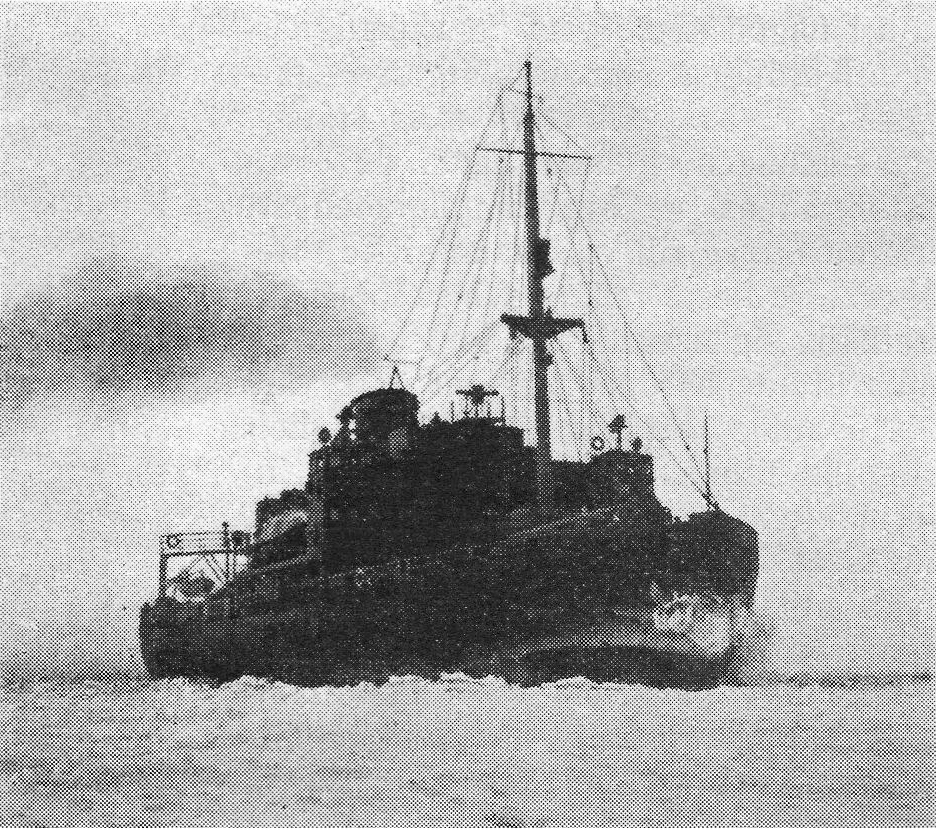
Ymer is the world's first diesel-electric icebreaker, built in 1933.

The world's first diesel-electric icebreaker was the 4,330-ton Swedish icebreaker Ymer in 1933. At 9,000 hp (6,700 kW) divided between two propellers in the stern and one propeller in the bow, she remained the most powerful Swedish icebreaker until the commissioning of Oden in 1957. Ymer was followed by the Finnish Sisu, the first diesel-electric icebreaker in Finland, in 1939. Both vessels were decommissioned in the 1970s and replaced by much larger icebreakers in both countries, the 1976-built Sisu in Finland and the 1977-built Ymer in Sweden.

In 1941, the United States started building the Wind class. Research in Scandinavia and the Soviet Union led to a design that had a very strongly built short and wide hull, with a cut away forefoot and a rounded bottom. Powerful diesel-electric machinery drove two stern and one auxiliary bow propeller. These features would become the standard for postwar icebreakers until the 1980s.

Since the mid-1970s, the most powerful diesel-electric icebreakers have been the formerly Soviet and later Russian icebreakers Ermak, Admiral Makarov and Krasin which have nine twelve-cylinder diesel generators producing electricity for three propulsion motors with a combined output of 26,500 kW (35,500 hp). After 2030 the Canadian polar icebreakers CCGS Arpatuuq and CCGS Imnaryuaq are expected to be delivered, with a combined propulsion power of 34,000 kW (46,000 hp).

==== Canada ====
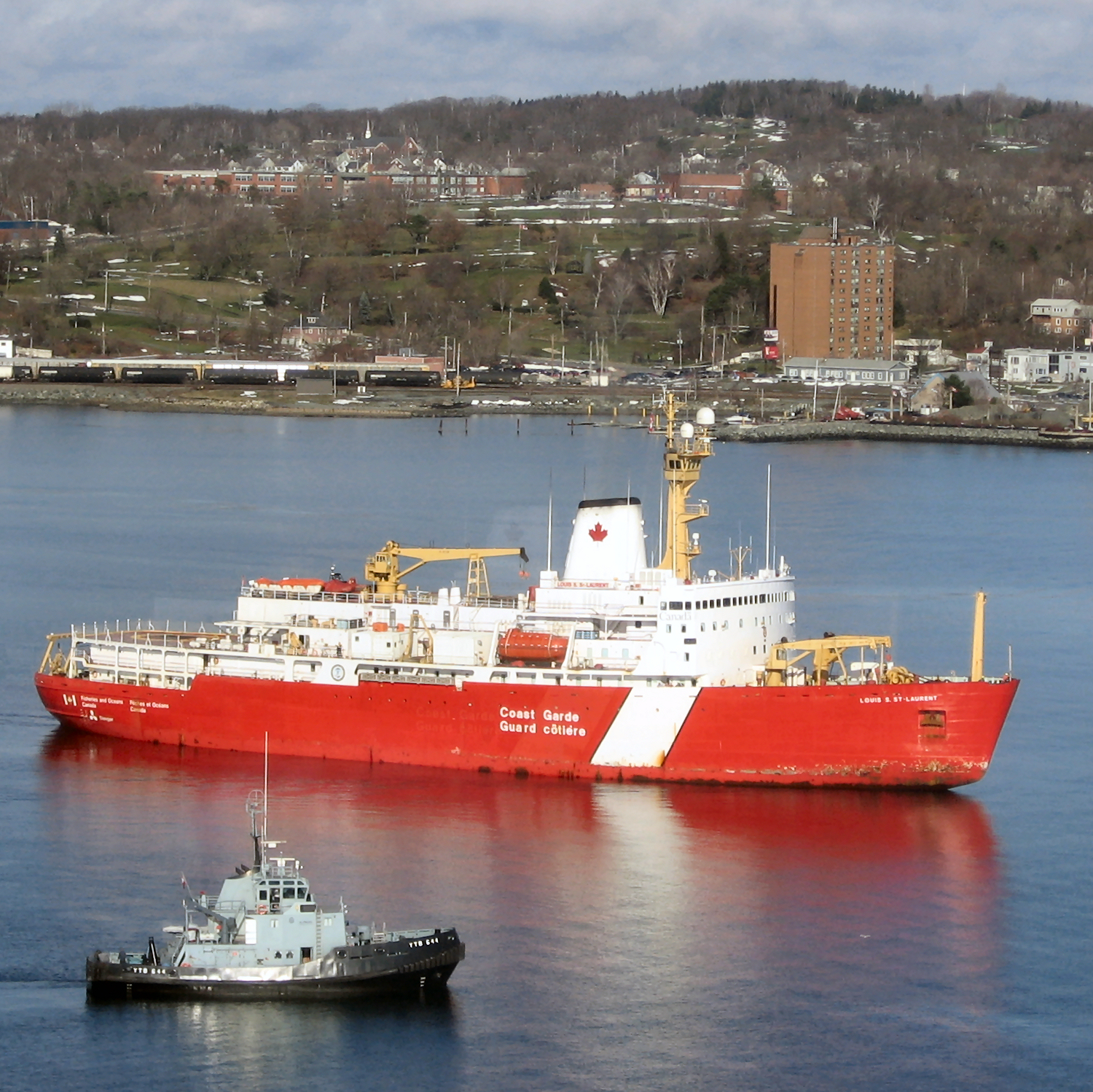
The CCGS Louis S. St-Laurent is a Canadian Coast Guard icebreaker.

In Canada, diesel-electric icebreakers started to be built in 1952, first with HMCS Labrador (was transferred later to the Canadian Coast Guard), using the USCG Wind-class design but without the bow propeller. Then in 1960, the next step in the Canadian development of large icebreakers came when CCGS John A. Macdonald was completed at Lauzon, Quebec. A considerably bigger and more powerful ship than Labrador, John A.Macdonald was an ocean-going icebreaker able to meet the most rigorous polar conditions. Her diesel-electric machinery of 15,000 horsepower (11,000 kW) was arranged in three units transmitting power equally to each of three shafts.

Canada's largest and most powerful icebreaker, the 120-metre (390 ft) CCGS Louis S. St-Laurent, was delivered in 1969. Her original three steam turbine, nine generator, and three electric motor system produces 27,000 shaft horsepower (20,000 kW). A multi-year mid-life refit project (1987–1993) saw the ship get a new bow, and a new propulsion system. The new power plant consists of five diesels, three generators, and three electric motors, giving about the same propulsion power.

On 22 August 1994 Louis S. St-Laurent and USCGC Polar Sea became the first North American surface vessels to reach the North Pole. The vessel was originally scheduled to be decommissioned in 2000; however, a refit extended the decommissioning date to 2017. It is now planned to be kept in service through the 2020s pending the introduction of two new polar icebreakers, CCGS Arpatuuq and CCGS Imnaryuaq, for the Coast Guard.

==== Finland ====
Icebreakers have long been used in Finland, a country with many ports that are not ice-free (Murtaja (1890), Sampo (1898), Apu (1899) and many others). As of 2026 Arctia is responsible for the maintenance and development of the fleet.

On 9 October 2025, US President Trump and Finnish President Stubb sealed an agreement for the U.S. Coast Guard to buy up to 11 icebreaker ships to bolster U.S. national security in the Arctic. They approved a memorandum of understanding on icebreaker cooperation.

As of January 2026, Finnish companies have designed 80% of all icebreaker ships currently in operation, and 60% were built at shipyards in Finland.

=== Nuclear-powered icebreakers ===
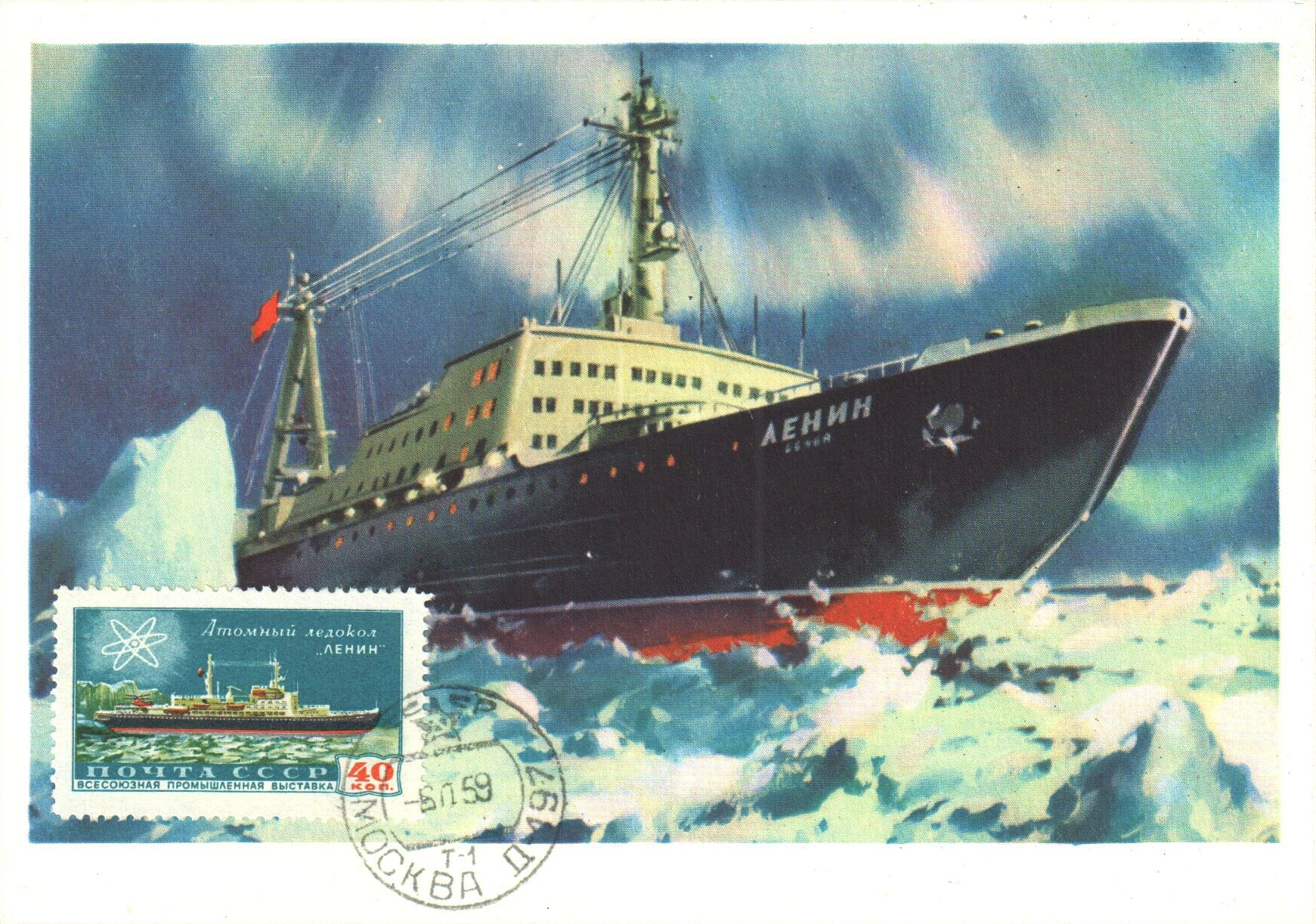
A Soviet stamp of Lenin, the world's first nuclear-powered icebreaker

Russia currently operates all existing and functioning nuclear-powered icebreakers. The first one, NS Lenin, was launched in 1957 and entered operation in 1959, before being officially decommissioned in 1989. It was both the world's first nuclear-powered surface ship and the first nuclear-powered civilian vessel.

The second Soviet nuclear icebreaker was NS Arktika, the lead ship of the Arktika class. In service since 1975, she was the first surface ship to reach the North Pole, on August 17, 1977. Several nuclear-powered icebreakers were also built outside the Soviet Union. Two shallow-draft Taymyr-class nuclear icebreakers were built in Finland for the Soviet Union in the late 1980s.

In May 2007, sea trials were completed for the nuclear-powered Russian icebreaker NS 50 Let Pobedy. The vessel was put into service by Murmansk Shipping Company, which manages all eight Russian state-owned nuclear icebreakers. The keel was originally laid in 1989 by Baltic Works of Leningrad, and the ship was launched in 1993 as NS Ural. This icebreaker is intended to be the sixth and last of the Arktika class.

Two new classes of nuclear icebreakers are planned to replace the Arktika-class ships: the Project 22220 and the Project 10510. These classes possess a larger displacement than the Arktikas'.

== Function ==
Today, most icebreakers are needed to keep trade routes open where there are either seasonal or permanent ice conditions. While the merchant vessels calling ports in these regions are strengthened for navigation in ice, they are usually not powerful enough to manage the ice by themselves. For this reason, in the Baltic Sea, the Great Lakes and the Saint Lawrence Seaway, and along the Northern Sea Route, the main function of icebreakers is to escort convoys of one or more ships safely through ice-filled waters. When a ship becomes immobilized by ice, the icebreaker has to free it by breaking the ice surrounding the ship and, if necessary, open a safe passage through the ice field. In difficult ice conditions, the icebreaker can also tow the weakest ships.

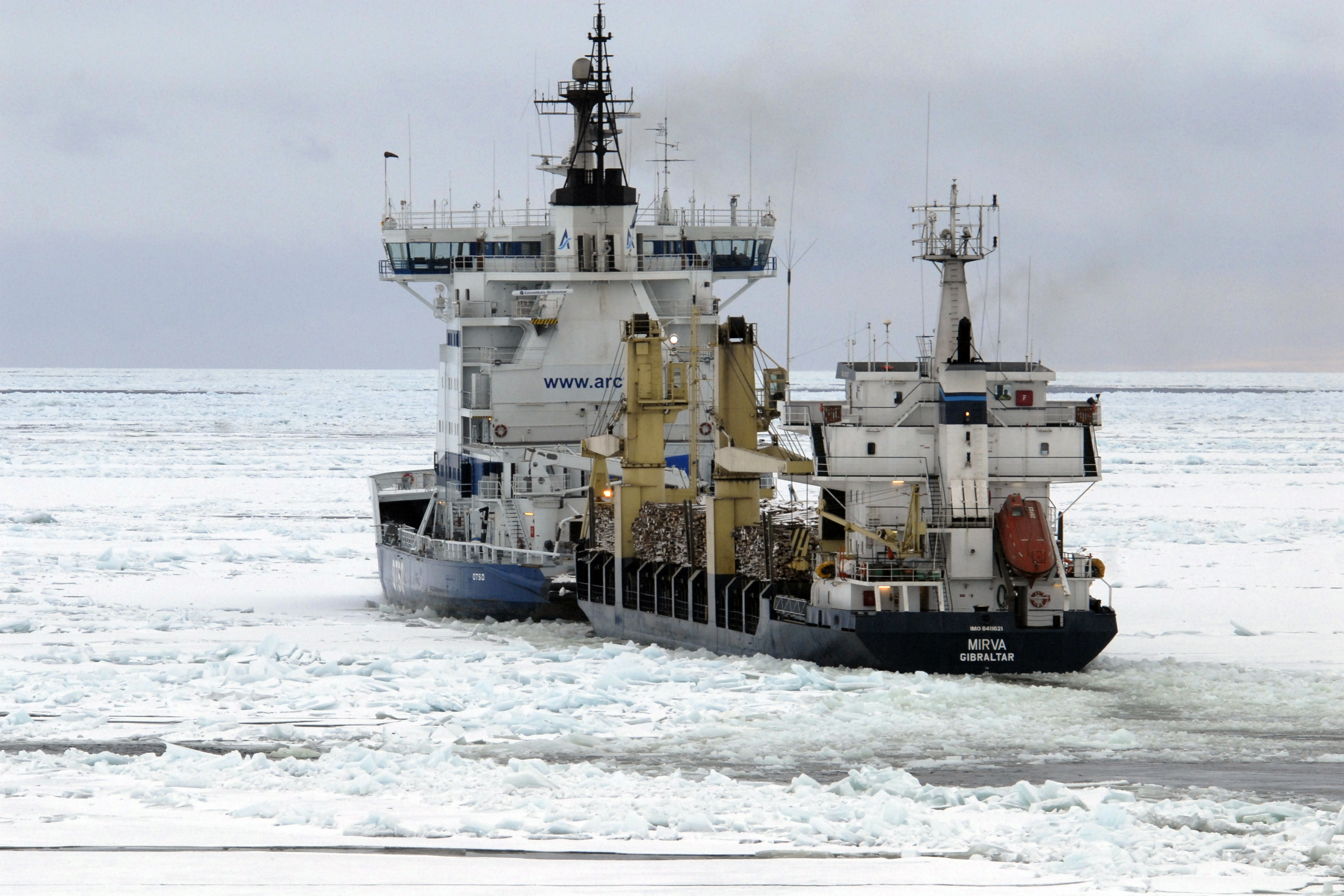
Finnish icebreaker Otso escorting a merchant ship in the Baltic Sea

Some icebreakers are also used to support scientific research in the Arctic and Antarctic. In addition to icebreaking capability, the ships need to have reasonably good open-water characteristics for transit to and from the polar regions, facilities and accommodation for the scientific personnel, and cargo capacity for supplying research stations on the shore. Countries such as Argentina and South Africa, which do not require icebreakers in domestic waters, have research icebreakers for carrying out studies in the polar regions.

As offshore drilling moves to the Arctic seas, icebreaking vessels are needed to supply cargo and equipment to the drilling sites and protect the drillships and oil platforms from ice by performing ice management, which includes for example breaking drifting ice into smaller floes and steering icebergs away from the protected object. In the past, such operations were carried out primarily in North America, but today Arctic offshore drilling and oil production is also going on in various parts of the Russian Arctic.

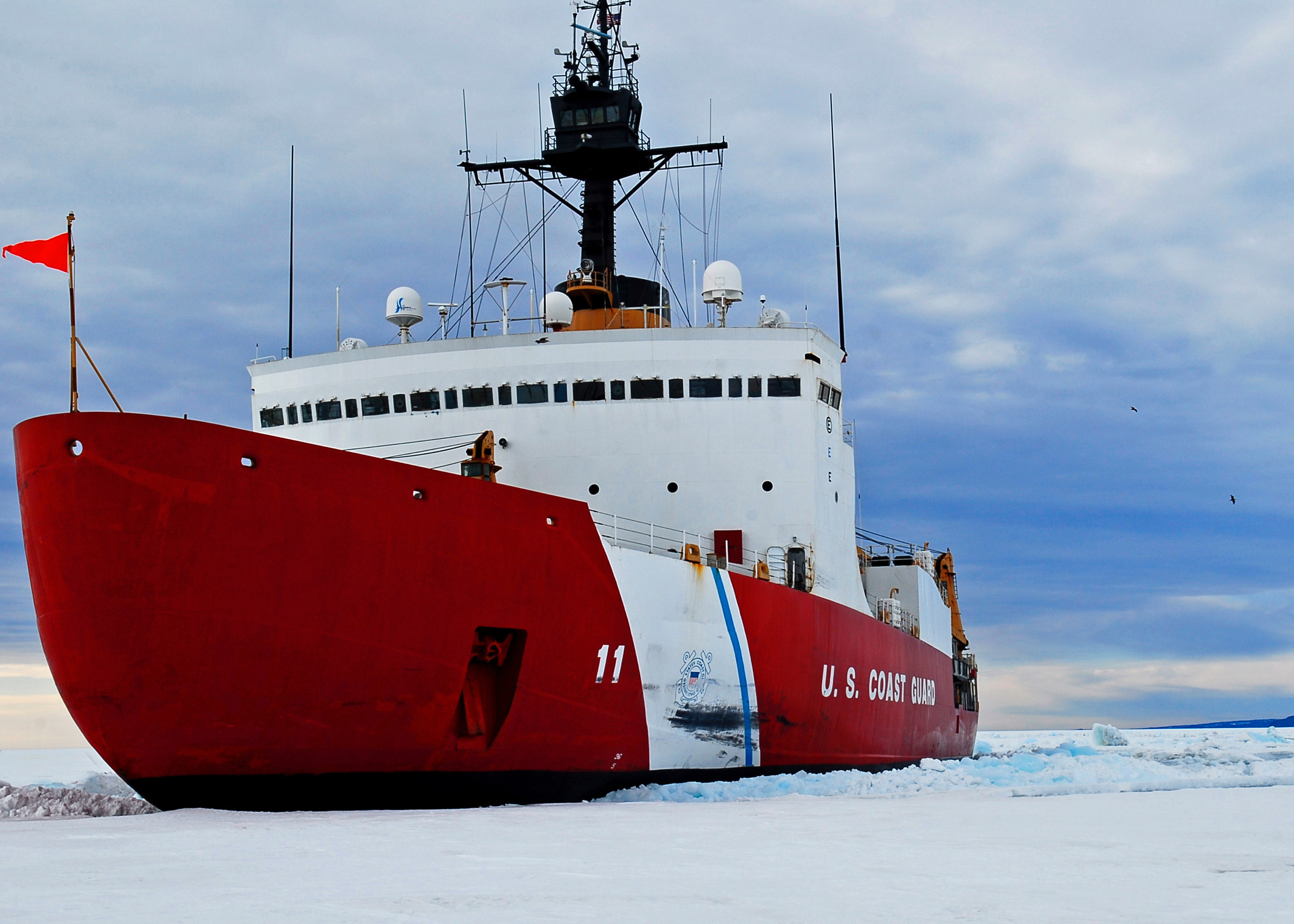
A United States Coast Guard icebreaker in McMurdo Sound in support of Operation Deep Freeze

The United States Coast Guard uses icebreakers to help conduct search and rescue missions in the icy, polar oceans. United States icebreakers serve to defend economic interests and maintain the nation's presence in the Arctic and Antarctic regions. As the icecaps in the Arctic continue to melt, there are more passageways being discovered. These possible navigation routes cause an increase of interests in the polar hemispheres from nations worldwide. The United States polar icebreakers must continue to support scientific research in the expanding Arctic and Antarctic oceans. Every year, a heavy icebreaker must perform Operation Deep Freeze, clearing a safe path for resupply ships to the National Science Foundation's facility McMurdo in Antarctica. The most recent multi-month excursion was led by the Polar Star which escorted a container and fuel ship through treacherous conditions before maintaining the channel free of ice.

== Characteristics ==
=== Ice resistance and hull form ===
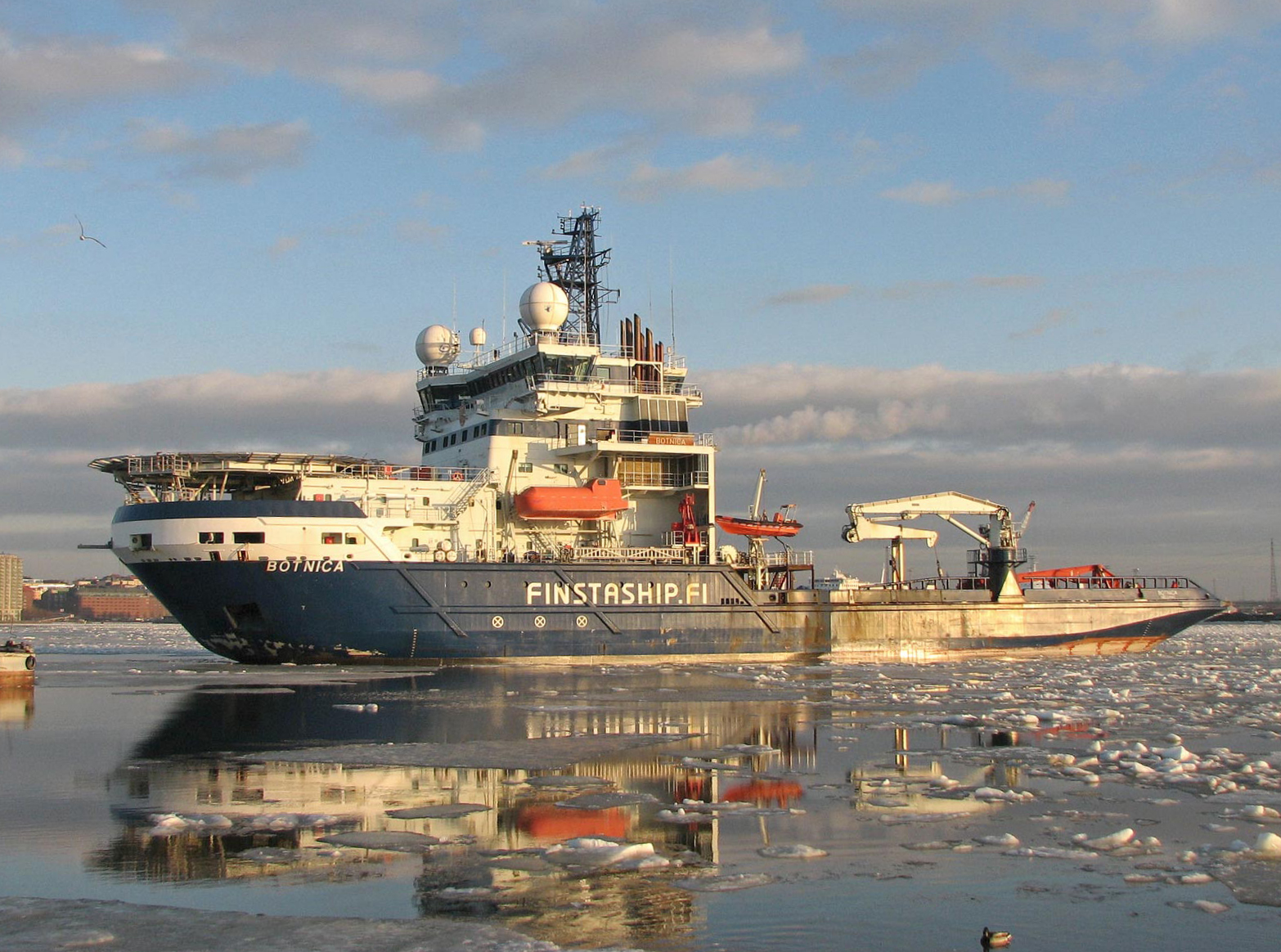
The Estonian icebreaker Botnica has a typical round icebreaker bow with small stem and flare angles. The explosion-welded ice belt and reamers are also visible.

Icebreakers are often described as ships that drive their sloping bows onto the ice and break it under the weight of the ship. In reality, this only happens in very thick ice where the icebreaker will proceed at walking pace or may even have to repeatedly back down several ship lengths and ram the ice pack at full power. More commonly the ice, which has a relatively low flexural strength, is easily broken and submerged under the hull without a noticeable change in the icebreaker's trim while the vessel moves forward at a relatively high and constant speed.

When an icebreaker is designed, one of the main goals is to minimize the forces resulting from crushing and breaking the ice, and submerging the broken floes under the vessel. The average value of the longitudinal components of these instantaneous forces is called the ship's ice resistance. Naval architects who design icebreakers use the so-called h–v curve to determine the icebreaking capability of the vessel. It shows the speed (v) that the ship is able to achieve as a function of ice thickness (h). This is done by calculating the velocity at which the thrust from the propellers equals the combined hydrodynamic and ice resistance of the vessel. An alternative means to determine the icebreaking capability of a vessel in different ice conditions, such as pressure ridges, is to perform model tests in an ice tank. Regardless of the method, the actual performance of new icebreakers is verified in full-scale ice trials once the ship has been built.

To minimize the icebreaking forces, the hull lines of an icebreaker are usually designed so that the flare at the waterline is as small as possible. As a result, icebreaking ships are characterized by a sloping or rounded stem as well as sloping sides and a short parallel midship to improve maneuverability in ice. However, the spoon-shaped bow and round hull have poor hydrodynamic efficiency and seakeeping characteristics, and make the icebreaker susceptible to slamming, or the impacting of the bottom structure of the ship onto the sea surface. For this reason, the hull of an icebreaker is often a compromise between minimum ice resistance, maneuverability in ice, low hydrodynamic resistance, and adequate open water characteristics.

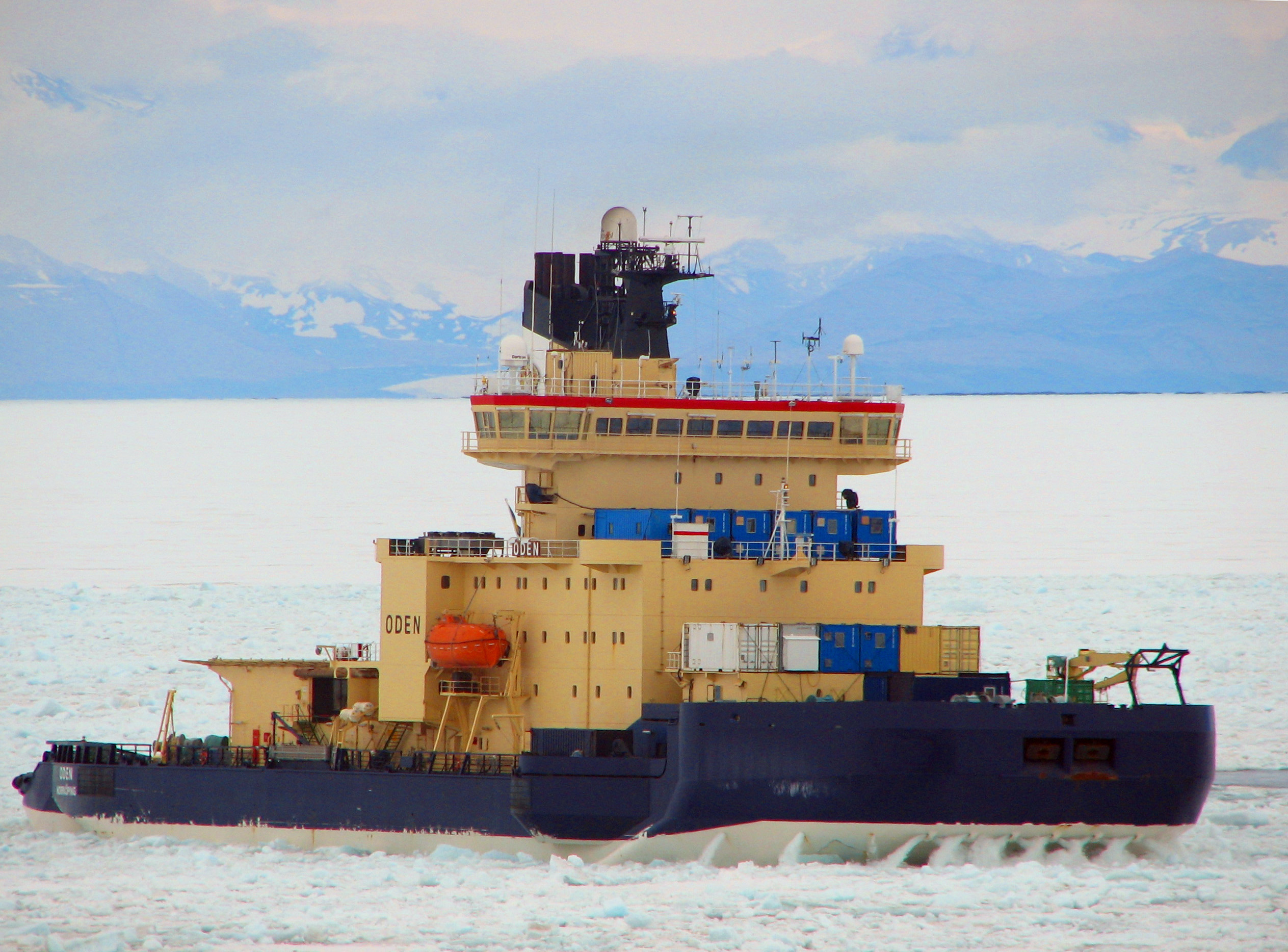
The Swedish icebreaker Oden is built with a flat bow and a water deluge system designed to reduce friction between the hull and ice.

Some icebreakers have a hull that is wider in the bow than in the stern. These reamers increase the width of the ice channel and thus reduce frictional resistance in the aftship as well as improve the ship's maneuverability in ice. In addition to low friction paint, some icebreakers use an explosion-welded abrasion-resistant stainless steel ice belt that further reduces friction and protects the ship's hull from corrosion. Auxiliary systems such as powerful water deluges and air bubbling systems are used to reduce friction by forming a lubricating layer between the hull and the ice. Pumping water between tanks on both sides of the vessel results in continuous rolling that reduces friction and makes progress through the ice easier. Experimental bow designs such as the flat Thyssen-Waas bow and a cylindrical bow have been tried over the years to further reduce the ice resistance and create an ice-free channel.

=== Structural design ===
Icebreakers and other ships operating in ice-filled waters require additional structural strengthening against various loads resulting from the contact between the hull of the vessel and the surrounding ice. As ice pressures vary between different regions of the hull, the most reinforced areas in the hull of an icegoing vessel are the bow, which experiences the highest ice loads, and around the waterline, with additional strengthening both above and below the waterline to form a continuous ice belt around the ship.

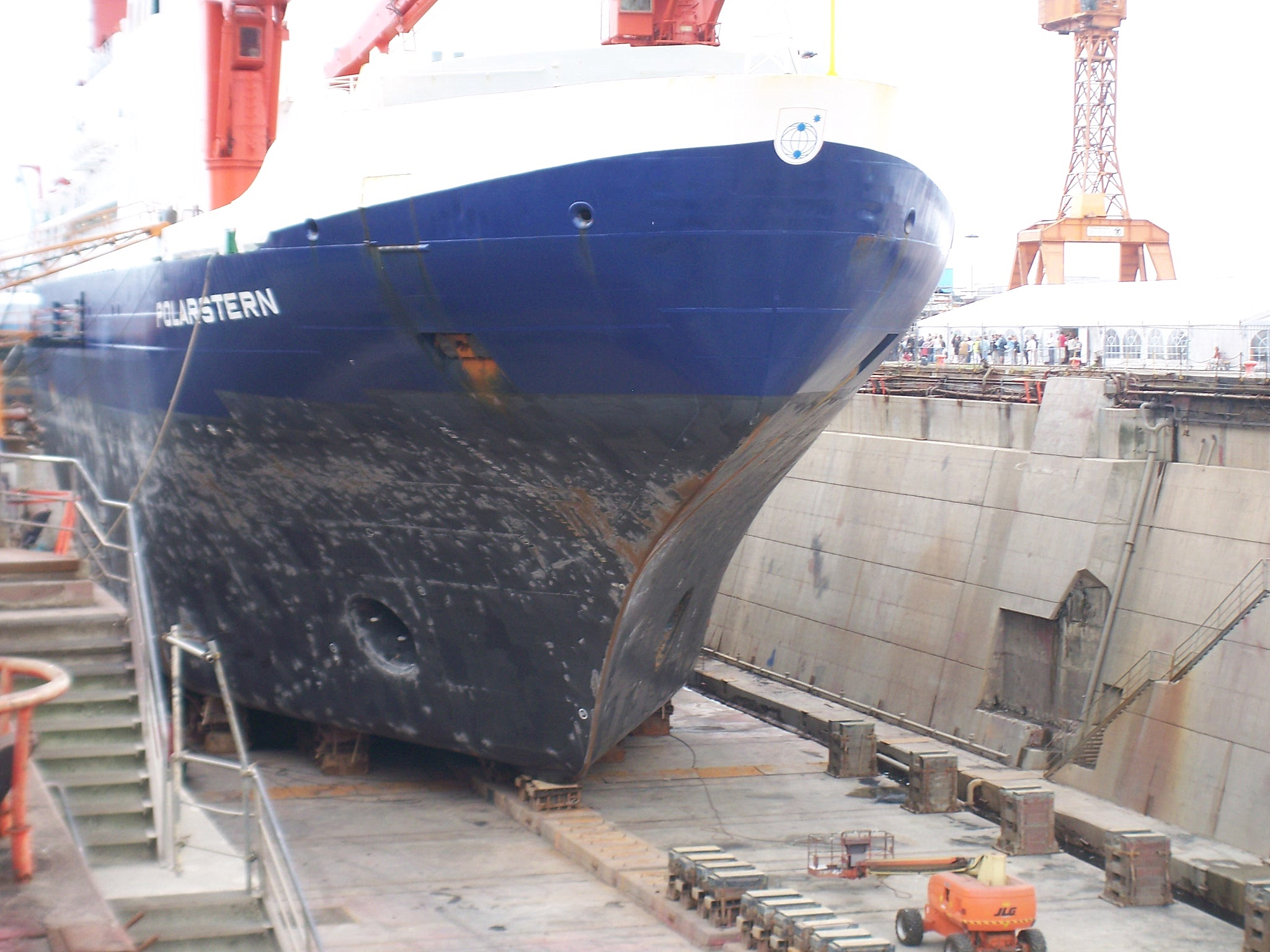
Bow of the RV Polarstern, a research icebreaker. The bow of an icebreaker is usually the most reinforced area of the ship.

Short and stubby icebreakers are generally built using transverse framing in which the shell plating is stiffened with frames placed about 400 to 1,000 millimetres (1 to 3 ft) apart as opposed to longitudinal framing used in longer ships. Near the waterline, the frames running in vertical direction distribute the locally concentrated ice loads on the shell plating to longitudinal girders called stringers, which in turn are supported by web frames and bulkheads that carry the more spread-out hull loads. While the shell plating, which is in direct contact with the ice, can be up to 50 millimetres (2.0 in) thick in older polar icebreakers, the use of high strength steel with yield strength up to 500 MPa (73,000 psi) in modern icebreakers results in the same structural strength with smaller material thicknesses and lower steel weight. Regardless of the strength, the steel used in the hull structures of an icebreaker must be capable of resisting brittle fracture in low ambient temperatures and high loading conditions, both of which are typical for operations in ice-filled waters.

If built according to the rules set by a classification society such as American Bureau of Shipping, Det Norske Veritas or Lloyd's Register, icebreakers may be assigned an ice class based on the level of ice strengthening in the ship's hull. It is usually determined by the maximum ice thickness where the ship is expected to operate and other requirements such as possible limitations on ramming. While the ice class is generally an indication of the level of ice strengthening, not the actual icebreaking capability of an icebreaker, some classification societies such as the Russian Maritime Register of Shipping have operational capability requirements for certain ice classes. Since the 2000s, International Association of Classification Societies (IACS) has proposed adopting an unified system known as the Polar Class (PC) to replace classification society specific ice class notations.

=== Power and propulsion ===
Since the Second World War, most icebreakers have been built with diesel–electric propulsion in which diesel engines coupled to generators produce electricity for propulsion motors that turn the fixed pitch propellers. The first diesel–electric icebreakers were built with direct current (DC) generators and propulsion motors, but over the years the technology advanced first to alternating current (AC) generators and finally to frequency-controlled AC-AC systems. In modern diesel–electric icebreakers, the propulsion system is built according to the power plant principle in which the main generators supply electricity for all onboard consumers and no auxiliary engines are needed.

Although the diesel–electric powertrain is the preferred choice for icebreakers due to the good low-speed torque characteristics of the electric propulsion motors, icebreakers have also been built with diesel engines mechanically coupled to reduction gearboxes and controllable pitch propellers. The mechanical powertrain has several advantages over diesel–electric propulsion systems, such as lower weight and better fuel efficiency. However, diesel engines are sensitive to sudden changes in propeller revolutions, and to counter this mechanical powertrains are usually fitted with large flywheels or hydrodynamic couplings to absorb the torque variations resulting from propeller-ice interaction.

The 1969-built Canadian polar icebreaker CCGS Louis S. St-Laurent was one of the few icebreakers fitted with steam boilers and turbogenerators that produced power for three electric propulsion motors. It was later refitted with five diesel engines, which provide better fuel economy than steam turbines. Later Canadian icebreakers were built with diesel–electric powertrain.

Two Polar-class icebreakers operated by the United States Coast Guard, have a combined diesel–electric and mechanical propulsion system that consists of six diesel engines and three gas turbines. While the diesel engines are coupled to generators that produce power for three propulsion motors, the gas turbines are directly coupled to the propeller shafts driving controllable pitch propellers. The diesel–electric power plant can produce up to 13,000 kW (18,000 hp) while the gas turbines have a continuous combined rating of 45,000 kW (60,000 hp).

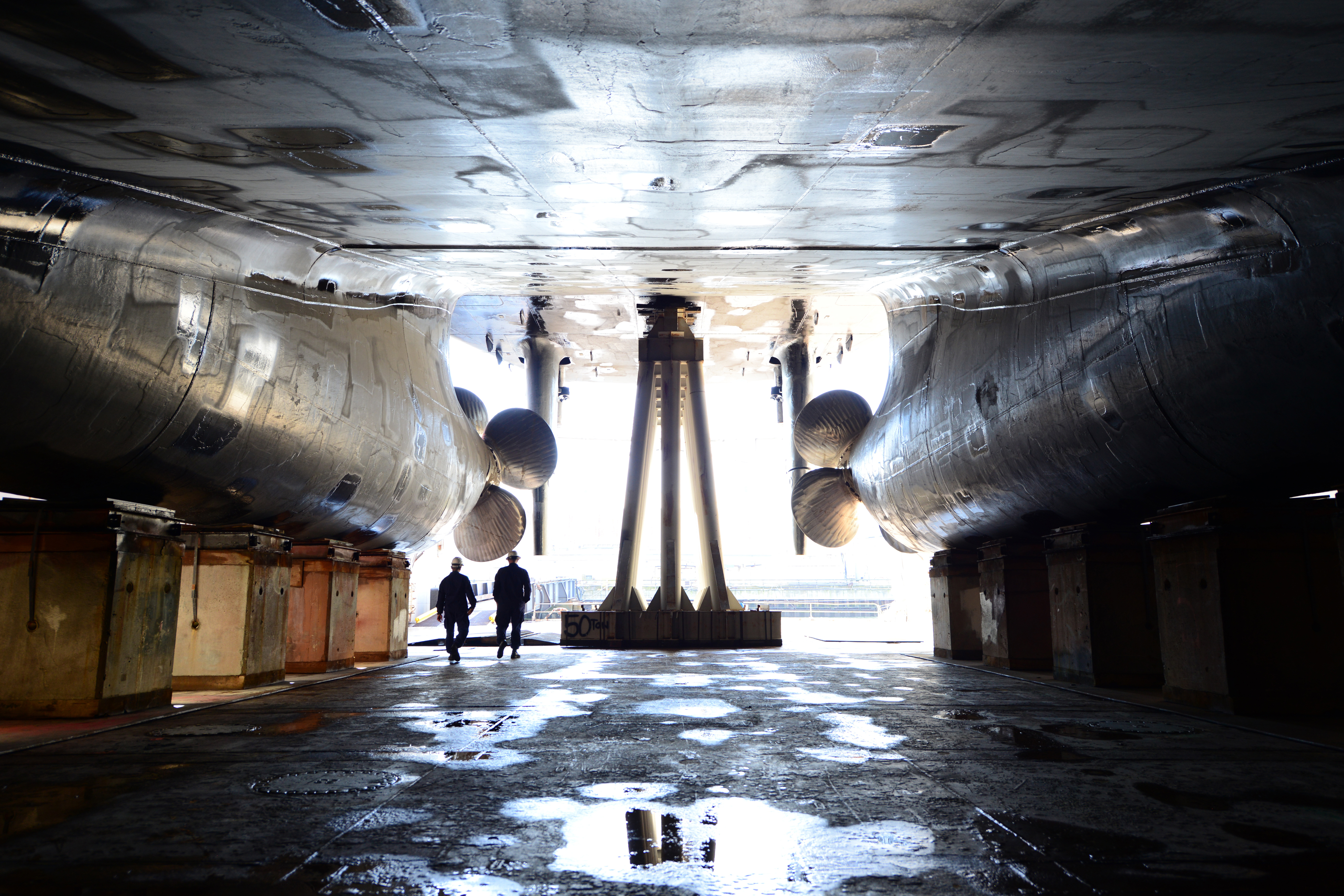
View of the underside of USCGC Healy hull and propellers

The number, type and location of the propellers depends on the power, draft and intended purpose of the vessel. Smaller icebreakers and icebreaking special purpose ships may be able to do with just one propeller while large polar icebreakers typically need up to three large propellers to absorb all power and deliver enough thrust. Some shallow draught river icebreakers have been built with four propellers in the stern. Nozzles may be used to increase the thrust at lower speeds, but they may become clogged by ice. Until the 1980s, icebreakers operating regularly in ridged ice fields in the Baltic Sea were fitted with first one and later two bow propellers to create a powerful flush along the hull of the vessel. This considerably increased the icebreaking capability of the vessels by reducing the friction between the hull and the ice, and allowed the icebreakers to penetrate thick ice ridges without ramming. However, the bow propellers are not suitable for polar icebreakers operating in the presence of harder multi-year ice and thus have not been used in the Arctic.

Azimuth thrusters remove the need of traditional propellers and rudders by having the propellers in steerable gondolas that can rotate 360 degrees around a vertical axis. These thrusters improve propulsion efficiency, icebreaking capability and maneuverability of the vessel. The use of azimuth thrusters also allows a ship to move astern in ice without losing manoeuvrability. This has led to the development of double acting ships, vessels with the stern shaped like an icebreaker's bow and the bow designed for open water performance. In this way, the ship remains economical to operate in open water without compromising its ability to operate in difficult ice conditions. Azimuth thrusters have also made it possible to develop new experimental icebreakers that operate sideways to open a wide channel through ice.

==== Nuclear-powered ====
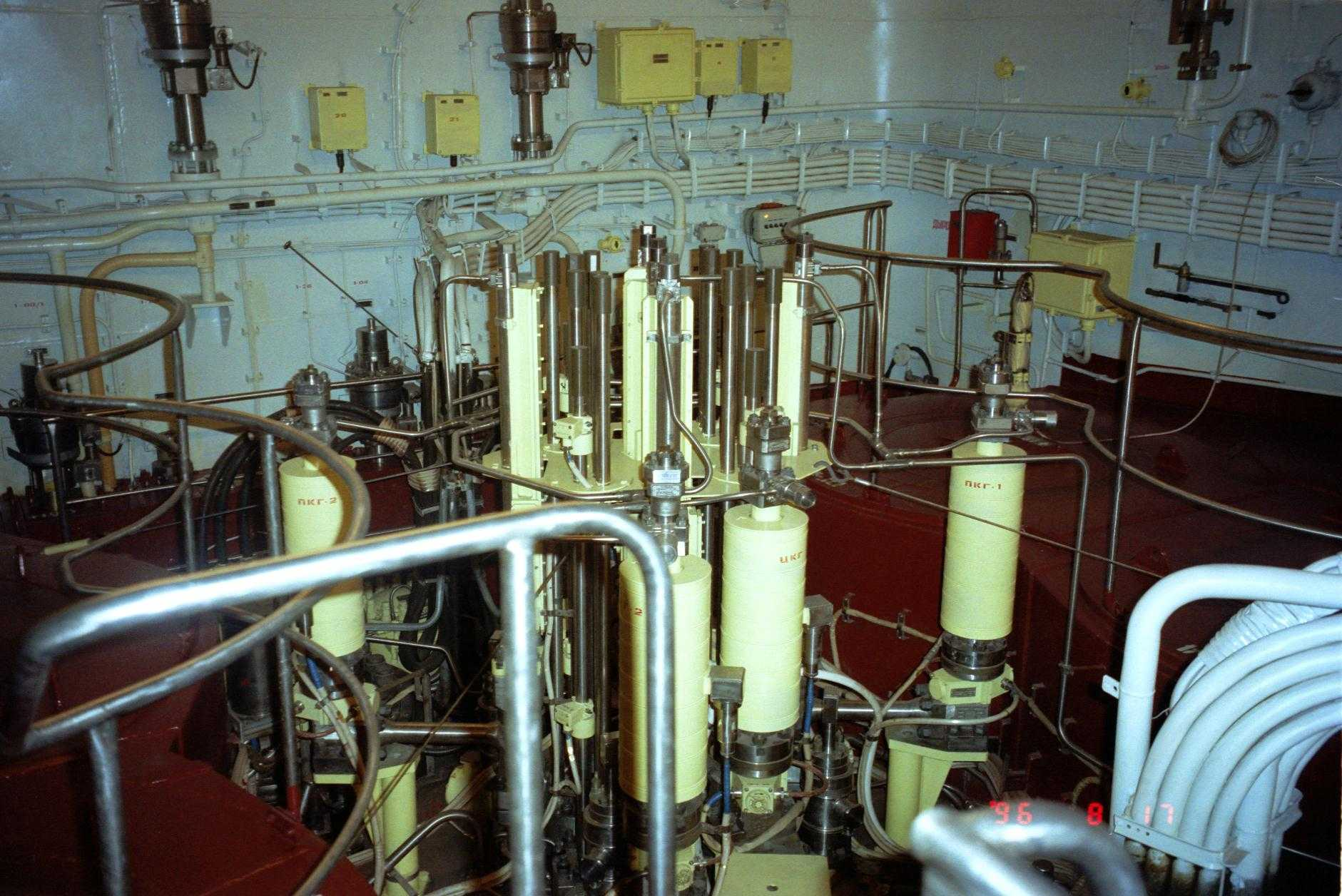
Reactor head for the Yamal, a nuclear-powered icebreaker

The steam-powered icebreakers were resurrected in the late 1950s when the Soviet Union commissioned the first nuclear-powered icebreaker, Lenin, in 1959. It had a nuclear–turbo–electric powertrain in which the nuclear reactor was used to produce steam for turbogenerators, which in turn produced electricity for propulsion motors. Starting from 1975, the Russians commissioned six Arktika-class nuclear icebreakers. Soviets also built a nuclear-powered icebreaking cargo ship, Sevmorput, which had a single nuclear reactor and a steam turbine directly coupled to the propeller shaft. Russia, which remains the sole operator of nuclear-powered icebreakers, is currently building Project 22220 60,000 kW (80,000 hp) icebreakers to replace the aging Arktika class. The first vessel of this type entered service in 2020.

== See also ==
- List of icebreakers
- List of auxiliaries of the United States Navy § Icebreakers (AGB)
- Resonance method of ice destruction that can be used by hovercraft
