= Rauma shipyard =

Coordinates: 61.12347°N 21.46162°E

Rauma shipyard (Finnish: Rauman telakka) is a shipyard in Rauma, Finland. It was previously operated by STX Finland which is owned by the South Korean STX Corporation. Rauma shipyard is specialized in large ferries, small cruise ships, multipurpose icebreakers and small naval craft.

As of 2020, Rauma Marine Constructions operates the Rauma shipyard.

== History ==
Shipbuilding in Rauma had begun in the 16th century and continued until the end of the sail ship era in the 1890s. Modern shipbuilding was launched in 1945 as F.W. Hollming and Rauma-Repola started building ships for Soviet Union as war reparations. In 1991 they merged and were known as Finnyards which was later owned by the Norwegian Aker Maritime. Since 2008 the shipyard was operated by STX Finland.

In September 2013 STX Finland announced of closing the Rauma shipyard and 600 workers were laid off. In January 2014 the shipyard was purchased by the City of Rauma with a price of 18 million euros. The shipyard area is planned to be developed as an industrial park for companies operating in the marine industry. The British marine engine manufacturer Rolls-Royce has expressed its intention to expand its Rauma operations to the dockyard site.

The construction of the Finnish Navy's four new Pohjanmaa-class corvettes is scheduled to begin in the shipyard in 2019.

== Selected ships built at Rauma shipyard ==
=== Civilian ships ===
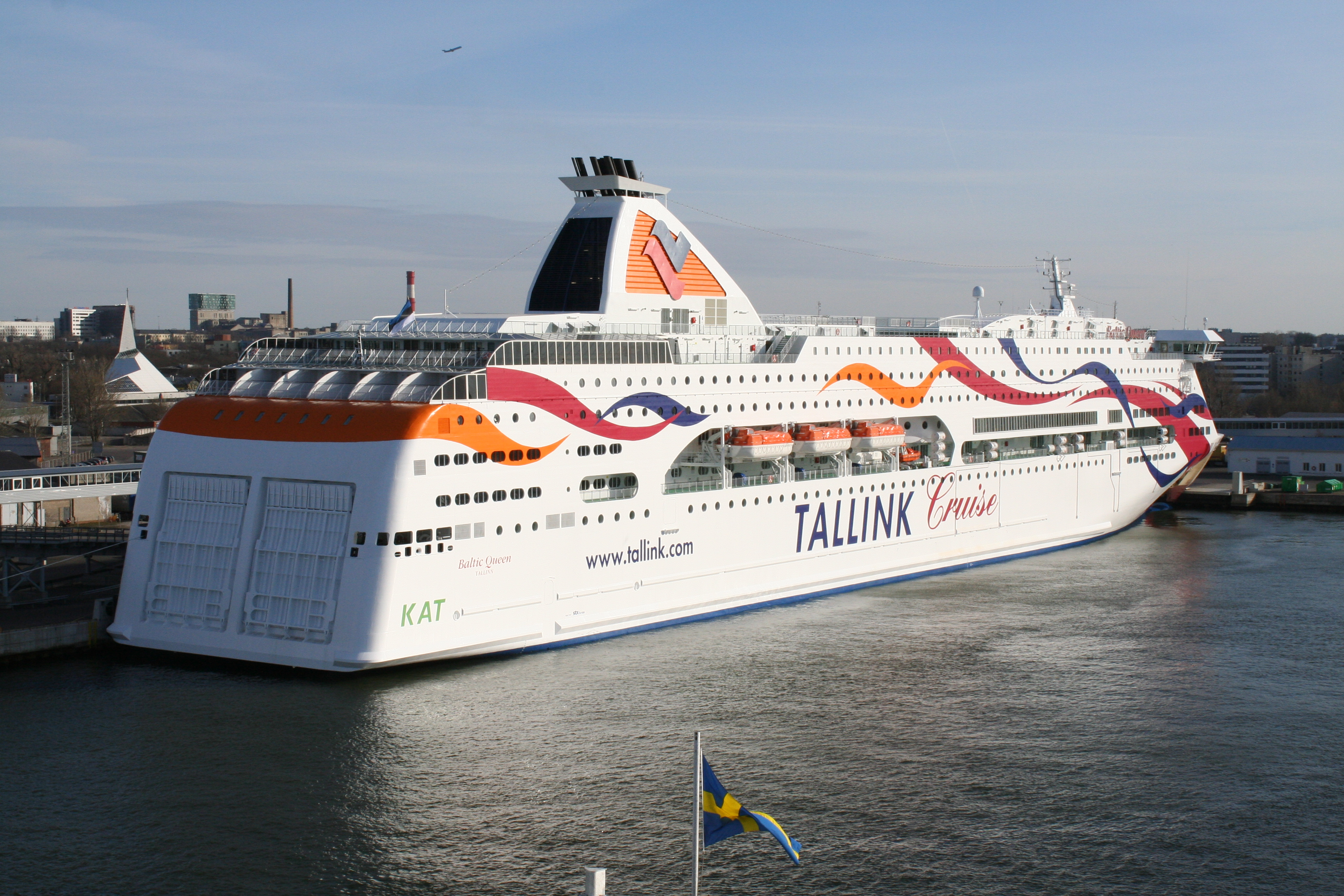
MS Baltic Queen (2009)

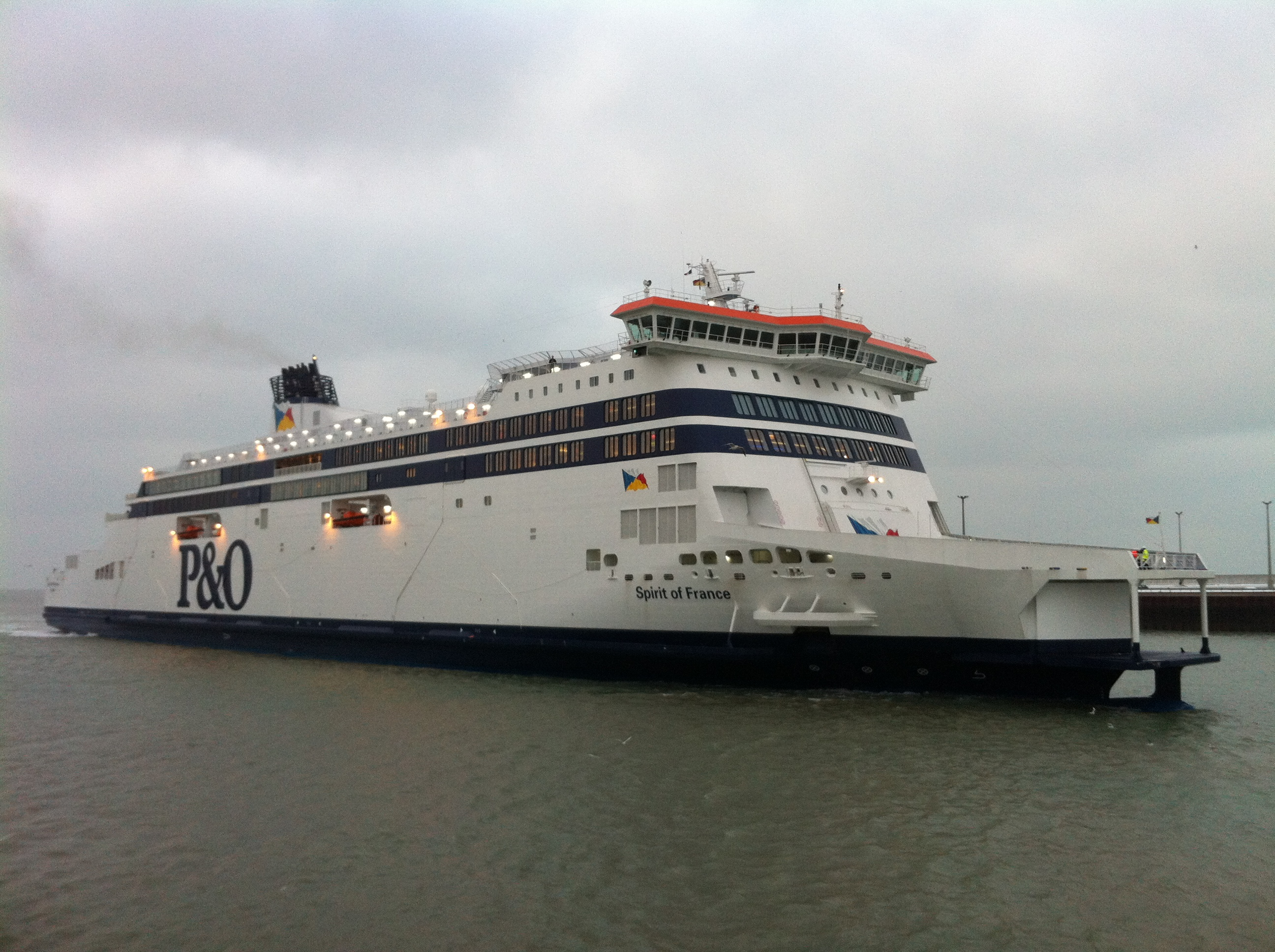
MS Spirit of France (2012)

- Akademik Mstislav Keldysh (1981)
- Akademik Sergey Vavilov (1988)
- Akademik Ioffe (1989)
- Silver Explorer (1989)
- KBV 181, Swedish Coast Guard Patrol Vessel (1990)
- MSV Fennica (1993)
- MSV Nordica (1994)
- MSV Botnica (1998)
- MS Ulysses (2001)
- MV Hjaltland (2002)
- MV Hrossey (2002)
- MV Hamnavoe (2002)
- MS Romantika (2002)
- MS Birka Stockholm (2004)
- MS Victoria I (2004)
- MS Galaxy (2006)
- MS Color Magic (2007)
- MS Superspeed 1 (2008)
- MS Baltic Queen (2009)
- MS Spirit of Britain (2009)
- MS Spirit of France (2012)
- S. A. Agulhas II (2012)
- RV Mirabilis (2012)
- Turva (2014)
- MV Hammershus (2018)
- Aurora Botnia (2021)
- MyStar (2022)
- Spirit of Tasmania IV (2024)
- Spirit of Tasmania V (2025)

=== Warships ===
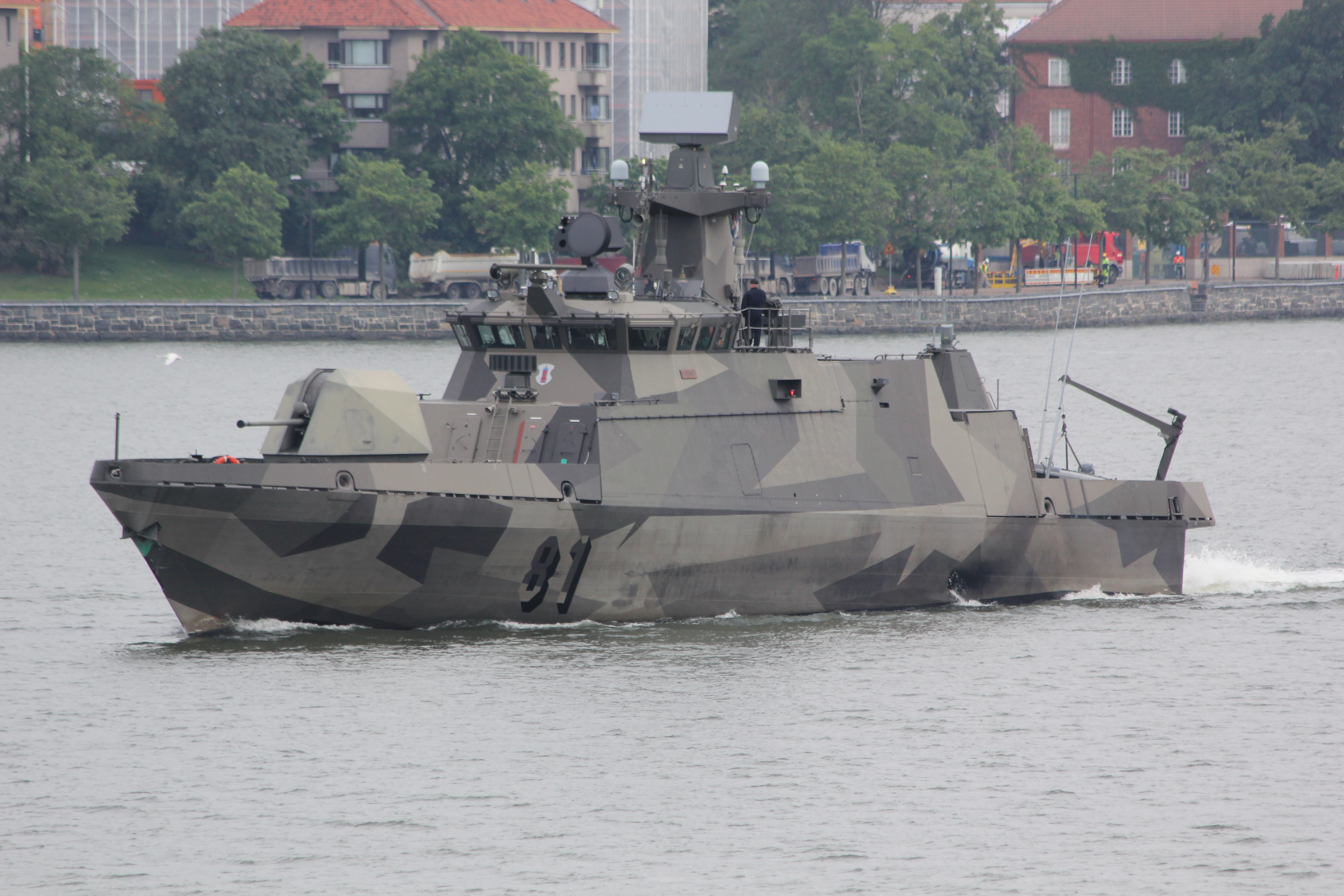
FNS Tornio (2003)

- Valas-class auxiliary transport vessels (1979–1981)
  - FNS Vahakari (1979)
  - FNS Valas (1980)
  - FNS Vaarlahti (1980)
  - FNS Vänö (1981)
- Kiisla-class patrol boats (1984–1988)
  - FNS Kiisla (1984)
  - FNS Kurki (1988)
- FNS Halli (1987)
- Rauma-class missile boats (1990–1992)
  - FNS Rauma (1990)
  - FNS Raahe (1991)
  - FNS Porvoo (1992)
  - FNS Naantali (1992)
- Hämeenmaa-class minelayers (1991–1992)
  - FNS Hämeenmaa (1991)
  - FNS Uusimaa (1992)
- Hamina-class missile boats (1996–2006)
  - FNS Hamina (1998)
  - FNS Tornio (2003)
  - FNS Hanko (2005)
  - FNS Pori (2006)
- FNS Tuuli (2003)
- Pohjanmaa-class corvettes (2023–)
