= Arctic Security Cutter program =

United States Coast Guard program

Class overview
- Builders: Rauma Marine Constructions (Finland); Bollinger Shipyards (United States); Helsinki Shipyard (Finland); Davie Defense (United States)
- Operators: United States Coast Guard
- Preceded by: Polar Security Cutter program
- Succeeded by: Homeland Security Cutter program
- In service: 2028– (planned)
- Planned: 11
- On order: 6 (first series); 5 (second series)
- Building: 3

General characteristics (first series)
- Displacement: 8,900 long tons (9,000 t)
- Length: 328 ft (100 m)
- Beam: 67 ft (20 m)
- Draft: 21 ft (6.4 m)
- Ice class: Polar Class 4
- Installed power: 10,100 kW (13,500 hp)
- Propulsion: Diesel-electric; 7,200 kW (9,700 hp)
- Speed: 3 knots (5.6 km/h; 3.5 mph) in 4 ft (1.2 m) ice
- Range: 12,000 nautical miles (22,000 km; 14,000 mi)

General characteristics (second series)
- Displacement: 8,900 long tons (9,000 t)
- Length: 328 ft (99.9 m)
- Beam: 69 ft (21 m)
- Draft: 23 ft (7 m)
- Ice class: Polar Class 3
- Installed power: 21,000 kW (28,000 hp)
- Propulsion: Diesel-electric; 13,000 kW (17,000 hp)
- Speed: 16 knots (30 km/h; 18 mph) (maximum); 3 knots (5.6 km/h; 3.5 mph) in 4.9 ft (1.5 m) ice
- Range: Over 12,000 nautical miles (22,000 km; 14,000 mi) (maximum); 6,500 nautical miles (12,000 km; 7,500 mi) at 12 knots (22 km/h; 14 mph)

The Arctic Security Cutter (ASC) program is an ongoing program to recapitalize the United States Coast Guard's ageing fleet of polar icebreakers with the construction of up to 11 new icebreakers in Finland and the United States.

== Project timeline ==
In 2007, the Transportation Research Board and National Research Council report Polar Icebreakers in a Changing World: An Assessment of U.S. Needs concluded that meeting the future polar icebreaking needs of the United States would require a minimum of three multi-mission and one single-mission icebreakers. At the time, the United States had two heavy icebreakers (USCGC Polar Star and USCGC Polar Sea) and one medium icebreaker (USCGC Healy) operated by the United States Coast Guard, and one dedicated icebreaking research vessel operated by the National Science Foundation (Nathaniel B. Palmer). The heavy icebreakers were identified as being at the end of their service life and USCGC Polar Star had been placed in caretaker status.

The 2010 High Latitude Mission Analysis Report further iterated that the United States Coast Guard would require three heavy and three medium icebreakers to perform its statutory missions in the polar regions. (Note: In U.S. parlance, "heavy icebreakers" are icebreakers capable of breaking ice up to 6 feet (1.8 m) while "medium icebreakers" can break 4.5-foot (1.4 m) ice.) In the same year, USCGC Polar Sea became inoperable following an unexpected engine casualty, leaving the service without an operational heavy icebreaker and forcing it to charter foreign vessels for Operation Deep Freeze until USCGC Polar Star returned to service following a refit in 2013.

In 2012, the United States Coast Guard launched an acquisition program for heavy polar icebreakers that, in 2018, were renamed Polar Security Cutters (PSC). The detail design and construction of the lead ship was awarded to the Mississippi-based VT Halter Marine on 23 April 2019 with delivery originally planned in 2024. As of 2026, the program has been severely delayed with the first vessel, USCGC Polar Sentinel, now expected to be delivered no earlier than 2030. As a stopgap measure, the United States Coast Guard acquired the commercial icebreaking anchor handling tug supply (AHTS) vessel Aiviq and commissioned it as the medium icebreaker USCGC Storis in August 2025.

With the procurement of the Polar Security Cutters underway, the focus shifted to medium icebreakers that, at least since 2020, had been tentatively referred to as Arctic Security Cutters (ASC). The 2023 Coast Guard Fleet Mix Analysis increased the size of the fleet required to carry out the United States Coast Guard's Arctic and Antarctic missions in the coming years from earlier six to a total of eight to nine vessels, including four to five heavy and four to five medium icebreakers.

On 11 July 2024, the United States formed the Icebreaker Collaboration Effort (ICE Pact) with Finland and Canada to collaborate on the development and construction of polar icebreakers. However, despite the trilateral partnership, the potential construction of icebreakers for the United States Coast Guard in foreign shipyards would still require presidential waivers to two laws explicitly forbidding this, Title 14 U.S. Code §1151 and Title 10 U.S. Code §8679. (Note: The Jones Act (Section 27 of the Merchant Marine Act of 1920) applies to commercial vessels carrying "merchandise" between two U.S. ports and is thus not applicable to United States Coast Guard vessels or to vessels engaged in icebreaking operations.)

On 11 April 2025, the United States Coast Guard released a Request for Information (RFI) as part of a market research to assess the capabilities of domestic and foreign shipbuilding industries to support the procurement of Arctic Security Cutters with particular focus on production-ready vessel designs that could be launched within 36 months of contract award. In response to this, three Canadian shipbuilders displayed their candidate designs for the Arctic Security Cutter in the CANSEC 2025 defence and security trade show in May: Irving Shipbuilding the Arctic and Offshore Patrol Vessel (AOPS) already being built for the Royal Canadian Navy and the Canadian Coast Guard, Seaspan Vancouver Shipyards the Multi-Purpose Icebreaker (MPI) design developed for the Canadian Coast Guard, and Davie Shipbuilding a new Multi-Purpose Polar Support Ship (MPPS) based on the series of icebreaking offshore vessels built by Helsinki Shipyard in Finland.

In June 2025, the Davie Shipbuilding announced its plans to acquire Gulf Copper & Manufacturing Corporation's shipbuilding facilities in Port Arthur and Galveston, Texas, and transform them to shipyards that could build Arctic Security Cutters in the United States. This announcement followed the company's previous statement, issued in the wake of signing the ICE Pact, that Davie intended to create a permanent shipbuilding presence in the United States.

On 3 July 2025, the 119th United States Congress passed and, on the following day, President Donald Trump signed into the law the One Big Beautiful Bill Act which included a major recapitalization of the United States Coast Guard icebreaker fleet. The $25 billion total investment includes nearly $9 billion funding for an estimated 17 new icebreakers including Polar Security Cutters and Arctic Security Cutters as well as light and medium domestic icebreakers.

On 29 July 2025, the Mississippi-based Bollinger Shipyards, the Finnish shipbuilder Rauma Marine Constructions, and the Canadian Seaspan Vancouver Shipyards announced a strategic trilateral international partnership to offer the Multi-Purpose Icebreaker design originally developed for the Canadian Coast Guard as the future Arctic Security Cutter for the United States. The production-ready design, developed by Seaspan together with the Finnish icebreaker designer Aker Arctic, would be offered with delivery of first vessel within 36 months of contract award and with gradual transition of production to American shipyards.

On 8 October 2025, President Trump issued a memorandum enabling the United States Coast Guard to contract the construction of up to four Arctic Security Cutters to foreign shipyards in the interest of national security interest of the United States. On the following day, President Alexander Stubb and Prime Minister Petteri Orpo signed a memorandum of understanding on icebreaker collaboration during a working visit to the White House. The construction of four of the eleven planned Arctic Security Cutters in Finland was confirmed on the following day.

On 29 December 2025, the United States Coast Guard awarded the construction of up to six Arctic Security Cutters to two shipyards. The first two icebreakers would be built by the Finnish shipbuilder Rauma Marine Constructions in Finland and the following four by Bollinger Shipyards in the United States with deliveries starting in 2028 and 2029, respectively. The $1.1 billion and $2.2 billion contracts were finalized on 2 July 2026. On the same day, it was also reported that Bollinger Shipyards had begun steel cutting already in April ahead of final contract award. On 4 August 2026, the CEO of Rauma Marine Constructions implied in an interview that production had also started in Finland. In September 2026, Rauma Marine Constructions reported that nearly half of the blocks of the first vessel were already in production and the construction of the second vessel would begin soon.

On 11 February 2026, the construction of the remaining five Arctic Security Cutters was awarded to Davie Defense, the U.S. subsidiary of the Canadian shipbuilder Davie Shipbuilding, who would build two vessels at Helsinki Shipyard in Finland and three at the company's recently-acquired shipbuilding facilities in Texas. The first vessel built under the $3.5 billion contract is scheduled to be delivered in 2028 and all five by February 2035. The construction of the first vessel began on 23 June 2026.

In April 2026, the United States Coast Guard announced that the first two Arctic Security Cutters would be homeported in Alaska.

== Design ==
=== First series ===
3D rendering of the future Arctic Security Cutters built by Rauma Marine Constructions and Bollinger Shipyards.

The six Arctic Security Cutters contracted to Rauma Marine Constructions and Bollinger Shipyards will be based on the Multi-Purpose Icebreaker design originally developed for the Canadian Coast Guard.

The 8,900-long-ton (9,000 t) vessels will be 328 feet (100 m) long overall and have a beam of 67 feet (20 m) and draft of 21 feet (6.4 m). Their hulls will be strengthened to Polar Class 4 in accordance with Lloyd's Register requirements. The vessels will feature diesel-electric power plants with an installed power of 10,100 kilowatts (13,500 hp) and propulsion power of 7,200 kilowatts (9,700 hp), giving them capability to break 3.3-foot (1 m) ice at a continuous speed of 4 knots (7.4 km/h; 4.6 mph). They will have a range of 12,000 nautical miles (22,000 km; 14,000 mi).

=== Second series ===
3D rendering of the future Arctic Security Cutters built by Davie Defense.

The five Arctic Security Cutters contracted to Davie Defense will be based on the Multi-Purpose Polar Support Ship (MPPS-100) design developed by Helsinki Shipyard based on a series of icebreaking offshore vessels.

The Polar Class 3 vessels, displacing about 8,900 long tons (9,000 t) at a normal operating draft of 23 feet (7 m), will be 328 feet (99.9 m) long and have a beam of 69 feet (21 m). The diesel-electric power plants will have an installed power of 21,000 kilowatts (28,000 hp) and the vessels will be propelled by two 6,500-kilowatt (8,700 hp) azimuth thrusters giving them a maximum speed of 16 knots (30 km/h; 18 mph) in open water and 3 knots (5.6 km/h; 3.5 mph) in 4.9-foot (1.5 m) ice. Their operational range will be over 12,000 nautical miles (22,000 km; 14,000 mi) in high endurance deep-draft configuration and 6,500 nautical miles (12,000 km; 7,500 mi) at 12 knots (22 km/h; 14 mph) in normal operating mode.

== Ships in class ==
=== First series ===
Name	Hull Number	IMO number	Builder	Laid down	Launched	Delivered	Commissioned	Homeport	Status
		1158579	Rauma Marine Constructions (Finland)			2028 (planned)			Under construction
		1158581	Rauma Marine Constructions (Finland)			2028 (planned)			Ordered
			Bollinger Shipyards (United States)			2029 (planned)			Under construction
			Bollinger Shipyards (United States)						Ordered
			Bollinger Shipyards (United States)						Ordered
			Bollinger Shipyards (United States)						Ordered

=== Second series ===
Name	Hull Number	IMO number	Builder	Laid down	Launched	Delivered	Commissioned	Homeport	Status
		4777285	Helsinki Shipyard (Finland)			2028 (planned)			Under construction
		4777297	Helsinki Shipyard (Finland)			2029 (planned)			Ordered
		4777302	Davie Defense (United States)			2030 (planned)			Ordered
		4777314	Davie Defense (United States)			2033 (planned)			Ordered
		4777326	Davie Defense (United States)			2035 (planned)			Ordered
