= STX Finland =

Finnish shipbuilding company

Meyer Turku Oy
- Formerly: Aker Yards
- Type: osakeyhtiö
- Industry: shipbuilding
- Predecessor: Wärtsilä Marine
- Founded: 7 November 1989 as Masa-Yards Turku New Shipyard
- Founders: Finnish state Martin Saarikangas; Ted Arison
- Defunct: 2014
- Fate: sold in 2014 to Meyer Werft, USC and state of Finland
- Successors: Meyer Turku; Aker Arctic; Arctech Helsinki Shipyard; Rauma Marine Constructions
- Headquarters: Perno, Turku, Finland
- Products: cruise ships, cruiseferries, arctic vessels
- Parent: Meyer Werft

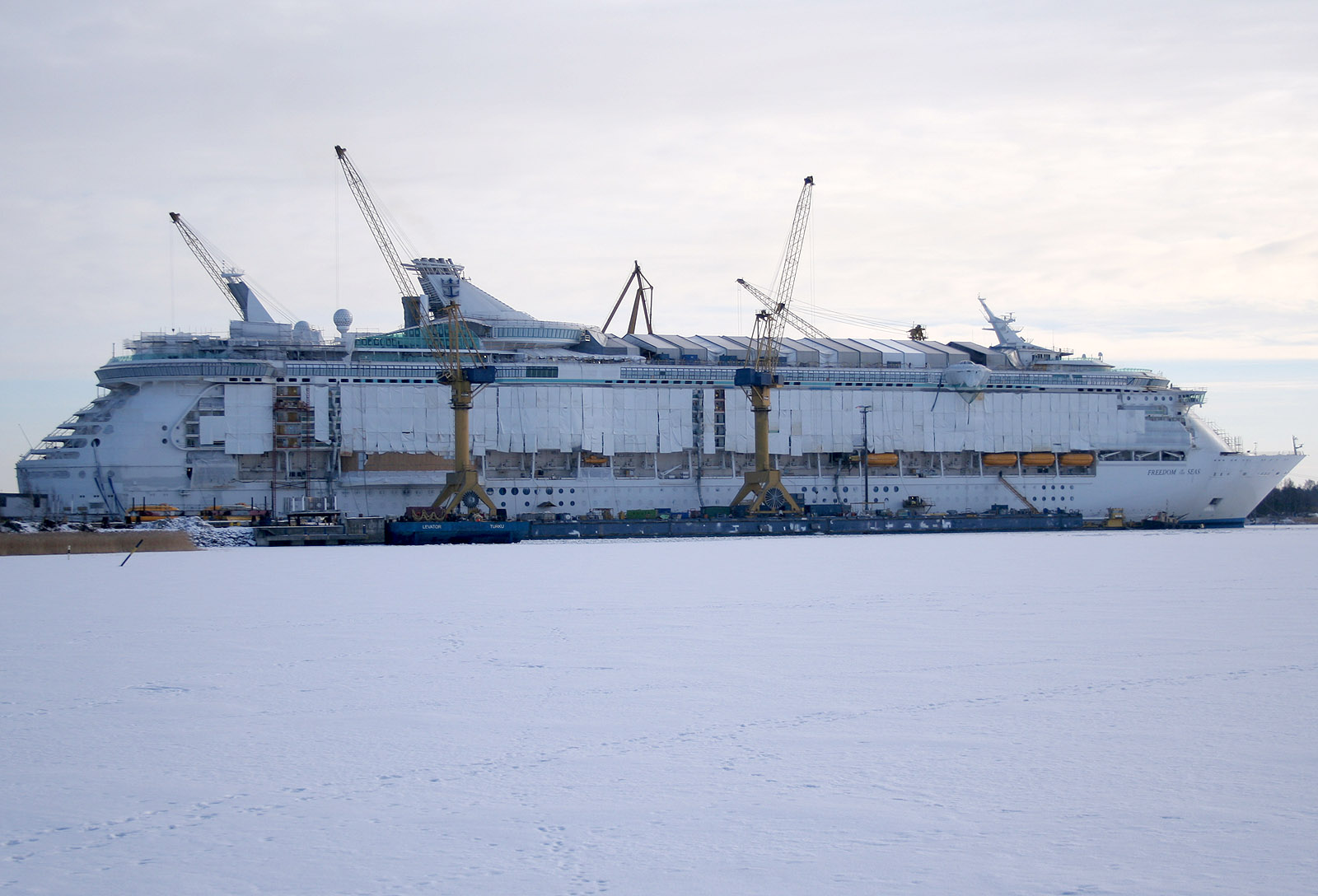
MS Freedom of the Seas under construction at Aker Yards in Turku in 2006

STX Finland Oy, formerly Aker Yards Oy, was a Finnish shipbuilding company operating three shipyards in Finland, in Turku, Helsinki and Rauma, employing some 2,500 people. It was part of STX Europe, a group of international shipbuilding companies owned by the South Korean STX Corporation.

Half of Helsinki yard was sold to Russian USC in 2010. In September 2013, STX Finland announced that the Rauma shipyard would be closed in June 2014. In August 2014, the Turku shipyard was sold to Meyer Werft and the state-owned Finnish Industry Investment, and renamed Meyer Turku Oy.

== History ==
STX Finland Oy was a descendant of different shipyard companies. Wärtsilä operated the shipyards of Helsinki and Turku since the 1930s. Wärtsilä Marine went bankrupt in 1989 after merging with Valmet shipyards. Masa-Yards was established by Martin Saarikangas with financing from the shipping companies to finish the ships under construction, eventually taking over the operations of Wärtsilä's former shipyards. In the mid-90s Kvaerner purchased Masa-Yards and Kvaerner Masa-Yards was born. In 1991 the shipbuilding businesses of Hollming Oy of Rauma and Rauma-Repola of Rauma were merged to form Finnyards. This company was purchased by Kvaerner and became Aker Finnyards. In January 2005 Kvaerner Masa-Yards and Aker Finnyards merged to form the "new" Aker Finnyards Oy. The name of the company was changed to Aker Yards Oy on 7 June 2006, and to STX Finland Cruise Oy on 23 November 2008. Since September 2009 the company has been named STX Finland Oy.

STX Finland and its predecessors built many luxurious cruise ships, including the very first modern purpose-built cruise ship, the Song of Norway. More recent cruise ships built by the company included the two Oasis-class vessels, Oasis of the Seas (2009) and Allure of the Seas (2010) which held the record for largest cruise ships in the world until 2015 when Harmony of the Seas was launched at STX Europe Chantiers de l'Atlantique shipyard in France.

=== 2012–2013 funding crisis ===
At end of 2012 STX negotiated with RCCL about an order of a large cruise ship. In order to secure the financial basis of the project, STX sent a request for loan of 50 million euros to the Finnish government and a copy of the request to media.

The Finnish government, then led by Katainen Cabinet, was put into a difficult situation. Employment at Turku yard was a sensitive topic for both ruling parties the National Coalition and the Social Democrats. While the sum was relatively small, financial status of STX was poor and according to an analysis the actually needed sum would be larger. It looked obvious that STX tried to press the Finnish government to first give a smaller sum which it would later use as a leverage for subsequent demands. The government was in a politically difficult situation, as the public, opposition parties and also own party members wanted to lend the money in order to secure the valuable order. The other option would have been becoming joint owner but the government did not want to have a financially unstable business partner. Instead, the government took another strategy – trying to find a new owner for Turku shipyard in secret from the Koreans and buying Helsinki-based naval engineering company Aker Arctic. The man behind the plot was Minister of Economic Affairs, Jan Vapaavuori.

Despite the high pressure, in December 2012 the government refused to provide the loan, with the formal excuse that EU does not allow giving subsidies to unprofitable companies. Turku shipyard lost the order which went to French Saint-Nazaire located Chantiers de l'Atlantique where the government was more generous. The decision of the Finnish government was received with consternation and vast criticism from every direction; however, the main opposition group Centre Party was moderate at judging the decision-making politicians, as the party leaders were aware of the poor condition of STX.

=== Salvage of projects under construction ===
STX Turku yard had two cruise ships under construction for the German TUI Cruises. The shipowner as well as other financiers of the projects had observed the financial situation of the shipbuilder and became distrustful on STX after the Finnish government's refusal of financing the new project. This led to opening of the financial basis of the TUI orders. The future of Finnish shipbuilding looked bad; a yard without order backlog would be worthless. Therefore, the ongoing projects had to be urgently secured. While the Finnish subsidiary was in crisis, the Korean owner remained passive. Negotiations with STX were challenging because it was difficult to find the right persons who have got the mandate to make decisions in the company, and the creditors, Korean Development Bank as the biggest one, had its word in the financial decisions of the heavily indebted company. The Finnish government got crucially important support from RCCL, main owner of TUI Cruises. RCCL made concessions to secure the financial basis. Speculatively, RCCL wanted to save the yard because it did not want to lose an important part of the global cruise ship building capacity. Moreover, STX sold the Perno shipyard area for €23.5 million and the state gave innovation support to STX. Financing of the TUI vessels was secured with these actions.

=== Rauma shipyard closure ===
The Finnish government and STX made a restructuring plan together with a consulting company in June 2013. According to the report, there would not be sufficient orders for both Turku and Rauma yards, with the recommendation that the Rauma yard should be closed down. At first STX was reluctant to close the Rauma yard, however the management was finally convinced about the need to cut down capacity; STX Europe was in cash crisis and was forced to liquidate some of its property. In September 2013 STX announced the closure of the Rauma yard and the sale of the area to the town of Rauma. While this led to an outcry, it fit perfectly with the plans of the government: the shipbuilding facilities were saved for a new start. Later, a new shipbuilding company Rauma Marine Constructions was established on the western coast.

=== Selling of Helsinki shipyard and Aker Arctic ===
The Helsinki shipyard was operated by Arctech which was jointly owned by STX Finland and Russian USC. The Finnish politicians urged Russian owners to buy the Korean half of Arctech. USC became a sole owner in December 2014.

The next step was to save Aker Arctic, a Helsinki-based naval engineering company specialised on icebreakers and arctic offshore projects. Again, the STX management as well as representatives of Korean Development Bank, were not willing to discuss. The Finnish government had to organise meeting by help of diplomacy, telling that it is not appropriate to reject a meeting with a minister. The company management did not want to make decisions but later the increasingly weakening situation forced STX to sell more of its property. Finally, STX sold Aker Arctic to Finnish Industry Investment on 17 December 2013.

=== Selling of Turku yard ===
The final step was finding a new operator for the Turku shipyard. The secret operation was under name Project Town Hall on classified papers. The Finnish government sought for a credible buyer for the yard and the German Meyer Werft was selected a strong candidate. The family company had significant cruise ship operators as customers but the yard is located in Papenburg, far inland next to a river that sets limits to the maximum size of the ships. Discussion with Meyer Werft was opened by STX Finland board member Lauri Ratia who travelled to Papenburg under assignment of the Finnish government and in secret from his employer. After hearing a cautiously positive answer Ratia contacted minister Vapaavuori who called the head of the family company Bernard Meyer. A Finnish delegation including Vapaavuori flew to Germany in November 2013 for a secret mission to sell a yard which the state did not own and neither had mandate to sell. Everything was done in secrecy because neither the Finnish government, nor Meyer Werft wanted that the Koreans knew about the plan because otherwise the price of the yard would have gone up. During meeting in Papenburg it came out that Meyer Werft was seriously interested in buying Turku shipyard and investing on it. During the visit the delegation noticed that the company puts a lot of effort on productivity and commits on their business; for the delegation, there was no doubt that Meyer Werft would be an ideal operator for Turku yard.

STX remained silent for the following months. The Finnish government started pushing the Korean owner; this step was under code name Project Santa Cruz. Vapaavuori travelled to Korea in May 2014 telling that the government has found "an unnamed industrial partner" which is interested in Turku shipyard. The STX representatives possibly thought that it was a local consortium. The founder of STX Kang Duk-soo was removed from office due to charge of fraud and this probably affected on STX to become more willing to sell the shipyard. Meyer Werft representatives visited at Turku shipyard in the same month and their calculations showed that the yard could be operated profitably. The company made a non-committing quotation for the yard, but buying was subject to having new orders in addition to the ones under construction. The government and Meyer Werft contacted RCCL and TUI Cruises, and after long negotiations, Turku shipyard received orders for two cruise ships from TUI Cruises. Meyer Werft and Finnish state bought Turku shipyard from STX in August 2014 for a nominal price, which, however, included liabilities of about €20 million.

== Delivered craft ==
=== Turku ===
- Oasis of the Seas for Royal Caribbean International
- Allure of the Seas for Royal Caribbean International
- Viking Grace for Viking Line
- Meri for Gaiamare
- Mein Schiff 3 for TUI Cruises

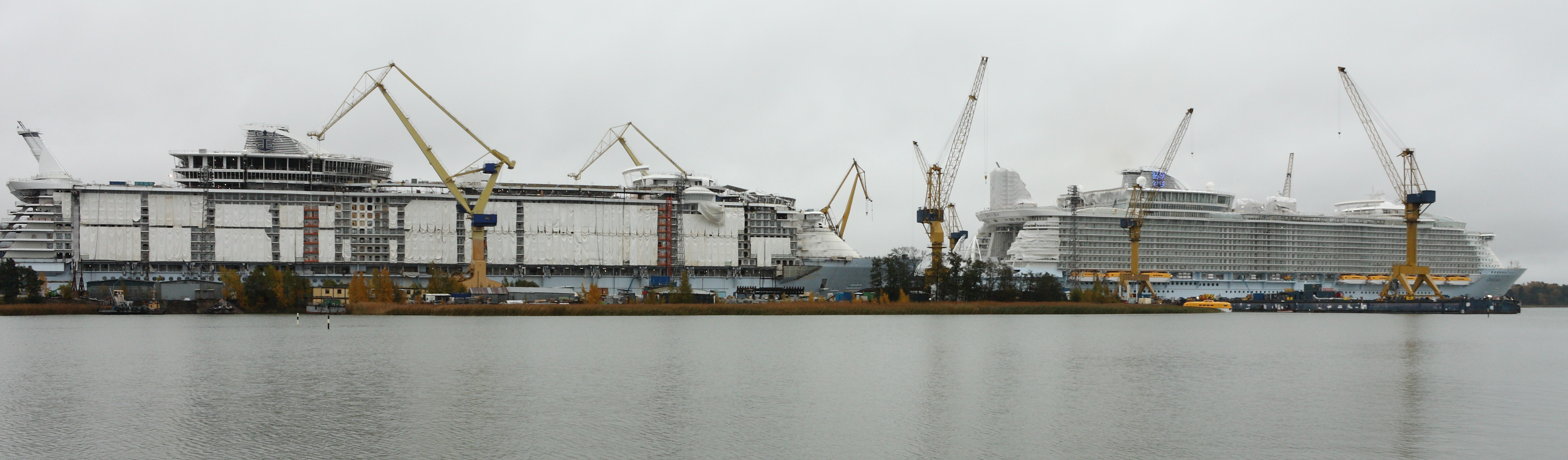
MS Allure of the Seas (left) and MS Oasis of the Seas (right) under construction at the Perno shipyard in Turku

=== Rauma ===
- S. A. Agulhas II for South African Department of Environmental Affairs
- Mirabilis for Ministry of Fisheries and Marine Resources of Namibia
- Turva for Finnish Border Guard
- Nils Dacke for TT-Line (conversion)

=== Helsinki ===
- Armorique for Brittany Ferries

== See also ==
- Crichton-Vulcan
- Finnish Maritime Cluster
