= Polar Security Cutter program =

United States Coast Guard program

- Rendering of the Polar Security Cutter design to be built by VT Halter Marine

Class overview
- Builders: Bollinger Shipyards
- Operators: United States Coast Guard
- Preceded by: Polar-class icebreaker
- Succeeded by: Arctic Security Cutter program
- Cost: $1.038 billion (first vessel); $794 million (second vessel); $841 million (third vessel); $5.1 billion (CBO 2024 estimate for three vessels)
- In service: 2024 (original plan); 2033 (current estimate)
- Planned: 3
- On order: 2
- Building: 1

General characteristics
- Type: Icebreaker
- Displacement: 22,900 long tons (23,300 t)
- Length: 460 ft (140 m)
- Beam: 88 ft (27 m)
- Ice class: Polar Class 2
- Installed power: Caterpillar main diesel generators
- Propulsion: Diesel-electric; two ABB Azipod propulsion units and one shaft line
- Endurance: 90 days
- Capacity: Berthing for 186 persons
- Armament: 2 × Mk 44 30mm autocannon; 6 × crew-served .50 caliber (12.7 mm) Browning M2 machine guns
- Aviation facilities: Helipad and hangar

The Polar Security Cutter Program is a program to recapitalize the United States Coast Guard's aging fleet of polar icebreakers, consisting of the heavy icebreaker USCGC Polar Star and the medium icebreakers USCGC Healy and USCGC Storis as of 2026, with three new multi-mission vessels referred to as Polar Security Cutters (PSC). These heavy polar icebreakers will allow the USCG to perform its statutory missions in the Arctic as well as support the United States Antarctic Program with Operation Deep Freeze.

The PSC program is managed by the USCG and United States Navy through an integrated program office. On 23 April 2019, Halter Marine Inc was awarded the contract for the detail design and construction of the lead PSC. The contract option for the second PSC was exercised on 30 December 2021. As of July 2023, the first vessel is expected to enter service in mid-to-late-2020s and will be named USCGC Polar Sentinel.

In the future, the PSCs will be followed by the acquisition of eleven medium icebreakers referred to as Arctic Security Cutters (ASC), with deliveries expected to start in 2028.

== Project timeline ==
In 2010, the High Latitude Mission Analysis Report identified a need for at least six new polar icebreakers, three of which must be what the USCG refers to as "heavy icebreakers". (Note: In U.S. parlance, "heavy icebreakers" are icebreakers capable of breaking ice up to 6 feet (1.8 m) thick at a speed of 3 knots (5.6 km/h; 3.5 mph).) In the same year, the USCG's only operational heavy icebreaker at the time, USCGC Polar Sea, was sidelined following engine failure.

In 2012, the USCG launched a heavy polar icebreaker acquisition program and, in 2016, established an integrated program office with the US Navy to utilize the Navy's shipbuilding expertise for acquiring the new icebreakers.

In February 2017, the USCG awarded five fixed-price contracts for heavy polar icebreaker design studies to Bollinger Shipyards, Fincantieri Marine Group, General Dynamics National Steel and Shipbuilding Company (NASSCO), Huntington Ingalls Industries, and VT Halter Marine. In addition to developing heavy polar icebreaker designs with associated cost and schedule figures, the goal of these industry studies was to identify design and system approaches to reduce acquisition costs and accelerate production timelines.

In April 2017, a draft system specification as part of a request for information (RFI) in which the USCG sought questions, comments and feedback related to technology risks, sustainability, producibility, and affordability of heavy polar icebreakers. A draft request for proposal (RFP) was released in October 2017, followed by the official request for proposal for the advance procurement and detail design for a heavy polar icebreaker with options for detail design and construction for up to three vessels in March 2018.

In September 2018, the Coast Guard announced that the icebreakers would be called "Polar Security Cutters", that they would have the designation WMSP, and that the Coast Guard wanted the icebreakers to be capable of carrying deck-mounted weapons if needed. The vessels will be homeported in Seattle, Washington.

On 23 April 2019, the $745.9 million contract for the detail design and construction of the lead PSC was won by Halter Marine. The contract also included options for the construction of two additional PSCs that, if exercised, would bring the total acquisition cost to $1.9 billion excluding government-furnished equipment. Halter Marine, one of the shipyards that had previously participated in the heavy polar icebreaker industry studies, reportedly beat out competing bids from at least Fincantieri Marine Group and Bollinger Shipyards. In its press release on 7 May 2019, Halter Marine stated that it had teamed with Technology Associates, Inc. (TAI) and based its PSC design on the proposed German polar research vessel Polarstern II. Other companies involved included ABB and Trident Maritime Systems for propulsion system, Raytheon for command and control systems integration, Caterpillar for main engines, Jamestown Metal Marine for joiner package, and Bronswerk for the HVAC system.

On 30 December 2021, the USCG exercised the $552.6 million option for the construction of the second PSC.

Initially, Halter Marine anticipated that the lead ship would be delivered in summer 2024, with the second PSC in 2025, and the third vessel in late 2027. However, as of July 2023 the lead ship has been delayed and the delivery may not occur until 2028. The Government Accountability Office has identified four primary factors contributing to delay in PSC design maturity: general lack of experience for designing and building icebreakers in the United States, the complexity of the PSC's design, significant changes from the original design, and impacts of the COVID-19 pandemic.

In November 2022, Bollinger Shipyards announced that it would buy VT Halter Marine and oversee the construction of the Polar Security Cutters. On November 22, 2022, Bollinger Shipyards announced it had completed the acquisition of VT Halter Marine and ST Engineer Halter Marine Offshore. Construction of the Polar Security Cutters will still be completed in Pascagoula, MS at what will be called Bollinger Mississippi Shipbuilding.

In August 2023, Bollinger Shipyards began steel cutting for eight "prototype modules" for the first Polar Security Cutter.

On 7 May 2024, the Congressional Budget Office testified before the Subcommittee on Transportation and Maritime Security of the Committee on Homeland Security. The Congressional Budget Office estimated that the total cost of three vessels would be $5.1 billion, about 60% more than the Coast Guard's estimate in March 2024, and the delivery of the first vessel would be in 2029. In December 2024, it was estimated that the vessel would be operational in 2030 at the earliest. When subcommittee chair Carlos A. Giménez asked why the Polar Security Cutter design was only 67% complete after five years of work, a Government Accountability Office witness explained that nothing like the Polar Security Cutter has been built in the United States in 50 years; American shipbuilders have no recent experience building large icebreakers. Coast Guard Vice Admiral Paul Thomas reminded the subcommittee that Halter Marine chose to base the PSC design upon the proposed Polarstern II design, rather than upon an existing Finnish icebreaker suggested by the Coast Guard. Because the Polarstern II had not been built at the time, its design was necessarily incomplete.

On 25 March 2025, Bollinger Shipyards secured a $951 million contract modification for the Polar Security Cutter program with the completion of the first vessel is anticipated by May 2030.

On 9 June 2026, the Government Accountability Office report estimated that the first vessel would be delivered in 2033 and the full operational capability of the Polar Security Cutters would be achieved in 2039, ten years later than originally planned.

== Design ==
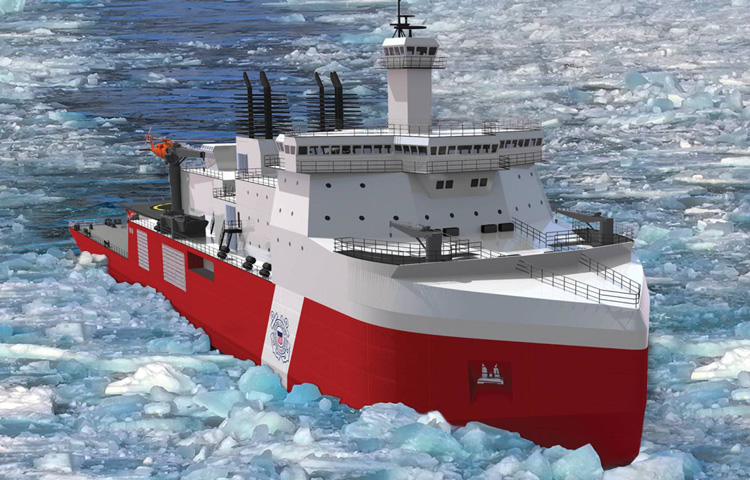
Rendering of a Polar Security Cutter at sea.

The Polar Security Cutters will be the largest icebreakers ever commissioned by the United States Coast Guard. With an overall length of 460 feet (140 m), beam of 88 feet (27 m), and a full load displacement of 22,900 long tons (23,300 t), they will be bigger, wider and heavier than the current record-holder, the medium icebreaker USCGC Healy. The general design is reportedly based on the proposed German polar research vessel Polarstern II which has been modified and adapted to USCG requirements such as long open water transit from its home port to Antarctica. The PSCs will have accommodation for up to 186 crew, scientists and other personnel, and endurance time of 90 days.

Like most icebreakers built worldwide, the PSCs will have a diesel-electric power plant rated at over 45,200 hp (33,700 kW). The vessels' main diesel generators will be supplied by Caterpillar and the propulsion system consisting of two Azipod propulsion units and a third fixed shaft line by ABB and Trident Maritime Systems. This will allow the PSCs to break ice with a thickness between 6 and 8 feet (1.8 and 2.4 m). Designed according to the International Association of Classification Societies (IACS) Unified Requirements for Polar Class Ships, the PSCs will be strengthened to Polar Class 2 which is intended for vessels operating year-round in moderate multi-year ice conditions.

The PSCs will feature a combat system derived from the Aegis Combat System. The vessels have been said to include "space, weight, and electrical power set aside to carry offensive weapons."

== Ships in class ==
Ship	Hull Number	IMO number	Laid down	Launched	Commissioned	Homeport	Status
Polar Sentinel	WMSP-21	4771085		2027 (planned)	2024 (original plan); 2033 (current estimate)	Seattle	Under construction
Polar Bear	WMSP-22	4777261				Seattle	Ordered
Polar Glacier	WMSP-23	4777273			2029 (original plan); 2039 (current estimate)	Seattle	Authorized in National Defense Authorization Act for 2023
