= Polar-class icebreaker =

Class of polar icebreakers

Polar class
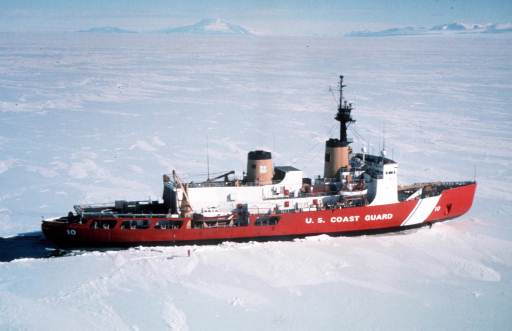
- USCGC Polar Star (WAGB-10)

Class overview
- Builders: Lockheed Shipbuilding and Construction Company, Seattle, WA
- Operators: United States Coast Guard
- Preceded by: USCGC Glacier
- Succeeded by: Polar Security Cutter
- Built: 1972–1978
- In service: 1976–present
- Completed: 2
- Active: 1
- Laid up: 1

General characteristics
- Type: Heavy icebreaker (USCG)
- Displacement: 10,863 long tons (11,037 t) (standard); 13,623 long tons (13,842 t) (full)
- Length: 399 ft (122 m)
- Beam: 83 ft 6 in (25.45 m)
- Height: 137 ft 10 in (42 m) (from waterline)
- Draft: 31 ft (9.4 m)
- Installed power: 6 × ALCO 251V-16F diesel engines 3,000 hp (2,200 kW) ea.; 3 × Pratt & Whitney FT4A-12 gas turbines 25,000 hp (19,000 kW) ea.
- Propulsion: Combined diesel-electric or gas (CODLOG); 3 shafts; controllable pitch propellers
- Speed: 18 knots (33 km/h; 21 mph); 3 knots (5.6 km/h; 3.5 mph) in 6-foot (1.8 m) ice
- Range: 16,000 nautical miles (30,000 km; 18,000 mi) at 18 knots (33 km/h; 21 mph); 28,275 nautical miles (52,365 km; 32,538 mi) at 13 knots (24 km/h; 15 mph)
- Complement: 15 officers; 127 enlisted; 33 scientists; 12-person helicopter detachment
- Aviation facilities: Helipad and hangar

Polar-class icebreakers are two heavy icebreakers operated by the United States Coast Guard (USCG). Cutters USCGC Polar Star (WAGB-10) and USCGC Polar Sea (WAGB-11) have reinforced hulls, special icebreaking bows, and a system that allows rapid shifting of ballast to increase the effectiveness of their icebreaking. The vessels conduct Arctic and Antarctic research and are the primary icebreakers that clear the channel into McMurdo Station for supply ships. Both are homeported in Seattle, Washington.

In addition to the two Polar-class icebreakers, the USCG has a third polar-capable icebreaker, USCGC Healy (WAGB-20).

Both Polar Star and Polar Sea are near the end of their effective lifetimes, and have spent years moored because they were in need of expensive and unbudgeted upgrades. In November 2013 four senators proposed an amendment to the 2014 Defense Appropriations Act authorizing the construction of four new Polar-class vessels, at a cost of $850 million each. The four senators sponsoring the amendment were Maria Cantwell and Patty Murray, from Washington, and Mark Begich and Lisa Murkowski, from Alaska. According to the Seattle Times the chances that the amendment will survive into the bill, as passed, are slim. On February 22, 2017, the U.S Coast Guard announced it had awarded five fixed-price contracts worth $20 million for the future heavy polar icebreaker design studies and analysis. The icebreakers are being replaced by 3 heavy and 3 medium icebreakers as part of the Polar icebreaker program. On May 18, 2017, Adm. Paul Zukunft said that due to changes in the Arctic, the Coast Guard may have to increase the number of the future icebreakers, and the future icebreakers may have a requirement for space, weight, and power reserved for offensive and defensive weaponry which may include an anti-ship missile package.
