= RV Mirabilis =

Deep-sea fisheries research vessel

History

Namibia
- Name: RV Mirabilis
- Owner: Ministry of Fisheries and Marine Resources
- Port of registry: Walvis Bay, Namibia
- Ordered: 11 February 2011
- Builder: STX Finland, Rauma shipyard, Finland
- Cost: $ 41,600,000
- Yard number: 1378
- Laid down: December 2011
- Launched: April 2012
- Completed: 28 June 2012
- In service: 2012–
- Identification: IMO number: 9619725; Call sign: V5-NM; MMSI number: 659620000
- Status: In service

General characteristics
- Type: Research vessel
- Tonnage: 2,131 GT; 639 NT; 795 DWT
- Length: 62.4 m (205 ft)
- Beam: 14.0 m (45.9 ft)
- Draught: 4.7 m (15 ft)
- Depth: 9.7 m (32 ft)
- Installed power: Wärtsilä
- Speed: 15 knots (28 km/h; 17 mph)
- Crew: 44

RV Mirabilis is a deep-sea fisheries research vessel owned by the Ministry of Fisheries and Marine Resources of Namibia.

She was built in 2012 by STX Finland Rauma shipyard in Rauma, Finland, to replace the ageing RV Welwitschia, which was gifted by Japan in 1994. The vessel was procured with the help of the Ministry for Foreign Affairs of Finland, which provided an interest free loan.

RV Mirabilis is fitted with a state of the art Raytheon Anschutz integrated bridge navigation system. The vessel maintains positioning during scientific survey work, using a Navis Engineering DP4000 dynamic positioning system.
