= Rauma Marine Constructions =

Finnish shipbuilding company

Rauma Marine Constructions Oy
- Type: Osakeyhtiö (Oy)
- Industry: Shipbuilding, defence
- Predecessor: STX Finland Rauma shipyard
- Founded: 27 March 2014; 12 years ago
- Headquarters: Rauma, Satakunta, Finland
- Area served: Worldwide
- Key people: Stig Gustavson (Chairman); Mika Nieminen (CEO)
- Products: Ferries and other commercial vessels, naval ships, floating structures
- Revenue: ▼€253 million (2025); €341 million (2024)
- Operating income: ▲€2 million (2025); $0.66 million (2024)
- Owner: Finnish investment funds Private investors
- Number of employees: 342 (12/2025)
- Website: rmcfinland.fi

Rauma Marine Constructions (RMC) is a Finnish shipbuilding company based in Rauma, Finland. The company's main products are car ferries, icebreakers and naval vessels.

As of 2026, RMC is building four Pohjanmaa-class corvettes for the Finnish Navy and has been contracted contracted to build two icebreakers for the United States Coast Guard.

== History ==
Rauma Marine Constructions was established by private investors with background in the Finnish shipbuilding industry shortly after STX Finland closed the Rauma shipyard in 2014.

In December 2015, the company received a major equity investment when the state-owned investment company Finnish Industry Investment became a minor shareholder together with Finnish investment funds managed by Finda and Taaleritehdas. An existing minor shareholder Kasvattajarahasto, an investment fund managed by Aboa Venture Management, also increased its share on the company.

RMC initially undertook refits and modernizations. In 2016, it secured its first new-building contract.

== Orders ==
=== Ferries ===
In June 2016, Rauma Marine Constructions and the Danish shipping company Molslinjen signed a 68 million euro contract for the construction of 158-metre (518 ft) roll-on/roll-off ferry for the Bornholm route. This was the first newbuilding contract awarded to Rauma after STX Finland announced the closure of the shipyard in 2013 and delivered the Finnish offshore patrol vessel Turva in 2014. The new ferry, Hammershus, was laid down on 4 August 2017, launched on 5 January 2018, and delivered in August 2018.

In October 2018, Rauma Marine Constructions and the Estonian ferry operator Tallink signed a letter of intent for the construction of an LNG-powered ferry with a capacity of 2,800 passengers for the Helsinki-Tallinn route. The 250 million euro shipbuilding contract was confirmed in March 2019. The 212-metre (696 ft) vessel, named MyStar, was initially scheduled to be delivered in early 2022. The steel cutting ceremony was held on 6 April 2020, the keel was laid on 18 September, and the vessel was launched on 12 August 2021. The delivery of the new ferry was delayed to 7 December 2022 and it began its maiden voyage from Tallinn on 13 December.

In early January 2019, another letter of intent was signed for a 120 million euro LNG-powered ferry for the Vaasa-Umeå route. The shipbuilding contract was signed on 21 January 2019 and the ice class 1A Super ferry would be delivered by May 2021. The vessel, named Aurora Botnia, was laid down on 13 February 2020 and launched on 11 September. The vessel's official christening and delivery ceremony was held in Vaasa immediately after sea trials on 25 August 2021.

In February 2020, a Memorandum of Understanding was signed between Rauma Marine Constructions and Spirit of Tasmania for the construction of two new ferries for Tasmania. The construction of the 1,800-passenger ferries was expected to begin in early 2021. In July 2020, Spirit of Tasmania advised this deal would not proceed due to the current and emerging economic problems caused by the COVID-19 pandemic; instead, the possibility of building the ferries locally in Australia was evaluated. However, in April 2021 TT-Line nonetheless signed a shipbuilding contract with Rauma Marine Constructions for two ferries with deliveries initially scheduled in late 2023 and late 2024. The construction of the first ferry, Spirit of Tasmania IV, began in February 2022, the keel was laid on 28 October 2022, the vessel was launched on 27 October 2023, and delivered on 12 September 2024. The construction of the second ferry, Spirit of Tasmania V, began in December 2022, the keel was laid on 1 November 2023, the vessel was launched on 19 July 2024, and delivered on 25 June 2025.

=== Naval and coast guard vessels ===
In September 2016, the Finnish Defense Forces Logistics Command signed a letter of intent with Rauma Marine Constructions in order to investigate the company's capability for building four multi-role corvettes for the Finnish Navy's Squadron 2020 fleet renewal program. In April 2017, this was followed by a 7.5 million euro design contract for the new Finnish surface combatant class that will replace three minelayers and four missile boats. A letter of intent for the construction contract was signed in the beginning of November 2018 and the final 647.6 million euro shipbuilding contract on 26 September 2019. The construction of the four-strong Pohjanmaa class began on 30 October 2023. The keel of the first vessel was laid on 11 April 2024 and the vessel was launched on 21 May 2025. The construction of the second vessel began on 9 October 2024, the keel was laid on 8 May 2025, and the vessel was launched on 21 May 2026. The construction of the third vessel began on 26 August 2025, the keel was laid on 14 January 2026, and the vessel was launched on 29 October 2026. The construction of the fourth and final vessel began on 14 January 2026 and the keel was laid on 4 August 2026. Full operational status is expected to be achieved in 2029.

On 9 October 2025, President Donald Trump and President Alexander Stubb signed a memorandum of understanding for the construction of medium-sized icebreakers referred to as Arctic Security Cutters for the United States Coast Guard. Rauma Marine Constructions is part of a consortium led by the Louisiana-based Bollinger Shipyard that would negotiate for the construction of a series of six icebreakers that would begin production in Finland and eventually transfer to the United States. On 26 December, RMC was awarded a US$1.12 billion (about 960 million euro) contract for the construction of two Arctic Security Cutters in Finland by 2028 while Bollinger will build four similar vessels in the United States. The contracts were finalized on 2 July 2026.

=== Other ===
Prior to major newbuilding orders, Rauma Marine Constructions completed a number of smaller construction and conversion projects to establish a subcontractor network and build the shipyard's capability for larger projects. These have included the construction of a floating entertainment center to the United Arab Emirates, conversion of the Finnish icebreaker Otso, and a facelift for the cruiseferries Silja Serenade and Silja Symphony. In May 2017, the shipyard was awarded the 13.7 million euro refitting of the Finnish research vessel Aranda.

== Shipyard and operations ==
Rauma Marine Constructions operates at the Rauma shipyard within Seaside Industry Park. The shipyard site is owned by the City of Rauma, and RMC uses leased facilities alongside other maritime businesses. The yard has an enclosed multipurpose construction hall used for the Finnish Navy’s Pohjanmaa-class corvettes. The hall was developed by a property company jointly owned by the city and RMC, with RMC leasing the building. Other facilities include steel-production areas, a dry dock, outfitting quays, a launching barge and a heavy-transfer ramp.

RMC manages shipbuilding projects using its own personnel and a network of specialist suppliers and subcontractors. For example, Enersense Works was contracted to carry out technical-area outfitting on the ferry MyStar, while Saab supplies and integrates the combat systems for the Pohjanmaa-class vessels built by RMC and its subsidiary RMC Defence. Workers employed by these firms are distinct from RMC’s direct employees: business records list 360 RMC employees in 2025, while the company reported a wider subcontractor workforce of more than 1,500 in 2026.

== List of ships built or on order ==
Ship name	Year	Type	Yard number	IMO number	Status	Notes	Image	Ref
Hammershus	2018	Ro-pax ferry	6001	9812107	In service			
Aurora Botnia	2021	Ro-pax ferry	6002	9878319	In service	Shipbuilding contract with Kvarken Link signed on 21 January 2019, following a letter of intent earlier that month.		
MyStar	2022	Ro-pax ferry	6003	9892690	In service	Shipbuilding contract with Tallink signed on 27 March 2019, following a letter of intent signed in October 2018.		
Spirit of Tasmania IV	2024	Ro-pax ferry	6009	9936587	Delivered	Shipbuilding contract for two ferries signed with Spirit of Tasmania on 14 April 2021 following a letter of intent signed in February 2020.		
Spirit of Tasmania V	2025	Ro-pax ferry	6010	9936599	Delivered			
		Corvette		4764850	Launched	Shipbuilding contract with the Finnish Navy for four Pohjanmaa-class corvettes signed on 26 September 2019, following a letter of intent signed in November 2018.		
		Corvette		4764862	Launched			
		Corvette		4764874	Launched			
		Corvette		4764886	Keel laid			
	2028 (planned)	Icebreaker	6011	1158579	Ordered	Shipbuilding contract awarded on 26 December 2025 following a memorandum of understanding signed by the President Donald Trump and President Alexander Stubb on 9 October 2025.		
	2028 (planned)	Icebreaker	6012	1158581	Ordered			
