= MyStar =

ROPAX ferry built in 2022

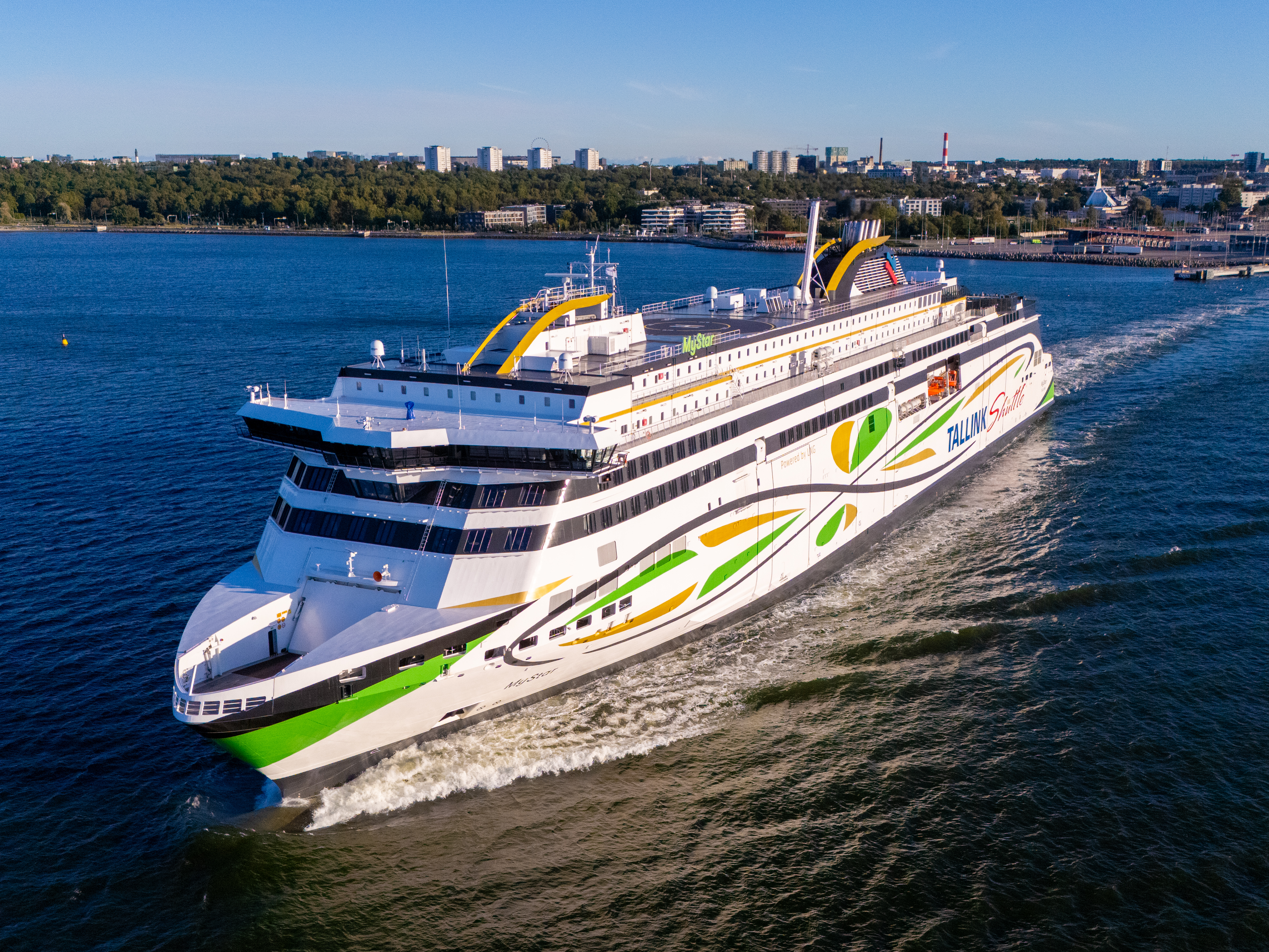
- MyStar in Tallinn

History

Estonia
- Name: MyStar
- Owner: Tallink
- Port of registry: Tallinn, Estonia
- Route: Tallinn–Helsinki
- Ordered: 27 March 2019
- Builder: Rauma Marine Constructions (Rauma, Finland)
- Cost: 250 million euro
- Yard number: 6003
- Laid down: 18 September 2020
- Launched: 12 August 2021
- Sponsored by: Kersti Kaljulaid
- Completed: 7 December 2022
- Identification: IMO number: 9892690; MMSI number: 276859000; Call sign: ESLR
- Status: In service

General characteristics
- Type: Ro-ro passenger ferry
- Tonnage: 50,629 GT; 16,011 NT; 5,936 DWT
- Length: 212.4 m (697 ft)
- Beam: 30.6 m (100 ft)
- Draught: 7.1 m (23 ft)
- Decks: 12
- Ice class: 1A
- Installed power: 5 × MAN 5L51/60DF (5 × 9,334 kW)
- Propulsion: Diesel-electric; two shafts (2 × 20.3 MW)
- Speed: 27 knots (50 km/h; 31 mph)
- Capacity: 2,800 passengers; 46 cabins; 1,900 lane metres for trailers

MyStar is a roll-on/roll-off passenger (ro-pax) ferry operated by the Estonian shipping company Tallink on the Tallinn–Helsinki route. The vessel was built by Rauma Marine Constructions in Rauma, Finland and entered service in December 2022.

As of 2024, MyStar is the newest ship in Tallink's fleet.

== Service history ==
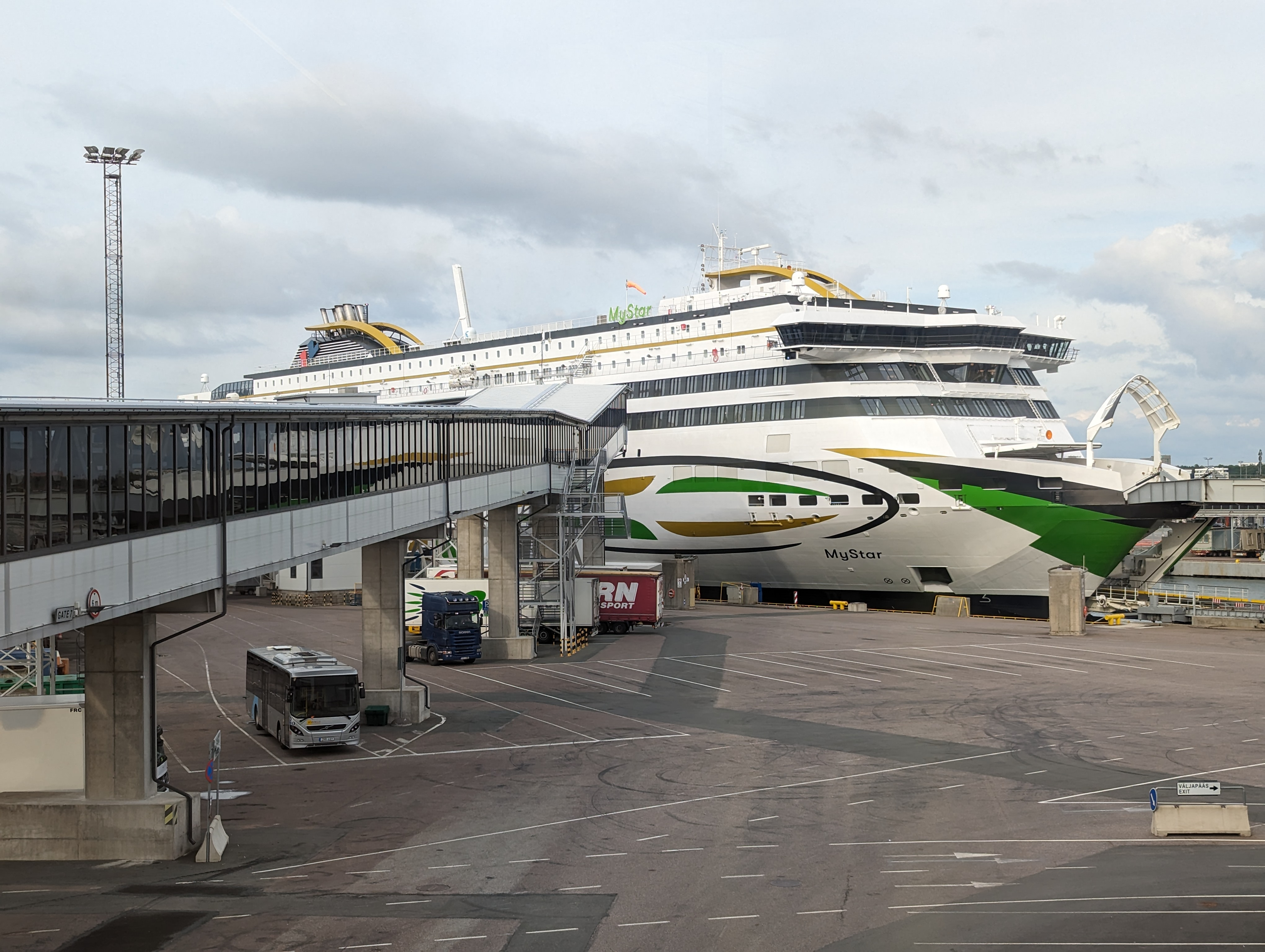
MyStar in Tallinn

After its completion and handover to Tallink, the vessel entered service on 13 December 2022 on the Tallinn-Helsinki-Tallinn route.

== See also ==
- Largest ferries of Europe
