= MV Hammershus =

Danish passenger ferry

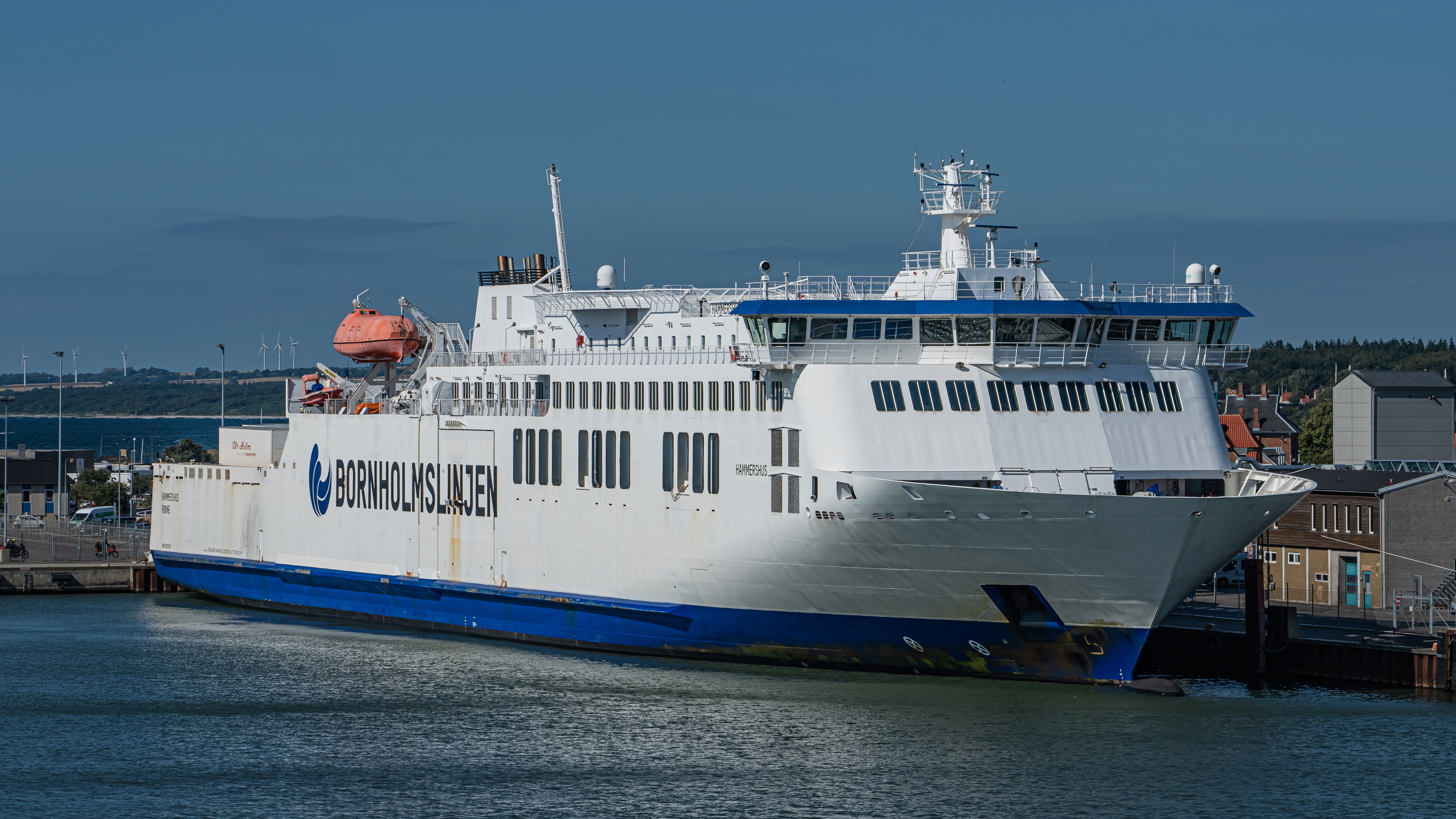
- Hammershus in Rønne on 18 July 2024

History

Denmark
- Name: Hammershus
- Namesake: Hammershus
- Owner: Molslinjen
- Port of registry: Rønne, Denmark
- Route: Rønne–Køge, Rønne–Sassnitz
- Ordered: June 2016
- Builder: Rauma Marine Constructions (Rauma, Finland)
- Cost: 68 million euro
- Yard number: 6001
- Laid down: 31 August 2017
- Launched: 5 January 2018
- Completed: 22 August 2018
- Identification: IMO number: 9812107; MMSI number: 219026000; Call sign: OXPQ2
- Status: In service

General characteristics
- Type: Ro-ro passenger ferry
- Tonnage: 18,009 GT; 5,402 NT; 5,110 DWT
- Length: 158 m (518 ft)
- Beam: 24.5 m (80 ft)
- Draught: 5.85 m (19.2 ft)
- Ice class: 1C
- Installed power: 2 × Wärtsilä 8V31 (2 × 4,880 kW)
- Propulsion: Two shafts; controllable pitch propellers
- Speed: 17.7 knots (32.8 km/h; 20.4 mph)
- Capacity: 720 passengers; 1,500 lane metres

Hammershus is a Danish roll-on/roll-off passenger (ro-pax) ferry operated by Molslinjen on the Rønne–Køge and Rønne–Sassnitz routes. The vessel was the first ship built by Rauma Marine Constructions and entered service in August 2018.
