= Kang Duk-soo =

Korean businessman (born 1950)

- Hangul: 강덕수
- Hanja: 姜德壽
- RR: Gang Deoksu
- MR: Kang Tŏksu

Kang Duk-soo (born 18 August 1950) is a Korean businessman. He currently serves as the chairman of STX Group, a South Korean conglomerate company (Chaebol), formerly known as SsangYong Heavy Industries.

He was born in Seonsan, North Gyeongsang Province, South Korea.

In 2014, Kang was sentenced for 6 years in prison for fraud, and in 2015, a court ruled that he was not guilty of accounting fraud.

== Education ==
- Myongji University, Bachelor of Business Administration (1974)
- Seoul National University, GLP (Global Leadership Program)
- Changwon National University, Honorary Doctor of Business Administration (2006)

== Career ==
- 1973–95, Ssangyong Heavy Industries
- 1997–2000, Executive Vice President and CFO, Ssangyong Heavy Industries
- 2000–01, President and CEO, Ssangyong Heavy Industries
- 2001–03, President and CEO, STX Corporation, STX Pan Ocean, STX Offshore & Shipbuilding, STX Engine, STX Energy
- 2003–present, chairman, STX Group

== Awards ==
- Silver Tower Order of Industrial Service Merit (Republic of Korea, 2003)
- Grand Prize of Global CEO (Japan Management Association Consulting, 2003)
- Best CEO of the Year 2005 Award (Changwon, 2005)
- Grand Prize for the 1st Korea Ocean Award (Marine Industry and Technology Organization, 2007)
- Honorary Citizen of Dalian City (Dalian, China, 2008)
- Personality of the Year in Seatrade Asia Awards 2008 (Seatrade, 2008)
- Shipbuilding Entrepreneur of the Year in Ernst & Young Entrepreneur of the Year Awards (Ernst & Young, 2009)
- CEO of the Year 2009 Award (Korea Management Association, 2009)
- Dasan Management Award (Korea Economic Daily, 2009)

== See also ==
- Economy of South Korea
- STX Europe ASA
