= CANSEC =

Defence and security trade show in Canada

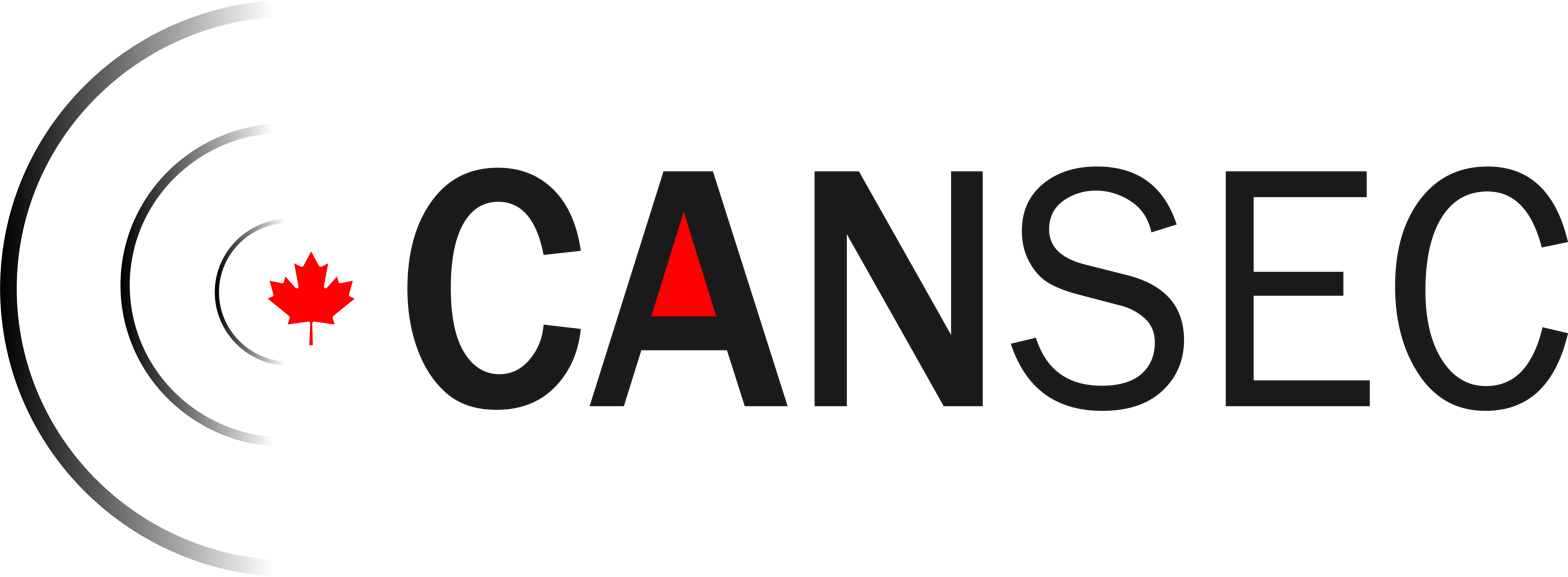
CANSEC's Logo until 2016

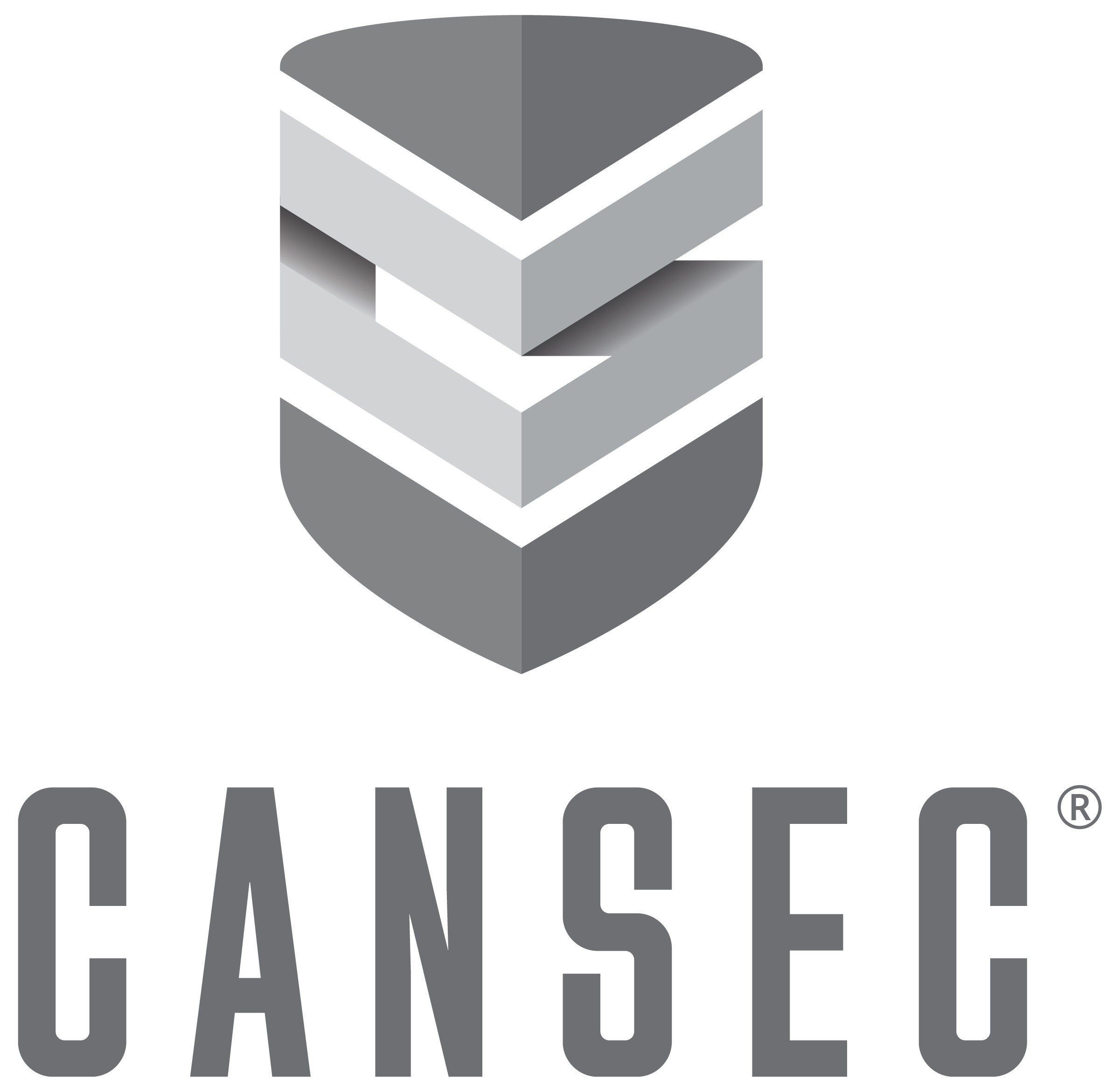
CANSEC Logo as of 2016

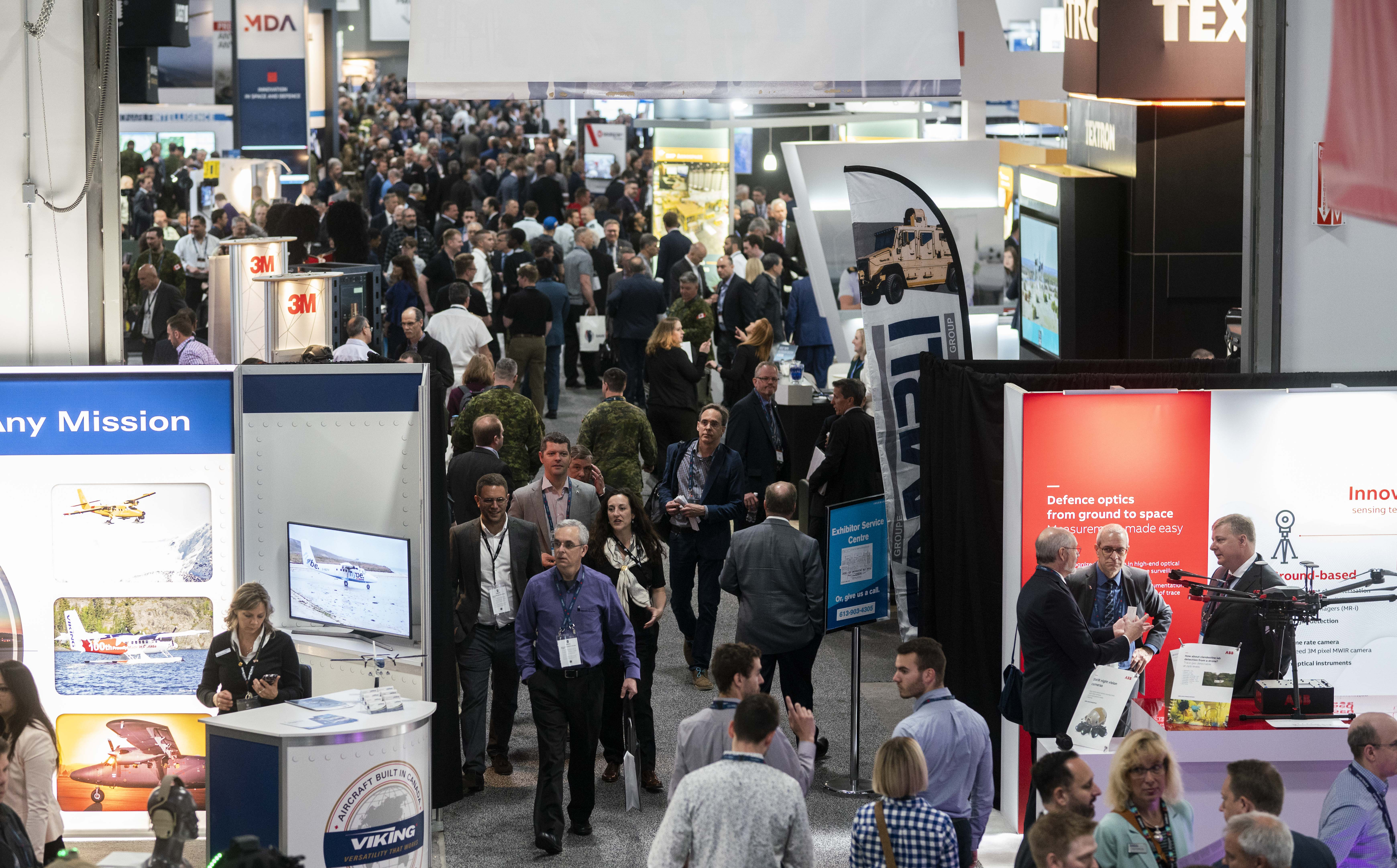
CANSEC Floor During the Show

CANSEC is Canada's global defence and security trade show hosted annually in Ottawa since 1998. It is hosted by the Canadian Association of Defence and Security Industries (CADSI), the national industry voice of hundreds of Canadian defence, security and cybersecurity companies. The two-day event showcases leading-edge technology, products and services for land-based, naval, aerospace and joint forces military units. It is not considered a conference, although it typically features up to four keynote addresses during breakfast and lunch meal events.

Over the years, CANSEC has grown to a global trade show that welcomes over 10,000 registrants from Canada and abroad to view Canadian goods, services and technologies sought the world over. All CANSEC exhibitors must be members of CADSI, and show attendance is only open to members, public servants, registered media, military personnel and representatives from allied nations. There is no public access to CANSEC.

CANSEC 2009 occurred at Lansdowne Park in the city of Ottawa. The event lasted two days and was a showcase of next generation military and police equipment. The event took place after the Mayor of Ottawa allowed a ban preventing military and police trade shows to take place on city property to expire, clearing the way for the show. The show occupied the three major buildings at Lansdowne Park and had a permanent police presence to discourage protesters and vandals. There were no serious incidents during the show, with protesters being kept off city property by private security and police. Protesters largely disbanded due to weather conditions and lack of shelter from the rain.

CANSEC 2010 took place at Lansdowne Park in the city of Ottawa from June 2 to 3. The event increased in size with the use of the Aberdeen Pavilion, Civic Center and Coliseum Building as well as a tented outdoor exhibit. Heavy rain during the event kept the protest much smaller as well as seemingly less notification of the upcoming event. Numerous members of the Canadian Forces were present at the event as well as guest speakers including Peter McKay. There were exhibits set up by Boeing, Lockheed Martin, Raytheon, DRS Technologies, and General Dynamics.

In 2019, CANSEC introduced a separate area devoted to leading-edge, cyber, and emerging technologies linked to defence, branded the "CANSEC Labs." Exhibitors in this area have included large companies such as Amazon Web Services and Google Cloud, and smaller Canadian SMEs specializing in a variety of technologies and services.

CANSEC was postponed in both 2020 and 2021 due to the COVID-19 pandemic. The show resumed in 2022 at Ottawa's EY Centre, attracting over 10,000 delegates, three Canadian cabinet ministers, and UK Minister of State (Minister for Defence Procurement) Jeremy Quin.
