= Aurora Botnia =

ROPAX ferry built in 2021

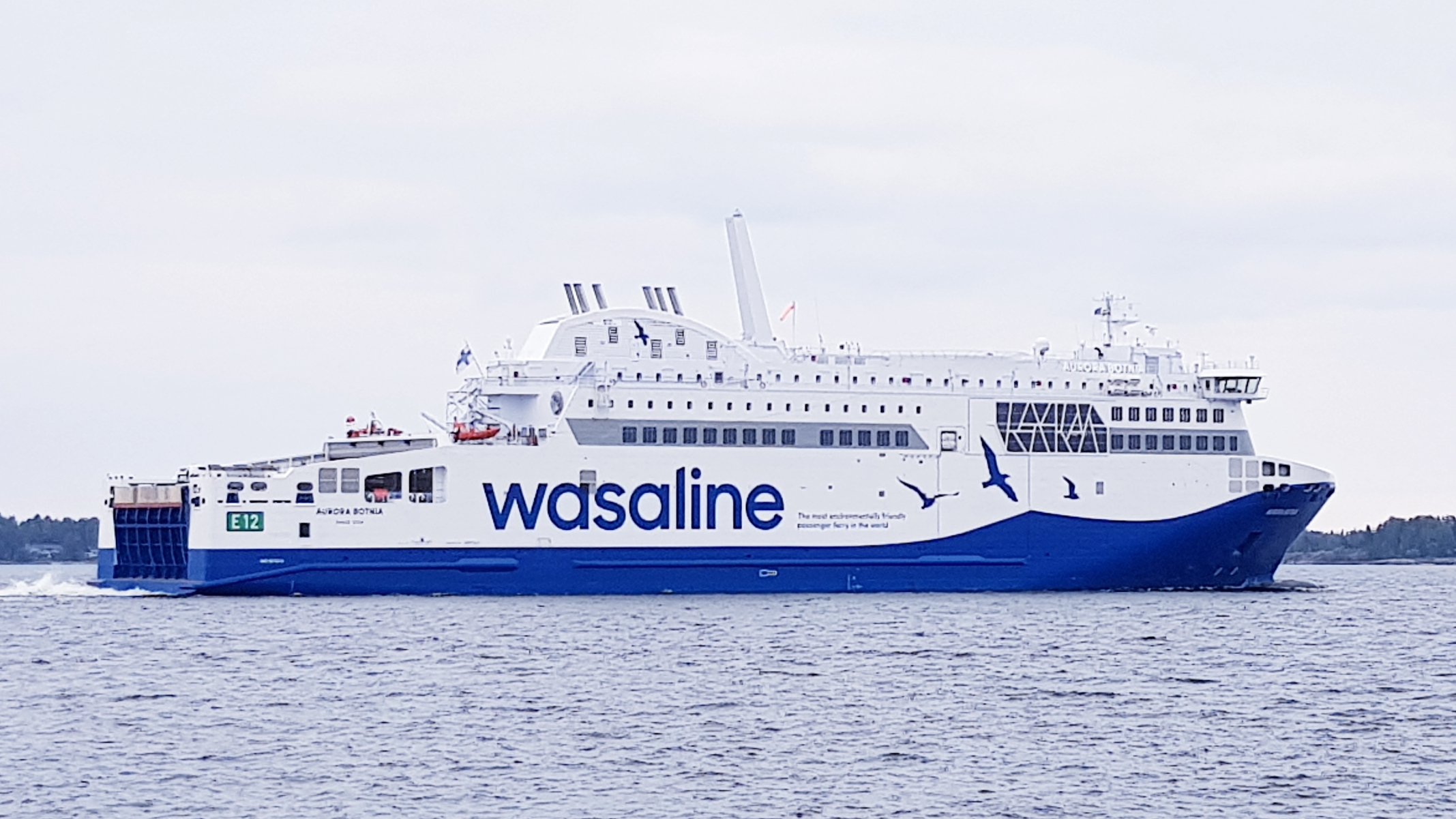
- Aurora Botnia leaving port on 18 September 2021

History

Finland
- Name: Aurora Botnia
- Owner: Kvarken Link
- Operator: Wasaline
- Port of registry: Vaasa, Finland
- Route: Vaasa–Umeå
- Ordered: 21 January 2019
- Builder: Rauma Marine Constructions (Rauma, Finland)
- Cost: 120 million euro
- Yard number: 6002
- Laid down: 13 February 2020
- Launched: 11 September 2020
- Christened: 25 August 2021
- Completed: 27 August 2021
- Identification: IMO number: 9878319; MMSI number: 230040000; Call sign: OJTR
- Status: In service

General characteristics
- Type: Ro-ro passenger ferry
- Tonnage: 24,036 GT; 7,264 NT; 3,500 DWT
- Length: 150 m (490 ft)
- Beam: 26 m (85 ft)
- Draught: 6.1 m (20 ft)
- Ice class: 1A Super
- Installed power: 4 × Wärtsilä 8V31DF (4 × 4,400 kW)
- Propulsion: Diesel-electric; two ABB Azipod units (2 × 5.8 MW)
- Speed: 20 knots (37 km/h; 23 mph)
- Capacity: 935 passengers; 1,500 lane metres for trailers

Aurora Botnia is a roll-on/roll-off passenger (ro-pax) ferry operated by the Finnish shipping company Wasaline on the 100 km Vaasa–Umeå route. The vessel was built by Rauma Marine Constructions in Rauma, Finland, and entered service in August 2021.

Wasaline has advertised Aurora Botnia, which features a dual-fuel power plant capable of running on liquefied natural gas and biogas as well as a battery system, as "the world's most environmentally friendly ferry". By 2026, the ferry is scheduled to have 12 MWh battery and supplied only with liquid biogas.

== Facilities on board ==
=== Restaurants and bars ===
- Archipelago Buffet
- Bistro Botnia
- Cafeteria
- Bar

=== Passenger facilities ===
- 68 cabins
- Business Lounge
- Comfort Lounge
- Playroom for children
- Pet Lounge
- Shop
- Conference facilities

== Photos ==
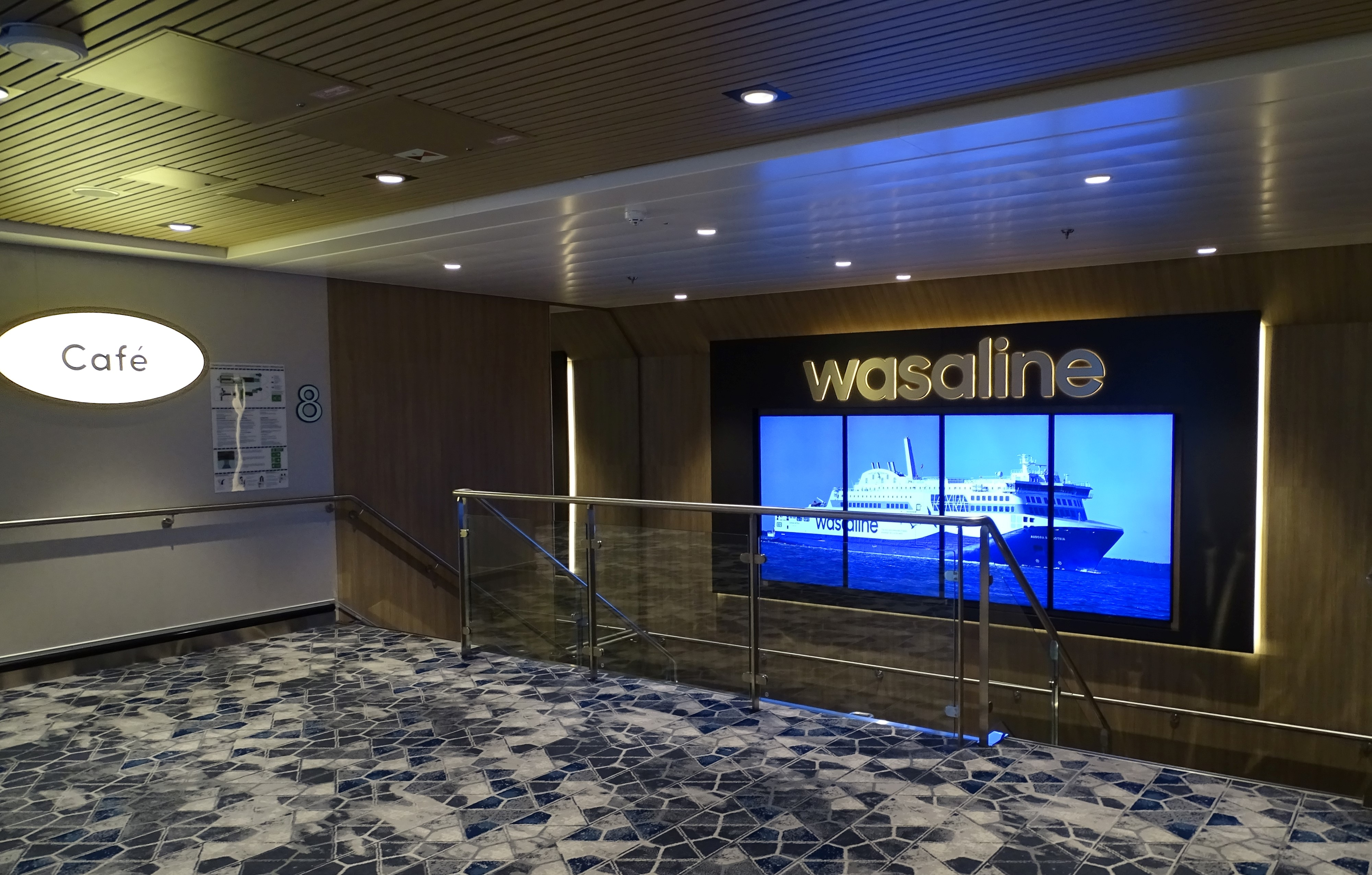
Interior of Aurora Botnia

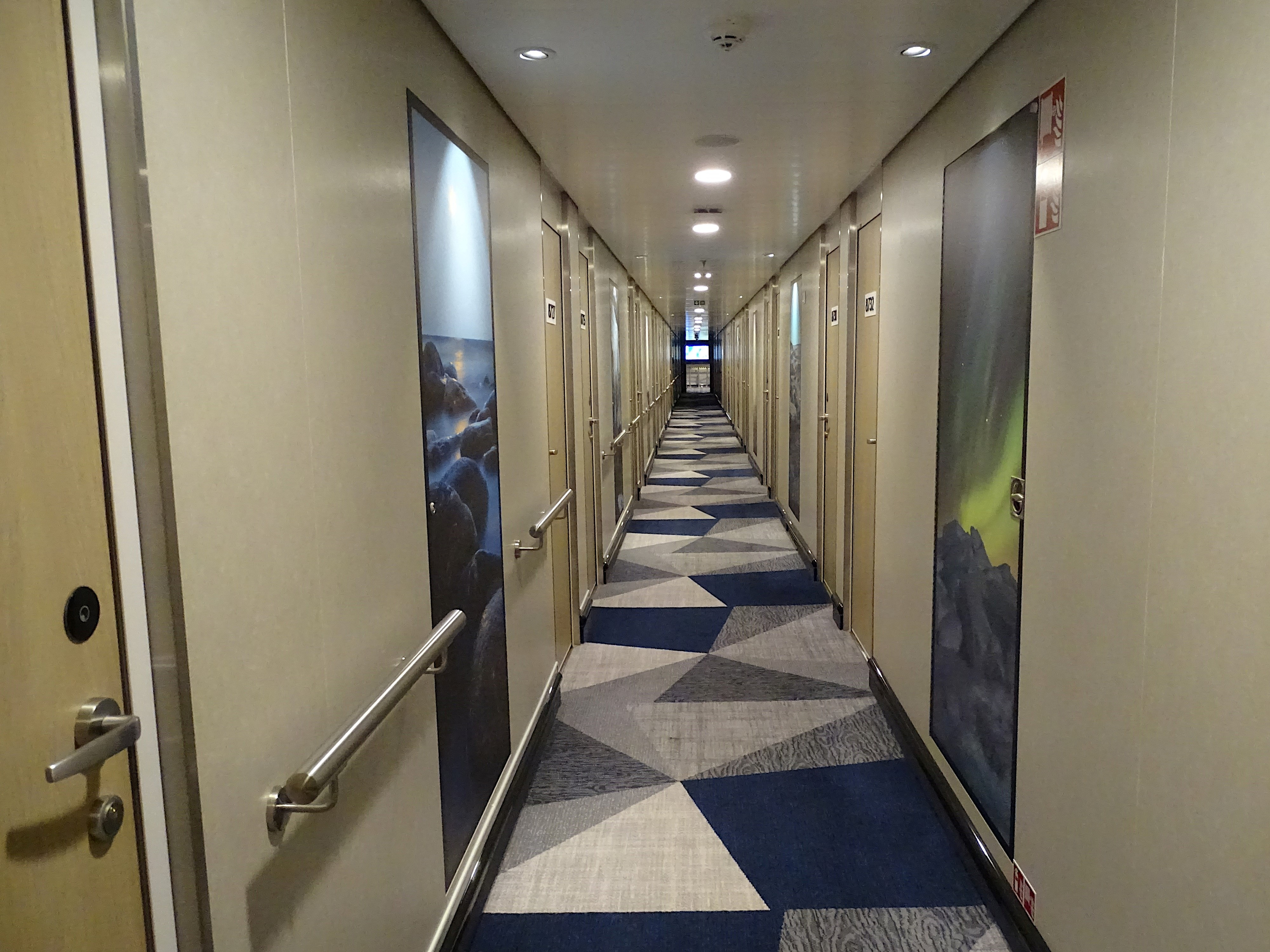
Cabin corridor
