= USCGC Polar Star =

United States Coast Guard heavy icebreaker ship

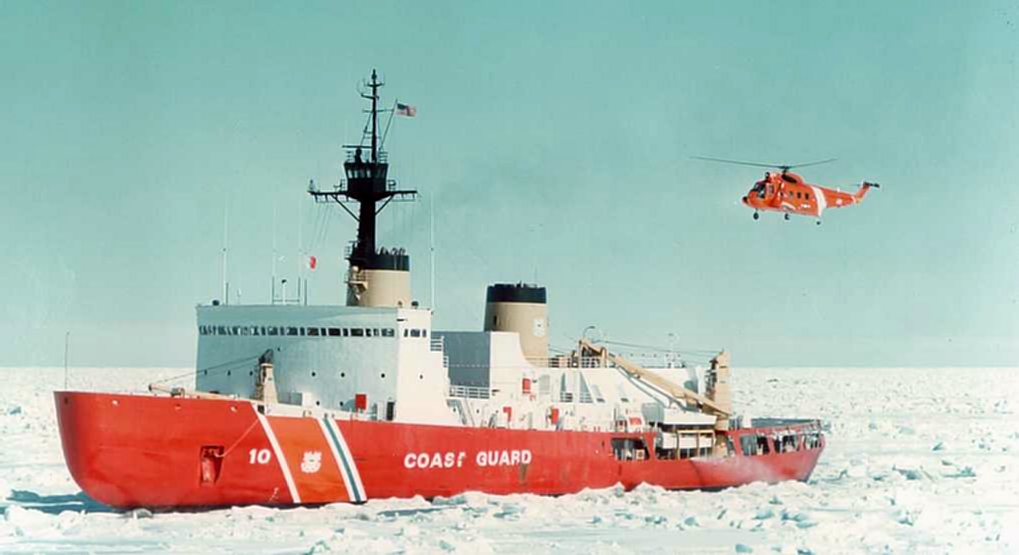
- USCGC Polar Star

History

United States
- Name: Polar Star
- Namesake: Italian-Norwegian wooden-hulled icebreaker, Stella Polar
- Builder: Lockheed Shipbuilding and Construction Company, Seattle, Washington
- Laid down: May 15, 1972
- Launched: November 17, 1973
- Commissioned: January 17, 1976
- Recommissioned: December 2012
- Refit: Vigor Shipyards, Seattle, Washington (March 2010 – December 2012)
- Identification: IMO number: 7367471; MMSI number: 367255000; Callsign: NBTM; Hull number: WAGB-10
- Motto: Naviget Bene Turbatum Mare (May she sail well through turbulent seas)
- Nickname(s): "Building 10", "Cell Block 10", "Polar Roller", "Polar Spare", "The Star", "Wide Ass Government Building", "P Star"
- Honors and awards: 2020 Hopley Yeaton Cutter Excellence Award (Large); 2020 American Society of Naval Engineering Lucas Plaque; Antarctica Service Medals (24); Arctic Service Medals (14); Navy Unit Commendation; Coast Guard Unit Commendations (8); Coast Guard Meritorious Unit Commendations (4);
- Status: In service

General characteristics
- Class & type: Polar-class icebreaker
- Displacement: 10,863 long tons (11,037 t) (standard); 13,623 long tons (13,842 t) (full)
- Length: 399 ft (122 m)
- Beam: 83 ft 6 in (25.45 m)
- Draft: 31 ft (9.4 m)
- Installed power: Six Alco 16V-251F diesel engines (6 × 3,000 hp (2,200 kW)); Three Pratt & Whitney FT-4A12 gas turbines (3 × 25,000 hp (19,000 kW))
- Propulsion: Combined diesel-electric or gas (CODLOG); Three shafts; controllable-pitch propellers
- Speed: 18 knots (33 km/h; 21 mph); 3 knots (5.6 km/h; 3.5 mph) in 6-foot (1.8 m) ice
- Range: 16,000 nautical miles (30,000 km; 18,000 mi) at 18 knots (33 km/h; 21 mph); 28,275 nautical miles (52,365 km; 32,538 mi) at 13 knots (24 km/h; 15 mph)
- Complement: 18 officers; 127 enlisted

USCGC Polar Star (WAGB-10) is a United States Coast Guard heavy icebreaker. Commissioned in 1976, the ship was built by Lockheed Shipbuilding and Construction Company of Seattle, Washington, along with sister ship, USCGC Polar Sea.

Homeported in Seattle, Polar Star operates under the control of Coast Guard Pacific Area and coordinates her operations through the Ice Operations Section of the United States Coast Guard. After Polar Sea was deactivated in 2010, Polar Star became the US's only heavy icebreaker. The Coast Guard's only other icebreaker, USCGC Healy, despite being classified as a "medium icebreaker", is larger than Polar Star (16,000 long tons versus 13,623 long tons, respectively), but needs assistance from a heavy icebreaker like Polar Star to operate in the Antarctic.

Replacement ships for what is called the Polar Security Cutter program have been ordered for a new generation of USCG icebreakers.

== Design ==
In August 1971 the Secretary of Transportation announced awarding of a contract to Lockheed Shipbuilding and Construction Company of Seattle, Washington, "to build the world's most powerful icebreaker for the US Coast Guard", Polar Star, the first of two Polar-class icebreakers.

The ship's three shafts are turned by either a diesel–electric or gas turbine prime mover. Each shaft is connected to a 16-foot (4.9 m) diameter, four-bladed, controllable-pitch propeller. The diesel-electric plant can produce 18,000 shaft horsepower (13 MW), and the gas turbine plant a total of 75,000 shaft horsepower (56 MW).

Polar Star's shell plating and associated internal support structure are fabricated from steel that has especially good low-temperature strength. The portion of the hull designed to break ice is 1.75 inches (44 mm) thick in the bow and stern sections, and 1.25 inches (32 mm) thick amidships. The curved bow allows Polar Star to ride up on the ice, using the ship's weight to break the ice.

The 13,000-ton (13,200-metric ton) Polar Star is able to break through ice up to 21 feet (6.4 m) thick by backing and ramming, and can steam continuously through 6 feet (1.8 m) of ice at 3 knots (5.6 km/h).

Later upgrades allowed it to serve as a scientific research platform with five laboratories, additional space for seven portable laboratories on deck and accommodations for up to 35 scientists.

== Operational history ==
In May and early June 1976 Polar Star conducted ice trials in the Arctic regions during Arctic West Summer (AWS76) operations. The starboard controllable pitch propeller failed, followed up shortly by the same type of failure on the port propeller. Removal of the wing propellers and opening of the hubs revealed massive failures of the links, link bearings, and drive pins. While the centerline propeller functioned satisfactorily, it too displayed evidence of incipient failure of the link bearings. Propeller issues continued through 1977–1988, leading Coast Guard to invoke the warranty clause of the Lockheed Shipbuilding and Construction Company.

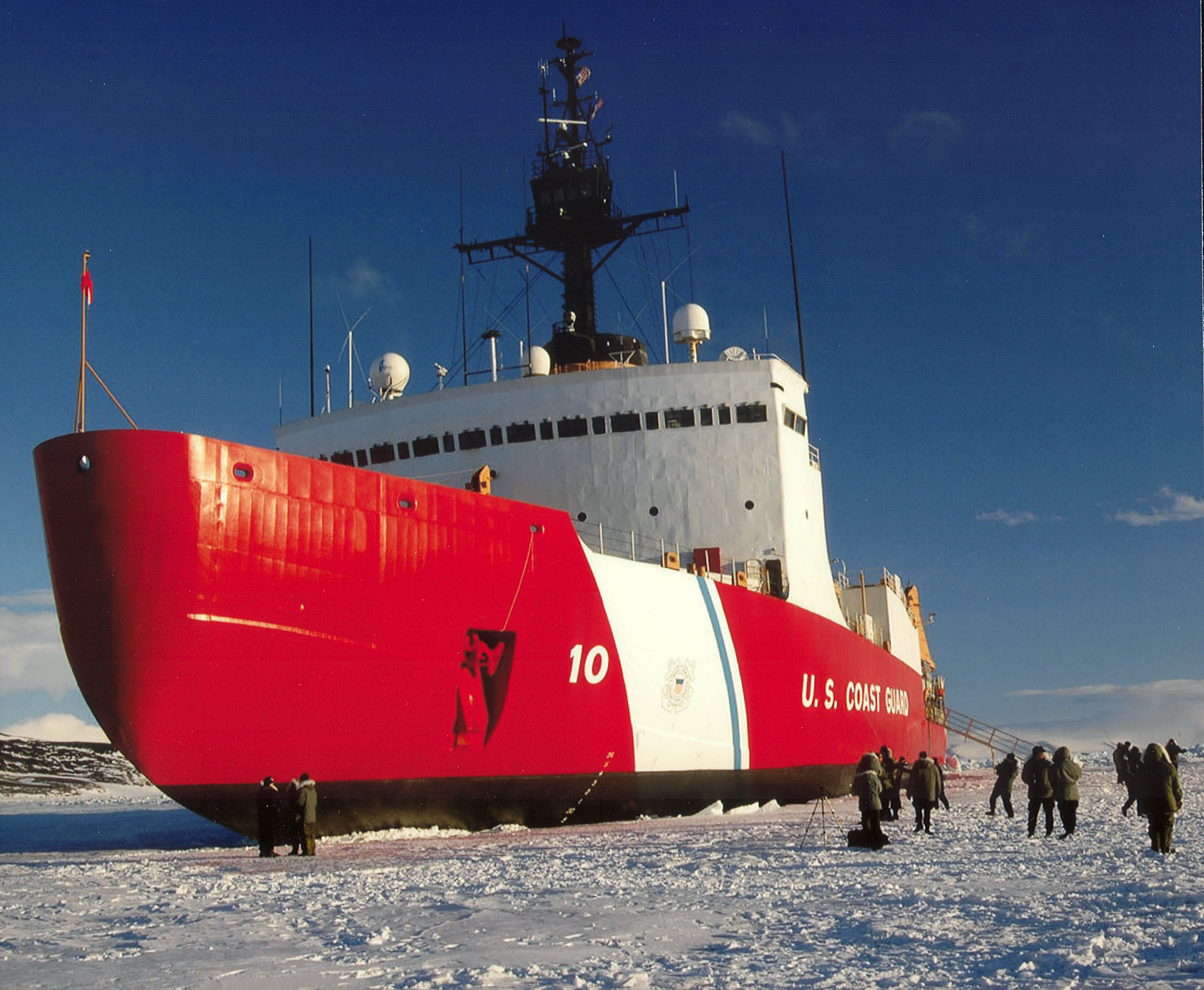
The upward angle of Polar Star's bow is designed so that the hull rides up onto the ice surface during icebreaking operations. Subsequently, the ship's weight and forward motion combine to fracture the ice.

Polar Star has supported National Science Foundation and United States Antarctic Program objectives in the Antarctic, breaking a channel through the fast ice to resupply the McMurdo Station in the Ross Sea and the close quarter ice escorts of Military Sealift Command resupply ships through the channel in support of Operation Deep Freeze, which deliver food, fuel, and other goods to the station annually. Polar Star is the only ship in the United States' fleet capable of breaking the fast ice in McMurdo Sound. Polar Star also delivered inspectors from the U. S. Antarctic Inspection team to foreign outposts for the purpose of Antarctic Treaty Inspections.

Arctic deployments occur regularly, including the annual resupply of Thule Air Base, Greenland, as well as science and power projection based operations referred to as Arctic East Summer (AES), Arctic West Summer (AWS), and Arctic West Winter (AWW).

In the 1997–1998 season, the ship supported the New Zealand Antarctic Research Programme. In February 1998 Polar Star received a report from the Green Wave that they were disabled and adrift off Cape Adare. Arriving on scene the next day Polar Star took the Green Wave in tow and proceeded on a 12-day 1,515 mile transit to Lyttelton, New Zealand. This was the first visit by a military vessel of the United States to New Zealand in 13 years.

=== Reserve status — Overhaul ===
The ship was placed in reserve, or "Commission-Special" status, in 2006 and stationed in Seattle. A 26 February 2008 report by the Congressional Research Service estimated a US$400 million cost for a 25-year service life extension refit for Polar Star, a US$56 million cost for an 8 to 10-year service life extension refit or US$8.2 million cost for a single season service life extension refit. This caretaker status required a reduced crew of 44 to keep the ship ready for a possible return to the ice. In 2009, the NSF announced that they would end funding for maintaining the ship.

The ship was reactivated for overhaul, which took four years and was completed by Seattle's Vigor Shipyards (formerly Todd Pacific shipyard), at a cost of US$57 million. Polar Star was back in operation in late 2013, and assigned to Antarctic operations as part of Operation Deep Freeze in early 2014 for the first time since 2006.

=== Return to service ===
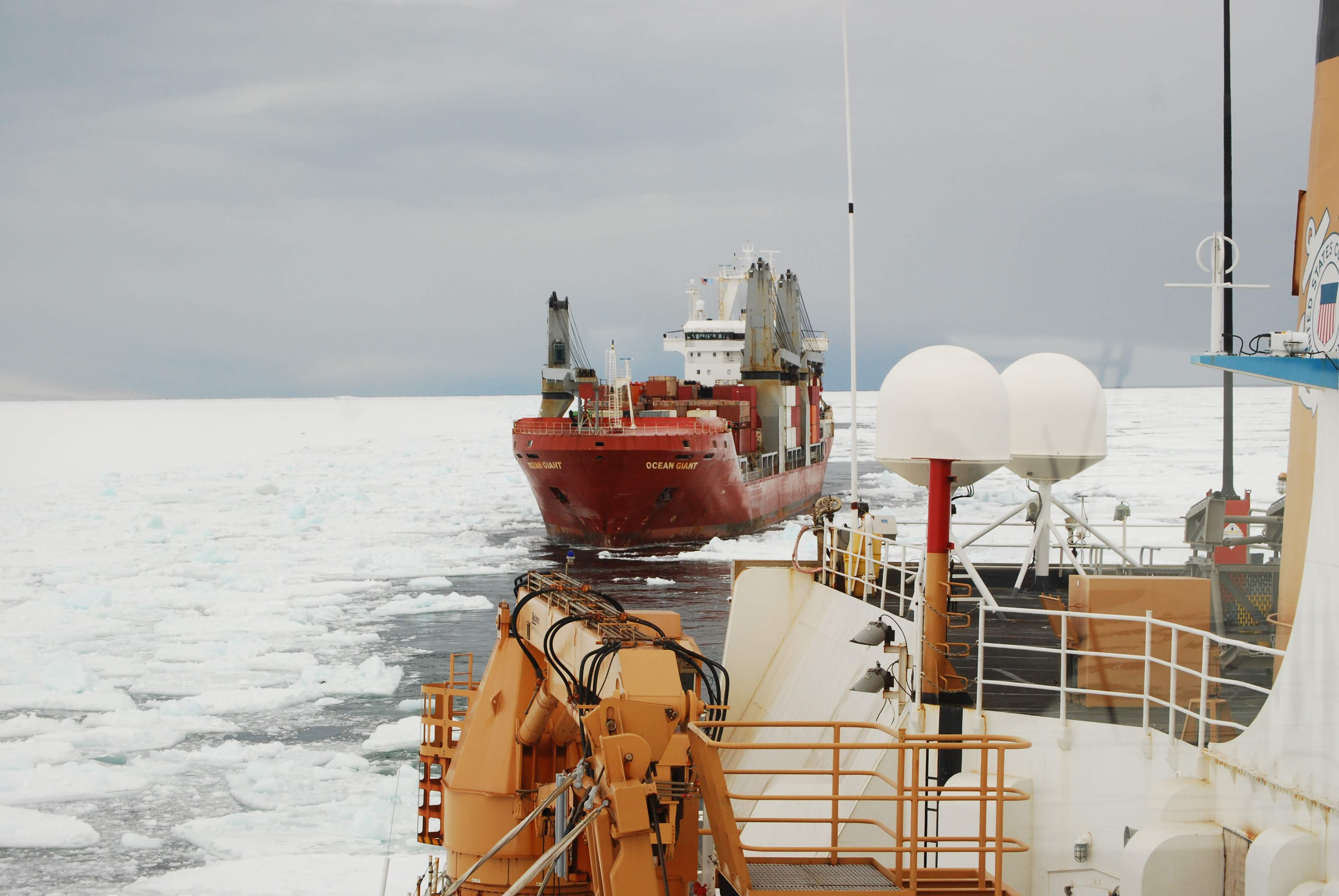
Polar Star makes a channel for a cargo ship, 2019

On Christmas 2020, Polar Star reached 72 degrees 11 minutes north, the farthest north any US government surface vessel has reached in the winter. The Arctic West Winter mission included travel in heavy ice in total darkness and joint exercises with Russian aircraft at the US Russian maritime boundary in the Bering Sea. During the deployment Polar Star made port calls in Dutch Harbor and Juneau, Alaska.

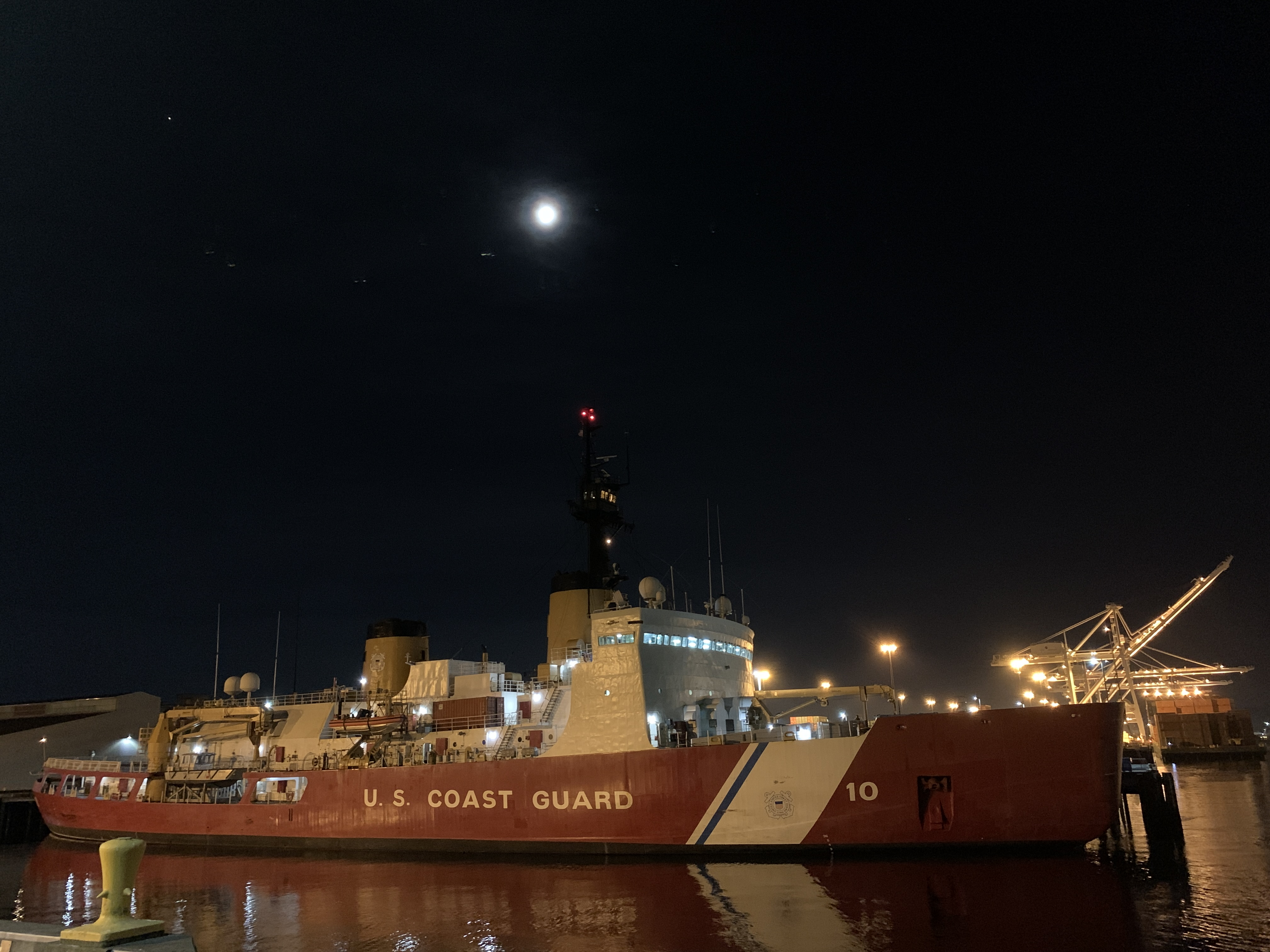
Moored Base Seattle

On Jan 13, 2021 the Coast Guard awarded Mare Island Dry Dock LLC of Vallejo, California, a contract to carry out a comprehensive overhaul of Polar Star under the Service Life Extension Program (SLEP). The contracted SLEP work, along with normal periodic shipyard maintenance, was planned to take place over five years, from 2021 through 2025, in annual shipyard visits that would not interfere with the icebreaker's operational commitments such as Operation Deep Freeze.

On September 1, 2022, Polar Star returned to its Seattle homeport after completing sea trials for the second phase of SLEP work. The phase was completed in Seattle after her return. Two control and monitoring systems for the ship's propulsion system were replaced by the Naval Surface Warfare Center, Philadelphia Division and the Coast Guard Yard, and the ship's galley was rebuilt. The third phase of SLEP work was completed on October 20, 2023, and included updates to communications, fire detection, and water-quality monitoring equipment. The fourth phase included extensive work on heating, ventilation, and air conditioning systems; replacement of the boilers which provide heat and fresh water; and redesign of the flooding detection system. This phase ended on August 30, 2024.

From November 22, 2024, to April 2, 2025, Polar Star was underway to support Operation Deep Freeze 2025 in Antarctica, its 28th voyage to the continent. Afterwards, Polar Star went directly to Mare Island Dry Dock in Vallejo to complete the final SLEP year. Among other tasks, one of the ship's nine diesel engines was overhauled, important work was done on sanitary systems, and work continued on heating, ventilation and air conditioning systems. The center propeller shaft was removed for maintenance and all three propellers were replaced, as were the gyrocompass repeaters. Afterwards, Polar Star finally returned to its homeport of Seattle, arriving on September 25, 2025 after 308 days away. On January 17, 2026, Polar Star rescued and guided Scenic Eclipse II, a cruise ship owned by the Australian cruise line Scenic, which had become stuck in a pack of ice.

Over the course of its service life, Polar Star has steamed in all five oceans, made calls in more than 60 ports across six continents; circumnavigated North America, South America, and Antarctica (likely the first such circumnavigation since 1843 as well as the first to do so completely poleward of 60^{o}); rounded Cape Horn, transited the North West Passage, and circumnavigated Earth. Operational highlights include Deep Freeze '83 - the circumnavigation of Antarctica completed in 69 days ferrying U.S. State Department inspectors to 14 scientific research stations, assisting with waterside security during the 1984 Los Angeles Summer Olympics, completing the first solo breakout of McMurdo Sound (Operation Deep Freeze 1988), seven consecutive Operation Deep Freeze missions between 2014 and 2020, as well as reaching 72 degrees 11 minutes north (the farthest north any US government surface vessel reached in the winter). Since its commissioning on January 17, 1976, Polar Star's 28 deployments in support of Operation Deep Freeze through 2025 are second only to USCGC Glacier (WAGB-4) and her 29 Deep Freeze missions.

== Bibliography ==
- Baker, A. D. (1998). The Naval Institute Guide to Combat Fleets of the World 1998–1999. Annapolis, Maryland, USA: Naval Institute Press. ISBN 1-55750-111-4.
- Moore, John (1985). Jane's Fighting Ships 1985–86. London: Jane's Yearbooks. ISBN 0-7106-0814-4.
