= USCGC Polar Sea =

United States Coast Guard heavy icebreaker ship

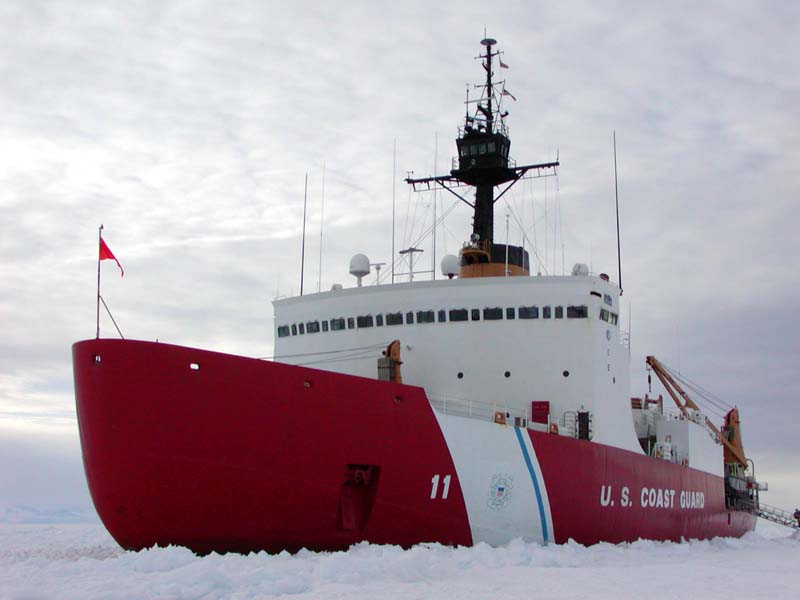

History

United States
- Builder: Lockheed Shipbuilding and Construction Company, Seattle, WA
- Commissioned: 23 February 1978
- Identification: IMO number: 7391252
- Motto: Always Summer, Never Warm
- Nickname(s): Building 11, Polar Roller, What a Great Boat, Wandering Arctic Garbage Barge, Red Tubs of Fun, We Always Go Bye-Bye
- Status: Out of service since 2010

General characteristics
- Class & type: Polar-class icebreaker - Heavy
- Displacement: 10,863 long tons (11,037 t) (standard); 13,623 long tons (13,842 t) (full)
- Length: 399 ft (122 m)
- Beam: 83 ft 6 in (25.45 m)
- Draft: 31 ft (9.4 m)
- Installed power: Six Alco 16V-251F diesel engines (6 × 3,000 hp); Three Pratt & Whitney FT-4A12 gas turbines (3 × 25,000 hp)
- Propulsion: Combined diesel-electric or gas (CODLOG); Three shafts; controllable-pitch propellers
- Speed: 18 knots (33 km/h; 21 mph); 3 knots (5.6 km/h; 3.5 mph) in 6-foot (1.8 m) ice
- Range: 16,000 nautical miles (30,000 km; 18,000 mi) at 18 knots (33 km/h; 21 mph); 28,275 nautical miles (52,365 km; 32,538 mi) at 13 knots (24 km/h; 15 mph)
- Complement: 15 officers; 127 enlisted; 33 scientists; 12-person helicopter detachment
- Aircraft carried: 2 HH-65C Dolphin helicopters

USCGC Polar Sea (WAGB-11) is a United States Coast Guard heavy icebreaker. Commissioned on 23 February 1978, the ship was built by Lockheed Shipbuilding and Construction Company of Seattle along with her sister ship, Polar Star (WAGB-10). Her home port is Seattle, Washington.

Polar Sea has been out of service as of 2010 due to failure of five of her six Alco main diesel engines. Between 2010 and 2023, Polar Sea has been used as a parts donor for sister ship Polar Star. In 2024, the ship was towed to and placed in mothball status in Suisun Bay, California.

== Machinery ==
Polar Sea has a computerized propulsion control system to effectively manage six diesel-powered propulsion generators, three diesel-powered ship's service generators, three propulsion gas turbines, and other equipment vital to the operation of the ship. Its three shafts are each turned by either one gas turbine or two diesel-electric power plants. Each shaft is connected to a 16-foot (4.9-m) diameter, four-bladed, controllable-pitch propeller. For all three shafts, the diesel-electric plants can produce a total of 18,000 shaft horsepower (13,425 kilowatts) and the gas turbine plants a total of 75,000 demand shaft horsepower (56 MW) or 60,000 continuous horsepower (44.8 MW).

== Hull design and strength ==
Polar Sea has sufficient hull strength to absorb the high-powered icebreaking common to her operations. The shell plating and associated internal support structure are fabricated from steel with superior low-temperature strength. The portion of the hull designed to ram ice is 1 3/4 inches thick (44 mm) in the bow and stern sections, and 1 1/4 inches thick (32 mm) amidships. The hull strength is produced almost entirely from a sophisticated internal support structure that features canted ribs for approximately the forward two-thirds of the ship's frame. Polar Sea's hull shape is designed to maximize icebreaking by efficiently combining the forces of the ship's forward motion, the downward pull of gravity on the bow, and the upward push of the inherent buoyancy of the stern. The curved bow and heavy weight allows Polar Sea to force ice edges to break off downward as cusps. This design does not use sharp edges or hammer-like blows to cut or break the ice, as the round bow and massive weight are sufficient. With high power to back it up, the 13,000-ton (13,200-metric ton) Polar Sea is able to continuously progress through 6 feet (1.8 m) of new hard ice at 3 knots (6 km/h) and break up to 21 feet when using back-and-ram methods. An extreme exception to this occurred during a rapid transit to Pt. Barrow, Alaska between January 29 and February 11, 1981. While traversing 1000 miles of sea ice, Polar Sea was able to break through ice up to 40 ft thick.

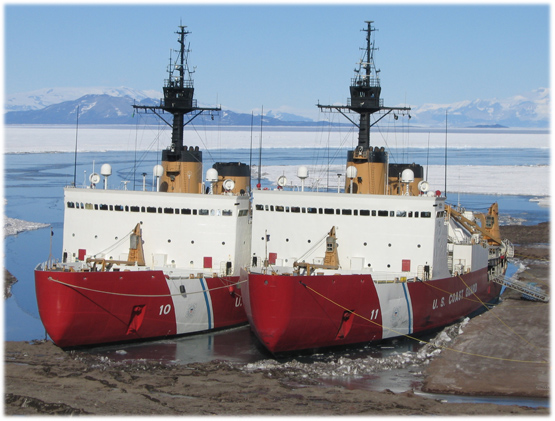
Polar Sea alongside her sister ship Polar Star (WAGB-10) near McMurdo Station, Antarctica.

== Crew ==
There is a crew of 24 officers, 20 chief petty officers and 102 enlisted. The ship has four sizable lounges, a library, gym (in an engineering space), and a small ship's store. It also has its own U.S. Post Office, satellite pay telephones, amateur radio equipment, photo lab, and movie library.

== Missions ==
Polar Sea has a variety of missions while operating in polar regions. During Antarctic deployments, the primary missions include breaking a channel through the sea ice to resupply the McMurdo Station in the Ross Sea. Resupply ships use the channel to bring food, fuel, and other goods to make it through another winter. In addition to these duties, Polar Sea also serves as a scientific research platform with five laboratories, additional space for seven portable laboratories on deck and accommodations for up to 35 scientists. The J-shaped cranes and work areas near the stern and port side of ship give scientists the capability to do at-sea studies in the fields of geology, vulcanology, oceanography, sea-ice physics and other disciplines.

== Aircraft carried ==
Polar Sea carried two HH-65 Dolphin helicopters during major deployments. They support scientific parties, do ice reconnaissance, cargo transfer, and search and rescue as required. The Aviation Detachment comes from the Polar Operations Division at Coast Guard Aviation Training Center, Mobile, Alabama.

== Notable operations ==
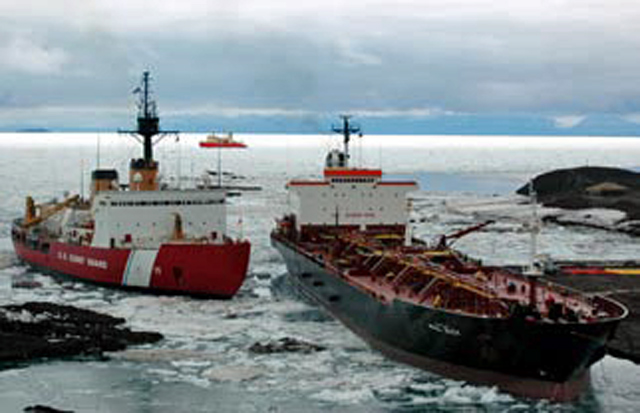
Polar Sea, RV Nathaniel Palmer, and tanker Paul Buck, in Antarctica

On 11 February 1981, Polar Sea made history when she became the first ship ever to reach Point Barrow, Alaska in the middle of winter. On 13 March 1981, the ship got stuck in the ice, and took advantage of this to initiate several scientific studies.

She is also just one of only three ships that has ever completely transited the Arctic Ocean and circumnavigated North America. On 22 August 1994, Polar Sea was one of the first two North American surface vessels to reach the North Pole; she sailed together with CCGS Louis S. St-Laurent.

== 1985 controversy ==
In 1985, Polar Sea triggered a diplomatic event by navigating the Northwest Passage from Greenland to Alaska without authorization from the Canadian government. It was the United States' position that the Northwest Passage was an international strait open to shipping and it sought only to notify Canada rather than ask for permission. Publication of the plans enraged the Canadian public opinion as it was regarded as a breach and disregard of sovereignty and prompted the government to take preventive measures in defending Canada's arctic territories. The U.S. never recognized Canada's claim over the Northwest passage but nevertheless, the two countries reached an agreement two years later which stipulated that in the future, the U.S. would ask permission before navigating the disputed waters.

== Service status ==
Polar Sea has been out of service since 2010. Andrew Revkin wrote at that time, "Five of its six mighty engines are stilled, some with worn pistons essentially welded to their sleeves." Examination of her engines indicated excessive engine wear. In 2011 the Coast Guard slated Polar Sea for decommissioning that year, but the scrapping of the 35-year-old icebreaker was postponed by Congress for at least six months in June. A congressional authorization required the Coast Guard to make a report to Congress on the feasibility of retrofitting Polar Sea. One of the authorization's sponsors, U.S. Representative Rick Larsen, wrote in a Seattle Times op-ed that the report was submitted in November 2013 and indicated that it was feasible to retrofit and reactivate Polar Sea. In February 2017, it was stated that Polar Sea would not be refurbished due to high cost; instead, the icebreaker would be used as a "parts donor" for Polar Star.

Starting in 2021, Polar Sea's continuous presence at her pier at USCG Station Seattle became increasingly inconvenient because she was blocking local Coast Guard civil engineering projects. Polar Sea was first towed to Mare Island Drydock in Vallejo, California to scrub marine growth from her hull, and then to the Suisun Bay Reserve Fleet at Benicia, California. In order to allow Polar Sea to pass under a railroad bridge en route to the Fleet, her mast was cut off just above the aloft conning station and tied down to the icebreaker's flight deck. Polar Sea entered the Suisun Bay Reserve Fleet on October 6, 2024.

== Bibliography ==
- Baker, A. D. (1998). The Naval Institute Guide to Combat Fleets of the World 1998–1999. Annapolis, Maryland, USA: Naval Institute Press. ISBN 1-55750-111-4.
- Moore, John (1985). Jane's Fighting Ships 1985–86. London: Jane's Yearbooks. ISBN 0-7106-0814-4.
