= STX Corporation =

South Korean company

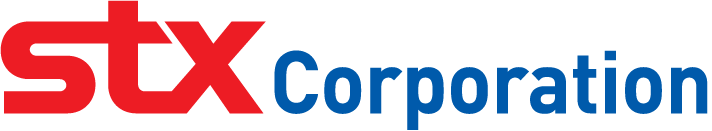
- Company type: Public
- Industry: Heavy equipment
- Founded: 1976; 50 years ago
- Headquarters: Changwon, South Korea
- Key people: Chairman Park Sang-joon
- Products: Trade
- Total assets: US$23 billion (2008 2Q)
- Number of employees: 44,000 (STX Total) 2008; 20,000 (STX Europe)
- Subsidiaries: STX Marine Service; STX Resort
- Website: STX Corporation

STX Corporation is a South Korean company that provides trading services and is publicly held. The company operates through two divisions: trade and ship maintenance. Its trade division deals with shipping and energy materials such as coal, oil, and steel. The ship maintenance division offers services such as cargo management, marine technical, insurance, crew management, and other related services. The headquarters of STX Corporation is located in Gyeongsangnamdo, South Korea.

The company is founded in 1976 as Ssangyong Heavy Industries Co., Ltd., an affiliate of the Ssangyong Group. Following the Asian financial crisis, the company changed its name to STX Co., Ltd. in May 2001.

The company had five local subsidiaries including STX Offshore & Shipbuilding, STX Engine, STX Heavy Industries, STX PanOcean and STX Energy.

Three of them were acquired and renamed in the first three years under the direction of founder Kang Duk-soo. In 2007, STX acquired Europe's largest shipbuilder, Aker Yards.

As of 2009, STX Offshore & Shipbuilding was the world's fourth largest shipbuilder.

== STX business areas ==
- Trading business
