= Erika Blumenfeld =

American transdisciplinary artist, writer, and researcher

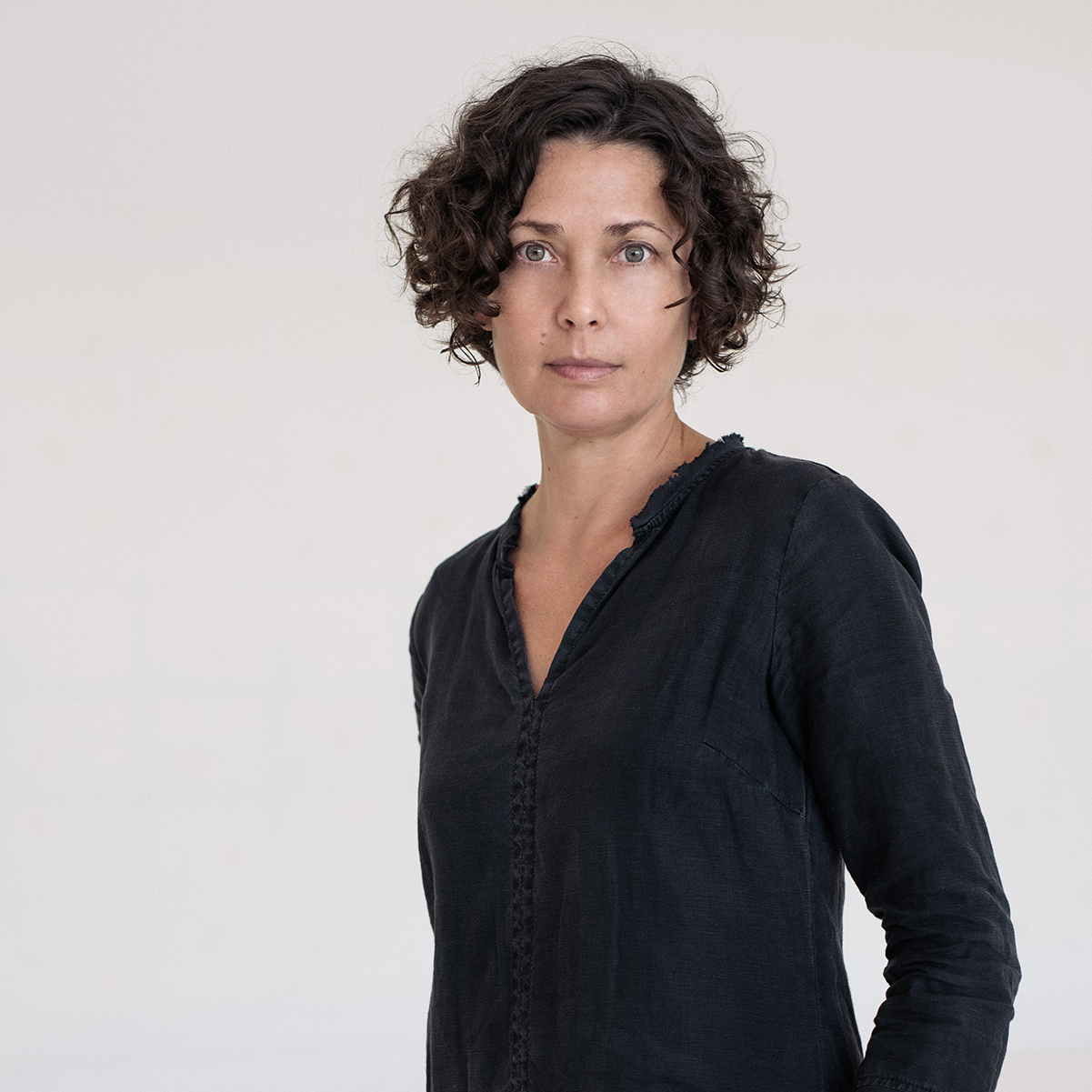
- Born: 1971 (age 54–55); Newark, New Jersey, U.S.
- Education: University College London; Parsons School of Design; Northfield Mount Hermon School
- Known for: Art; Transdisciplinarity; Writing; Research
- Awards: Robert Rauschenberg Foundation, 2018; NASA, 2016; Smithsonian Institution, 2015; Cape Farewell, UK, 2011; SANAE IV, 2009; John Simon Guggenheim Memorial Foundation, 2008; Ballroom Marfa, 2004; Creative Capital, 2000; Special Editions Fellowship, 2000
- Website: http://www.erikablumenfeld.com

Erika Blumenfeld (born 1971) is an American transdisciplinary artist, writer, and researcher whose practice is driven by the wonder of natural phenomena, humanity's relationship with the natural world, and the intersections between art, science, nature, and culture. Blumenfeld's artistic inquiries trace and archive the evidence and stories of connection across the cosmos. Blumenfeld is a Guggenheim Fellow, a Smithsonian Fellow, a Creative Capital Awardee and has exhibited her work widely in museums and galleries nationally and internationally since 1994. Since the early 2000s, Blumenfeld has been an artist-in-residence at laboratories, observatories and in extreme environments, collaborating with scientists and research institutions, such as NASA, the Scripps Institution of Oceanography, the South African National Antarctic Program and the McDonald Observatory. Blumenfeld's art practice is described as non-traditional and research-based, where the artist has explored many fields and disciplines, including astronomy, geology, planetary science, ecology, environmental conservation, and cultural heritage. Blumenfeld's research and inquiry have resulted in interdisciplinary artworks in multiple mediums, including interactive 3D computer graphics and 3D modeling, digital media, photography, video art, painting, drawing, sculpture, and writing, which the artist views as the artifacts of her artistic process.

== Early life, education and early career ==
Blumenfeld was born in Newark, New Jersey. Although she moved frequently throughout her childhood, she was raised primarily in the Boston/Cambridge area. Blumenfeld's curiosity for both the arts and the sciences was encouraged with classes in dance, painting, and classical piano as well as her school's science, rocket, and computer clubs. A defining moment looking at another galaxy through a telescope when she was a child ignited her passion for the cosmos. Blumenfeld began focusing her artistic pursuits more seriously in 1988 while in high school at Northfield Mount Hermon School. At that time she was focused on the nature of light through the medium of photography, a subject she would return to throughout her interdisciplinary career. Discussing Blumenfeld's longtime obsession with light, scholar Arden Reed, wrote: "’Light’ was the infant Erika Blumenfeld's first word, as it was literally the last word of Wilhelm von Goethe, another investigator of that phenomenon." Blumenfeld's early black and white photographic abstractions of light and form were first published in the New England Journal of Medicine when she was 19 years old as part of their curated photographic supplementation sections. Early process experimentation led the artist to invent a unique photographic process in her early 20s, then a student of photography at Parsons School of Design, while working with large-format photographic plates and what she describes as "improvised" chemistry. Blumenfeld named her process "Lunatype" for its likeness to the daguerreotype and ambrotype processes of the late 1800s. Blumenfeld completed most of her college coursework between 1990 and 1993, including a year co-attending Parsons Paris and La Sorbonne’s Cours de Langue et de Civilisation Françaises de la Sorbonne in Paris, after which time she left her studies and moved to Santa Fe, New Mexico to begin her career as an artist. Blumenfeld's first solo exhibition in 1994, titled "Into the Looking Glass," premiered her first Lunatypes, a series of self-portraits exploring film noire and mythology. The first museum acquisition of her work, a Lunatype titled "Shattered Illusions," was procured by the Museum of Fine Arts Houston in 1998 under the auspices of then curator Anne Wilkes Tucker. Blumenfeld later completed her coursework and received her Bachelor of Fine Arts (BFA) in Photography from Parsons School of Design in 2006. She went on to earn a Master of Science (MSc) in Conservation Studies (with Distinction) from University College London in 2014 with a thesis on preserving the natural, cultural, tangible, and intangible significance of the dark night sky and our view of the cosmos.

== Work ==
=== Light Recordings (1998–2015) ===
Blumenfeld's series Light Recordings are a series of photo-based and video-based works that are recordings of natural light onto photographic film and digital sensors without the use of a traditional camera or lens. The work documents the pure phenomena of light itself across various atmospheric conditions and astronomical cycles, such as solstices, eclipses, lunar cycles, and the Sun's daily shifting light through the seasons. The exposures are often installed together in series or a grid format to visually chronicle the recorded light phenomena over time.

Blumenfeld developed the Light Recordings process in the winter of 1998, while testing a custom Polaroid film adapter she had built for her 1888 large-format Antony Climax Portrait Camera; the artist kept the lens closed and took an exposure onto a piece of Polaroid film to see if she had any light leaking through her new adapter. The test revealed that she had a light leak, which exposed the film in an arced gradation, a process that Blumenfeld realized distilled photography down to its essential elements: light and light sensitive material, where light was both medium and subject. Blumenfeld describes this as a critical moment in her artistic process, where in the months prior to her discovery she was beginning to feel discontented with the photographic medium, realizing that the "photograph of a thing is not the thing itself". Her discovery of the Light Recordings process altered the direction of her work, coalescing formal, technical and philosophical progressions in her methodologies, and bringing forth both a conceptual and scientific focus that has been prevalent in her work since. The artist continued to build her own recording devices, which she describes as like a camera obscura, but one which disregards optical mathematics used to achieve proper focal length. The Light Recordings work spans the first twenty years of Blumenfeld's career and has been exhibited in museums in the U.S. and abroad, including the Tate Modern, Albright Knox Art Gallery, Nevada Museum of Art, Kunstnernes Hus, and the International Film Festival Rotterdam.

In 2001, art historian and critic Sue Taylor wrote in Art in America that Blumenfeld's Light Recordings were "a serendipitous discovery" that could be likened to other lensless photographic processes such as the photogram or cliché-verre. Describing the artist's first major museum exhibition, Taylor wrote, "For all its sheer facticity and its reduction of photography (almost) to litmus paper, this work can nevertheless inflict that pang Roland Barthes associated with the punctum. The real punctum of a photograph, Barthes knew, is time—corrosive and mortal—and Blumenfeld’s fleeting moments of light show us this stark truth anew".

In 2004, Blumenfeld was offered an artist-in-residence at the McDonald Observatory to image a full lunar cycle from new moon to new moon through an altered telescope, producing her first video installation, Moving Light: Lunation 1011, which has been exhibited widely including Tate Modern. Scholar and author Arden Reed wrote that in her Light Recordings work "[…] Blumenfeld has photographed nothing but natural phenomena... her project renounces the manipulation of the artist and the mediation of a lens—two things that have been central to photography from its inception. By banishing style or "self-expression" and by suspending the editing work of the lens Blumenfeld exposes light directly to the recording surface, the tabula rasa. This is radical empiricism."

Blumenfeld's Light Recordings are described as being reminiscent of Minimalism, Op art and the Light and Space movement, although art critic John Zotos says: "[...]this work operates in the area that sits between the artist and object at a kind of remove as no visible trace of the artist's identity seems to come through. This is exactly where the work departs from minimalist dogma and the distillation of content into form; Blumenfeld's images are essentially of nature, in a specific place, time and duration; therefore, they are filled with commentary about ecological and environmental issues transformed into a minimalist vocabulary". Art critic Franklin Sirmans states: "While Blumenfeld’s highly inventive strategies for making photographs are thoroughly of this moment, the physical structure of her finished pieces suggests an affinity with the early Minimalists. In particular, her display of grids and serial images bears resemblance to the work of such ‘60s painters and sculptors as Robert Ryman and Donald Judd. Yet Blumenfeld's interest in the grid goes beyond its use as a formal device, entering a realm of latent meaning that Judd and company would never have considered as part of their work". Blumenfeld's Light Recordings have been likened to Mark Rothko’s paintings, Robert Irwin’s early disks, Dan Flavin’s fluorescent light sculptures, and James Turrell’s light works, they have been discussed alongside the work of Olafur Eliasson and Carsten Holler and have been exhibited in the company of Sol LeWitt, Robert Ryman, Josef Albers, and Marcia Hafif. Curator, writer, and critic, Lilly Wei writes that Blumenfeld's work is more "informed by pluralism, hybridization and more syncretic orientations" than the artists the 50s, 60s, and 70s.

=== Bioluminescence series (2001/2011) ===
In 2000, Blumenfeld became interested in working with the phenomena of light in other forms and was particularly inspired by light involved in biological processes. She became curious about working with bioluminescence as a medium and creating a large-scale living installation of bioluminescent marine dinoflagellates. Initial research led her to Marine Biologist Dr. Michael Latz at the Scripps Institution of Oceanography, where he runs a research laboratory and studies bioluminescent organisms in ocean environments. Blumenfeld initiated a dialogue with Latz which culminated in an artist-in-residence at Latz Laboratory in 2001 to learn how to care for the phytoplankton and spend time observing their luminescence. Blumenfeld's artworks in this series explore the bioluminescent dinoflagellate known as Pyrocystis fusiformis which are a bright and larger species of phytoplankton.

Blumenfeld's collaboration with Latz marked her first collaboration with a scientist, her first artist-in-residence at a science institution, and her first deliberate effort to bridge the fields of art and science in her work. Her first works in this series explored working with an aeration system that stimulated the glow of the phytoplankton by bubbles. In her lab testing, she found that when the aeration system was nearly off, producing only one bubble at a time, she could achieve an equilibrium with the organisms, and they would produce a steady glow for a period of time. Her studies produced visualizations of her proposed installation and the first photo-based artworks in this series. Her work also prompted Latz and his research colleagues to further study her single-bubble experiments, which Latz says led to their "quantifying the light production by single bubbles and bubble clouds".

Discussing the wonder of these bioluminescent organisms, Blumenfeld says of her efforts to work across the fields of art and science: "Awe is not academic, but rather, visceral. I believe that awe is the point where art and science meet. Understanding the science brings richness to the experience of the artwork, and also to the experience of our world, but I’m interested in the poetry within the science." Blumenfeld's conceptual interest centered around these organisms’ contribution to planetary health, specifically their being a crucial part of ocean and atmospheric health. Blumenfeld has described her concern for the impact of anthropogenic climate change, industrial toxic waste, and ocean acidification on global phytoplankton populations, with scientific reports then estimating 40% reduction. Her intent is to initiate a public discussion through her work, showing that phytoplankton produce more than 50% of Earth's oxygen and are the base of Earth's food chain. She believes that phytoplankton are essential to the planet's health despite their seeming disconnection to daily human life.

Blumenfeld was awarded a second artist-in-residence with Latz in 2011 and worked with a flow agitation chamber, which simulates ocean dynamics, to investigate a large population of Pyrocystis fusiformis consisting of one million organisms, and a small population to attempt to also capture individual cells. This second collaboration resulted in an exhibition in Paris in 2012 called Carbon 12. She spoke on a panel discussion at UNESCO Headquarters that addressed the cultural and scientific contributions that art can have in addressing issues of climate change and environmental issues. Of her work, Blumenfeld states, "While not all phytoplankton are bioluminescent, the ones that are provide a beautiful way to talk about our natural environment and our relationship to it. The beauty of light captures our imagination, our sense of deep awe. That these organisms give light as part of their natural cycle is wondrous and inspiring. That these organisms are also crucial to each breath we take is quite poignant."

=== The Polar Project (Phase 1 2004–2010) ===
In 2004 Blumenfeld turned her focus towards issues of climate change and her growing concern for humanity's relationship with the natural environment. In response to what she saw as humanity's "loss of connection with the natural world that evolved us," she initiated The Polar Project, an ongoing effort to raise awareness of the environments of Antarctica and the Arctic through art. Blumenfeld posited that while melting of the polar regions would cause unprecedented challenges to global populations, most people around the world had little opportunity to experience these regions, and therefore the poles remained out of sight and out of mind. Her goal was to bring a visceral experience of the polar regions to people worldwide through a large-scale audio and visual installation. Blumenfeld hoped The Polar Project would illuminate why "it’s so important that we understand how intrinsic to the whole ecosystem these environments are. What I’m hoping to achieve is a space in which a sensory experience of the Antarctic and the Arctic envelopes the viewer, awakening a sense of wonder and bringing to life a place that most people will never experience directly."

After years of research and development, gathering a team of advisors and sponsors, including Panavision, The Polar Project gained momentum and in 2008, Blumenfeld won the John Simon Guggenheim Memorial Foundation Fellowship for her project, and was also awarded New York Foundation for the Art’s Fiscal Sponsorship. In that same year, Blumenfeld submitted her project to the International Polar Year to connect with other participating research teams, finding particular affinity with Interpolar Transnational Art Science Constellation (ITASC) and their effort to create a fully wind and solar powered mobile research base suitable for polar environments, called ICEPAC (International Catabatic Experimental Platform for Antarctic Culture). She was subsequently invited to be artist-in-residence and team member of ITASC and guest of South African National Antarctic Program (SANAP) during their 47th research season, embarking on the expedition in January 2009 for four weeks at SANAE IV Base and nearly two weeks crossing the Southern Ocean back to South Africa on the polar research vessel, the S.A. Agulhas.

Curator and critic, Alfons Hug, who was the curator for the ICEPAC cultural projects and a team member of the ITASC 2009 expedition with Blumenfeld, noted in an interview that in the early 90s, international concern was focused on the equatorial jungles, but that by 2010, concern had shifted toward the polar regions, and from an artistic vantage point, he said that Blumenfeld was "at the forefront of this change." Hug included Blumenfeld's lyric essay describing the colorful and prismatic quality of light in Antarctica, titled "What is White," in the book Arte Da Antartida/Art From Antarctica, published by the Goethe-Institute in 2009. Blumenfeld's essay has been translated into Portuguese and German, and also appears in the book Klima Kunst Kultur published by Steidl in 2014. Blumenfeld produced multiple photo- and video-based works while in Antarctica, which she describes as botanical and naturalist studies of the complex natural phenomena that occur in Antarctica, and are the initial artworks in advance of the larger The Polar Project installation. These works were exhibited in the first Biennial in Antarctica, as well as in the U.S., Germany, Uruguay, Brazil, and both Ushuaia and Buenos Aires in Argentina

=== NASA Project: Astromaterials 3D (2013–2020) ===
In 2013, Blumenfeld approached NASA with a proposal to create a virtual library of NASA's Apollo Lunar and Antarctic Meteorite collections to make these rare rocks from space more accessible to researchers and the general public. The artist describes her interest in initiating the collaboration with NASA as having arisen out of her research into the cosmochemical stories that are held in rocks from space, leading her to ask: "Might it be possible to hold a rock in one’s hand that told the story of the whole cosmos?" Blumenfeld says she thinks of rocks as "scrolls of knowledge, passed down through the cosmic, planetary and geologic ages, that tell the story of primordial formation" and that it is "through the study of astromaterials that we were finally able to correlate that we are made of stars."

After a two-year period of initial development and feasibility studies at the Astromaterials Research and Exploration Science Division at Johnson Space Center, Blumenfeld, and her team won a 3-year NASA ROSES PDART grant to proceed with creating the project. Blumenfeld is both the Science-Principal Investigator and Project Lead for Astromaterials 3D.

To produce what NASA refers to as "research-grade" 3D model of each rock, Blumenfeld and her team developed a methodology that incorporates three primary technologies: high-resolution precision photography (HRPP), structure-from-motion photogrammetry (SFM), and X-ray computed tomography (XCT). Blumenfeld images each lunar or meteorite sample at 240 to 480 angles in a cleanroom laboratory while the rock remains inside of a nitrogen cabinet. The three technologies, HRPP, SFM, and XCT, culminate within the "Astromaterials 3D Explorer," which is a custom-engineered browser-based software application that the project's website says ingests the exterior (HRPP) texture and interior (XCT) image data and digitally "fuses" them into a single 3-dimensional, interactive, virtual object.

Blumenfeld states, "These rocks have incredibly significant scientific value but they also have real cultural significance as well. This project helps make them more accessible to researchers but also to people beyond the research community." The Astromaterials 3D website and custom web-based Explorer 3D visualization application was launched to the public on December 15, 2020, with 20 rocks, 10 from each of the Apollo Lunar and Antarctic Meteorite collections with additional samples to be added ongoing.

== Selected awards ==
- 2021: Software Award for her Astromaterials 3D (NASA)
- 2018: Robert Rauschenberg Foundation, Artist-in-Residence, Captiva, FL
- 2016: NASA, ROSES PDART Grant, Proposal No.: 15-PDART15_2-0041
- 2015: Smithsonian Institution, Artist Research Fellowship, National Museum of Natural History
- 2011: Cape Farewell, Artist-in-Residence, Scottish Islands Expedition
- 2009: SANAE IV, ITASC Artist-in-Residence & Team Member, Antarctica
- 2008: John Simon Guggenheim Memorial Foundation Fellowship
- 2004: Ballroom Marfa, Inaugural Artist-in Residence
- 2000: Creative Capital Foundation Award
- 2000: Special Editions Fellowship, Lower East Side Printshop

== Selected solo exhibitions ==
- 2018, Erika Blumenfeld: Encyclopedia of Trajectories, Rice Public Art, Rice University, Houston, TX
- 2013, Water, water every where…, Women & Their Work, Austin, TX
- 2010, Moving Light, Nevada Museum of Art, Reno, NV
- 2010, Moving Light: Lunation 1011, TATE Modern, London, UK (Presented by Ballroom Marfa)
- 2009, Moving Light: Spring, Fusebox Festival, Salvage-Vanguard Theater, Austin, TX
- 2007, Erika Blumenfeld: The Intention of Light, International Film Festival Rotterdam, Willem de Kooning Academie, BLAAK 10 Galerie, Netherlands
- 2005, Light Phenomena, Center for Contemporary Arts, Santa Fe, NM
- 2005, Lunation 1011, Ballroom, Marfa, TX
- 2004, Inconstant Moon, DiverseWorks Art Space, Houston, TX
- 2001, Moments of Light, Portland Institute for Contemporary Art, Portland, OR

== Selected public collections ==
- Albright Knox Art Gallery, Buffalo, NY
- Lannan Foundation, Santa Fe, NM & Marfa, TX
- Lower East Side Print Shop, New York, NY
- Museum of Fine Arts Houston, TX
- New Mexico Museum of Art, Santa Fe, NM
- Scottsdale Museum of Contemporary Art, Scottsdale, AZ
- University College London, Doha, Qatar
- University of Texas at Austin, TX (McDonald Observatory Collection)

== Selected books ==
- 2016, Przbyto-Ibadullajev, Marta (Ed.). LUX. Essay by Jorg Colberg. Warsaw, Poland: Archeology of Photography Foundation.
- 2014, Zell, Andrea and Johannes Ebert, eds. Klima Kunst Kultur. Göttingen, Germany: Steidl.
- 2014, Brown, Andrew. Art & Ecology Now. New York, NY. Thames & Hudson.
- 2012, Buckland, David and Alanna Mitchell. Carbon 12: Art and Climate Change. Paris, France: Somogy Edition D’Art, Espace Fondation EDF, Cape Farewell.
- 2010, Sbarge, Suzanne, Bill Gillbert, Lucy Lippard, William L. Fox, Nancy Marie Mithlo and MaLin Wilson-Powell. Land/Art New Mexico. Santa Fe, New Mexico: Radius Books.
- 2009, Hug, Alfons, Ilija Trojanow, Mirko Bonne and Erika Blumenfeld. Arte Da Antartida (Art from Antarctica). Rio de Janeiro, Brazil: Ed. Aeroplano. Goethe-Institut Rio de Janeiro.
- 2008, Barrow, Thomas, Stuart Ashman and Kristin Barendsen. Photography: New Mexico. Albuquerque, New Mexico: Fresco Fine Art Publications.
- 2008, Crist, Steve, ed. The Polaroid Book. Essay by Barbara Hitchcock. Cologne, Germany: Taschen.
- 2008 Wei, Lilly and Louis Grachos. The Natalie & Irving Forman Collection: Works on Paper. Buffalo, New York: Albright-Knox Art Gallery.
- 2005, Wei, Lilly and Louis Grachos. The Natalie & Irving Forman Collection: Painting & Sculpture. Buffalo, New York: Albright-Knox Art Gallery.
- 2005, Crist, Steve, ed. The Polaroid Book. Essay by Barbara Hitchcock. Cologne, Germany: Taschen.

== Selected Scientific Publications ==
- Blumenfeld, E. H., Beaulieu, K. R., Thomas, A. B., Evans, C. A., Zeigler, R. A., Oshel, E. R., Liddle, D. A., Righter, K., Hanna, R. D., and Ketcham, R. A. (2019) 3D Virtual Astromaterials Samples Collection of NASA's Apollo Lunar and Antarctic Meteorite Samples to be an Online Database to Serve Researchers and the Public. 50th Lunar and Planetary Science Conference 2019.
- Beaulieu, K. R., Blumenfeld, E. H., Thomas, A. B., Evans, C. A., Zeigler, R. A., Oshel, E. R., Liddle, D. A., Righter, K., Hanna, R. D., and Ketcham, R. A. (2019) Visualization of Fused Structure-From-Motion and Micro X-Ray Computed Tomography Data Sets for Novel 3D Virtual Astromaterials Samples Collection of NASA's Apollo Lunar and Meteorite Samples. 50th Lunar and Planetary Science Conference 2019.
- Blumenfeld, E. H., Beaulieu, K. R., Thomas, A. B. H., Evans, C. A., Zeigler, R. A., Oshel, E. R., Liddle, D. A., Righter, K., Hanna, R. D., and Ketcham, R. A. (2018) Creating a High-Resolution 3D Virtual Astromaterials Samples Collection of NASA's Apollo Lunar Samples and Antarctic Meteorite Collections for an Online Database to Serve Researchers and the Public. 100th AGU Fall Meeting 2018.
- Blumenfeld, E. H., Evans, C. A., Oshel, E. R., Liddle, D. A., Beaulieu, K., Zeigler, R. A., Hanna, R. D., and Ketcham, R. A. (2017) Research-Grade 3D Virtual Astromaterials Samples: Novel Visualization of NASA's Apollo Lunar Samples and Antarctic Meteorite Samples to Benefit Curation, Research, and Education. 48th Lunar and Planetary Science Conference 2017.
- Beaulieu, K., Blumenfeld, E. H., Liddle, D. A., Oshel, E. R., Evans, C. A., Zeigler, R. A., Righter, K., Hanna, R. D., and Ketcham, R. A. (2017) Structure-From-Motion Photogrammetry and Micro X-Ray Computed Tomography 3-D Reconstruction Data Fusion for Non-Destructive Conservation Documentation of Lunar Samples. 48th Lunar and Planetary Science Conference 2017.
- Blumenfeld, E. H., Evans, C. A., Zeigler, R. A., Righter, K., Beaulieu, K., Oshel, E. R., Liddle, D. A., Hanna, R. D., and Ketcham, R. A., Todd, N. S. (2016) An Interdisciplinary Method for the Visualization of Novel High-Resolution Precision Photography and Micro-XCT Data Sets of NASA's Apollo Lunar Samples and Antarctic Meteorite Samples to Create Combined Research-Grade 3D Virtual Samples for the Benefit of Astromaterials Collections Conservation, Curation, Scientific Research and Education. 98th AGU Fall Meeting 2016.
- Blumenfeld, E. H., Evans, C. A., Oshel, E. R., Liddle, D. A., Beaulieu, K., Zeigler, R. A., Hanna, R. D., and Ketcham, R. A. (2015) Comprehensive Non-Destructive Conservation Documentation of Lunar Samples Using High-Resolution Image-Based 3D Reconstructions and X-Ray CT Data. 46th Lunar and Planetary Science Conference 2015.
- Blumenfeld, E. H., Evans, C. A., Oshel, E. R., Liddle, D. A., Beaulieu, K., Zeigler, R. A., Hanna, R. D., and Ketcham, R. A. (2014) High-resolution imaged-based 3d reconstruction combined with X-Ray CT data enables comprehensive non-destructive documentation and targeted research of astromaterials. 77th Annual Meeting of The Meteoritical Society 2014.
