= SANAE =

South African National Antarctic Expedition

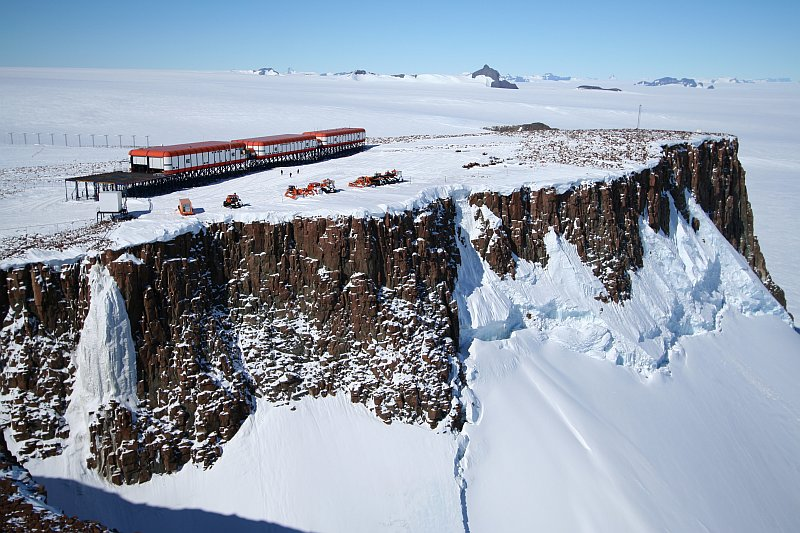
SANAE IV

SANAE is the South African National Antarctic Expedition. The name refers both to the overwintering bases (numbered in Roman numerals, e.g. SANAE IV), and the team spending the winter (numbered in Arabic numerals, e.g. SANAE 47). The current base, SANAE IV, is located at Vesleskarvet in Queen Maud Land, Antarctica. Summer teams comprise administrative and maintenance personnel, helicopter crew and scientists from various countries and can be up to 100 people. Overwintering teams consist of scientists and support personnel from South Africa, typically totalling 10 members in recent years.

The research programme at the SANAE IV base is carried out under the auspices of the South African National Antarctic Programme (SANAP).

== History ==
SANAE I, II and III
- Antarctic research station
- Last location in Antarctica
- Coordinates: 70°17′54″S 2°25′34″W
- Region: Queen Maud Land
- Location: Near Blåskimen Island

Government
  - Type: Administration
  - Body: SANAP, South Africa
- Active times: All year-round

SANAE I
- Interactive map of SANAE I
- Established: 1962
- Closed: 1963

SANAE II
- Interactive map of SANAE II
- Established: 1971
- Closed: 1979

SANAE III
- Interactive map of SANAE III
- Established: 1979
- Closed: 1997

The first expedition, SANAE 1, overwintered at Norway Station, taken over by South Africa from Norway after the end of the IGY. Later teams overwintered at SANAE I, SANAE II and SANAE III, built on the Fimbul Ice Shelf near the Blåskimen Island. Built on the moving ice shelf, these stations inevitably got buried, and eventually broke off as part of icebergs drifting away. Successive stations were always repositioned at the same geographical position of 70°19′00″S 2°21′00″W. SANAE IV was built on the nunatak Vesleskarvet in the hope of having a base with a longer lifetime. The first team to overwinter at SANAE IV was SANAE 36 in 1997. The base has been staffed uninterruptedly since then.

Other expeditions also established Borga Base and Sarie Marais Field Base.

== See also ==
- Crime in Antarctica
- South African National Antarctic Programme
- Gough Island
- Marion Island
- SA Agulhas
- SA Agulhas II
- List of Antarctic expeditions
