= SANAP =

SANAP may refer to:

- South African National Antarctic Programme
- Sabah Chinese Association, known in the early 1960s as the Sabah National Party
