= Knerten Rock =

Small rock formation in Queen Maud Land, Antarctica

- Location within Antarctica

Geography
- Location: Queen Maud Land, Antarctica
- Parent range: Ahlmann Ridge

Geology
- Mountain type: Rock formation

Knerten Rock (71°33′S 2°52′W) is a small isolated rock 7 nautical miles (13 km) north of Vesleskarvet Cliff, in the northwest part of Ahlmann Ridge in Queen Maud Land, Antarctica. It was mapped by Norwegian cartographers from surveys and air photos by the Norwegian–British–Swedish Antarctic Expedition (NBSAE) (1949–52) and air photos by the Norwegian expedition (1958–59) and named Knerten (the nipper).
