= Blåskimen Island =

Ice-covered island near Antarctica

- Location within Antarctica

Geography
- Location: Antarctica
- Coordinates: 70°25′S 3°0′W
- Highest elevation: 300 m (1000 ft)

Administration
- Administered under the Antarctic Treaty System

Demographics
- Population: Uninhabited

Blåskimen Island is a high, ice-covered island about 15 kilometres (8 nmi) north of Novyy Island, at the juncture of the Jelbart Ice Shelf and the Fimbul Ice Shelf, Queen Maud Land. The island rises about 300 metres (1,000 ft) above the general level of the ice shelf and is surrounded by this ice, except for the north side which borders the sea. The feature was roughly delineated by Norwegian cartographers working with air photos taken by the Norwegian–British–Swedish Antarctic Expedition in 1951–52 and the Sixth Norwegian Antarctic Expedition in 1958–59. They called the island Blåskimen and included the area now called Novyy Island. The Soviet Antarctic Expedition mapped the feature in 1961 and showed it to be separated from Novyy Island.

== See also ==
- List of antarctic and sub-antarctic islands
