= S. A. Agulhas =

South African ice-strengthened training ship and former polar research vessel

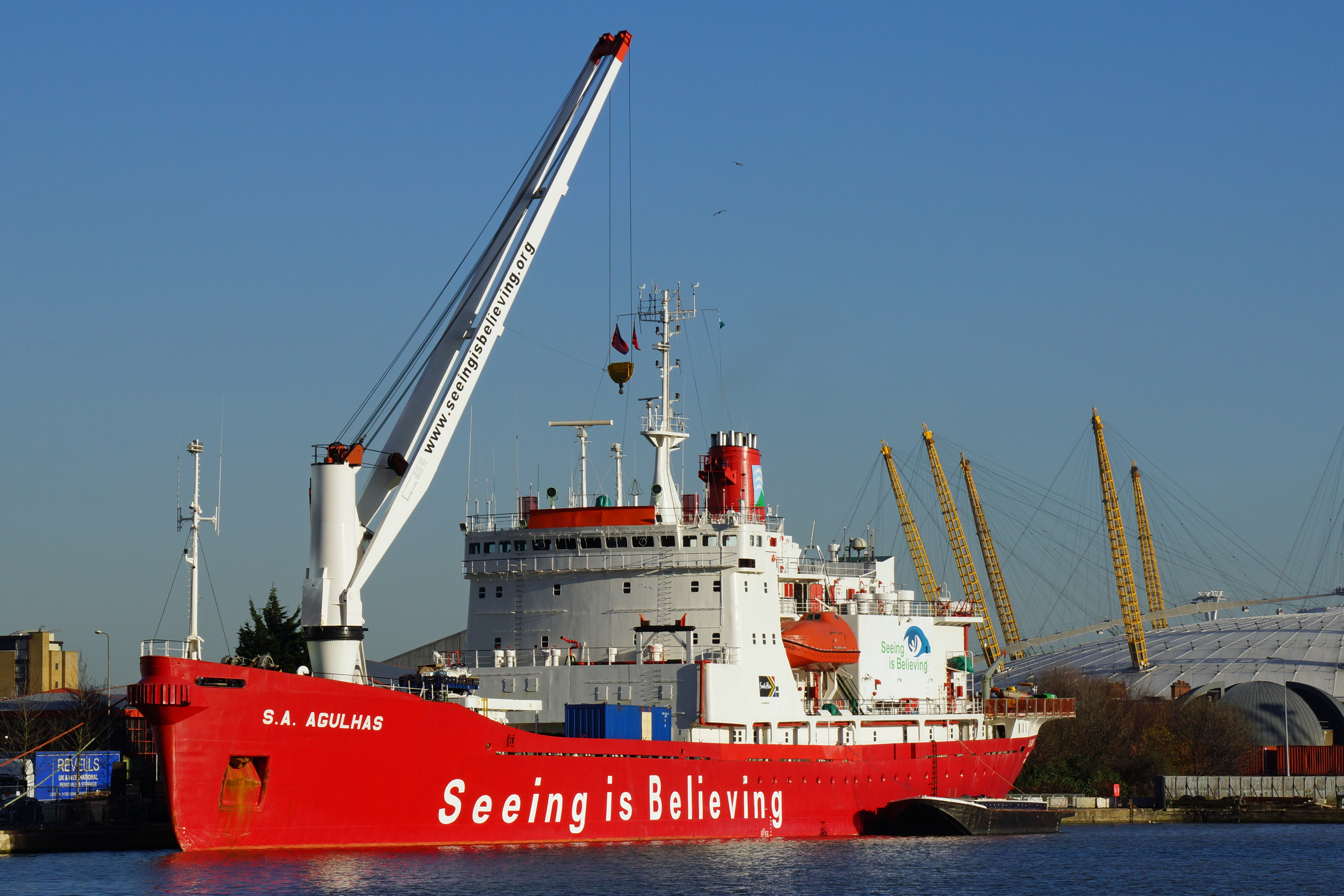

History

South Africa
- Name: S. A. Agulhas
- Builder: Mitsubishi Heavy Industries, Shimonoseki
- Yard number: 789
- Laid down: 1977
- Launched: 20 September 1977
- Completed: January 1978
- Identification: IMO number: 7628136; MMSI number: 601048000; Callsign: ZSAF
- Fate: Broken up

General characteristics
- Tonnage: 6,123 long tons (6,221 t)
- Displacement: 1,837 long tons (1,866 t)tons
- Length: 111.95 m (367.3 ft)
- Beam: 18.05 m (59.2 ft)
- Draught: 6 m (20 ft)
- Installed power: 2 × Mirrlees Blackstone KMR6; 4,476 kW (6,002 hp)
- Speed: 12.5 knots (23.2 km/h; 14.4 mph) (Cruise); 14 knots (26 km/h; 16 mph) (Max)
- Range: 15,000 nmi (28,000 km; 17,000 mi)
- Endurance: 90 days
- Complement: 138
- Crew: 40
- Aircraft carried: 2 × Atlas Oryx

S. A. Agulhas was a South African ice-strengthened training ship and former polar research vessel. She was built by Mitsubishi Heavy Industries in Shimonoseki, Japan, in 1978. S. A. Agulhas was used to service the three South African National Antarctic Programme research bases, Gough Island, Marion Island in the Southern Ocean and SANAE IV in Antarctica, as well as various research voyages.

S. A. Agulhas retired from Antarctic service in April 2012 when the replacement vessel, S. A. Agulhas II, was commissioned. She was transferred to the South African Maritime Safety Authority (SAMSA) as a training ship.

The ship was sold for scrap in 2026.

== History ==
=== Rudder damage ===
In December 1991, S. A. Agulhas suffered rudder damage while in the Antarctic, seen as karmic revenge for refusing to take Michael Palin to Antarctica at the end of Pole to Pole with Michael Palin. The German icebreaker Polarstern assisted her and by February 1992 S. A. Agulhas had been freed from the pack ice. Once freed, the SAS Drakensberg towed the stricken vessel back to Cape Town for repairs.

=== Rescue of the Magdalena Oldendorff ===
S. A. Agulhas participated in a multinational rescue of Magdalena Oldendorff in 2002. The ice-strengthened cargo ship had become stuck in the ice during severe weather conditions while en route from a Russian Antarctic base to Cape Town. S. A. Agulhas and the Argentine icebreaker Almirante Irízar were dispatched to render assistance. On 27 June 2002, S. A. Agulhas was 370 kilometres (230 mi) from Magdalena Oldendorff, close enough for its two Oryx helicopters, operated by 22 Squadron, to reach the stricken vessel. By 1 June the Oryx had transferred 89 Russian Antarctic expedition members and Magdalena Oldendorff crew members to S. A. Agulhas and have transferred 2,000 kilograms (4,400 lb) of supplies to the remaining crew. The crew remaining on Magdalena Oldendorff were to await the arrival of Almirante Irizar and attempt to free the ship.

=== Deaths at sea ===
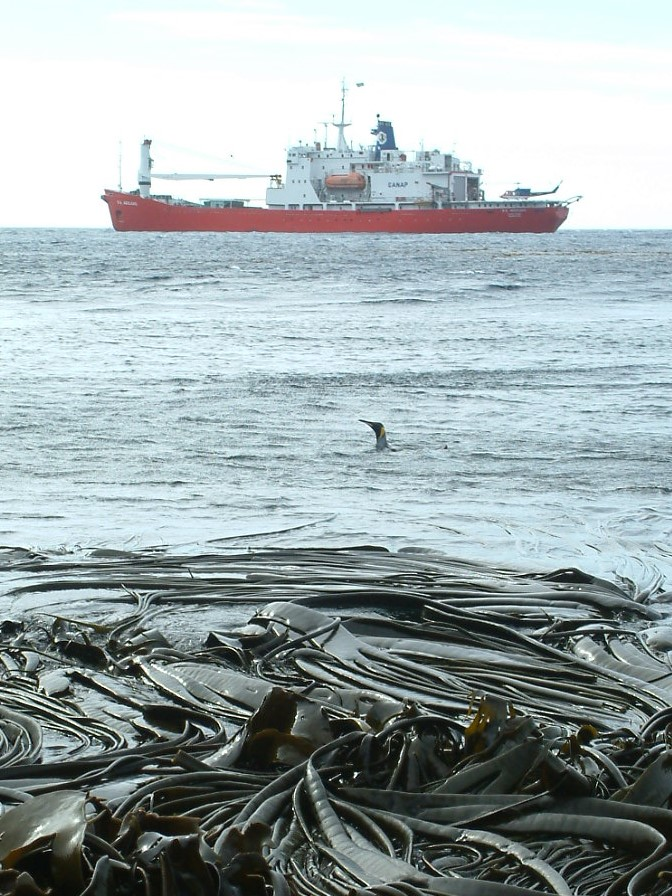
S.A. Agulhas in 2007 with seal, penguin and kelp off Marion Island

On 27 September 2007, Ordinary Seaman Edward Hudley was stabbed and killed while S. A. Agulhas was near Gough Island. Two crew members were accused of murder. The environmental protection vessel Sarah Baartman was dispatched and took custody of the two accused and the deceased's body on 3 October 2007. Both accused were charged with murder on arrival in Cape Town, but all charges were dropped on 6 April 2009.

On the ship's first ever voyage to Marion Island, a member of the crew was killed by another crew member, using a fire axe. On arrival back in Cape Town, the suspected killer could not be found on board the vessel. It was speculated that he jumped over the side of the vessel before arrival in Cape Town.

== Mission ==
The mission of S. A. Agulhas included regular visits to South Africa's base on Antarctica, and to research stations on Gough Island and Marion Island.

== Retirement from polar mission and new role ==
S. A. Agulhas retired from polar supply missions in March 2012, when its replacement, S. A. Agulhas II, arrived. The Oceans and Coasts Branch of the Department of Environmental Affairs announced in 2011 that several other government agencies had requested the vessel's transfer, noting that, unlike the new vessel, the first was not designed to carry out scientific research, just icebreaking and that the capability to perform scientific research had been added later. It was also reported that the vessel could be insured for a further two years.

In July 2012 the S. A. Agulhas was recommissioned as a training ship operated by the South African Maritime Safety Authority, the ship will continue to provide facilities for scientific research while training up to seventy merchant marine cadets.

Having undertaken a brief "shakedown" cruise from 4 July 2012, the ship left Cape Town on 2 November 2012 on the first full cruise as a training vessel. Included in the itinerary were visits to Tema and Abidjan to take on additional cadets from Cameroon, Gambia, Ghana and Côte d'Ivoire, while en route to London, UK. After returning to Cape Town, the ship then visited Antarctica. During the cruise various scientific experiments and observations were completed for the Council for Scientific and Industrial Research and the Departments of Science and Technology and Environmental Affairs. In 2013, the vessel delivered The Coldest Journey team, which was an Antarctica winter crossing expedition led by Sir Ranulph Fiennes in support of the charity "Seeing is Believing".

== See also ==
- S. A. Agulhas II – Icebreaking polar supply and research ship
- South African National Antarctic Programme – Government research programme
- SANAE – South African National Antarctic Expedition
- Gough Island – Island in the South Atlantic
- Marion Island – The larger of the Prince Edward Islands
