= SuperDARN =

International collaboration to study the ionosphere

- Super Dual Auroral Radar Network
- Established: 1993; 33 years ago
- Affiliations: (Australia) La Trobe University (Canada) University of Saskatchewan (China) NSSC, CAS (China) PRIC (France) IRAP (United Kingdom) British Antarctic Survey (United Kingdom) University of Leicester (United Kingdom) Lancaster University (Italy) INAF (Japan) Nagoya University (Japan) NICT (Japan) NIPR (Norway) UNIS (South Africa) SANSA (South Africa) University of KwaZulu-Natal (United States) Virginia Tech (United States) Applied Physics Laboratory (United States) Dartmouth College (United States) Penn State

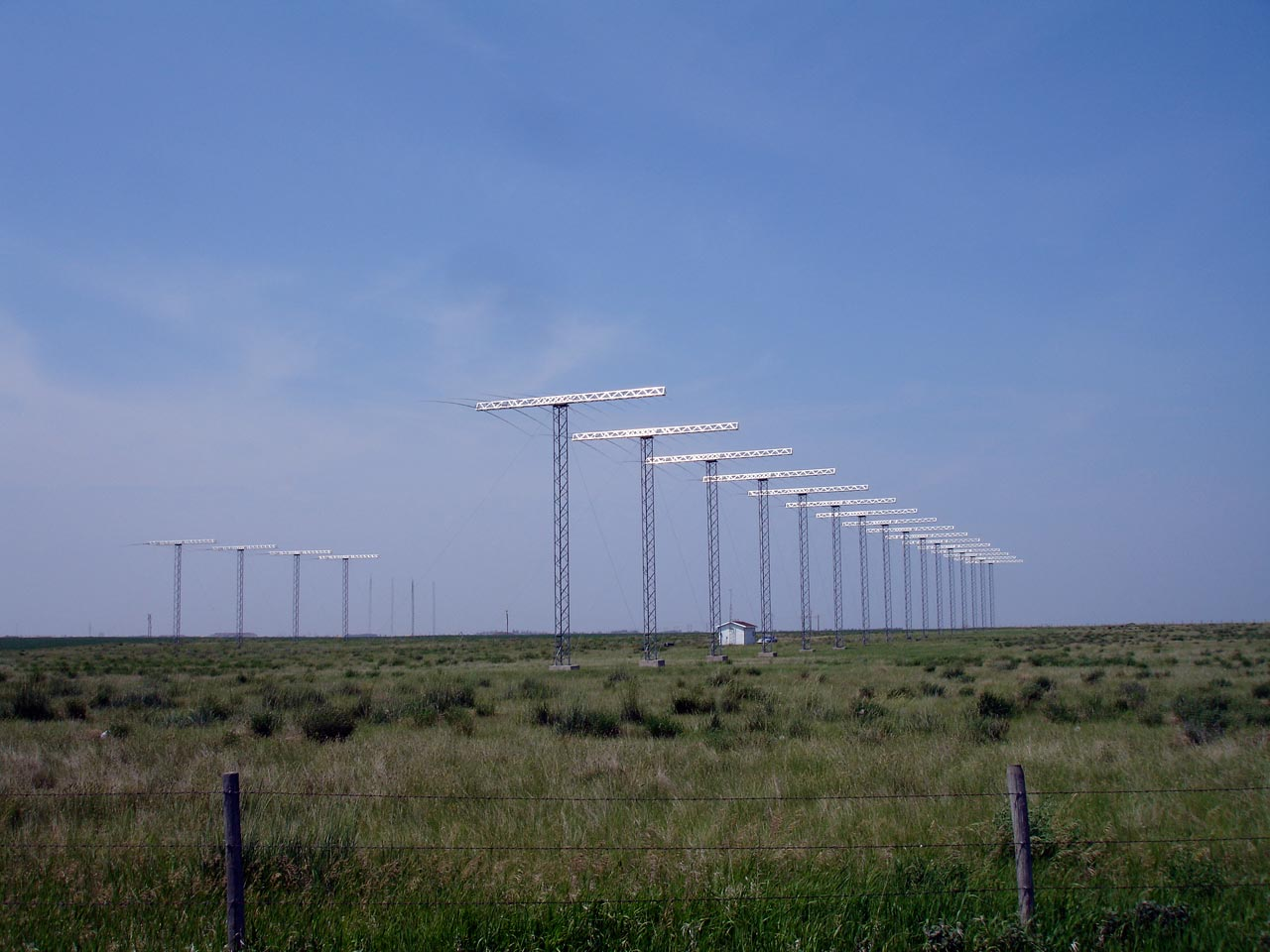
A SuperDARN radar site located in Saskatoon, Canada

The Super Dual Auroral Radar Network (SuperDARN) is an international scientific radar network consisting of 41 high frequency (HF) radars located in both the Northern and Southern Hemispheres. SuperDARN radars are primarily used to map high-latitude plasma convection in the F region of the ionosphere, but the radars are also used to study a wider range of geospace phenomena including field aligned currents, magnetic reconnection, geomagnetic storms and substorms, magnetospheric MHD waves, mesospheric winds via meteor ionization trails, and interhemispheric plasma convection asymmetries.

The SuperDARN collaboration is composed of radars operated by JHU/APL, Virginia Tech, Dartmouth College, the Geophysical Institute at the University of Alaska Fairbanks, the Institute of Space and Atmospheric Studies at the University of Saskatchewan, the University of Leicester, Lancaster University, La Trobe University, the Solar-Terrestrial Environment Laboratory at Nagoya University, the British Antarctic Survey and the Institute for Space Astrophysics and Planetology (INAF-IAPS Italy).

== History ==
In the 1970s and 1980s, the Scandinavian Twin Auroral Radar Experiment (STARE) very high frequency (VHF) coherent scatter radars were used to study field aligned E region ionospheric irregularities. Using two radars with overlapping fields of view, it was possible to determine the 2D velocity vector of E region ionospheric plasma flow. However, irregularities were only observed when the radar wavevector was perpendicular to the magnetic field in the scattering region.

This meant that there was a problem with operating at VHF since VHF frequencies don't allow for very much refraction of the transmitted radar wave vector; thus, the perpendicularity requirement could not be easily met at high latitudes. At HF frequencies, however, refraction of the radar wave vector is greater, and this allows for the perpendicularity requirement to be met at high latitudes. Refraction of radio waves in the ionosphere is a complicated non-linear phenomenon governed by the Appleton–Hartree equation.

In 1983, a steerable-beam HF radar with 16 log-periodic antennas began operations at Goose Bay, Labrador, Canada. Comparing measurements of F region ionospheric plasma velocity from the Goose Bay radar with the Sondestrom Incoherent Scatter Radar revealed that the Goose Bay radar was capable of measuring the F region plasma convection velocity. A magnetically conjugate radar was constructed in Antarctica at Halley Research Station in 1988 as part of the Polar Anglo–American Conjugate Experiment (PACE). PACE provided simultaneous conjugate studies of ionospheric and magnetospheric phenomena.

From PACE, which was only able to determine a single component of the 2D ionospheric velocity, it became apparent that determining the 2D ionospheric velocity would be advantageous. Combining velocity measurements from Goose Bay with a second coherent-scatter radar in Schefferville in 1989 allowed for a 2D determination of the F region ionospheric velocity.

This work led to SuperDARN, a network of HF radars with pairs of radars having overlapping fields of view. This arrangement allowed for the determination of the full 2D ionospheric plasma convection velocity. Due to the advancement of data assimilation models, radars recently added to the network do not necessarily have overlapping fields of view. Using data from all SuperDARN radars in the northern or southern hemisphere, an ionospheric plasma convection pattern—a map of high-latitude plasma velocity at F region altitudes (300 km)—can be determined.

=== Primary goals ===
The primary goals of SuperDARN are to determine or study:

- Structure of global convection—to provide a global-scale view of the configuration of plasma convection in the high-latitude ionosphere
- Dynamics of global convection—to provide a global-scale view of the dynamics of plasma convection in the high-latitude ionosphere. (Previous studies of high-latitude convection had largely been statistical and time-averaged)
- Substorms—to test various theories of polar cap expansion and contraction under changing IMF conditions and observe the large-scale response of the nightside; convection pattern to substorms
- Signatures of atmospheric gravity waves in the ionosphere
- High-latitude plasma structures
- Ionospheric irregularities

== Operations ==
SuperDARN radars operate in the HF band between 8.0 MHz (37 m) and 22.0 MHz (14 m). In the standard operating mode each radar scans through 16 beams of azimuthal separation of ~3.24°, with a scan taking 1 min to complete (~3 seconds integration per beam).

Each beam is divided into 75 (or 100) range gates each 45 km in distance, and so in each full scan the radars each cover 52° in azimuth and over 3000 km in range; an area encompassing the order of 1 million square km.

The radars measure the Doppler velocity (and other related characteristics) of plasma density irregularities in the ionosphere.

Since Linux became popular, it has become the default operating system for the SuperDARN network. The operating system (superdarn-ros.3.6) is currently licensed under the LGPL).

== SuperDARN sites ==
The following is a list of SuperDARN sites, based on a list maintained by Virginia Tech College of Engineering.

As of 2009, an expansion project was underway for expanding the network into the middle latitudes, including the addition of sites in Hays, Kansas (near Fort Hays State University), Oregon, and the Azores, in order to support mapping outside of the auroral regions during large magnetic storms.

Decommissioned

Name	Code	Location	Coordinates	Boresight Heading	PI Institute
Northern Hemisphere
Adak Island East	ade	(United States) Adak Island, Alaska	51.8929°N 176.6285°W	46.0°	(United States) Penn State
Adak Island West	adw	(United States) Adak Island, Alaska	51.8931°N 176.6310°W	−28.0°	(United States) Penn State
Blackstone	bks	(United States) Blackstone, Virginia	37.1019°N 77.9502°W	-40.0°	(United States) Virginia Tech
Christmas Valley East	cve	(United States) Christmas Valley, Oregon	43.2703°N 120.3567°W	54.0°	(United States) Dartmouth College
Christmas Valley West	cvw	(United States) Christmas Valley, Oregon	43.2707°N 120.3585°W	−20.0°	(United States) Dartmouth College
Clyde River	cly	(Canada) Clyde River, Nunavut	70.4867°N 68.5037°W	−55.6°	(Canada) University of Saskatchewan
Fort Hays East	fhe	(United States) Hays, Kansas	38.8585°N 99.3886°W	45.0°	(United States) Virginia Tech
Fort Hays West	fhw	(United States) Hays, Kansas	38.8588°N 99.3904°W	−25.0°	(United States) Virginia Tech
Goose Bay	gbr	(Canada) Goose Bay, Newfoundland and Labrador	53.3179°N 60.4642°W	5.0°	(United States) Virginia Tech
Hankasalmi	han	(Finland) Hankasalmi	62.3140°N 26.6054°E	−12.0°	(United Kingdom) University of Leicester
Hejing East	hje	(China) Hejing, Xinjiang	42.885°N 83.709°E	39.0°	(China) NSSC, CAS
Hejing West	hjw	(China) Hejing, Xinjiang	42.885°N 83.709°E	-39.0°	(China) NSSC, CAS
Hokkaido East	hok	(Japan) Rikubetsu, Hokkaido	43.5318°N 143.6144°E	25.0°	(Japan) Nagoya University
Hokkaido West	hkw	(Japan) Rikubetsu, Hokkaido	43.5372°N 143.6075°E	−30.0°	(Japan) Nagoya University
Iceland East	ice	(Iceland) Þykkvibær	63.7744°N 20.5416°W	23.0°	(United States) Dartmouth College
Iceland West	icw	(Iceland) Þykkvibær	63.7740°N 20.5458°W	-52.0°	(United States) Dartmouth College
Inuvik	inv	(Canada) Inuvik, Northwest Territories	68.4129°N 133.7690°W	26.4°	(Canada) University of Saskatchewan
Jiamusi East	jme	(China) Jiamusi, Heilongjiang	46.7666°N 130.4859°E	44.0°	(China) NSSC, CAS
Kapuskasing	kap	(Canada) Kapuskasing, Ontario	49.3929°N 82.3219°W	−12.0°	(United States) Virginia Tech
King Salmon	ksr	(United States) King Salmon, Alaska	58.6918°N 156.6588°W	−20.0°	(United States) Penn State
Kodiak	kod	(United States) Kodiak, Alaska	57.6119°N 152.1914°W	30.0°	(United States) Penn State
Longjing East	lje	(China) Longjing, Jilin	42.8241°N 129.4224°E	44.0°	(China) NSSC, CAS
Longjing West	ljw	(China) Longjing, Jilin	42.8267°N 129.4178°E	-34.0°	(China) NSSC, CAS
Longyearbyen	lyr	(Norway) Longyearbyen, Svalbard	78.1535°N 16.0607°E	23.7°	(Norway) UNIS
Þykkvibær	pyk	(Iceland) Þykkvibær	63.7728°N 20.5445°W	30.0°	(United Kingdom) University of Leicester
Prince George	pgr	(Canada) Prince George, British Columbia	53.9812°N 122.5920°W	−5.0°	(Canada) University of Saskatchewan
Rankin Inlet	rkn	(Canada) Rankin Inlet, Nunavut	62.8281°N 92.1130°W	5.7°	(Canada) University of Saskatchewan
Saskatoon	sas	(Canada) Saskatoon, Saskatchewan	52.1572°N 106.5305°W	23.1°	(Canada) University of Saskatchewan
Schefferville	sch	(Canada) Schefferville, Quebec	54.8°N 66.8°W	15.0°	(France) CNRS/LPCE
Siziwang East	sze	(China) Siziwang, Inner Mongolia	41.8327°N 111.9337°E	42.0°	(China) NSSC, CAS
Siziwang West	szw	(China) Siziwang, Inner Mongolia	41.8327°N 111.9309°E	-36.0°	(China) NSSC, CAS
Stokkseyri	sto	(Iceland) Stokkseyri	63.8603°N 21.0310°W	−59.0°	(United Kingdom) Lancaster University
Wallops Island	wal	(United States) Wallops Island, Virginia	37.8576°N 75.5099°W	35.9°	(United States) Applied Physics Laboratory
Southern Hemisphere
Name	Code	Location	Coordinates	Boresight Heading	PI Institute
Buckland Park	bpk	Buckland Park, South Australia	34.6270°S 138.4658°E	146.5°	(Australia) La Trobe University
Dome C East	dce	(Antarctica) Concordia Station	75.090°S 123.350°E	115.0°	(Italy) INAF
Dome C North	dcn	(Antarctica) Concordia Station	75.086°S 123.3597°E	-28.0°	(Italy) INAF
Falkland Islands	fir	Falkland Islands	51.8314°S 58.9793°W	178.3°	(United Kingdom) British Antarctic Survey
Halley^{*}	hal	(Antarctica) Halley Research Station	75.6200°S 26.2192°W	165.0°	(United Kingdom) British Antarctic Survey
Kerguelen	ker	(French Southern and Antarctic Lands) Kerguelen Islands	49.3507°S 70.2665°E	168.0°	(France) IRAP/CNRS/IPEV
McMurdo	mcm	(Antarctica) McMurdo Station	77.8376°S 166.6559°E	300.0°	(United States) Penn State
SANAE^{*}	san	(Antarctica) SANAE IV Station	71.6769°S 2.8282°W	173.2°	(South Africa) SANSA
South Pole	sps	(Antarctica) South Pole Station	89.995°S 118.291°E	75.7°	(United States) Penn State
Syowa East^{*}	sye	(Antarctica) Showa Station	69.0085°S 39.6003°E	106.5°	(Japan) NIPR
Syowa South^{*}	sys	(Antarctica) Showa Station	69.0108°S 39.5900°E	159.0°	(Japan) NIPR
Tiger	tig	(Australia) Bruny Island, Tasmania	43.3998°S 147.2162°E	180.0°	(Australia) La Trobe University
Unwin	unw	(New Zealand) Awarua, near Invercargill	46.5131°S 168.3762°E	227.9°	(Australia) La Trobe University
Zhongshan	zho	(Antarctica) Zhongshan Station	69.3766°S 76.3681°E	72.5°	(China) PRIC

*: Part of the Southern Hemisphere Auroral Radar Experiment

== Coverage ==
Northern Hemisphere

- Because the SuperDARN network evolved in the west during the late Cold War, coverage of Russia's arctic regions is poor.
- Although there is no shortage of possible sites to cover Russia's Arctic regions from Northern Europe and Alaska, the coverage would probably not be of high quality.
- Although Russian universities have worked with the University of Leicester and installed a HF radar in Siberia, national funding issues have limited the radar operations.
- The Polar Research Institute of China has extended mid-latitude coverage, christening the extension to SuperDARN "AgileDARN"

Southern Hemisphere

- Although Antarctica is covered reasonably well, the Sub-Antarctic regions do not have uniform coverage due to the large expanse of ocean.
- Java VM real time display software interoperability (where both poles could be observed at the same time) is still a work in progress.
SuperDARN in action
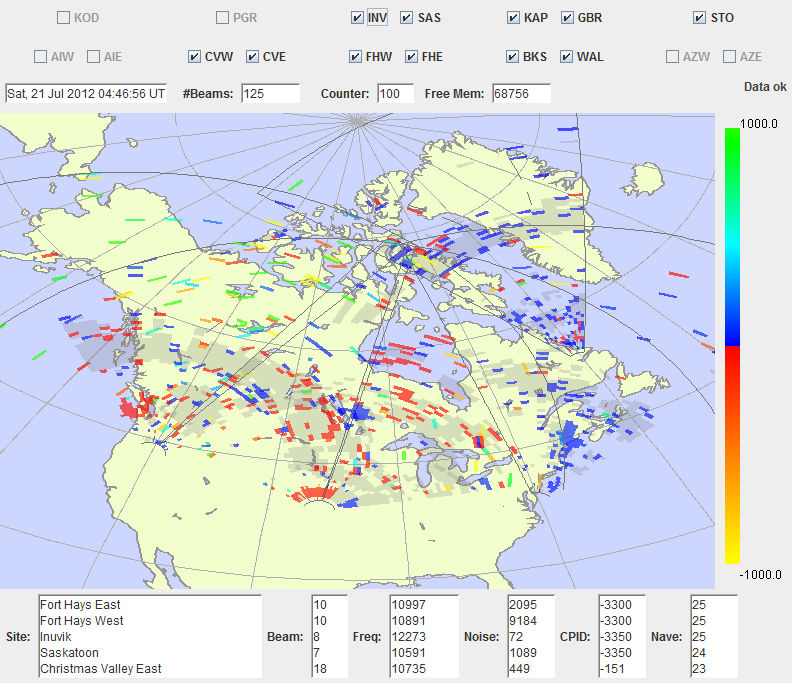
Real Time Java applet display of SuperDARN network for the Americas

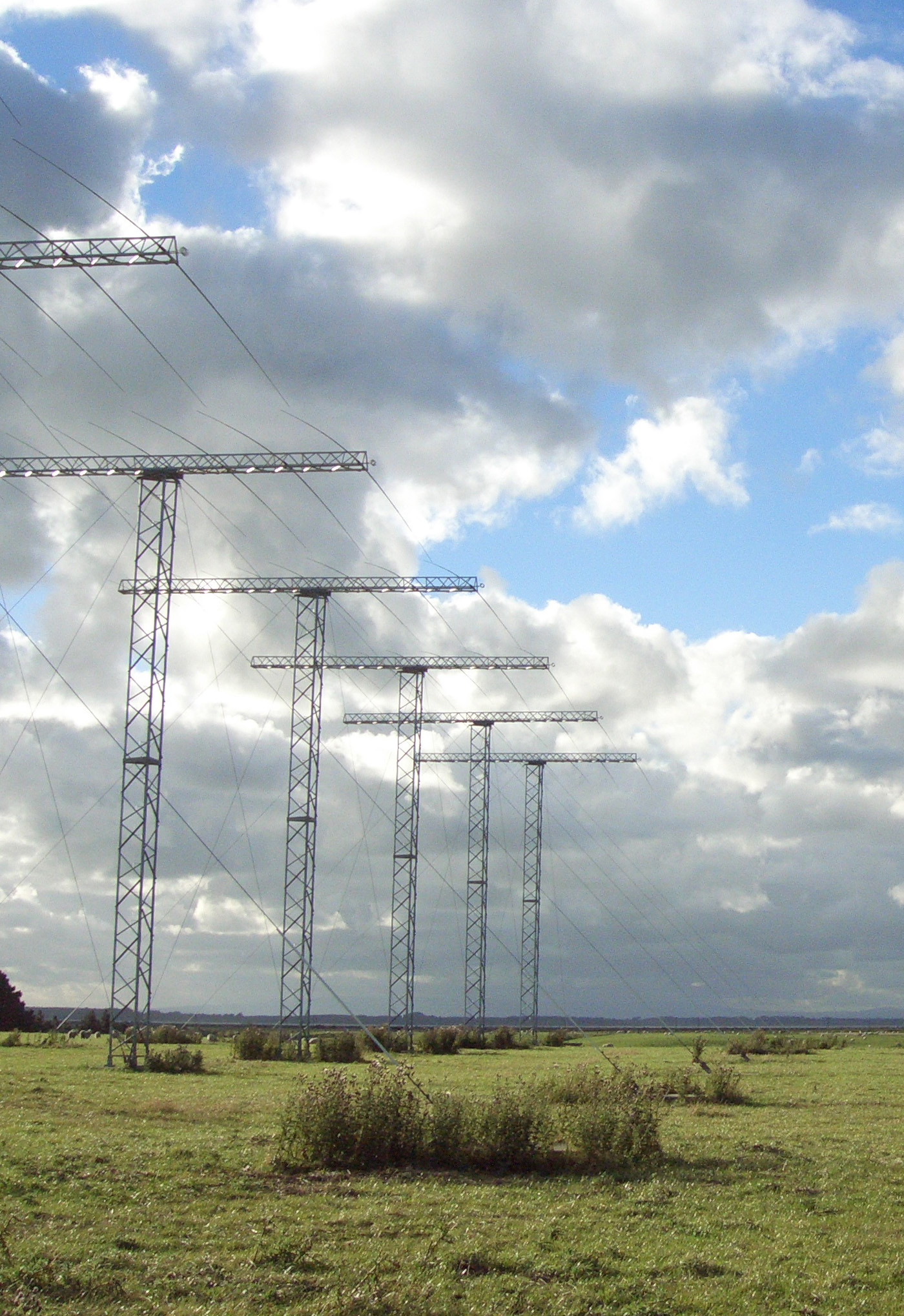
The Unwin Radar is a scientific radar array at Awarua Plain near Invercargill, New Zealand

== Annual SuperDARN Workshops ==
Each year the SuperDARN scientific community gather to discuss SuperDARN science, operations, hardware, software and other SuperDARN related issues. Traditionally, this workshop has been hosted by one of the SuperDARN PI groups, often at their home institution, or at another location such as a site close to a radar installation. A list of the SuperDARN workshop locations and their host institutions is provided below:

Year	Venue	Host Institution
2025	Blacksburg, Virginia, USA	Virginia Polytechnic Institute of Technology (VT)
2024	Beijing, China	National Space Science Center, Chinese Academy of Sciences
2023	Drakensburg, South Africa	University of KwaZulu-Natal
2022	Online	National Space Science Center, Chinese Academy of Sciences
2021	Online	University of Saskatchewan
2020	Online	University of KwaZulu-Natal
2019	Fujiyoshida, Yamanashi, Japan	National Institute of Information and Communications Technology (NICT)
2018	Banyuls-sur-Mer, France	L'Institut de Recherche en Astrophysique et Planétologie (IRAP)
2017	San Quirico D'Orcia, Siena, Italy	Institute for Space Astrophysics and Planetology (IAPS) of the National Institute for Astrophysics (INAF)
2016	Fairbanks, Alaska, USA	Geophysical Institute, University of Alaska Fairbanks
2015	Leicester, UK	Radio and Space Plasma Physics Group (RSPP), University of Leicester
2014	Longyearbyen, Svalbard, Norway	The University Centre in Svalbard (UNIS)
2013	Moose Jaw, Saskatchewan, Canada	University of Saskatchewan
2012	Shanghai, China	Polar Research Institute of China
2011	Hanover, New Hampshire, USA	Dartmouth College
2010	Hermanus, South Africa	SANSA Space Science (previously the Hermanus Magnetic Observatory, HMO)
2009	Cargèse, Corsica, France	Le Centre national de la recherche scientifique (CNRS)
2008	Newcastle, New South Wales, Australia	School of Mathematical & Physical Sciences, University of Newcastle
2007	Abashiri, Hokkaido, Japan	Institute for Space-Earth Environmental Research, Nagoya University
2006	Chincoteague, USA	Johns Hopkins University, Applied Physics Laboratory (APL)
2005	Cumbria, UK	British Antarctic Survey (BAS)
2004	Saskatoon, Canada	University of Saskatchewan
2003	Kiljava, Finland	
2002	Valdez, Alaska, USA	Geophysical Institute, University of Alaska Fairbanks
2001	Venice, Italy	
2000	Beechworth, Victoria, Australia	La Trobe University
1999	Reykjavik, Iceland	
1998	Tokyo, Japan	National Institute of Polar Research (NIPR)
1997	Ithala Game Reserve, South Africa	
1996	Ellicott City, MD, USA	
1995	Madingley Hall, Cambridge, UK	British Antarctic Survey
1994	Orléans, France	Institut de Recherche en Astrophysique et Planétologie (IRAP)
1993	Saskatoon, Saskatchewan, Canada	University of Saskatchewan

== Research papers ==
Research papers related to SuperDARN and related technologies

- Double Pulse Operations with SuperDARN
- The TIGER Radar, An Extension of SuperDARN

Real time display of SuperDarn radar

- Realtime Java applet display (North American Arctic)
