= Bettine van Vuuren =

South African zoologist

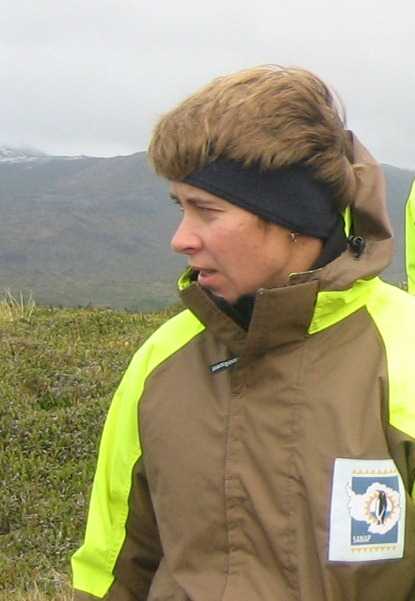
- Bettine van Vuuren in 2006
- Education: B.Sc. (Hons) Zoology, University of Pretoria (1992) MSc, University of Pretoria (1995) PhD in Zoology (2000)
- Scientific career
- Fields: Zoology
- Workplaces: University of Johannesburg
- Website: Bettine Jansen van Vuuren University of Johannesburg

Bettine van Vuuren is the Registrar and a Member of the Executive at the University of Johannesburg. She is also a Professor of Zoology and Director of the Centre for Ecological Genomics and Wildlife Conservation at the University of Johannesburg.

== Early life and education ==
Bettine van Vuuren studied at the University of Pretoria, South Africa. She was awarded a PhD in Zoology on the topic 'Molecular phylogeny of duiker antelope (Mammalia: Cephalophini) .

She subsequently relocated to Stellenbosch University following a postdoctoral position at the University of Montpellier II, France. Her research focused on game mammals in French Guiana and the results contributed towards the development of hunting laws for the protection of Neotropical game species. She was invited to become a core team member of the Centre of Excellence for Invasion Biology (CIB) (ended 2014).

In 2011, she accepted a position at the University of Johannesburg (where she established the Molecular Zoology Laboratory), and in 2016 / 2017, was awarded a University of Johannesburg research center (Centre for Ecological Genomics and Wildlife Conservation). In 2021, she became the Senior Director: Strategic Initiatives and Administration, and in 2023 the Registrar at the University of Johannesburg. She has been involved with the supervision of more than fifty PhD and MSc students and has hosted more than ten postdoctoral fellows.

== Career and impact ==
van Vuuren believes that aspects of her research must have practical conservation and management application. She has driven research documenting genetic patterns for several of Africa's economically important game species (such as roan and sable antelope, black rhino, nyala and buffalo). Through ongoing interaction, she feeds her research back to nature conservation, industry and the general public. To this end, she was involved (2005–2007, and again in 2013–2014) with the Draft Regulations for the Biodiversity Act (#10 of 2004) as the Coordinator for the listing on invasive vertebrate species (excluding fishes) and was largely responsible, in collaboration with Dr Preston (Deputy Director General: Environmental Programmes, Department of Environmental Affairs), for the listing of mammal species and associated distribution maps. She serves, when required, as a scientific adviser to the Department of Environmental Affairs: Directorates Biodiversity and Conservation (this work relates mostly to the translocation and permitting of antelope species), as well as Environmental Programmes (this includes work from an alien invasive perspective). She is also a member of the Academy of Science of South Africa (ASSAf) Standing Committee on STEMI (Science, Technology, Mathematics and Innovation).

In addition to studying spatial patterns on the African continent, her research has a strong Antarctic / sub-Antarctic focus. She has worked extensively on Marion Island (of the Prince Edward Islands) as a project leader and was the first female Chief Scientist in the South African National Antarctic Programme's annual relief voyage in 2006. She serves as the Chair of the South African Committee for the Scientific Committee on Antarctic Research (SCAR) (International Science Council committees), and the South African Delegate (Voting) to SCAR. She was one of the deputy chairs to a SCAR Scientific Research Programme (Ant-ICON), the Alternate South African representative to SCAR Life Sciences, and the South African representative on a SCAR Action Group on Integrated Science for the Sub-Antarctic (ISSA).

She has strong national (academia, SANBI, government, industry, etc.) and international (CIBIO Portugal, Australian Antarctic Division, University of Queensland Australia etc.) collaborations.
