= Vesleskarvet =

Exposed ridge on Queen Maud Land, Antarctica

- Location within Antarctica

Highest point
- Elevation: 250 m (820 ft)
- Coordinates: 72°40′S 02°50′W

Naming
- Etymology: Norwegian for "the little barren mountain"

Geology
- Mountain type: Nunatak

Vesleskarvet is a nunatak on the west side of Ahlmann Ridge located in Queen Maud Land, Antarctica. Its western side consists of a series of cliffs, approximately 250 m high, while the eastern side slopes more gradually down to the icefields. The accessibility of the relatively level wind-swept snow-free summit made it ideal for the establishment of the permanent South African National Antarctic Programme research base SANAE IV.

It was mapped by Norwegian cartographers from surveys and air photos by the Norwegian-British-Swedish Antarctic Expedition (NBSAE) (1949–52) and air photos by the Norwegian expedition (1958–59) and named Vesleskarvet, meaning "the little barren mountain."

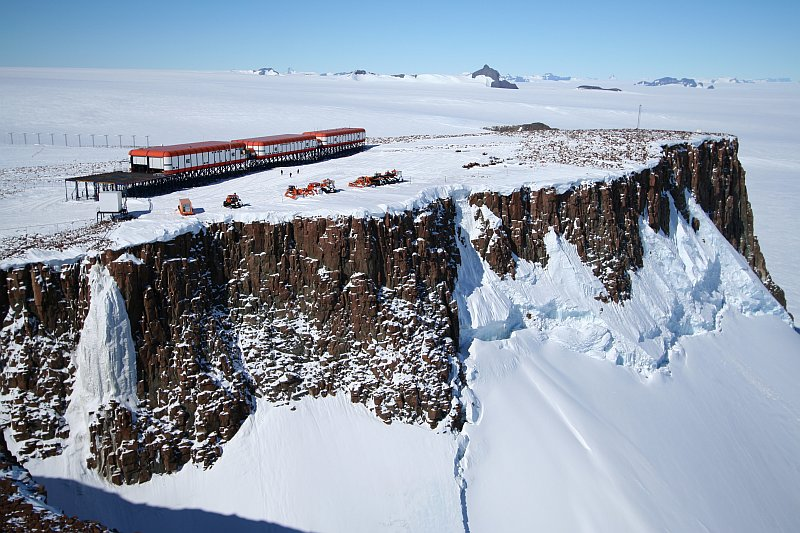
SANAE IV

== See also ==
- Knerten Rock, an isolated rock 7 nautical miles (13 km) north of Vesleskarvet Cliff
