= Sarah Baartman (ship) =

Environmental offshore patrol vessel

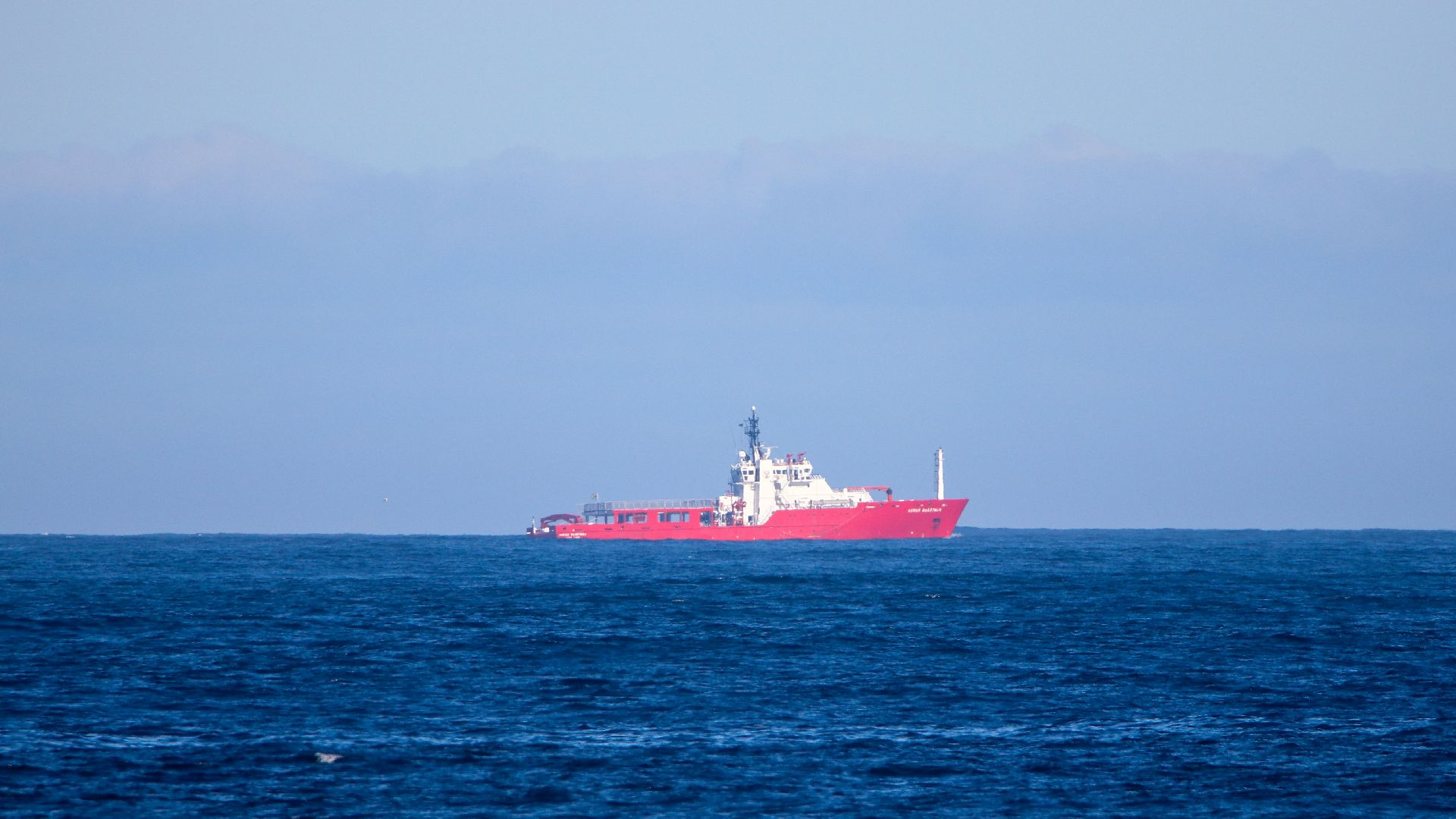

History

South Africa
- Name: Sarah Baartman
- Namesake: Sarah Baartman
- Operator: Department of Agriculture, Forestry and Fisheries
- Ordered: 2002
- Cost: 150 million South African rand
- Laid down: July 2003
- Launched: 17 June 2004
- Commissioned: 10 January 2005
- Identification: IMO number: 9288679; MMSI number: 601739000; Callsign: ZRSB

General characteristics
- Class & type: Offshore environmental protection vessel
- Length: 82.9 m (272 ft 0 in)
- Beam: 13 m (42 ft 8 in)
- Draught: 4 m (13 ft)
- Depth of hold: 7.2 m (23.5 ft)
- Propulsion: 5,470 shp (4,080 kW)
- Speed: 22 knots
- Range: 12,000 nmi (22,000 km) at 15 knots (28 km/h; 17 mph)
- Endurance: 45 days
- Complement: 18 crew, 4 cadets, 7 officers
- Aviation facilities: Helicopter landing pad

Sarah Baartman is a South African environmental protection vessel—of the Damen Offshore Patrol Vessel 8313 class. The Sarah Baartman was commissioned on 10 January 2005. Named after Khoikhoi woman, Sarah Baartman, she was built by Damen Group, of the Netherlands, at one of its Romanian shipyards, and was designed to be capable of patrolling South Africa's entire EEZ, including the area around the southerly Prince Edward Islands.

On 3 October 2007 the Sarah Baartman took custody of two men accused of murdering a fellow crew member of the South African icebreaker S. A. Agulhas.

The South African government has been criticized for chartering the Sarah Baartman to support offshore oil drilling.

The vessels carry limited equipment for enclosing and skimming oil spills, and fire-fighting water cannons.
