= South African Maritime Safety Authority =

Agency overview
- Formed: 1 April 1998; 27 years ago
- Jurisdiction: South African exclusive economic zone
- Headquarters: 146 Lunnon Road, Hillcrest, Pretoria
- Annual budget: R 590.8 million (2023/24)
- Parent department: Department of Transport
- Website: https://www.samsa.org.za

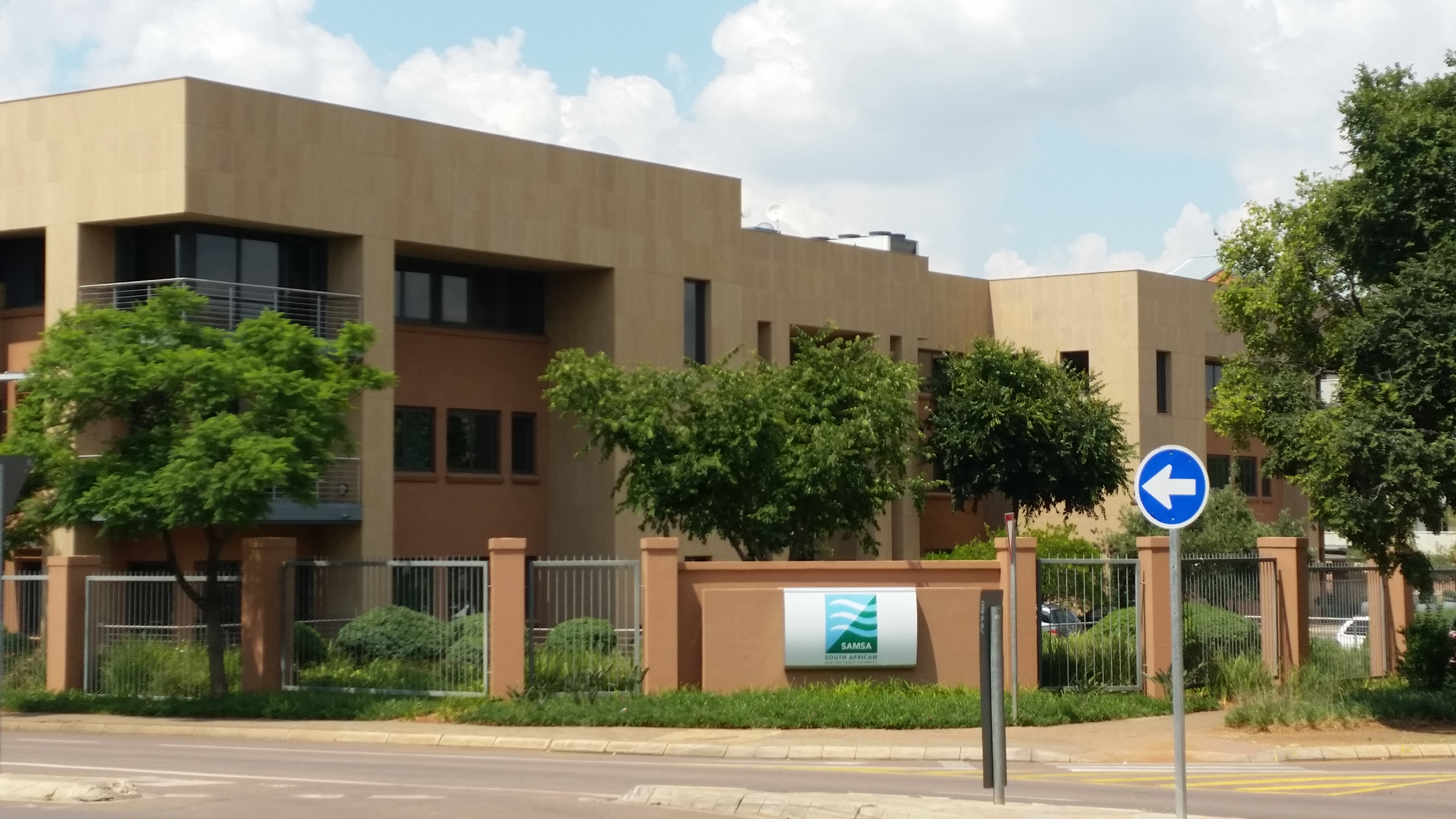
The South African Maritime Safety Authority Headquarters in Pretoria

The South African Maritime Safety Authority (SAMSA) is a South African government agency responsible for the implementation of current international and national regulations regarding the maritime industry as well as upon all recreational marine vessels within its jurisdiction.

It is mandated in ensuring the safety of life and property at sea, preventing and combating of pollution of the marine environment by ships and promotion of the Republic’s maritime interests.

It was established on 1 April 1998 as a result of the South African Maritime Safety Authority Act 5 of 1998.

== Overview of services ==
=== On behalf of Government ===
- Advise Government on maritime issues relating to or affecting South Africa
- Administer current legislation & policies, submit additional proposals thereon as & when required so as to flag State Implementation
- Represent South Africa at international forums, liaise with foreign governments & other International institutions on behalf of South African Government
- On behalf of the Minister of Transport liaise with other South African institutions & various State Departments
- Administration of government maritime contracts
- Provide a maritime Search and Rescue (SAR) capability within the South African area of responsibility - via the management (on behalf of DOT) of the Maritime Rescue Coordination Centre (MRCC)
- Conduct Accident investigations and provide Emergency Casualty Response
- Control of State Ports, including management of the DOT contracted pollution prevention and response capability

=== To Maritime Industry (Local & International) ===
- Conduct Statutory surveys and issue Safety certification of vessels
- Certification of Seafarers
- Provide Assistance and advice on maritime legislation
- Provide advice & grant approval in construction and refitting of vessels, including the evaluation & approval of fittings & equipment used.
- Consultancy to industry on technical matters, safety and qualifications

=== To Stakeholders ===
- Safety equipment approval
- Port State Control Inspections
- Inspections of ships and cargoes of timber, grain and hazardous goods
- Accreditation of maritime training institutions and maritime training programmes
- Monitoring of South African seafarers’ welfare and conditions of service
- Provision of maritime safety information to shipping & ensuring a reliable radio service
- Ensuring that navigational aids are in place around the South African coastline
- Assimilation and maintenance of shipping information and statistics

It is subordinate to the Minister of Transport, who heads the Department of Transport. Despite it being a marine authority, its head office is located in Pretoria, at least 500 km away from the nearest ocean.

SAMSA administers the South African ship register.

== History ==
In July 2012 the authority acquired the former Antarctic supply vessel S. A. Agulhas as a training ship.

== See also ==
- National Sea Rescue Institute
- South African Civil Aviation Authority
- Railway Safety Regulator
