= Borga Base =

- Antarctic research station
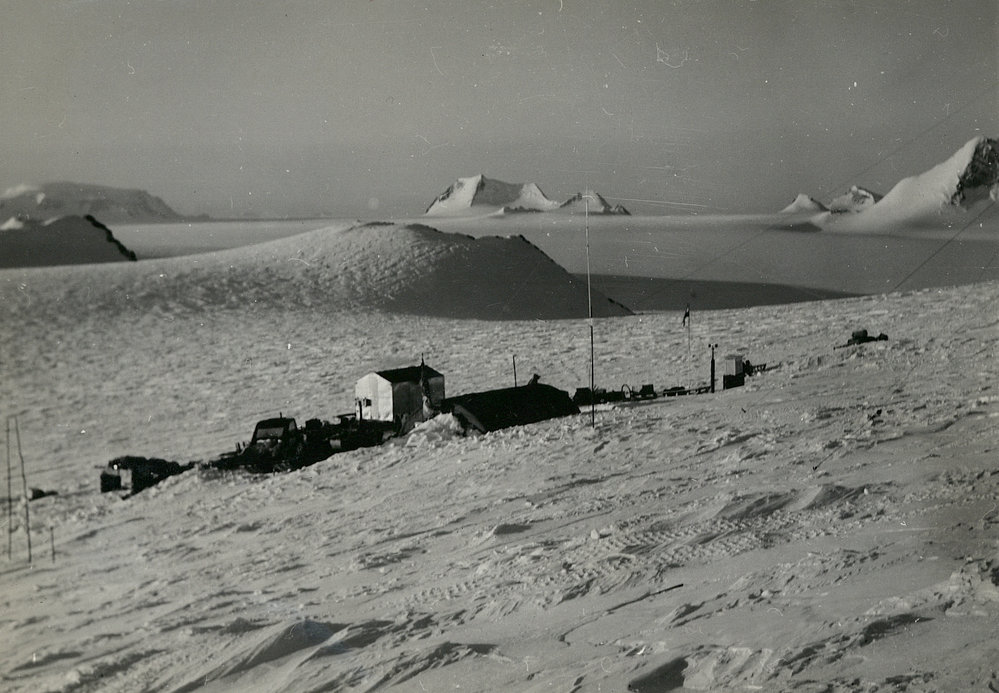
- The base before being decommissioned

- Location in Antarctica
- Coordinates: 72°57′54″S 3°47′47″W
- Region: Queen Maud Land
- Location: Borg Massif
- Established: 1969
- Closed: 1976

Government
  - Type: Administration
  - Body: SANAP, South Africa
- Elevation: 980 m (3,220 ft)
- Active times: Every summer

Borga Base was a semipermanent Antarctic research station operated by South Africa named after Borg Massif where it was located. It was created to house 4-5 people year-round and was 350 kilometers (220 miles) south of the location of South Africa's primary Antarctic research station, SANAE IV. Its main building was a Parcoll hut, a long hut with a semicircular frame resembling half a cylinder.

== History ==
Borga Base was created with the support of Belgian aircraft during the International Geophysical Year and was inaugurated in 1969. In the years of its operation, expedition teams would attempt the traverse from SANAE to Borga Base using specialized tractors, though they were not always successful. In 1969, mechanic Gordon Mackie was the first casualty of South African Antarctic research when he fell to his death on the traverse between the two bases. In 1970, mechanical and weather difficulties forced the team to abandon their attempt to reach Borga. In 1971, mechanical issues once again prevented the team from reaching Borga Base so they created Grunehogna, another semi-permanent station, using a prefabricated hut.

== Research ==
The main research activities of Borga Base were geological surveying and weather monitoring.

== See also ==
- List of Antarctic research stations
- List of Antarctic field camps
