= Southern Hemisphere Auroral Radar Experiment =

Research project observing electrical activity in the ionosphere and magnetosphere

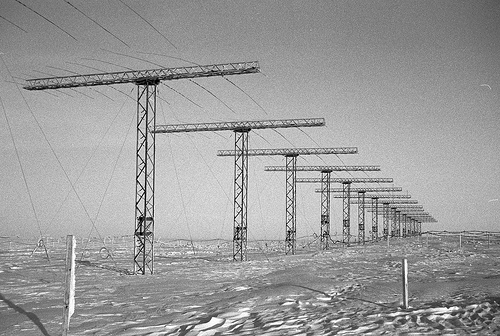
SHARE antenna array

The Southern Hemisphere Auroral Radar Experiment, or SHARE, started in 1988, is an Antarctic research project designed to observe velocities and irregularities of electrical fields in the ionosphere and magnetosphere. It is operated jointly by the University of Natal, Potchefstroom University, the British Antarctic Survey and Johns Hopkins University and operates out of British Halley Station, South African SANAE IV Station and Japanese Showa Station.

Using a total of 16 antennas, each mounted on a 12 m tower and radiating on fixed frequencies in the 8–20 MHz range, SHARE transmits a radio frequency pulse into the upper atmosphere every two minutes. The three stations' ranges overlap to cover most of the Antarctic continent.

SHARE is part of the international Super Dual Auroral Radar Network (SuperDARN). It supplies valuable data to track space weather.
