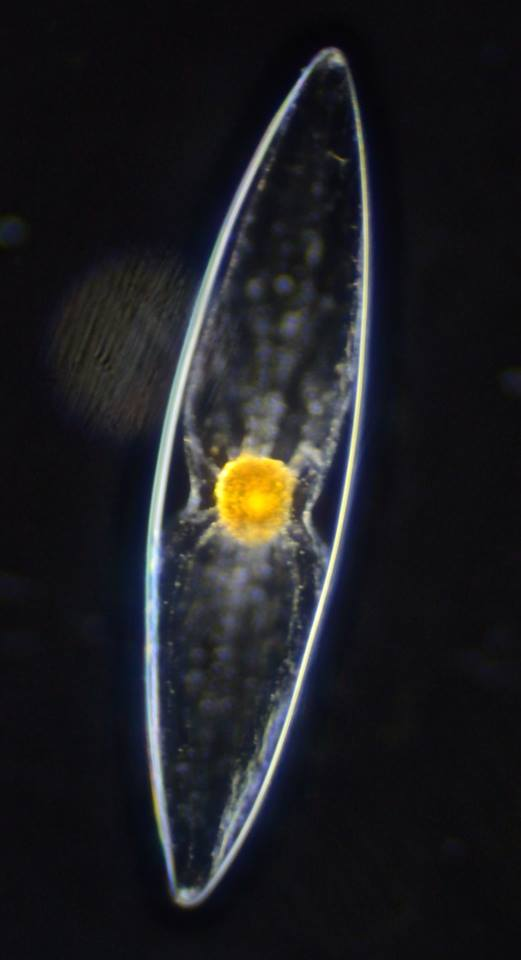

Scientific classification
- Domain: Eukaryota
- Supergroup: Alveolata
- Division: Dinoflagellata
- Class: Dinophyceae
- Order: Gonyaulacales
- Family: Pyrocystaceae
- Genus: Pyrocystis
- Species: P. fusiformis

Binomial name
- Pyrocystis fusiformis C.W.Thomson, 1876

= Pyrocystis fusiformis =

Species of single-celled organism

Pyrocystis fusiformis is a non-motile, tropical, epipelagic, marine dinoflagellate (flagellate microorganisms), reaching lengths of up to 1 millimetre (0.039 in). P. fusiformis display bioluminescence when disturbed or agitated. In coastal marine waters, this dinoflagellate causes glowing effects after dark. P. fusiformis was first described in the Proceedings of the Royal Society of London in 1876.

== Morphology ==
Pyrocystis fusiformis's name is derived from its tapered or spindle shape. P. fusiformis is non-motile, which is a characteristic of all members of family Pyrocystaceae, which lose their flagellum by the time these organisms are adults. P. fusiformis is considered a large dinoflagellate, with each cell being approximately 970 x 163 μm long and having a spherical diameter of 374 μm. The cell's chloroplasts actually change the cell's shape as they move closer to the cell's wall in daytime and retract towards the nucleus at night. The chloroplasts can also respond morphologically to intense light, such as UV light, by contracting. P. fusiformis is autotrophic, deriving their energy from the sun through photosynthesis. P. fusiformis will only photosynthesize during daylight hours and mostly produce bioluminescence during night because of their circadian rhythm which controls both processes.

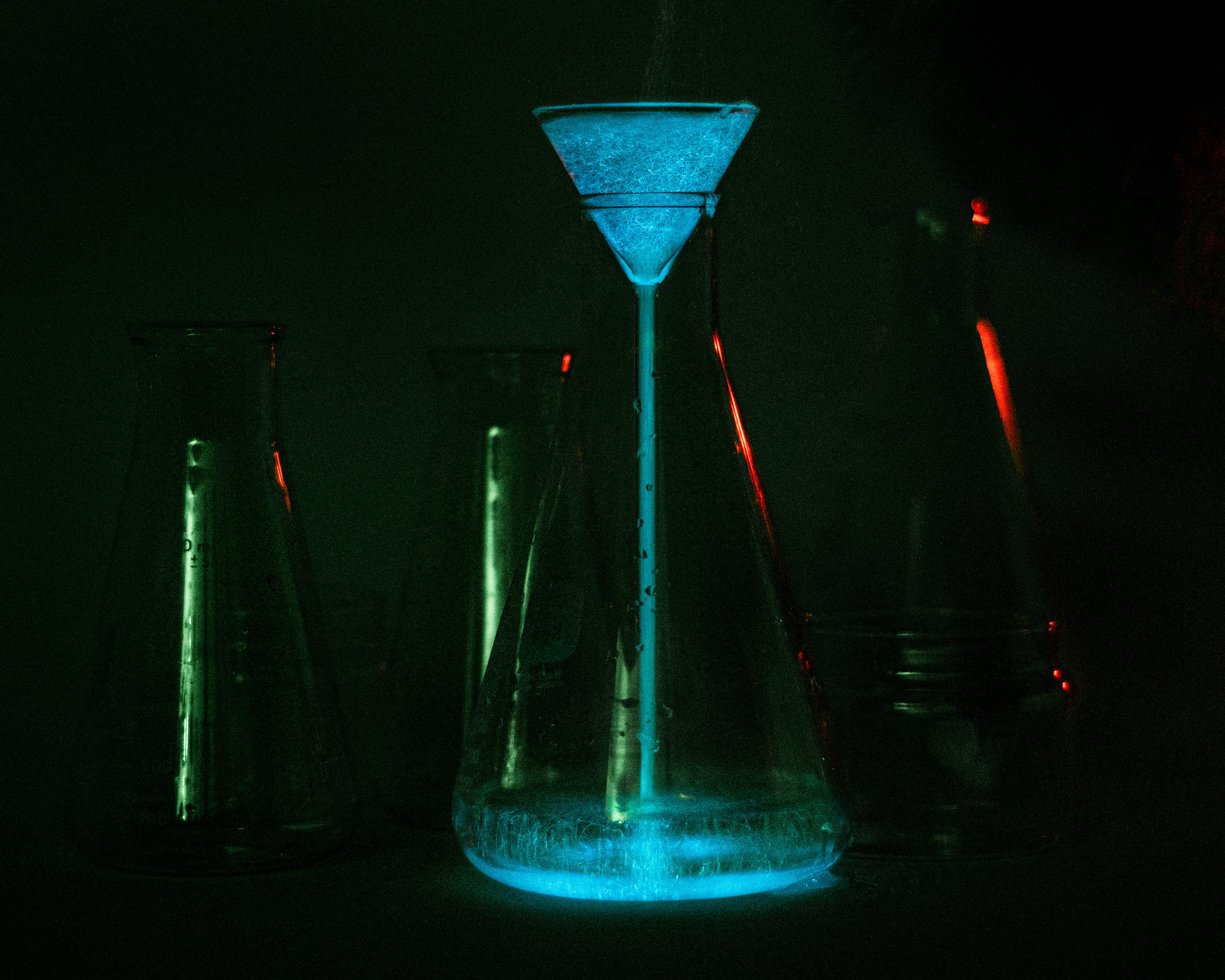
Pyrocystis fusiformis bioluminescent dinoflagellates being poured in a flask.

=== Bioluminescence ===
Bioluminescence occurs when an organism emits light through a chemical reaction with the majority of the world's bioluminescent organisms living in the ocean. The production of bioluminescence by P. fusiformis is thought to be a defense mechanism that startles grazers which would otherwise eat them or to illuminate grazers so that they, in turn may be more visible to their own predators, known as the "Burglar Alarm" theory.

In P. fusiformis bright blue light is produced through the reaction of the enzyme luciferase and protein-like compound luciferin in the cell's plasma membrane. Blue is believed to be the most common bioluminescent color produced in the ocean as blue light waves travels the farthest in seawater. The dinoflagellete type of luciferin used in this reaction is one of the four common types of luciferin found in the marine environment, and the genome of P. fusiformis contains shared common origin with other dinoflagellates that contain the luciferase enzyme. In the laboratory, two different types bioluminescent flashes have been observed. One is bright and quick, while the other is dim but longer-lasting. The intensity and duration of these flashes are dependent on the time a cell has to recharge in between emitting light, with recovery periods varying between 15–60 minutes and 6 hours for fatigued cells.

== Life cycle ==
Pyrocystis fusiformis has a full life cycle of approximately 5–7 days and reproduces asexually. The reproduction phase creates 1 or 2 zoospores which grow inside of the parent's cell wall until they become new cells. Observed in the laboratory under culture, asexual reproduction begins when the protoplast contracts away from the parental cell wall. In P. fusiformis, the protoplasm contracts near the middle of the cell forming two lobes, as opposed to Pyrocystis lunula, which forms crescent moon-like shapes while dividing. Once the protoplasm divides, it differentiates into reproductive cells. These cells then swell very quickly, creating new parent cells.

== Ecology ==
Phytoplankton including P. fusiformis play a large role in global carbon cycling by fixing carbon while also producing a large amount of oxygen through photosynthesis. Some oxygen produced by phytoplankton is dissolved into marine waters and helps support respiration for heterotrophic organisms. However, large quantities of oxygen diffuse into the atmosphere through surface waters, contributing up to 50% of the world’s atmospheric oxygen. Phytoplankton also form the basis of the marine food chain and are preyed upon by various organisms, such as grass shrimp, mosquito fish, mysids, and copepods. They contribute to the primary production of the ocean through the fixing of carbon into usable energy.

It is estimated that P. fusiformis occurs most frequently at a depth of 60 and 100 meters in marine waters, tropical and subtropical bays and also oligotrophic waters, and has been found as deep as 200 meters. This species has been found in Taiwan, the Adriatic Sea, Black Sea, Canary Islands, Baja California, Brazil, India, China and Australia.

In oligotrophic water, nitrogen (N) is a limiting nutrient for phytoplankton growth. Nitrate (NO^{−}_{3}) and ammonium (NH^{+}_{4}), both inorganic form of nitrogen, are most often taken up by phytoplankton and are necessary for growth and metabolic processes. P. fusiformis is known to metabolize both nitrate and ammonium at relatively equal rates during both the day and the night, and is able to take in nitrate at depths of 120m or greater, deeper than many other phytoplankton. P. fusiformis is also able to take advantage of surplus carbon (C) in surface waters by using what it needs for metabolic processes immediately, and then catabolizing and storing excess C for use at greater depths, allowing it have a relatively constant rate of cell division throughout the euphotic zone.

== Human interest ==
Pyrocystis fusiformis is interesting to humans as a natural phenomenon to observe in the ocean, in addition to being easily cultivated in a controlled environment at home and in classrooms for study. P. fusiformis is commonly grown for science and art projects.

Because P. fusiformis is important to scientific study as it only flashes when agitated and could be utilized in flow visualization to help spot differences in water flow or disruption of water by predators. P. fusiformis can also be used as a bioassay tool in order to detect pollutants in marine waters. Scientists measure the amount of light that P. fusiformis (and other dinoflagellates) emits in order to measure the effects of pollution since the amount of light produced is related to how healthy these organisms are.

Pyrocystis fusiformis is also the main subject of a series of works by artist Erika Blumenfeld who has shown her work in museums and galleries around the world. Her large scale photographs demonstrate the blue color that P. fusiformis produces when agitated. Working with scientists at the Scripps Institution of Oceanography, Blumenfeld photographs P. fusiformis in order to "activate a dialogue about our natural environment and our relationship to it."

In 2025, Dutch fashion designer Iris van Herpen designed a dress using 125 million P. lunula.
