= S. A. Agulhas II =

Icebreaking polar supply and research ship

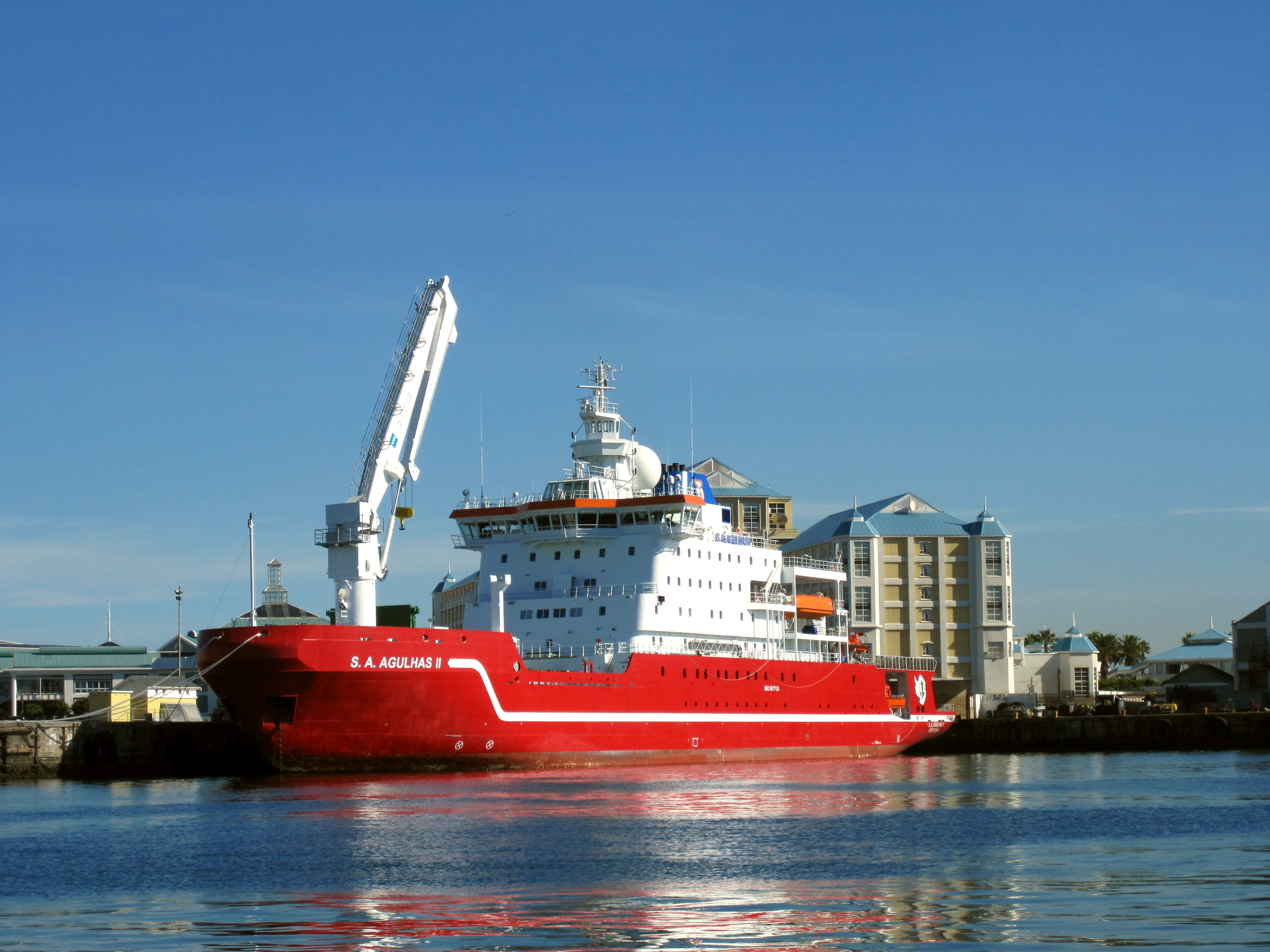
- S. A. Agulhas II at Cape Town Harbour

History

South Africa
- Name: S. A. Agulhas II
- Owner: Department of Forestry, Fisheries and the Environment
- Port of registry: Cape Town, South Africa
- Ordered: 17 November 2009
- Builder: STX Finland Rauma shipyard
- Cost: 116 million euro
- Yard number: 1369
- Laid down: 31 January 2011
- Launched: 21 July 2011
- Completed: 3 April 2012
- In service: 2012–
- Identification: IMO number: 9577135; Call sign: ZSNO; MMSI number: 601986000
- Status: In service

General characteristics
- Type: Polar supply and research vessel
- Tonnage: 12,897 GT; 3,840 NT; 4,780 DWT
- Displacement: 13,687 tons
- Length: 134.2 m (440 ft)
- Beam: 21.7 m (71 ft)
- Draught: 7.65 m (25.1 ft)
- Depth: 10.55 m (34.6 ft)
- Ice class: Polar Class 5
- Installed power: 4 × Wärtsilä 6L32 (4 × 3,000 kW)
- Propulsion: Diesel-electric; two shafts (2 × 4,500 kW); Two controllable pitch propellers
- Speed: 16 knots (30 km/h; 18 mph) (max); 5 knots (9.3 km/h; 5.8 mph) in 1 m (3.3 ft) ice
- Range: 15,000 nautical miles (28,000 km; 17,000 mi) at 14 knots (26 km/h; 16 mph)
- Capacity: 100 passengers in 46 cabins; 4,000 m^{3} (140,000 cu ft) cargo hold; 500 m^{3} (18,000 cu ft) of polar diesel
- Crew: 45
- Aircraft carried: 2 × Atlas Oryx
- Aviation facilities: Helideck and hangar

S. A. Agulhas II is a South African icebreaking polar supply and research vessel owned by the Department of Forestry, Fisheries and the Environment. She was built in 2012 by STX Finland Rauma shipyard in Rauma, Finland, to replace the ageing S. A. Agulhas, which was retired from Antarctic service in April 2012. Unlike her predecessor, S. A. Agulhas II was designed from the beginning to carry out both scientific research and supply South African research stations in the Antarctic.

During a voyage to the Weddell Sea in February and March 2022, the Agulhas II served as the mother ship for the Endurance22 Expedition of the Falklands Maritime Heritage Trust. Using a submersible vehicle, participants in the expedition located the wreck of Sir Ernest Shackleton's ship, Endurance, at a depth of 11,000 ft (3,400 m) beneath the surface on the floor of Weddell Sea. The Endurance had sunk in 1915 after being crushed by ice.

As of 2025 she is one of several ships that regularly take passengers to and from Tristan da Cunha. The British territory does not have an airport, and so relies on ships.

== Development and construction ==
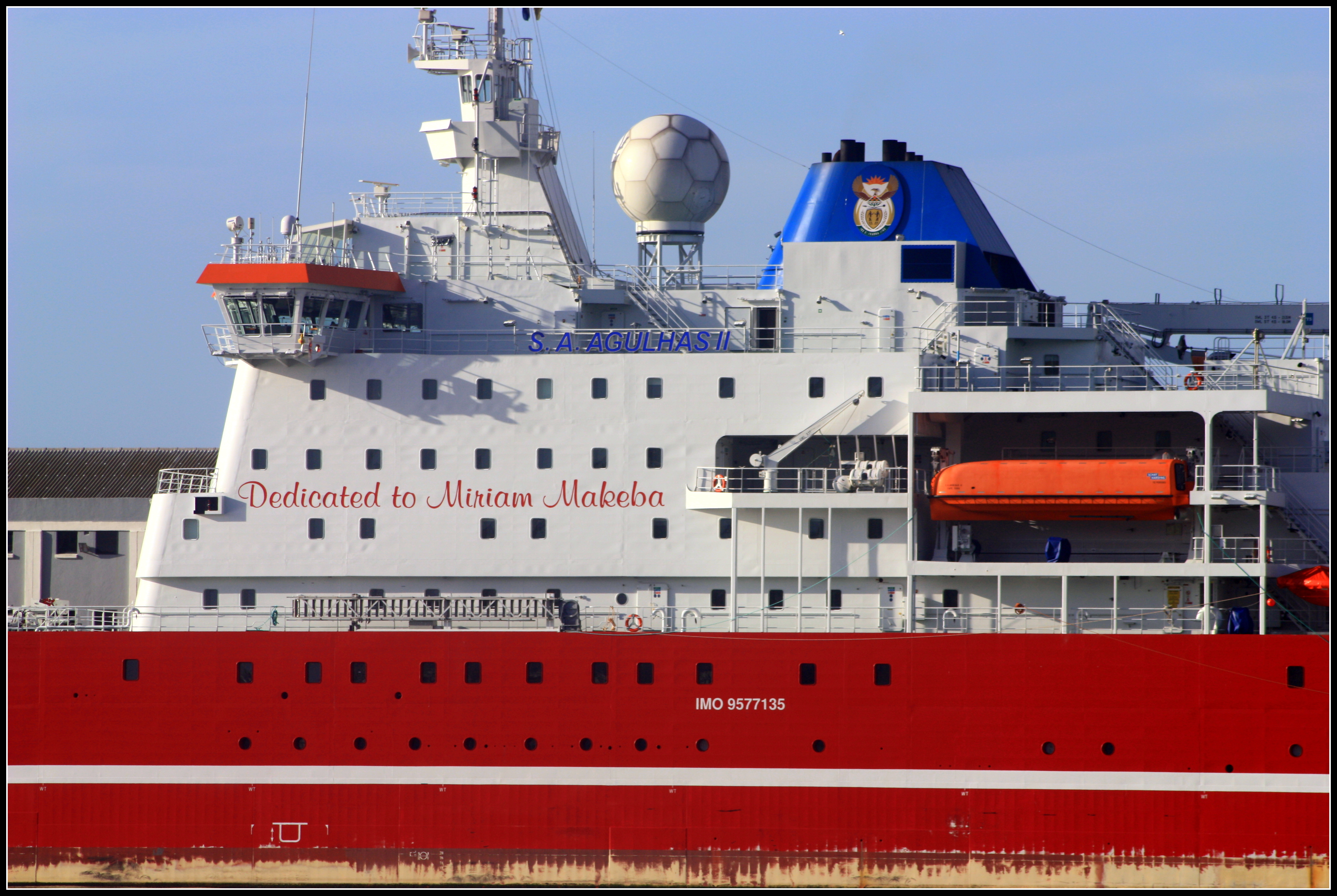
The text on the superstructure shows that S. A. Agulhas II is dedicated to the South African singer Miriam Makeba.

In November 2009 the South African Department of Water and Environmental Affairs signed a 116 million euro (R 1.3 billion) contract with STX Finland for the construction of a new polar research and supply vessel that would replace the ageing S. A. Agulhas, which was scheduled to be retired by 2012. The shipyard, located in Rauma, Finland, beat competing bids from Astellero Barreras from Spain, Damen Shipyards from the Netherlands and Keppel Singmarine from Singapore. The production began with the steel-cutting ceremony in September 2010.

The keel of the new ship, referred to by her yard number as NB 1369, was laid down on 31 January 2011. She was launched on 21 July 2011 and named S. A. Agulhas II. S. A. Agulhas II conducted her open water sea trials in February 2012 and, in order to verify the results of model tests, ice trials in the Bay of Bothnia in the Baltic Sea between 19 and 24 March. During the latter voyage the ship encountered level ice up to 0.6 metres (2.0 ft) thick and performed beyond expectations. In addition the hull and machinery of the vessel were instrumented to measure full-scale ice loads, and in the future S. A. Agulhas II will be used as a research platform by companies and universities from Finland and South Africa to gain more knowledge about the interaction between ice and the ship.

S. A. Agulhas II was handed over to the South African Department of Environmental Affairs on 4 April 2012 and left Finland for South Africa the following day. She arrived at her home port, Cape Town on 3 May. During a ceremony celebrating the arrival, the ship was dedicated to the memory of the singer Miriam Makeba.

== Design ==
=== General characteristics ===
The maximum overall length of S. A. Agulhas II is 134.2 metres (440 ft) and her length between perpendiculars is 121.25 metres (397.8 ft). The beam and depth of her hull are 21.7 metres (71 ft) and 10.55 metres (34.6 ft), respectively, and the maximum breadth of the ship is 22 metres (72 ft). The draught of S. A. Agulhas II is 7.65 metres (25.1 ft). Her displacement is 13,687 tons, gross tonnage is 12,897, net tonnage 3,870 and deadweight tonnage 4,780 tons. She is served by a crew of 45.

S. A. Agulhas II is classified by Det Norske Veritas with a class notation 1A1 PC-5 WINTERIZED BASIC Passenger Ship LFL* COMF-V(2)C(2) HELDK-SHF DEICE RP E0 DYNPOS-AUT NAUT-AW CLEAN DESIGN DAT(−35 °C) BIS TMON. Her ice class, Polar Class 5, means that she is designed for year-round operation in medium first-year ice which may include old ice inclusions. Her decks are heated to prevent ice accumulation in temperatures as low as −35 °C (−31 °F). S. A. Agulhas II is the first ship of her kind to be built to the new SOLAS 2009 rules for passenger ships, leading to several unique aspects in her design.

=== Facilities ===
Unlike her predecessor, S. A. Agulhas II was built from the beginning as both a polar supply ship as well as a research vessel. She has both onboard laboratories for scientific research as well as cargo holds and tanks for supplies for South African polar research stations. In addition she has accommodations for 100 passengers in 46 cabins and facilities such as gym, library, sauna, business centre and a 100-seat auditorium.

S. A. Agulhas II has eight permanent and six containerized laboratories for different fields of marine, environmental, biological and climate research totalling 800 square metres (8,600 sq ft). Deep-water probes can be launched either via a large door in the side of the vessel or, if the ship is operating in ice-infested waters, through a 2.4-by-2.4-metre (7.9 by 7.9 ft) moon pool. A drop keel containing transducers for the measurement of plankton density and ocean currents can be lowered 3 metres (9.8 ft) below the bottom of the ship. A hydraulic A-frame in the stern of the ship can be used to tow sampling nets and dredges.

To transport supplies to polar research stations, the ship has a 4,000-cubic-metre (140,000 cu ft) cargo hold located in the bow of the vessel. It is served by a 35-ton main crane and three 10-ton general cargo cranes, all of which can also be used to lower scientific equipment and vehicles on ice. When heavy loads are being lifted, a heeling tank is used to balance the vessel. S. A. Agulhas II is the first ship of her kind to be allowed to carry both passengers and fuel, such as polar diesel, Jet A helicopter fuel and petrol, as cargo.

S. A. Agulhas II has a hangar and helideck capable of serving two Atlas Oryx or Aérospatiale SA 330 Puma helicopters. She also has two fast rescue craft, which are on standby during helicopter operations, and two fully enclosed lifeboats for 75 personnel.

S.A. Agulhas II is fitted with a state-of-the-art Raytheon Anschutz integrated bridge navigation system. The vessel maintains positioning during offloading at the ice shelf, as well as during scientific survey work, using a Navis Engineering DP4000 dynamic positioning system.

=== Power and propulsion ===
S. A. Agulhas II is powered by four six-cylinder Wärtsilä 6L32 medium-speed diesel generating sets, each producing 3,000 kW (4,000 hp). To fulfill the International Maritime Organisation’s Safe Return to Port requirement, the main engines are located in two separate engine rooms and the ship is capable of returning to port with one engine room flooded. Designed according to the power plant principle in which the main generators supply electricity for all shipboard consumers, S. A. Agulhas II has no separate auxiliary generators. In case of emergency, electricity is provided by a Volvo Penta emergency diesel generator.

The ship has a diesel-electric powertrain with two Converteam 4,500 kW propulsion motors driving 4.5-metre (15 ft) KaMeWa controllable pitch propellers, a relatively uncommon feature in diesel-electric ships which usually use fixed-pitch propellers. The propulsion system gives her a maximum speed of 16 knots (30 km/h; 18 mph) in open water, but her service speed is slightly lower, and at 14 knots (26 km/h; 16 mph) her operating range is 15,000 nautical miles (28,000 km; 17,000 mi). Furthermore, S. A. Agulhas II is designed to be able to break level ice with a thickness of 1 metre (3.3 ft) at 5 knots (9.3 km/h; 5.8 mph). For dynamic positioning and manoeuvring in ports she has two Rolls-Royce bow thrusters and one stern thruster.

== Gallery ==
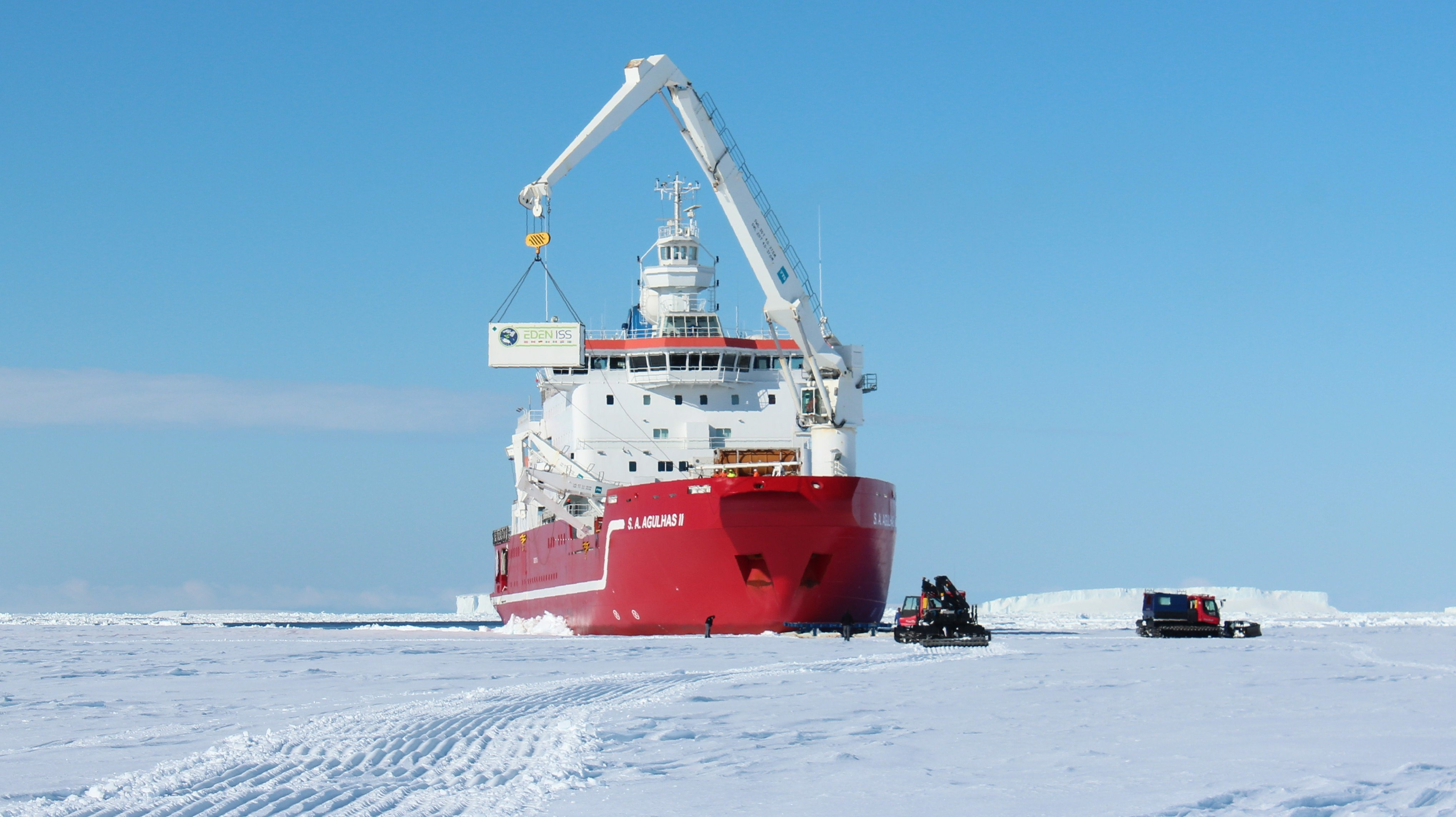
S. A. Agulhas II offloading the EDEN-ISS Antarctic greenhouse at Neumayer Station III

== See also ==
- South African National Antarctic Programme
- SANAE
- Gough Island
- Marion Island
