= Novyy Island =

- Location within Antarctica

Geography
- Location: Antarctica
- Coordinates: 70°50′S 2°50′W

Administration
- Administered under the Antarctic Treaty System

Demographics
- Population: Uninhabited

Novyy Island is the larger and southern island of two similar ice covered features that serve to delimit the Jelbart and Fimbul Ice Shelves, on the coast of Queen Maud Land. The summit of this feature rises about 250 m above the surrounding ice shelf. The island was partly delineated by the Norwegian Antarctic Expedition, 1956–60. It was mapped by the Soviet Antarctic Expedition in 1961 and named "Kupol Novyy" (new dome).

== See also ==
- List of antarctic and sub-antarctic islands
