= SANAE IV =

- Antarctic base
- South African National Antarctic Expedition IV
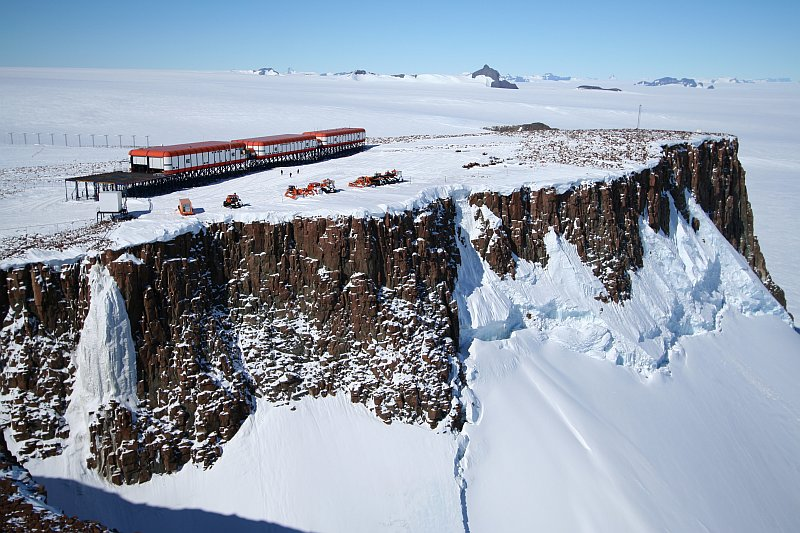
- SANAE IV on top of the southern buttress of Vesleskarvet.

- Location of SANAE IV in Antarctica
- Coordinates: 71°40′25″S 2°49′43″W
- Country: South Africa
- Location in Antarctica: Vesleskarvet; Queen Maud Land
- Administered by: SANAP
- Established: 1997
- Elevation: 850 m (2,790 ft)

Population (2017)
  - Summer: 110
  - Winter: 15
- UN/LOCODE: AQ SNA
- Active times: All year-round
- Status: Operational
- Activities: List: Oceanography; Geology; Geomorphology

SANAE IV is a current South African Antarctic research base located in Vesleskarvet, Queen Maud Land. The base is part of the South African National Antarctic Programme (SANAP) and is operated by the South African National Antarctic Expedition.

The other two SANAP bases are located on the Gough and Marion islands.

== Location ==
Located in the Queen Maud Land region of Eastern or Greater Antarctica, SANAE IV is on top of a distinctive flat-topped nunatak, Vesleskarvet, on the fringe of the Ahlmann Range of mountains. The base is approximately 80 kilometres (50 mi) from the edge of the continent (also known as the grounding line or hinge zone) and 160 kilometres (99 mi) from the edge of the ice shelf. Vesleskarvet is completely surrounded by the glacial ice sheet.

== Concept ==
The first three SANAE research stations were located on the Fimbul Ice Shelf near the coast, and were subject to the gradual snow burial and eventual crushing that occurs with all stations constructed in this fashion. With a vision of creating a more permanent station, SANAE IV was completed in 1997 using a design which was revolutionary at the time - a structure raised on stilts which allows snow to blow through underneath and thus limits deposition.

By constructing the base near the cliffs of Vesleskarvet, the concept was advanced further: snow that would collect downwind of the base and eventually advance to cover it is instead blown off the 250 m high cliffs into the wind-scoop beyond. By virtue of this feature, the station should far exceed the short useful life of its predecessors, and the raised design has since been applied to newer stations, such as the British Antarctic Survey's new Halley Research Station and Germany's new Neumayer Station III.

The station has an orange coloured roof for better visibility from the air. The underside of the station used to be painted in a blue colour which in theory was warmed somewhat by the sun and contributed to reducing the build-up of ice underneath the station. In 1999 the South African minister of Environment and Tourism decided that this colour scheme is too reminiscent of South Africa's old flag, and ordered the orange roof to be painted bright red. Eventually, the roof remained orange and the blue underside was painted orange as well.

== Base layout ==
SANAE IV consists of three linked modules, each double-story, 44 metres (144 ft) long and 14 metres (46 ft) wide. Two smaller nearby structures contain the satellite dish used for communications and the diesel fuel bunkers. Joined end-on-end in a north–south orientation, the base modules are complemented on the northern end by a large raised helicopter landing area with a lifting section allowing vehicles to be brought up into the hangar for maintenance.

C-block, the northernmost module, contains the large hangar, generator room, workshop, water storage, sewage processing plant, equipment stores, offices of the mechanical and electrical engineers, flight operations office, gymnasium and sauna. The neutron monitors of the North-West University are also housed in this area.

B-block, the middle module, contains the kitchen, dining area, two TV lounges, bar, games room, smoker's room, library, a laundry and accommodation units.

A-block, the southern module, contains the radio room and communications hub, medical facility, darkroom, various research project offices, leader's office, two physics labs, wet lab, store-rooms, another laundry, and accommodation units.

The modules are linked by single-story connections that also serve as entrances with stairways down to the surface 4m below the base. Each link contains an entrance hall with two sets of doors (creating a rudimentary 'air-lock' to prevent excessive cooling when entering and exiting the base) as well as a change-room, ablution facility and electronic distribution boards.

== Facilities ==
SANAE IV Skiway
- IATA: none; ICAO: AT22

Summary
- Airport type: Private
- Serves: SANAE IV
- Location: Vesleskarvet
- Time zone: (+2)
- Elevation AMSL: 2,647 ft (807 m)
- Coordinates: 71°40′21″S 2°49′29″W

Map
- Location of airfield in Antarctica

Runways
Direction	Length		Surface
Direction	ft	m	Surface
17/35	3,274	998	Snow

The base generates power using three diesel generators. Water is generated by manually shovelling snow into a snow smelter, which then melts the snow and ice and pumps water automatically into the holding tanks. Waste water and sewerage is treated within the base, with the only by-product being clean water which is then released back into the environment. All refuse is sorted, crushed and sealed in empty fuel drums for return to South Africa.

Although the base is well insulated by its 0.5-metre (1 ft 8 in) thick walls and triple-glazed windows, the internal areas have to be actively warmed. This is accomplished by three means. Firstly, the heat generated by the diesel generators is used to heat water for the taps and showers, which is then circulated through the base. Secondly, the same generator heat is used to heat air which is distributed by the climate control system. Thirdly, small electric wall and fan heaters are available in all indoor areas. Efforts are made to maintain the interior temperature at 18 °C (64 °F), although some areas (such as the hangar) do cool well below this in winter.

SANAE IV has advanced communications capabilities using both satellite and radio systems. A permanent satellite connection to the SANAP headquarters in Cape Town provides three telephone lines and one fax line, and near-broadband internet access. Team members in Antarctica enjoy fast internet access which allows them to correspond with colleagues and stay in contact with friends and family.

== Staff ==
The base is staffed and maintained year-round by a team of scientists and support personnel. Each overwintering team arrives during the summer expedition and take-over period aboard the research and logistics vessel S. A. Agulhas II, stays at the base through the austral winter and returns to South Africa at the end of the next summer season - an expedition of approximately 16 months. The summer expedition and re-supply team (excluding ship's crew) consists of 80–100 persons, and includes administrative staff, heavy vehicle operators, helicopter crew, maintenance staff, the new overwintering team and a large scientific contingent. During the brief summer (typically December/January to February/March) the base must be resupplied with food, equipment and fuel, all waste products must be removed for transport back to South Africa, the new overwintering team must receive on-site training, and scientific investigations which cannot be undertaken in the winter months (such as extended field-work) must be completed.

The overwintering team remains at the base alone and isolated between the months of March and December. To be fully self-sufficient, the team typically consists of the following personnel:

- An electronic engineer who doubles as communications technician,
- A mechanical engineer responsible for the base systems
- An electrical engineer who manages power generation and distribution
- Two diesel mechanics responsible for maintenance of the diesel generators, heavy vehicles and skidoos
- A meteorologist who performs both observations and forecasting
- A cosmic ray physicist/engineer responsible for various research projects
- A high frequency radar physicist/engineer responsible for the auroral radar projects
- A third scientist responsible for the International Polar Year projects and other installations
- A medical doctor

An expedition leader is selected from the overwintering team prior to the departure of the expedition, and a deputy elected to serve in his place should the need arise. The expedition leader is responsible for administrative tasks and reports to the South African National Antarctic Programme headquarters in South Africa.

== Research ==
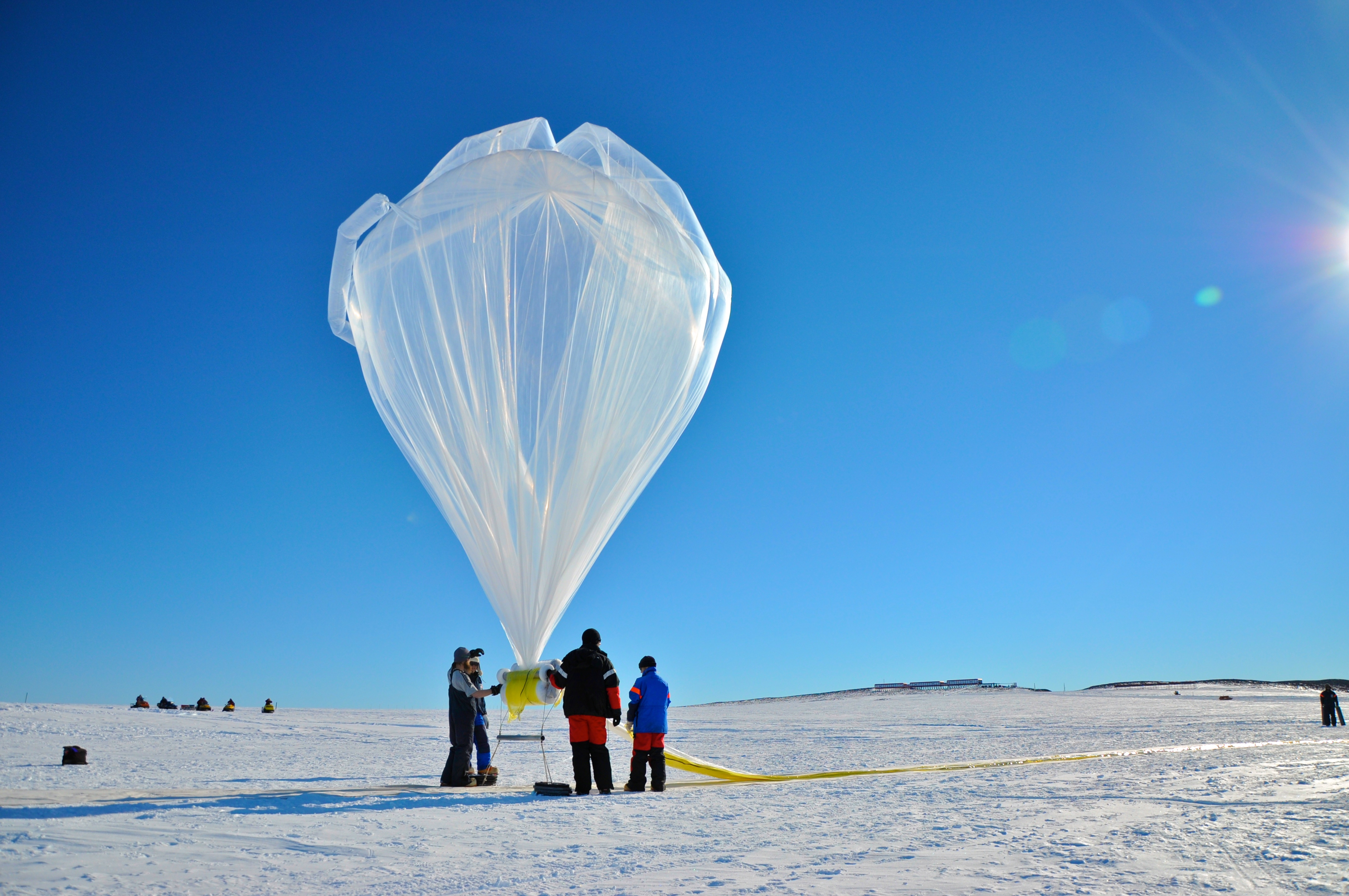
A balloon floats into the sky as it is partially filled.

SANAE IV's reason for existence is to provide a permanent year-round base for scientists undertaking research projects under the auspices of SANAP. Investigations carried-out year-round are predominantly in the physical sciences, while the summer months allow research in more diverse fields such as oceanography, biology, geology and geomorphology. Recent projects have also focused on sources of renewable energy such as solar and particularly wind power generation. There is not currently any formal medical research being undertaken.

Ongoing physical science research programs includes the Antarctic Magnetospheric and Ionospheric Ground-based Observation (AMIGO), Southern Hemisphere Auroral Radar Experiment (SHARE) and Super Dual Auroral Radar Network (SuperDARN), Antarctic Research on Cosmic Rays (ANOKS), very low frequency (VLF) radio research and various International Polar Year projects.

Detailed information about the research projects may be found under the research section of the SANAP webpage

== 2025 assault incident ==
In March 2025, an incident at SANAE IV received attention in South African media following reports of alleged misconduct among members of the overwintering team. A group of nine researchers stationed at the remote Antarctic base, where personnel are typically isolated for extended periods, were involved in a dispute that escalated into a physical altercation.

According to the South African government, the incident involved an assault following a disagreement over a work task that required a schedule change. Reports based on an internal email described "deeply disturbing behaviour", alleging that a team member had physically assaulted a colleague, made death threats, and created an "environment of fear". South Africa's Department of Forestry, Fisheries and the Environment (DFFE) confirmed that an assault had occurred and stated that a response plan was activated shortly after the incident was reported in February 2025. The department initiated mediation and psychological support measures, while the alleged perpretator was reported to have shown remorse, undergone further evaluation, and issued a formal apology to victims. Allegations of sexual harassment were investigated, while officials stated that reports of sexual assault were not substantiated.

Due to SANAE IV's extreme isolation located more than 4,000 km from mainland South Africa and largely inaccessible during the winter months no evacuation was undertaken, although an "emergency medical evacuation to a neighboring German base" was possible if such a circumstance occurred, and sources within the Antarctic research community suggested that South Africa has access to ice-capable ships and aircraft if an evacuation is deemed necessary. The situation continued to be monitored by government officials. Former SANAE IV overwinterer Lodrick Hlungwane described the psychological strain of the environment, stating that "It's a very challenging place. If you isolate yourself, you're bound to lose it", and noted that some individuals struggle to adapt, becoming withdrawn or prone to conflict under prolonged isolation.

The incident also attracted attention from researchers studying human behaviour in extreme environments as they pertain to long-duration space missions, namely future crewed missions to Mars, where similar psychological stressors would be present but with even fewer possibilities for evacuation or external intervention. While noting that violence in Antarctic bases is rare in modern times, psychologists familiar with Antarctic missions stated that the confinement, monotony, disrupted sleep cycles, and limited external stimuli of Antarctic overwintering can amplify interpersonal tensions and impair emotional regulation. This incident was used by psychologists as an example of how existing screening methods may not reliably predict how individuals will respond under prolonged isolation, and more advanced examinations may be necessary for astronauts on similarly isolating missions.

== See also ==
- List of Antarctic research stations
- List of Antarctic field camps
- List of airports in Antarctica
- List of Antarctic expeditions
- Demographics of Antarctica
- Crime in Antarctica
