= South African National Antarctic Programme =

Government research programme

- Formation: 1959; 67 years ago
- Location: South Africa
- Parent organisation: Department of Science and Innovation
- Website: https://www.sanap.ac.za/

The South African National Antarctic Programme (SANAP) is the South African government's programme for research in the Antarctic and Subantarctic. Three research stations fall under this programme: the Antarctica research station SANAE IV, and one station each on the subantarctic islands Gough Island and Marion Island. These stations are managed and administered by the Directorate: Antarctic and Islands of the Department of Environmental Affairs. Borga Base was also operated by SANAP from 1969 to 1976.

The mission of the South African National Antarctic Programme is to increase understanding of the natural environment and life in the Antarctic and Southern Ocean through appropriate science and technology.

South Africa is one of the original signatory states of the Antarctic Treaty.

== Experiments ==
In April 2017, SANAP launched an experiment on Marion Island called Probing Radio Intensity at high-Z from Marion (PRIZM), searching for signatures of the hydrogen line in the early universe. There are other global experiments looking for the same signal, but PRIZM is set apart by its location on Marion Island, which, at 2000 km from the nearest permanent inhabitants, is one of the most remote locations on Earth, allowing access to the full frequency range of the global signal without radio-frequency interference.

== Notable people associated with the program ==
- Bettine van Vuuren, zoologist

== See also ==
- S. A. Agulhas – South African ice-strengthened training ship and former polar research vessel
- S. A. Agulhas II – Icebreaking polar supply and research ship
- Research stations in Antarctica
- South African Weather Service – Meteorological agency of South Africa
