= Icebreakers of Russia =

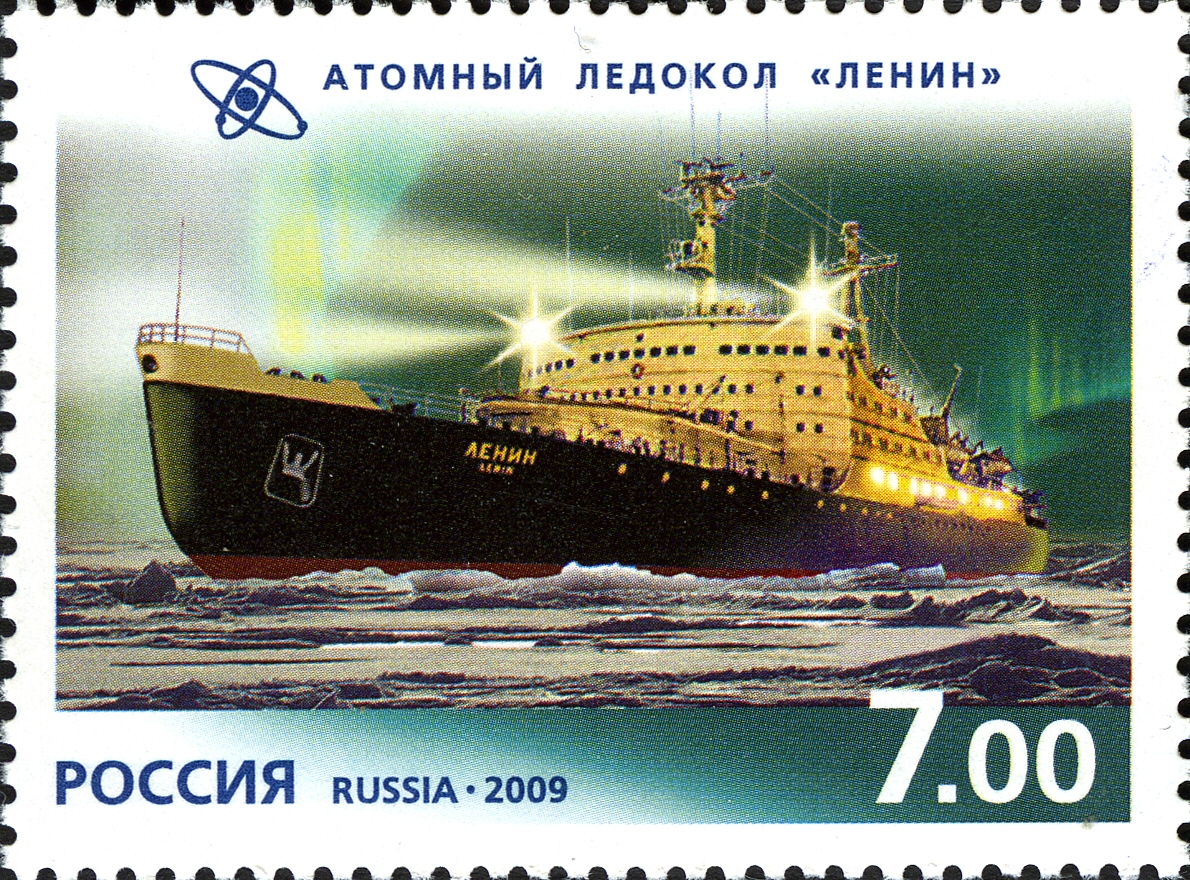
The first Soviet nuclear-powered icebreaker, Lenin

There is a disagreement as to whether the Russia first "true" icebreaker was Pilot (manufactured in Great Britain in 1862, whose ice-breaking capabilities were enhanced in Russia in 1864) or genuinely first 1898 Arctic ice-faring icebreaker Yermak.

== Classification ==
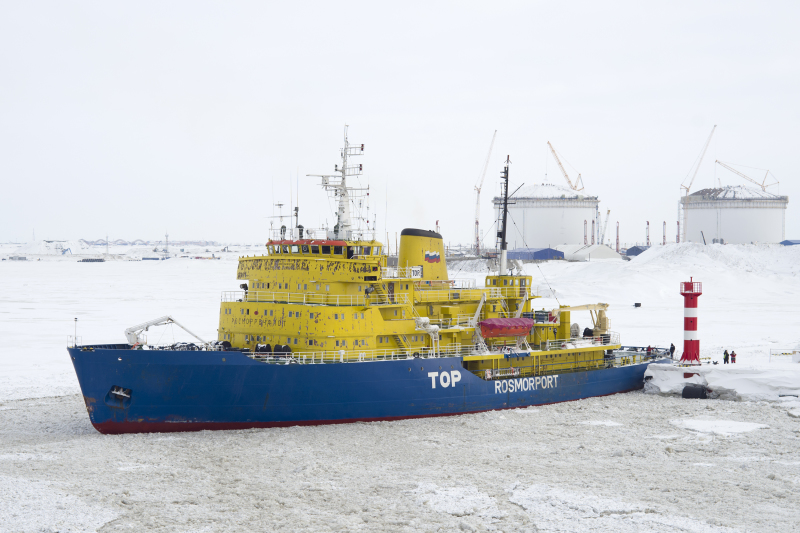
Russian port icebreaker Tor in the ice-covered port of Sabetta

In Russia, icebreakers are classified in several ways, according to different criteria:

- By purpose
  - Leader icebreakers: The most powerful icebreakers that head ship caravans
  - Line icebreakers: For guiding and towing of ships on sea routes, for freeing ice-stuck ships
  - Auxiliary icebreakers: for work in ports, river mouths, and for emergency rescue operations
- By ice passability:
  - heavy icebreakers can break through ice up to 2 m thick
  - medium icebreakers, for ice from 1 to 1.5 m thick
  - light icebreakers, for ice less than 1 m thick
- By power type:
  - Steam engine; obsolete, unused
  - Diesel-electric engine; the most common type
  - Nuclear-powered icebreakers
- By operating method
  - Ice-cutting. These ships existed in 19th-20th centuries, and for them the term "icecutter" was used in Russia
  - Ice-breaking
- By operational area
  - River icebreakers
  - Marine icebreakers
  - Port icebreakers

The official classification of a particular vessel may be found in the database of the Russian Maritime Register of Shipping.

The following lists include icebreakers owned and/or operated by either governmental or commercial entities. Ships known to be currently in service are presented in bold.

== Nuclear-powered icebreakers ==
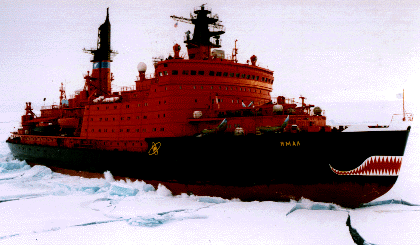
Russian nuclear-powered icebreaker Yamal

The following ships are nuclear-powered icebreakers;

- Lenin (1959–1989; museum ship in Murmansk)
- Arktika class
  - Arktika (1975–2008; ex-Leonid Brezhnev, ex-Arktika; decommissioned)
  - Sibir (1977–1992; decommissioned)
  - Rossiya (1985–2013; decommissioned)
  - Sovetskiy Soyuz (1990–2014; decommissioned)
  - Yamal (1992–)
  - 50 Let Pobedy (2007–)
- Taymyr class
  - Taymyr (1989–)
  - Vaygach (1990–)
- Project 22220
  - Arktika (2020–)
  - Sibir (2021–)
  - Ural (2022–)
  - Yakutiya (2024–)
  - Chukotka (2026– (planned); under construction)
  - Leningrad (2028– (planned); under construction)
  - Stalingrad (2030– (planned); under construction)
- Project 10510
  - Rossiya (2030– (planned); under construction)

== Diesel-powered icebreakers ==
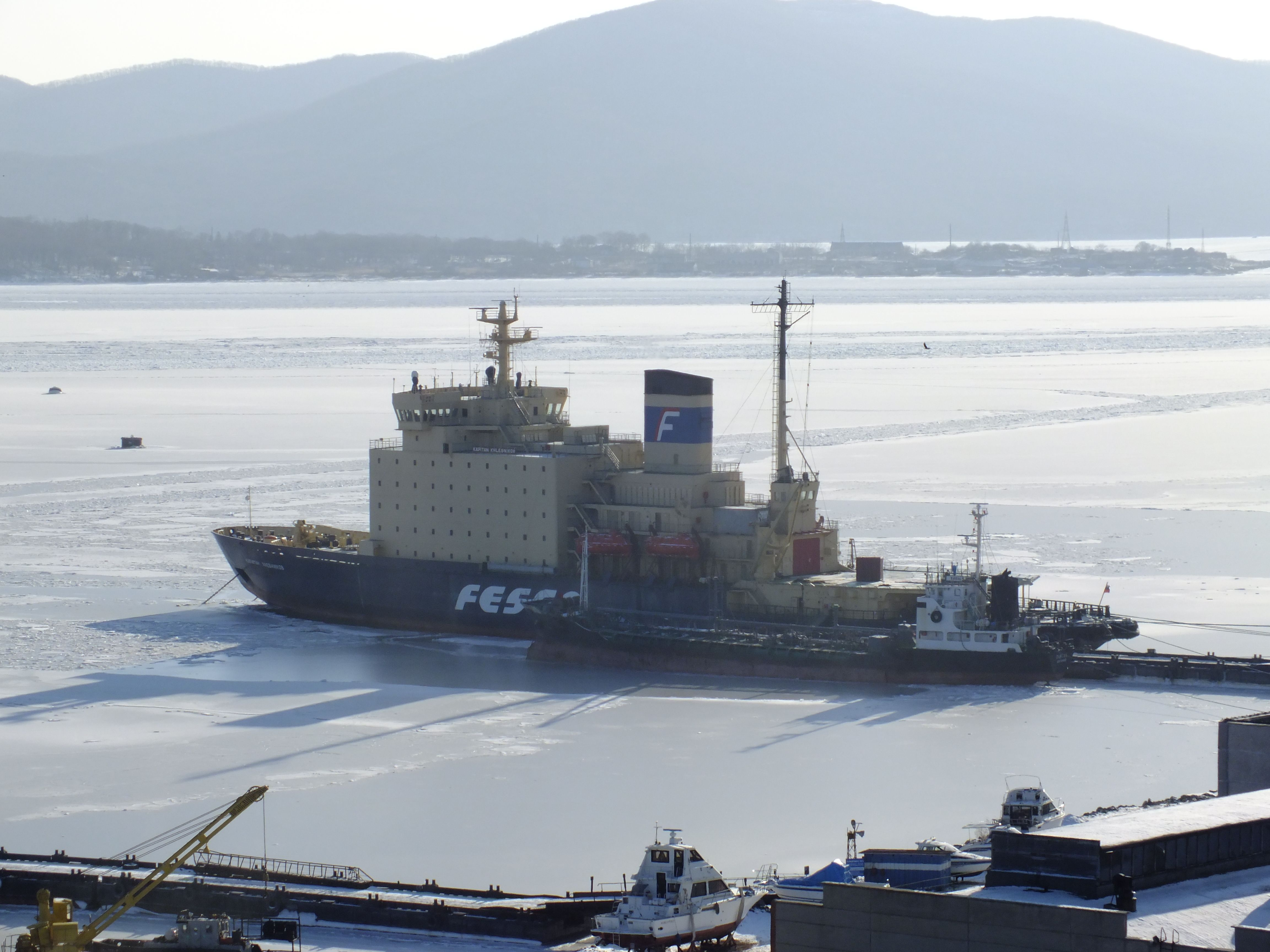
Icebreaker Kapitan Khlebnikov in Vladivostok

The following ships are/were fitted with diesel engines for powering their propulsion;

- Wind class
  - Severny Veter (1944–1951; ex-USCGC Staten Island; returned to the United States)
  - Severniy Polyus (1945–1951; ex-USS Westwind; returned to the United States)
  - Admiral Makarov (1945–1949; ex-USCGC Southwind; returned to the United States)
- Kapitan Belousov class
  - Kapitan Belousov (1954–1991; sold to Ukraine)
  - Kapitan Voronin (1955–1996; broken up)
  - Kapitan Melekhov (1956–1994; broken up)
- Moskva class
  - Moskva (1959–1998; broken up)
  - Leningrad (1960–1993; broken up)
  - Kiev (1965–1993; broken up)
  - Murmansk (1968–1995; broken up)
  - Vladivostok (1969–1997; broken up)
- Civilian variants of Dobrynya Nikitich class (Project 97A)
  - Vasiliy Pronchishchev (1961–1989; ex-Ledokol-1; broken up)
  - Afanasy Nikitin (1962–1992; ex-Ledokol-2; passed over to Ukraine)
  - Khariton Laptev (1962–1996; ex-Ledokol-3; broken up)
  - Vasiliy Poyarkov (1963–1988; ex-Ledokol-4; broken up)
  - Yerofey Khabarov (1963–1993; ex-Ledokol-5; broken up)
  - Ivan Kruzenstern (1964–; ex-Ledokol-6)
  - Vladimir Rusanov (1964–1988; ex-Ledokol-7; broken up)
  - Semyon Chelyuskin (1965–1988; ex-Ledokol-8; broken up)
  - Yuriy Lisyanskiy (1965–2021; ex-Ledokol-9; to be broken up)
  - Fyodor Litke (1970–2013; broken up)
  - Ivan Moskvitin (1971–1997; broken up)
  - Semyon Dezhnev (1971–)
- Ermak class
  - Ermak (1974–2021; broken up)
  - Admiral Makarov (1975–)
  - Krasin (1976–)
- Kapitan M. Izmaylov class
  - Kapitan M. Izmaylov (1976–)
  - Kapitan Kosolapov (1976–)
  - Kapitan A. Radzhabov (1976–1992; transferred to Azerbaijan)
- Kapitan Sorokin class
  - Kapitan Sorokin (1977–; fitted with Thyssen-Waas bow in 1991)
  - Kapitan Nikolaev (1978–; rebuilt in 1990)
  - Kapitan Dranitsyn (1980–)
  - Kapitan Khlebnikov (1981–)
- Kapitan Chechkin class
  - Kapitan Chechkin (1977–)
  - Kapitan Plakhin (1977–)
  - Kapitan Chadaev (1978–)
  - Kapitan Krutov (1978–)
  - Kapitan Bukaev (1978–)
  - Kapitan Zarubin (1978–)
- Mudyug class
  - Mudyug (1982–; fitted with Thyssen-Waas bow in 1986)
  - Magadan (1982–)
  - Dikson (1983–)
- Kapitan Evdokimov class
  - Kapitan Evdokimov (1983–)
  - Kapitan Babichev (1983–)
  - Kapitan Chudinov (1983–)
  - Kapitan Borodkin (1983–)
  - Avraamiy Zavenyagin (1984–)
  - Kapitan Mecaik (1984–)
  - Kapitan Deminov (1984–)
  - Kapitan Moshkin (1986–)
- Tor (2000–; purchased from Sweden)
- Karu (2002–2020; ex-Karhu, ex-Kapitan Chubakov; purchased from Estonia; broken up)
- Dudinka (2006–; ex-Apu; purchased from Finland)
- Project 21900
  - Moskva (2008–)
  - Sankt-Peterburg (2009–)
- Project 21900M
  - Vladivostok (2015–)
  - Murmansk (2015–)
  - Novorossiysk (2016–)
- Ob (2019–)
- Georgiy Sedov (2019–; ex-Antarcticaborg; purchased from Kazakhstan)
- Viktor Chernomyrdin (2020–)
- Project 21900M2
  - Unnamed Project 21900M2 icebreaker (construction stopped as of 2021)
  - Unnamed Project 21900M2 icebreaker (2028– (current estimate); under construction)
- Project 23620
  - Unnamed Project 23620 icebreaker (2024– (original plan); ordered)
  - Unnamed Project 23620 icebreaker (2024– (original plan); ordered)
- Project 22740M
  - Unnamed Project 22740M icebreaker (under construction)
  - Unnamed Project 22740M icebreaker (under construction)

== Steam-powered icebreakers ==
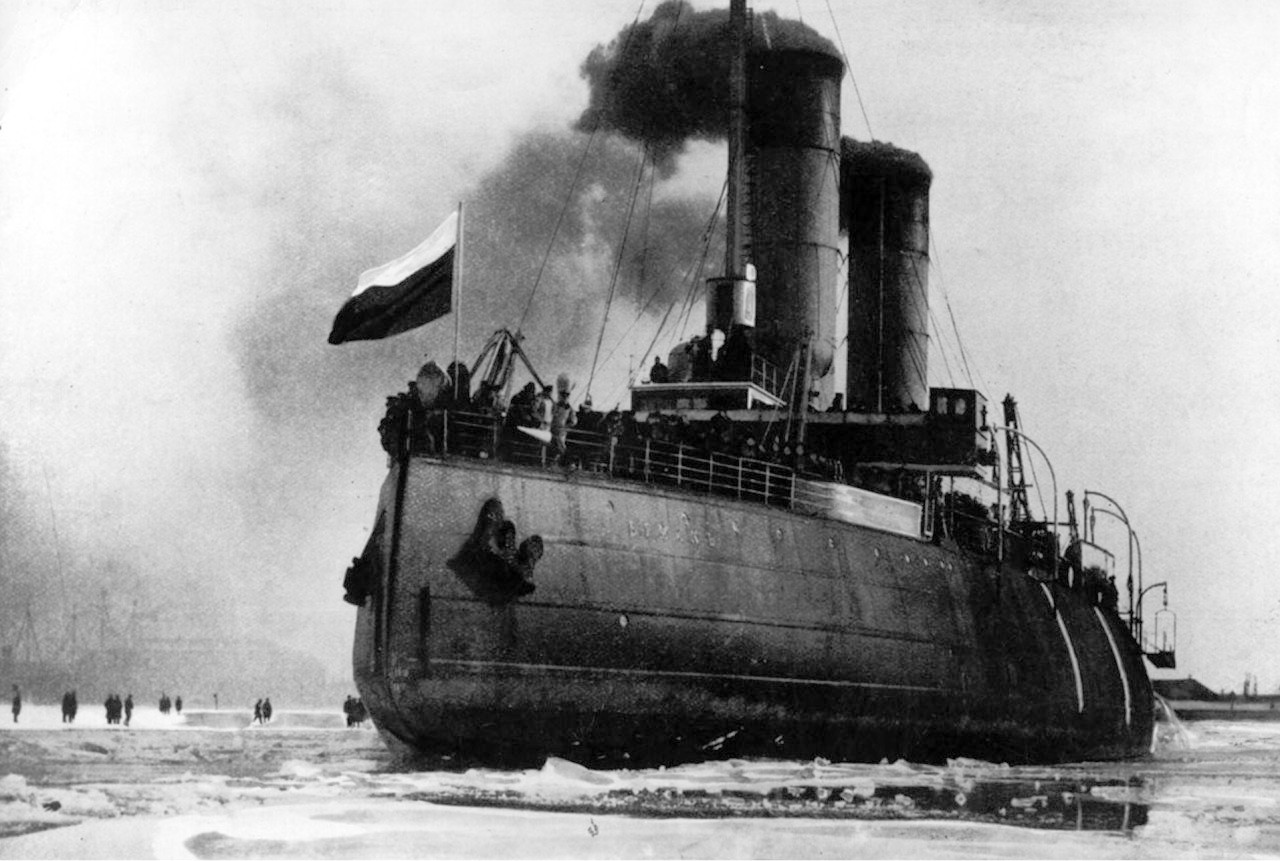
Steam-powered icebreaker Yermak

The following icebreakers were powered by steam;

- Pilot (built in 1862; modified and operated as an icebreaker: 1864–1890; broken up?)
- Ledokol 1 (1890–1915; later converted to a gunboat)
- Ledokol 2 (1895–1923; handed over to Latvia)
- Saratovskiy Ledokol (1895–1968; sunk)
- Nadeshnyy (1897–1924; later converted to a gunboat)
- Yermak (1899–1963; scrapped, despite efforts to preserve it as a museum piece)
- Gaydamak (1898–1930; broken up)
- Ledokol 3 (1899–1923; broken up)
- Ledokol IV (1907–1942; sunk by Germans)
- A. Sibiryakov (1909–1942; sunk by Germans)
- Vaygach (1909–1918; sank in 1918)
- Taymyr (1909–1950s?; broken up)
- Silatch (1910–1918, 1922–late 1950s; broken up)
- Malygin (1912–1940; sunk in 1940)
- Volynets (1914–1918, 1940–1985; ex-Tsar' Mikhail Fyodorovich, ex-Wäinämöinen, ex-Suur Tõll; sold to Estonia in 1987)
- Fyodor Litke (1914–1958; ex-CGC Earl Grey; broken up)
- Georgiy Sedov (1915–1967; ex-Beothic (1909–1915); broken up)
- Sadko (1915–1941; ex-Lintrose (1912–1915); sank in 1941)
- Mikula Seleaninovich (1916–1918)
- Ledokol V (1916–1941; sank in 1941)
- Ledokol VI (1916–1961; broken up)
- Ledokol VII (1916–1954; broken up)
- Ledokol VIII (1917–1961; broken up)
- Ledokol IX (1917–1932; sank in White Sea)
- Krasin (1917–1971; extensively rebuilt in 1953–1960, now a museum ship in St. Petersburg)
- Lenin (1917–1968; broken up)
- Stepan Makarov (1917–1941; sunk)
- Toros (1929–1964)
- Sibir (1938–1973; ex-I. Stalin (−1961); broken up)
- Admiral Lazarev (1938–1967; ex-L. Kaganovich (−1951); broken up)
- Admiral Makarov (1941–1967; ex-V. Molotov (−1956); broken up)
- A. Mikoyan (1941–1968; broken up)
- Malygin (1945–1970; ex-Voima; broken up)
- Sibiryakov (1945–1972; ex-Jääkarhu; broken up)
- Alyosha Popovich (1945–1970; ex-Eisvogel; decommissioned and abandoned off Russky Island)
- Ilya Muromets (1946–1979; ex-Eisbär; broken up in 1981)
- Peresvet (1951–1980; ex-Castor; decommissioned and abandoned off Reyneke Island)
