= Sibir (icebreaker) =

Three icebreaking ships have been named Sibir:

- Sibir (1937 icebreaker), a Soviet icebreaker launched in 1937 as I. Stalin and later renamed
- Sibir (1977 icebreaker), a Soviet Arktika-class nuclear-powered icebreaker in service from 1977 until 1992
- Sibir (2017 icebreaker), a Russian Project 22220 icebreaker which entered service in 2021
