= Ural (icebreaker) =

Russian nuclear icebreaker

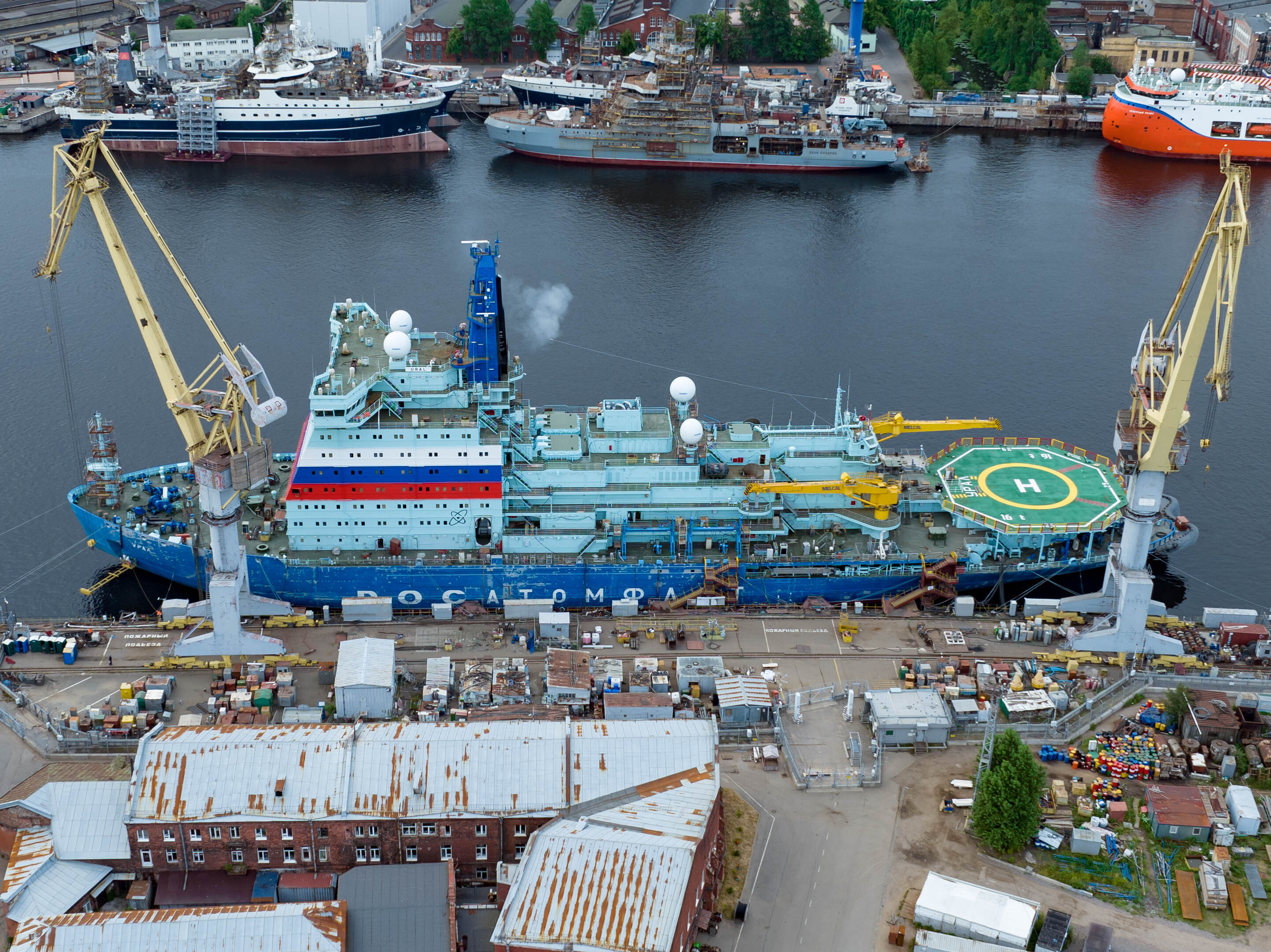
- Ural at the mooring wall of Baltic Shipyard in July 2022

History

Russia
- Name: Ural (Урал)
- Namesake: Ural Mountains
- Operator: FSUE Atomflot
- Port of registry: Murmansk
- Ordered: 13 March 2012
- Builder: Baltic Shipyard, Saint Petersburg
- Cost: RUB 84.4 billion (for two vessels)
- Yard number: 05708
- Laid down: 25 July 2016
- Launched: 27 May 2019
- Sponsored by: Elvira Nabiullina
- Completed: 2020 (contract date); 22 November 2022 (delivery)
- Identification: IMO number: 9658642; MMSI number: 273618600; Call sign: UBKO
- Status: In service

General characteristics
- Class & type: Project 22220 icebreaker
- Tonnage: 28,494 GT; 8,548 NT; 7,131 DWT
- Displacement: 32,747 t (32,230 long tons)
- Length: 172.7 m (567 ft)
- Beam: 34 m (112 ft)
- Height: 51.25 m (168 ft)
- Draft: 10.5 m (34 ft) (dwl); 9.00 m (30 ft) (minimum; achievable); 8.65 m (28 ft) (minimum; official); 8.50 m (28 ft) (minimum; design)
- Depth: 15.2 m (50 ft)
- Ice class: RMRS Icebreaker9
- Installed power: Two RITM-200 nuclear reactors (2 × 175 MWt); Two turbogenerators (2 × 36 MWe)
- Propulsion: Nuclear-turbo-electric; Three shafts (3 × 20 MW)
- Speed: 22 knots (41 km/h; 25 mph); 1.5–2 knots (2.8–3.7 km/h; 1.7–2.3 mph) in 2.8 m (9 ft) ice
- Endurance: 7 years (reactor fuel); 6 months (provisions)
- Crew: 75
- Aviation facilities: Helideck and hangar

Ural (Russian: Урал) is a Russian Project 22220 nuclear-powered icebreaker. Built by Baltic Shipyard in Saint Petersburg, the vessel was laid down in 2016, launched in 2019 and delivered in 2022.

== Development and construction ==
=== Background ===
In the late 1980s, the Russian research institutes and design bureaus developed a successor for the 1970s Arktika-class nuclear-powered icebreakers as part of a wider icebreaker fleet renewal program initiated shortly after the dissolution of the Soviet Union. The new 60-megawatt icebreaker, referred to using a type size series designation LK-60Ya, (Note: The type size series designation "LK-60Ya" (Russian: ЛК-60Я) comes from the Russian language word for "icebreaker" (Russian: ледокол, romanized: ledokol), propulsion power (60 megawatts), and the first letter of the Russian word for "nuclear" (Russian: ядерное, romanized: yadernoye).) would feature a so-called dual-draft functionality which would allow the vessel to operate in shallow coastal areas after de-ballasting. Although the preliminary designs had been developed almost two decades earlier, the LK-60Ya design was finalized in 2009 as Project 22220 by Central Design Bureau "Iceberg" and the construction of the first vessel was awarded to Saint Petersburg-based Baltic Shipyard in August 2012. Three additional contracts in May 2014, August 2019 and February 2023 have increased the number of Project 22220 icebreakers under construction or on order to seven.

=== Construction ===
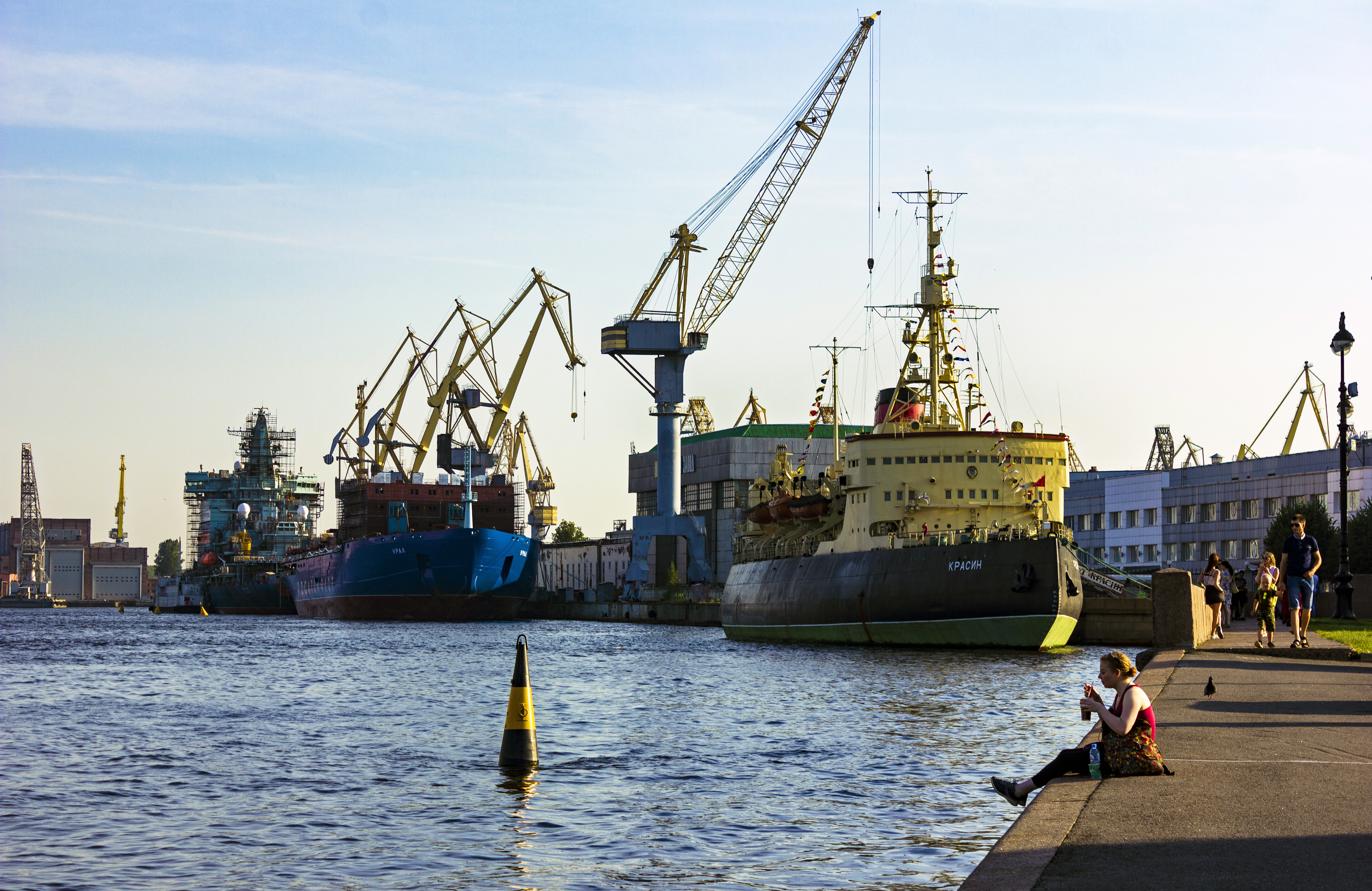
Ural under construction at Baltic Shipyard in July 2019 with another Project 22220 icebreaker in the background

The tender for construction of two additional Project 22220 nuclear-powered icebreakers, referred to as the first and second serial vessels of the project, was announced at the keel laying ceremony of the lead ship Arktika on 5 November 2013. On 8 May 2014, the 84.4 billion ruble (about US$2.4 billion) contract for two vessels was awarded to the Saint Petersburg-based Baltic Shipyard which was the only company whose bid had been accepted.

The keel of the third Project 22220 icebreaker was laid on 25 July 2016, shortly after the partially-assembled hull of the previous vessel, Sibir, had been moved down the slipway for final hull assembly. Unlike in the previous two vessels, the RITM-200 nuclear reactors were lifted onboard the vessel while it was still on the slipway. By February 2019, the hull of the new icebreaker had been constructed up to the 40 millimetres (1.6 in) thick ice belt level, and the vessel was launched as Ural on 27 May 2019. The name had previously been selected for the final Arktika-class icebreaker when it was laid down in 1989, but during construction the vessel was renamed 50 Let Pobedy (Russian: 50 лет Победы, lit. '50 Years of Victory').

Initially, the delivery of the third Project 22220 nuclear-powered icebreaker was scheduled for 2020, but this has since been postponed to 2022 due to problems with the delivery of the steam turbines from a domestic manufacturer.

On 26 May 2020, Ural's level of technical readiness was reported to be 50 %.

In February 2021, there was a minor fire onboard the icebreaker.

Ural left for the sea trials on 14 October 2022 and returned to the shipyard on 31 October, having reportedly finished factory sea trials in record time.

The flag-raising ceremony marking Ural's entry to service was held on 22 November 2022. The icebreaker left for its homeport, Murmansk, on the following day and arrived there on 30 November. On 2 December, the icebreaker departed for its first operational icebreaking mission to the Kara Sea.

== Career ==
After the icebreaking season, Ural sailed back to the Baltic Sea for scheduled repairs at Kronstadt Marine Plant which is the nearest Russian dry dock that can accommodate a vessel of this size. The repairs were completed in late October.

== Design ==
Ural is 172.7 metres (567 ft) long overall and has a maximum beam of 34 metres (112 ft). Designed to operate efficiently both in shallow Arctic river estuaries as well as along the Northern Sea Route, the draught of the vessel can be varied between about 9 and 10.5 metres (30 and 34 ft) by taking in and discharging ballast water, with displacement up to 32,747 tonnes (32,230 long tons).

Ural has a nuclear-turbo-electric powertrain. The onboard nuclear power plant consists of two 175 MWt RITM-200 pressurized water reactors fueled by up to 20% enriched Uranium-235 and two 36 MWe turbogenerators. The propulsion system follows the classic polar icebreaker pattern with three 6.2-metre (20 ft) four-bladed propellers driven by 20-megawatt (27,000 hp) electric motors. With a total propulsion power of 60 megawatts (80,000 hp), Ural is designed to be capable of breaking 2.8 metres (9 ft) thick level ice at a continuous speed of 1.5–2 knots (2.8–3.7 km/h; 1.7–2.3 mph) at full power when operating in deep water at design draught.
