= Arktika (icebreaker) =

Two ships have been named Arktika, Russian for the Arctic:

- Arktika (1972 icebreaker), the lead ship of Russian Arktika-class icebreakers, launched in 1972 and entered service in 1975. She was retired in October 2008.
- Arktika (2016 icebreaker), the lead ship of Russian Project 22220 icebreakers, launched in 2016 and entered service in 2020
