= Leningrad (icebreaker) =

Leningrad (Russian: Ленинград) has been the name of the following icebreakers:

- Leningrad (1959 icebreaker), a Soviet and later Russian diesel-electric icebreaker in service in 1961–1993
- Leningrad (2028 icebreaker), a Russian nuclear-powered icebreaker under construction
