= Yakutia (disambiguation) =

Yakutia or Sakha Republic is federal subject of Russia.

Yakutia or Yakutiya may also refer to:

- Yakutia (1918), a short-lived republic
- Yakut Autonomous Soviet Socialist Republic (1922–1992)
- Yakutia Airlines, an airline based in Yakutsk
- 2607 Yakutia, a minor planet belonging to the Nysa family of asteroids
- Yakutiya (icebreaker), Russian icebreaker
