= Stalingrad (icebreaker) =

Russian nuclear icebreaker

History

Russia
- Name: Stalingrad (Сталинград)
- Namesake: Battle of Stalingrad
- Operator: FSUE Atomflot
- Ordered: 2 February 2023
- Builder: Baltic Shipyard, Saint Petersburg
- Laid down: 18 November 2025
- Completed: December 2030 (planned)
- Identification: IMO number: 1022964
- Status: Under construction

General characteristics
- Class & type: Project 22220 icebreaker
- Displacement: 33,530 t (33,000 long tons) (dwl); 25,540 t (25,140 long tons) (minimum)
- Length: 173.3 m (569 ft) (overall); 160.0 m (525 ft) (dwl)
- Beam: 34 m (112 ft) (maximum); 33 m (108 ft) (dwl)
- Height: 51.25 m (168 ft)
- Draft: 10.5 m (34 ft) (dwl); 9.00 m (30 ft) (minimum; achievable); 8.65 m (28 ft) (minimum; official); 8.50 m (28 ft) (minimum; design)
- Depth: 15.2 m (50 ft)
- Ice class: RMRS Icebreaker9
- Installed power: Two RITM-200 nuclear reactors (2 × 175 MWt); Two turbogenerators (2 × 36 MWe)
- Propulsion: Nuclear-turbo-electric; Three shafts (3 × 20 MW)
- Speed: 22 knots (41 km/h; 25 mph); 1.5–2 knots (2.8–3.7 km/h; 1.7–2.3 mph) in 2.8 m (9 ft) ice
- Endurance: 7 years (reactor fuel); 6 months (provisions)
- Crew: 75
- Aviation facilities: Helideck and hangar

Stalingrad (Russian: Сталинград) is a Russian Project 22220 nuclear-powered icebreaker under construction at Baltic Shipyard in Saint Petersburg.

== Development and construction ==
=== Background ===
In the late 1980s, the Russian research institutes and design bureaus developed a successor for the 1970s Arktika-class nuclear-powered icebreakers as part of a wider icebreaker fleet renewal program initiated shortly after the dissolution of the Soviet Union. The new 60-megawatt icebreaker, referred to using a type size series designation LK-60Ya, (Note: The type size series designation "LK-60Ya" (Russian: ЛК-60Я) comes from the Russian language word for "icebreaker" (Russian: ледокол, romanized: ledokol), propulsion power (60 megawatts), and the first letter of the Russian word for "nuclear" (Russian: ядерное, romanized: yadernoye).) would feature a so-called dual-draft functionality which would allow the vessel to operate in shallow coastal areas after de-ballasting. Although the preliminary designs had been developed almost two decades earlier, the LK-60Ya design was finalized in 2009 as Project 22220 by Central Design Bureau "Iceberg" and the construction of the first vessel was awarded to Saint Petersburg-based Baltic Shipyard in August 2012. Three additional contracts in May 2014, August 2019 and February 2023 have increased the number of Project 22220 icebreakers under construction or on order to seven.

=== Construction and career ===
On 2 February 2023, FSUE Atomflot signed a contract for the construction of two additional Project 22220 icebreakers with Baltic Shipyard.

The construction of the seventh Project 22220 icebreaker began with a steel cutting ceremony on 7 April 2025 and the keel was laid on 18 November 2025. The vessel is expected to enter service by December 2030.

The new icebreaker was initially to be named Sakhalin (Russian: Сахалин) after the Sakhalin island, but in November 2023 it was announced that instead it would be named Stalingrad (Russian: Сталинград) to commemorate the Battle of Stalingrad. It is the first Soviet or Russian icebreaker to bear the previous name of the present-day Volgograd which was awarded the Soviet title of Hero City in 1965.

== Design ==
Stalingrad will be 173.3 metres (569 ft) long overall and have a maximum beam of 34 metres (112 ft). Designed to operate efficiently both in shallow Arctic river estuaries as well as along the Northern Sea Route, the draught of the vessel can be varied between about 9 and 10.5 metres (30 and 34 ft) by taking in and discharging ballast water, corresponding to a displacement between 25,540 and 33,530 tonnes (25,140 and 33,000 long tons).

Stalingrad will feature a nuclear-turbo-electric powertrain. The onboard nuclear power plant will consist of two 175 MWt RITM-200 pressurized water reactors fueled by up to 20% enriched Uranium-235 and two 36 MWe turbogenerators. The propulsion system will follow the classic polar icebreaker pattern with three 6.2-metre (20 ft) four-bladed propellers driven by 20-megawatt (27,000 hp) electric motors. With a total propulsion power of 60 megawatts (80,000 hp), Stalingrad is designed to be capable of breaking 2.8 metres (9 ft) thick level ice at a continuous speed of 1.5–2 knots (2.8–3.7 km/h; 1.7–2.3 mph) at full power when operating in deep water at design draught.
