= Nuclear-powered icebreaker =

Type of ship

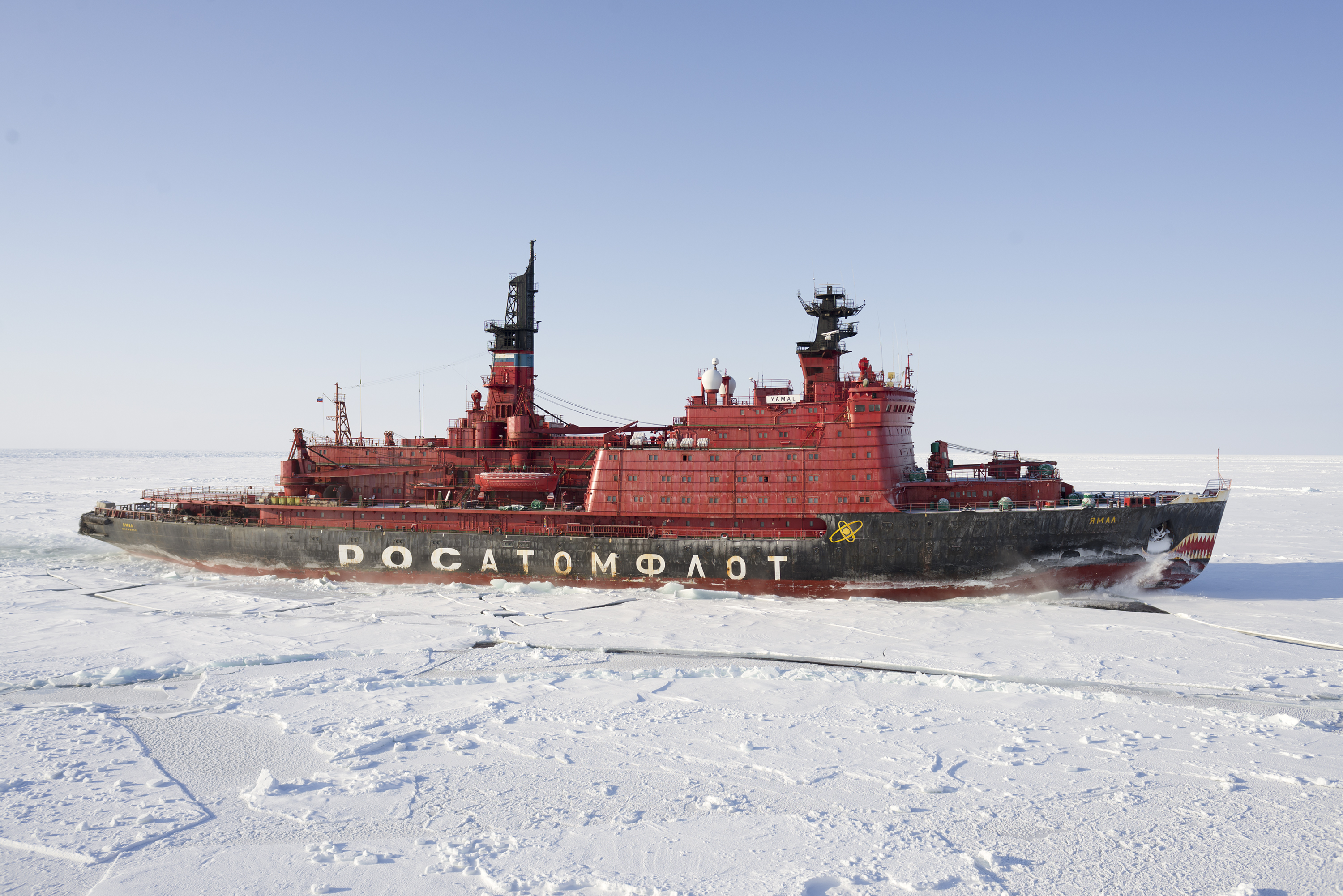
Nuclear icebreaker Yamal, 2015

A nuclear-powered icebreaker is an icebreaker with an onboard nuclear power plant that produces power for the vessel's propulsion system. Although more expensive to operate, nuclear-powered icebreakers provide a number of advantages over their diesel-powered counterparts, especially along the Northern Sea Route where diesel-powered icebreaker operations are challenging due to the heavy power demand associated with icebreaking, limited refueling infrastructure along the Siberian coast, and the endurance required.

As of 2025, Russia is the only country that builds and operates nuclear-powered icebreakers, having built a number of such vessels to aid shipping along the Northern Sea Route and Russian arctic outposts since the Soviet era.

== History of nuclear-powered icebreakers ==
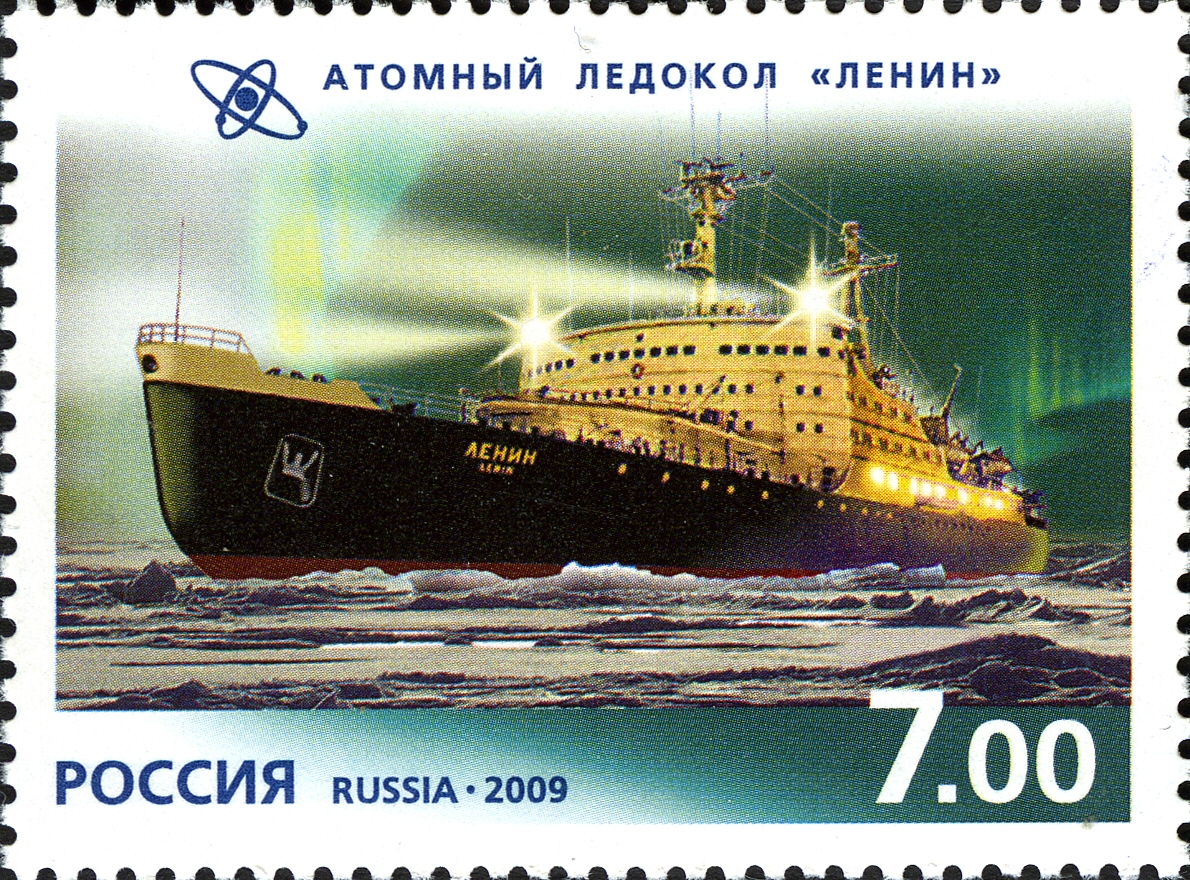
Nuclear-powered icebreaker Lenin

The first nuclear icebreaker was the Soviet vessel Lenin, which was launched in 1957 as the world’s first nuclear-powered surface vessel and the first civilian-operated nuclear vessel. An experimental nuclear-powered vessel, Lenin began icebreaking service along the Northern Sea Route in 1959 and continued to do so until 1989. From 1967 to 1971 Lenin was refurbished, with new capabilities developed in the process.

The second-generation nuclear-powered icebreakers, Arktika class (Project 10520 and 10521), utilized an improved reactor design and turbo-electric propulsion train to deliver significantly improved icebreaking performance, allowing the vessels to provide year-round icebreaking service along the Northern Sea Route and conduct voyages into the Arctic Ocean.

As natural gas exploration increased along the Siberian coast, the Murmansk Shipping Company (MSCO) found that the existing Arktika-class were challenging to operate within the shallow coastal deltas. To fill this capability gap, they ordered two slightly smaller shallow-draught icebreakers from Wärtsilä Marine Helsinki Shipyard in Finland and installed their nuclear powerplants at Baltic Shipbuilding in Leningrad (today St. Petersburg).

In the late 1980s, the Central Design Bureau "Iceberg" began designing a replacement for the Arktika- and Taymyr classes. The program called for a series of icebreaker designs ranging from smaller diesel-powered auxiliary icebreakers to two nuclear-powered icebreaker types, 60-megawatt "line icebreaker" (LK-60Ya) and 110-megawatt "icebreaker-leader" (LK-110Ya).

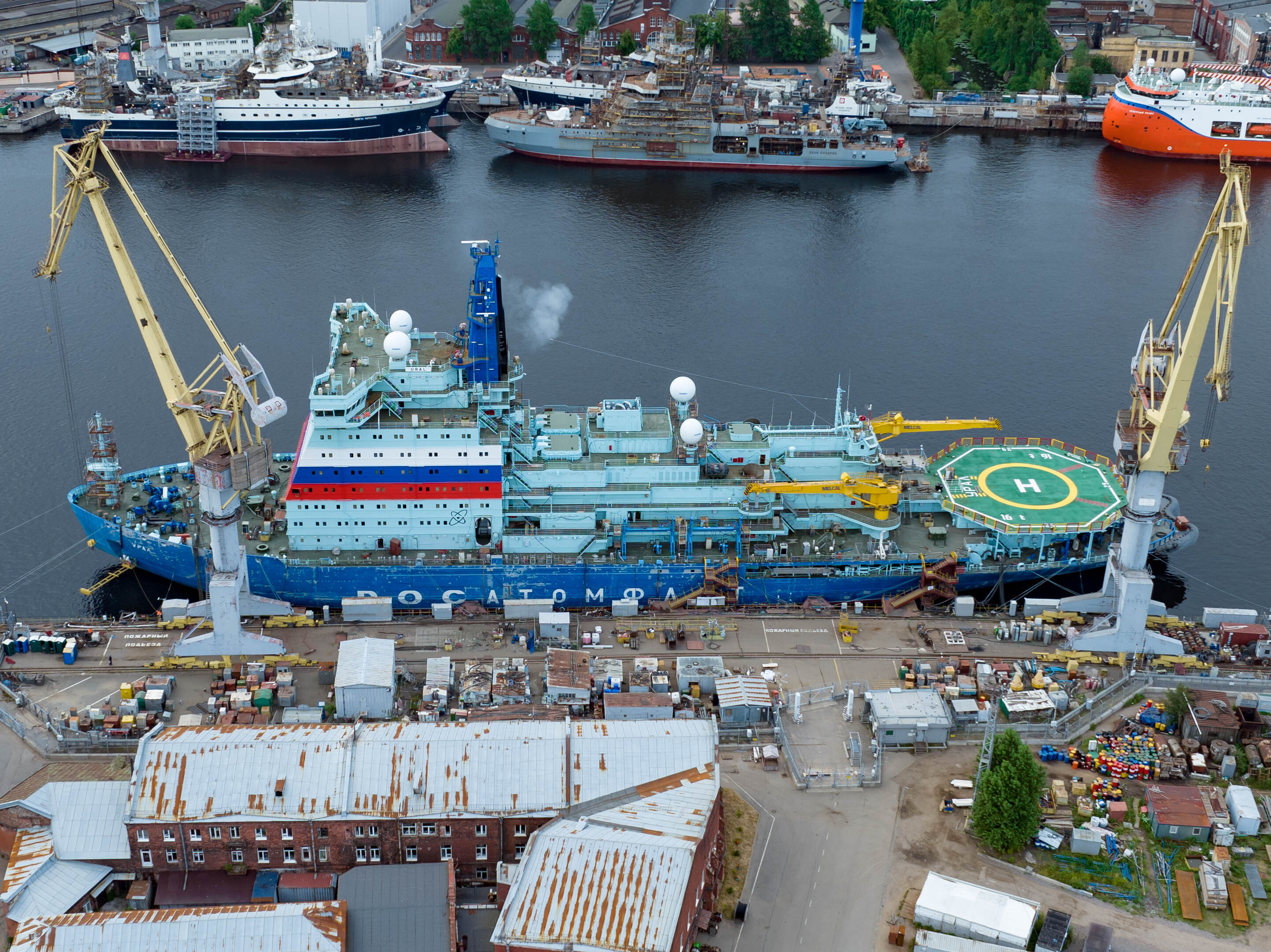
Project 22220 icebreaker Ural under construction

The LK-60Ya was realized as Project 22220, the first of which was laid down in 2013 and commissioned in 2020. Although similar in size and propulsion power to the preceding Arktika-class, Project 22220 is a dual-draft vessel capable of operating at 2 metres (6.6 ft) shallower draft, allowing it to perform roles of both Arktika- and Taymyr classes. The first LK-110Ya-type icebreaker, realized as Project 10510, was laid down in 2021. When completed, the lead vessel Rossiya will be the largest nuclear icebreaker in the world.

Although Russia has historically been the only country to build and operate nuclear-powered icebreakers, several other countries have expressed interest in doing so. In 2019, China announced plans that it would build a nuclear-powered icebreaker similar to the Russian Project 22220. As of 2025, construction on this proposed nuclear icebreaker has not commenced.

== Use of nuclear-powered icebreakers ==
=== Commercial icebreaking ===
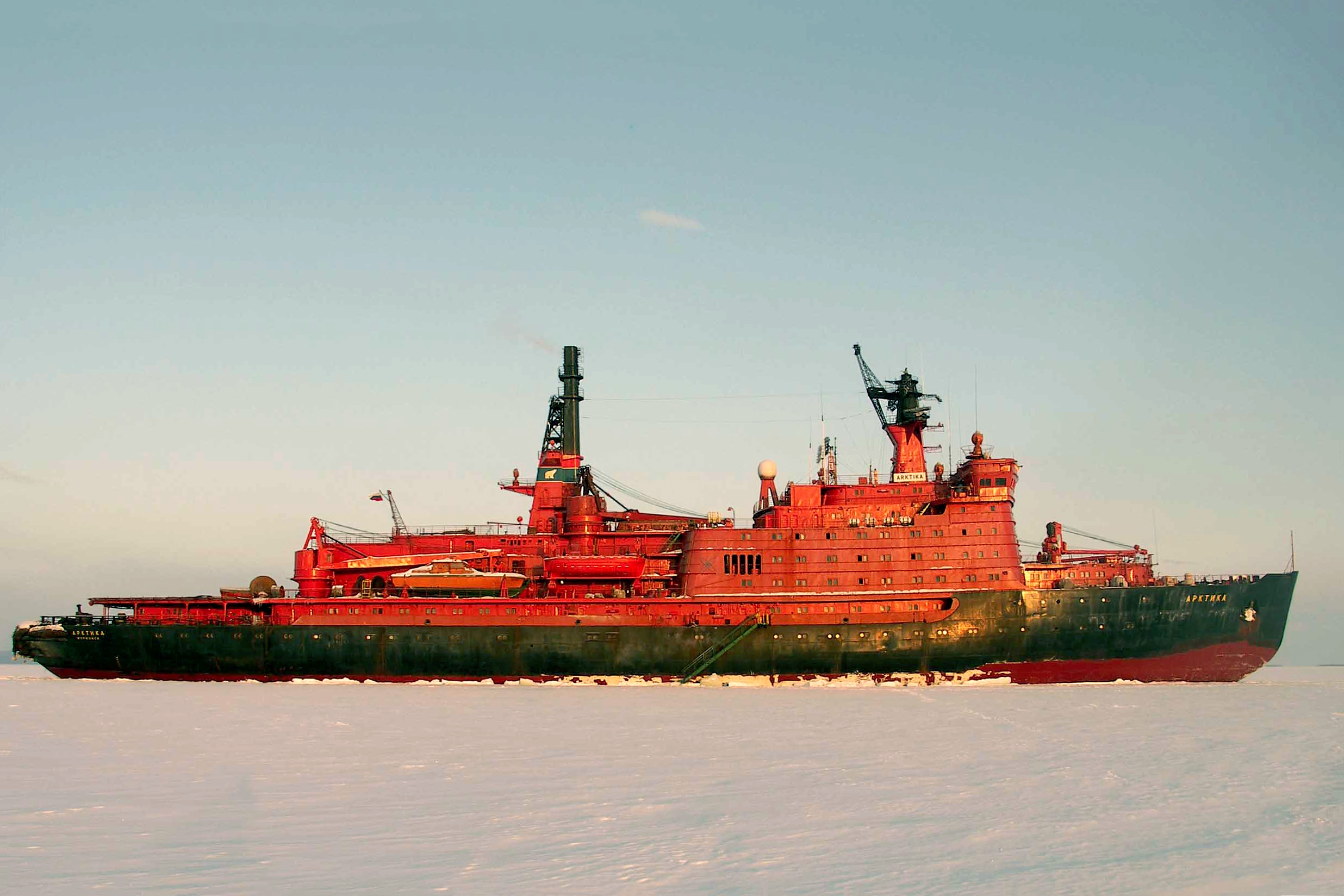
The 1975-built Arktika, the first surface ship to reach the North Pole, during a 2006 cruise

The Northern Sea Route runs along the Siberian coast from the principal ports of Murmansk to Petropavlovsk and Vladivostok. The route includes sections of the Barents Sea, the Pechora Sea, the Kara Sea, the Laptev Sea, and the Eastern Siberian Sea to the Bering Strait. It provides the only feasible means to deliver heavy equipment, such as natural gas production modules or military vehicles, to communities along the Siberian coast and the Russian Arctic islands. Key ports served along the Siberian coast are Dikson, Tiksi, Pevek, and the Yamal Peninsula.

During the winter, the ice along the Northern Sea Route varies in thickness from 1.2 to 2.0 metres (3.9 to 6.6 ft). The ice in central parts of the Arctic Ocean is on average 2.5 metres (8.2 ft) thick. Nuclear-powered icebreakers can force through this ice at speeds up to 3 knots (5.6 km/h; 3.5 mph). In ice-free waters, the maximum speed of the nuclear-powered icebreakers is as much as 22 knots (41 km/h; 25 mph).

Two types of nuclear-powered icebreakers are used along the Northern Sea Route: the heavy Arktika-class and shallow draft Taymyr-class. With a draft of 11 metres (36 ft) the Arktika-class vessels are unable to navigate the shallow river deltas leading to several key Siberian ports. The smaller Taymyr-class provides icebreaking service in these regions, particularly the Yenisei River to Dikson.

=== Scientific exploration ===
The icebreakers have also been used for a number of scientific expeditions in the Arctic. On August 17, 1977, Arktika was the first surface vessel in the world to reach the North Pole.

=== Arctic tourism ===
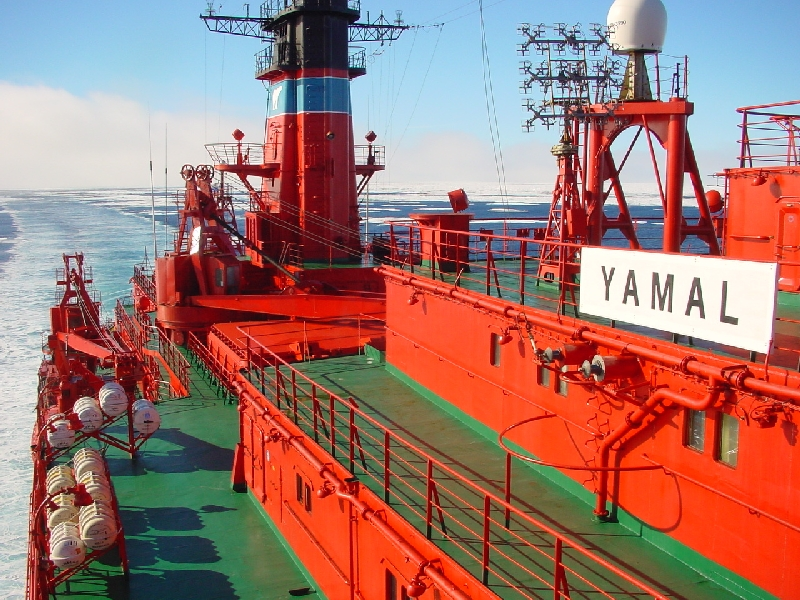
Yamal, August 2001

Since 1989 the Arktika-class nuclear-powered icebreakers have also been used to ferry tourists to the North Pole. Each participant pays up to US$25,000 for a cruise lasting three weeks. Sibir was used for the first two tourist cruises in 1989 and 1990. In 1991 and 1992, the tourist trips to the North Pole were undertaken by Sovetskiy Soyuz. During the summer of 1993, Yamal was used for three tourist expeditions in the Arctic. The last two vessel of the Arktika-class (Yamal and 50 Let Pobedy) contain a separate accommodation section for tourists.

Quark Expeditions chartered 50 Let Pobedy for expeditions to the North Pole in 2008. The vessel's maiden voyage to the North Pole embarked in Murmansk, on June 24, 2008. The ship carried 128 guests in 64 cabins in five categories. 50 Let Pobedy completed a total of three expeditions to the North Pole in 2008 for the polar adventure company. and offering it for a North Pole cruise.

== Nuclear-powered icebreaker classes ==
=== Russian nuclear-powered icebreaker fleet ===
Russia's nuclear-powered icebreaking fleet is owned by the federal government. Initially, the icebreakers were operated by the Murmansk Shipping Company (MSCO); however, in 2008 they were transferred to the state-owned corporation Rosatom and operated by the subsidiary Atomflot. Rosatom is also responsible for the safe navigation of vessels along the Northern Sea Route.

==== Icebreakers ====
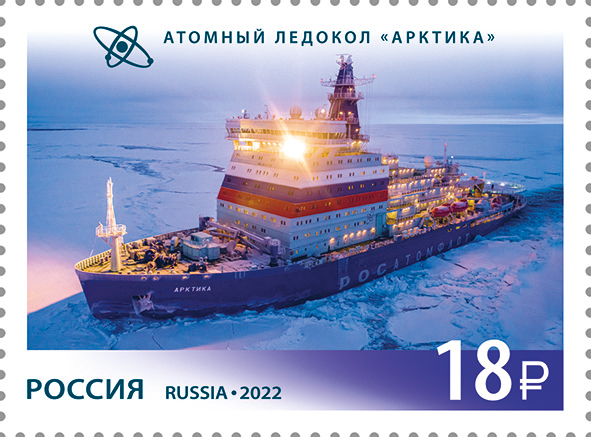
Lead ship of the Project 22220 Arktika-class, Arktika

- Lenin: an experimental 16,000 tonne, 134 meter long icebreaker commissioned in 1957. The Lenin was initially powered by three OK-150 (90 MWt) nuclear reactors, which were replaced with two OK-900 (171 MWt) reactors in 1971. Lenin was decommissioned in 1989 and has since been converted to a museum ship in its former homeport of Murmansk.
- Arktika class (Project 10520 and 10521): six 24,000 tonne, 148 meter long heavy icebreakers commissioned from 1977 to 2007. The Arktika-class icebreakers are powered by two OK-900A (171 MWt) nuclear reactors with turbo-electric propulsion driving three propellers. Only two of the initial six vessels remain in active service.
- Taymyr class (Project 10580): two 20,800 tonne, 152 meter long shallow draft icebreakers commissioned from 1987 to 1989. The Taymyr-class is powered by one KLT-40M nuclear reactor (171 MWt) with turbo-electric propulsion driving three propellers.
- Project 22220: 33,000 tonne, 173 meter long heavy icebreakers currently under construction at Baltic Shipyard which will replace the previous Arktika- and Taymyr-classes. As of November 2025, four vessels have been completed and an additional three are under construction. Project 22220 icebreakers are powered by two RITM-200 (175 MWt) nuclear reactors with turbo-electric propulsion driving three propellers.
- Project 10510: a 69,700 tonne, 209 meter long heavy icebreakers currently under construction at Zvezda Shipyard to augment Project 22220. As of February 2025, one hull is under construction. The vessel will be powered by two RITM-400 nuclear reactors (315 MWt) with turbo-electric propulsion driving four propellers.

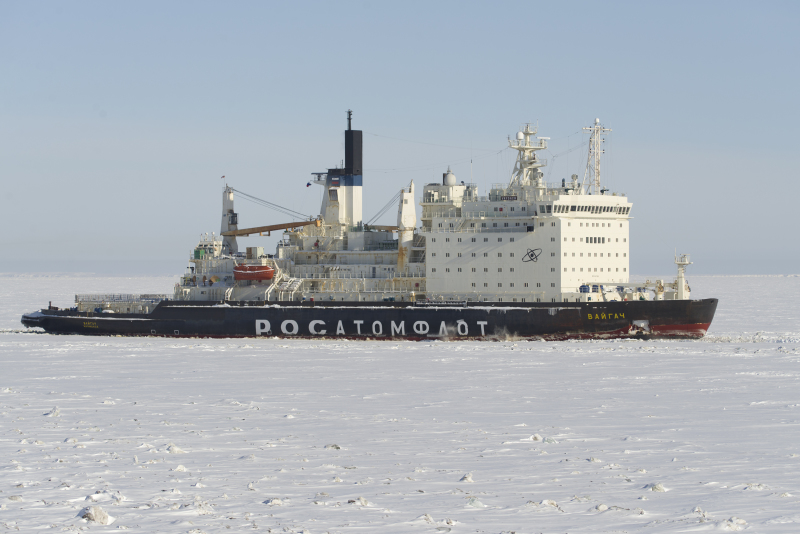
Shallow-draught icebreaker Vaygach.

==== Ice-strengthened cargo ship ====
- Sevmorput: a 61,900 tonne, 260 meter long ice-strengthened LASH cargo ship commissioned in 1988. The Sevmorput is powered by one KLT-40 (135 MWt) nuclear reactor and a steam turbine-driven controllable pitch propeller.

== List of nuclear-powered icebreakers ==
Ship name	In service	Status	Project number	Class	Comments
Lenin	1959–1989	Decommissioned	92	—	Converted to museum ship in Murmansk
Arktika	1975–2008	Decommissioned	10520	Arktika	Reactors removed; awaiting scrapping
Sibir	1977–1992	Decommissioned	10520	Arktika	Reactors removed; awaiting scrapping
Rossiya	1985–2013	Decommissioned	10521	Arktika	Awaiting scrapping
Taymyr	1989–present	In service	10580	Taymyr	
Sovetskiy Soyuz	1990–2014	Decommissioned	10521	Arktika	Awaiting scrapping
Vaygach	1990–present	In service	10580	Taymyr	
Yamal	1993–present	In service	10521	Arktika	
50 Let Pobedy	2007–present	In service	10521	Arktika	Launched as Ural
Arktika	2020–present	In service	22220	Project 22220	
Sibir	2021–present	In service	22220	Project 22220	
Ural	2022–present	In service	22220	Project 22220	
Yakutiya	2024–present	In service	22220	Project 22220	
Chukotka	2026 (planned)	Under construction	22220	Project 22220	
Leningrad	2028 (planned)	Under construction	22220	Project 22220	
Stalingrad	2030 (planned)	Under construction	22220	Project 22220	
Rossiya	2030 (planned)	Under construction	10510	Project 10510	

== See also ==
- Arctic cooperation and politics – Between the eight Arctic nations
- Icebreakers of Russia
- List of civilian nuclear ships – Propulsion system for marine vessels utilizing a nuclear powerplant
- Nuclear marine propulsion – Propulsion system for marine vessels utilizing a nuclear powerplant
- Nuclear submarine – Submarine powered by a nuclear reactor
