= Atomflot =

Russian shipping company

- Type: Federal State Unitary Enterprise
- Industry: Nuclear icebreakers
- Headquarters: Murmansk, Russia
- Number of employees: ~2,000
- Parent: Rosatom
- Website: Official website (Russian)

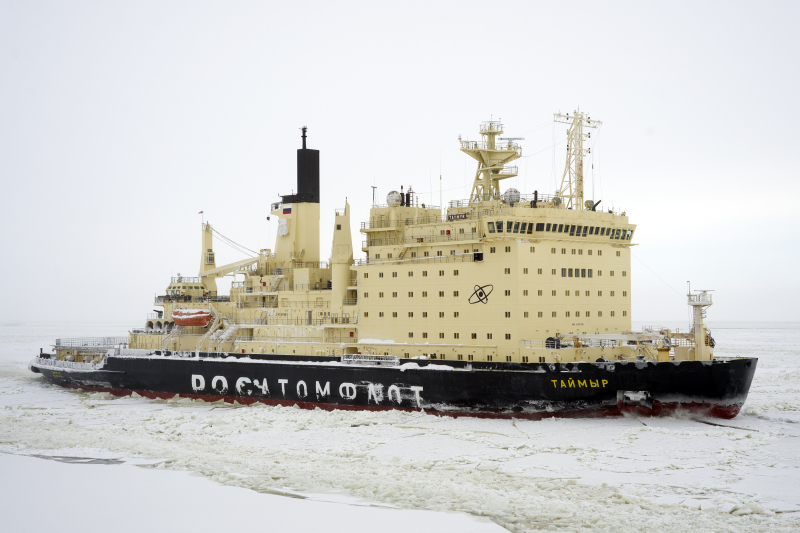
Taymyr-class icebreaker Taymyr

Atomflot (Russian: ФГУП «Атомфлот», translation: "Atom fleet") is a Russian company and service base that maintains the world's only fleet of nuclear-powered icebreakers. Atomflot is part of the Rosatom group, and is based in the city of Murmansk.

As of September 2025, the company operates a fleet of nine nuclear-powered icebreakers, including the world's largest, the Arktika, which joined the fleet on her maiden voyage.

The company employs between 1,000 and 2,000 people. The company has a ship to transport radioactive waste, and another to monitor radiation. It also maintains a museum ship, the Lenin.

== Sanctions ==
The company was sanctioned by Canada on 22 August 2023 for association with the Russian government.

== Activity ==
A total of about 1,000 people work on atomic icebreakers, nuclear light carriers, and ATOs (atomic technology services), all under the umbrella of Atomflot. The command staff undergoes special training at the Admiral Makarov State Maritime Academy in St. Petersburg. In addition to orchestrating cargo transportation along the Northern Sea Route, Atomflot organizes tourist cruises, the profit from which amounts to 6-7% of the company's total profit.

Nuclear icebreakers of Rosatomflot
In operation/Under construction			Decommissioned			
Name	Type	Year	Name	Type	Year	Notes
Sevmorput	-	1988–2007, 2016–present	Arktika	Arktika-class	1975–2008	Currently moored in Murmansk
Taymyr	Taymyr-class	1989–present	Sibir	Arktika-class	1977–1992	Currently moored in Murmansk
Vaygach	Taymyr-class	1990–present	Rossiya	Arktika-class	1985–2013	Laid up in Murmansk
Yamal	Arktika-class	1993–present	Sovetskiy Soyuz	Arktika-class	1989–2012	Laid up in Murmansk; to be converted to a command ship
50 Let Pobedy	Arktika-class	2007–present				
Arktika	Project 22220	2020–present				
Sibir	Project 22220	2022–present				
Ural	Project 22220	2022–present				
Yakutia	Project 22220	2024–present				
Chukotka	Project 22220	2027 (planned)				
Rossiya	Project 10510	2030 (planned)				

== See also ==
- Icebreakers of Russia
