= Yakutiya (icebreaker) =

Russian nuclear icebreaker

History

Russia
- Name: Yakutiya (Yakutiya)
- Namesake: Republic of Sakha (Yakutia)
- Operator: FSUE Atomflot
- Port of registry: Murmansk
- Ordered: 23 August 2019
- Builder: Baltic Shipyard, Saint Petersburg
- Cost: Over RUB 100 billion (for two vessels)
- Yard number: 05709
- Laid down: 26 May 2020
- Launched: 22 November 2022
- Sponsored by: Viktoria Abramchenko
- Completed: 6 March 2025
- Identification: IMO number: 9911202
- Status: In service

General characteristics
- Class & type: Project 22220 icebreaker
- Displacement: 33,530 t (33,000 long tons) (dwl); 25,540 t (25,140 long tons) (minimum)
- Length: 173.3 m (569 ft) (overall); 160.0 m (525 ft) (dwl)
- Beam: 34 m (112 ft) (maximum); 33 m (108 ft) (dwl)
- Height: 51.25 m (168 ft)
- Draft: 10.5 m (34 ft) (dwl); 9.00 m (30 ft) (minimum; achievable); 8.65 m (28 ft) (minimum; official); 8.50 m (28 ft) (minimum; design)
- Depth: 15.2 m (50 ft)
- Ice class: RMRS Icebreaker9
- Installed power: Two RITM-200 nuclear reactors (2 × 175 MWt); Two turbogenerators (2 × 36 MWe)
- Propulsion: Nuclear-turbo-electric; Three shafts (3 × 20 MW)
- Speed: 22 knots (41 km/h; 25 mph); 1.5–2 knots (2.8–3.7 km/h; 1.7–2.3 mph) in 2.8 m (9 ft) ice
- Endurance: 7 years (reactor fuel); 6 months (provisions)
- Crew: 75
- Aviation facilities: Helideck and hangar

Yakutiya (Russian: Якутия) is a Russian Project 22220 nuclear-powered icebreaker. Built by Baltic Shipyard in Saint Petersburg, the vessel was laid down in 2020, launched in 2022 and delivered in 2025.

== Development and construction ==
=== Background ===
In the late 1980s, the Russian research institutes and design bureaus developed a successor for the 1970s Arktika-class nuclear-powered icebreakers as part of a wider icebreaker fleet renewal program initiated shortly after the dissolution of the Soviet Union. The new 60-megawatt icebreaker, referred to using a type size series designation LK-60Ya, (Note: The type size series designation "LK-60Ya" (Russian: ЛК-60Я) comes from the Russian language word for "icebreaker" (Russian: ледокол, romanized: ledokol), propulsion power (60 megawatts), and the first letter of the Russian word for "nuclear" (Russian: ядерное, romanized: yadernoye).) would feature dual-draft functionality, which would allow the vessel to operate in shallow coastal areas after de-ballasting. Although the preliminary designs had been developed almost two decades earlier, the LK-60Ya design was finalized in 2009 as Project 22220 by Central Design Bureau "Iceberg" and the construction of the first vessel was awarded to Saint Petersburg-based Baltic Shipyard in August 2012. Three additional contracts in May 2014, August 2019 and February 2023 have increased the number of Project 22220 icebreakers under construction or on order to seven.

=== Construction ===
On 23 August 2019, FSUE Atomflot signed a contract worth over 100 billion rubles (about US$1.5 billion) for the construction of two additional Project 22220 icebreakers with Baltic Shipyard. As before, the Saint Petersburg-based shipyard was the only bidder for the construction of the nuclear-powered icebreakers.

The keel of the fourth Project 22220 icebreaker was laid on 26 May 2020 and the vessel was launched on 22 November 2022. The vessel left for sea trials on 1 December 2024.

The icebreaker, named Yakutiya (Russian: Якутия) after the Republic of Sakha (Yakutia), was reportedly delivered on 28 December 2024. However, instead of heading to the Arctic the vessel remained in the Gulf of Finland for additional trials and was also drydocked in Kronstadt in February 2025. Atomflot finally took delivery of the vessel on 6 March after a 34-day delay due to challenges related to the international sanctions against Russia.

== Career ==
Yakutiya left the shipyard's outfitting quay and headed for its home port, Murmansk, on 6 April 2025. After few months of service in the Arctic, the icebreaker returned to Saint Petersburg for repairs in early August and returned to Murmansk again in early December.

== Design ==
Yakutiya is 173.3 metres (569 ft) long overall and has a maximum beam of 34 metres (112 ft). Designed to operate efficiently both in shallow Arctic river estuaries as well as along the Northern Sea Route, the draught of the vessel can be varied between about 9 and 10.5 metres (30 and 34 ft) by taking in and discharging ballast water, corresponding to a displacement between 25,540 and 33,530 tonnes (25,140 and 33,000 long tons).

Yakutiya has a nuclear-turbo-electric powertrain. The onboard nuclear power plant consists of two 175 MWt RITM-200 pressurized water reactors fueled by up to 20% enriched Uranium-235 and two 36 MWe turbogenerators. The propulsion system follows the classic polar icebreaker pattern with three 6.2-metre (20 ft) four-bladed propellers driven by 20-megawatt (27,000 hp) electric motors. With a total propulsion power of 60 megawatts (80,000 hp), Yakutiya is designed to be capable of breaking 2.8 metres (9 ft) thick level ice at a continuous speed of 1.5–2 knots (2.8–3.7 km/h; 1.7–2.3 mph) at full power when operating in deep water at design draught.
