= Saratovskiy Ledokol =

Soviet icebreaker

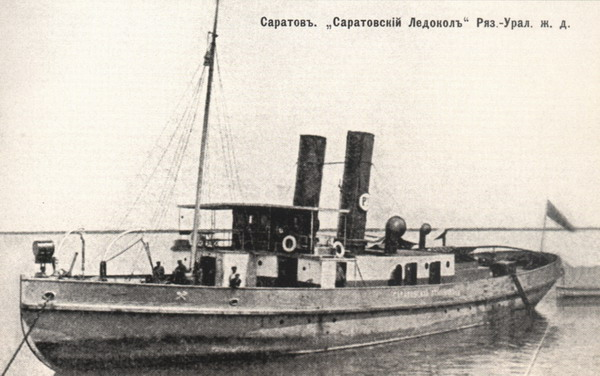

History

Russia/Soviet Union
- Name: Saratovskiy Ledokol (Саратовский ледокол)
- Owner: Ryazan-Ural Railway Company
- Port of registry: Saratov, Russia
- Builder: Sir WG Armstrong Mitchell & Company, Newcastle upon Tyne, United Kingdom
- Yard number: 627
- Launched: 7 May 1895
- In service: 1896–1968
- Fate: Sank in 1968

General characteristics
- Type: Icebreaker
- Displacement: 870 tons (standard); 1,000 tons (maximum)
- Length: 44.80 m (147 ft)
- Beam: 11.43 m (38 ft)
- Draft: 3.66 m (12 ft) (standard); 4.20 m (14 ft) (maximum)
- Boilers: Four oil-fired boilers
- Engines: Two compound steam engines, 1,420 ihp (total)
- Propulsion: Two propellers

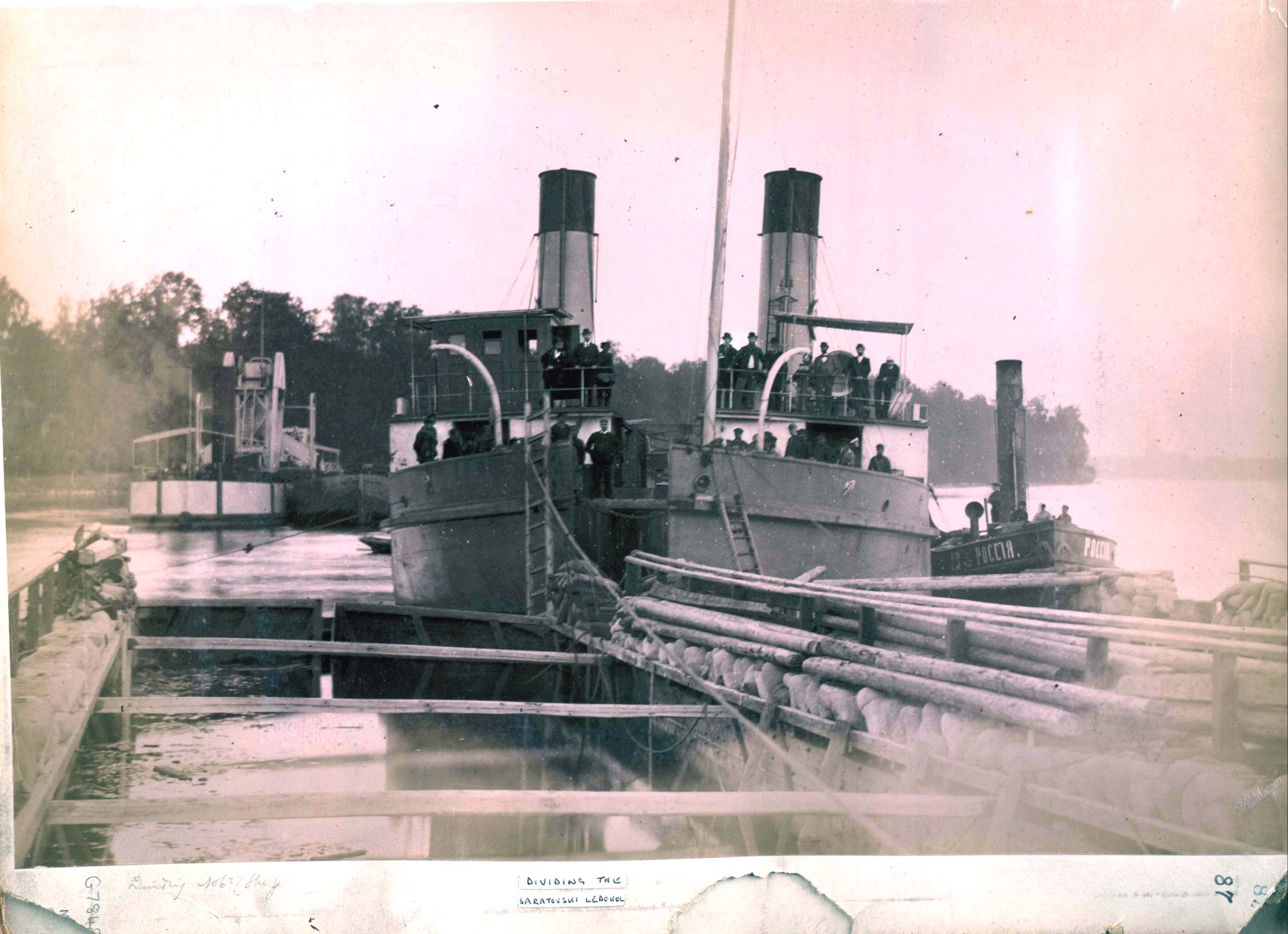
Saratovskiy Ledokol divided along the centerline for passing the Mariinsk Canal.

Saratovskiy Ledokol (Russian: Саратовский ледокол; literally: Saratov icebreaker) was a Russian steam-powered twin-screw icebreaker built for the Ryazan-Ural Railway Company at Sir WG Armstrong Mitchell & Company in Newcastle upon Tyne, United Kingdom, in 1896. She was primarily used to escort a railway ferry across Volga during the winter months, but could also carry cargo and passengers on her own. In order to be able to pass the Mariinsk Canal System with 28-foot (9 m) wide locks, Saratovskiy Ledokol could be split into two halves along the centerline, each with its own oil-fired boilers, compound steam engine, and smoke stack.

Saratovskiy Ledokol sank by the railway bridge in 1968. There are plans to lift the vessel and restore her as a monument by the river in 2021. The lifting operation commenced in June 2020. As of 2021, the salvage progress is unknown.
