= Leningrad (2028 icebreaker) =

Russian nuclear icebreaker

History

Russia
- Name: Leningrad (Ленинград)
- Namesake: Siege of Leningrad
- Operator: FSUE Atomflot
- Ordered: 2 February 2023
- Builder: Baltic Shipyard, Saint Petersburg
- Yard number: 05713
- Laid down: 26 January 2024
- Completed: December 2028 (planned)
- Identification: IMO number: 1022952
- Status: Under construction

General characteristics
- Class & type: Project 22220 icebreaker
- Displacement: 33,530 t (33,000 long tons) (dwl); 25,540 t (25,140 long tons) (minimum)
- Length: 173.3 m (569 ft) (overall); 160.0 m (525 ft) (dwl)
- Beam: 34 m (112 ft) (maximum); 33 m (108 ft) (dwl)
- Height: 51.25 m (168 ft)
- Draft: 10.5 m (34 ft) (dwl); 9.00 m (30 ft) (minimum; achievable); 8.65 m (28 ft) (minimum; official); 8.50 m (28 ft) (minimum; design)
- Depth: 15.2 m (50 ft)
- Ice class: RMRS Icebreaker9
- Installed power: Two RITM-200 nuclear reactors (2 × 175 MWt); Two turbogenerators (2 × 36 MWe)
- Propulsion: Nuclear-turbo-electric; Three shafts (3 × 20 MW)
- Speed: 22 knots (41 km/h; 25 mph); 1.5–2 knots (2.8–3.7 km/h; 1.7–2.3 mph) in 2.8 m (9 ft) ice
- Endurance: 7 years (reactor fuel); 6 months (provisions)
- Crew: 75
- Aviation facilities: Helideck and hangar

Leningrad (Russian: Ленинград) is a Russian Project 22220 nuclear-powered icebreaker currently under construction at Baltic Shipyard in Saint Petersburg.

== Development and construction ==
=== Background ===
In the late 1980s, the Russian research institutes and design bureaus developed a successor for the 1970s Arktika-class nuclear-powered icebreakers as part of a wider icebreaker fleet renewal program initiated shortly after the dissolution of the Soviet Union. The new 60-megawatt icebreaker, referred to using a type size series designation LK-60Ya, (Note: The type size series designation "LK-60Ya" (Russian: ЛК-60Я) comes from the Russian language word for "icebreaker" (Russian: ледокол, romanized: ledokol), propulsion power (60 megawatts), and the first letter of the Russian word for "nuclear" (Russian: ядерное, romanized: yadernoye).) would feature a so-called dual-draft functionality which would allow the vessel to operate in shallow coastal areas after de-ballasting. Although the preliminary designs had been developed almost two decades earlier, the LK-60Ya design was finalized in 2009 as Project 22220 by Central Design Bureau "Iceberg" and the construction of the first vessel was awarded to Saint Petersburg-based Baltic Shipyard in August 2012. Three additional contracts in May 2014, August 2019 and February 2023 have increased the number of Project 22220 icebreakers under construction or on order to seven.

=== Construction ===
On 2 February 2023, FSUE Atomflot signed a contract for the construction of two additional Project 22220 icebreakers with Baltic Shipyard.

The keel of the sixth Project 22220 icebreaker was laid on 26 January 2024. The vessel was initially to be named Kamchatka (Russian: Камчатка) after the Kamchatka Peninsula, but in November 2023 it was announced that instead it would be named Leningrad (Russian: Ленинград) to commemorate the Siege of Leningrad. It is the second Russian icebreaker to bear the name; the previous Leningrad was a Moskva-class diesel-electric polar icebreaker built in 1961 and decommissioned in 1993. Unlike the new nuclear-powered icebreaker, the Soviet-era vessel was named after the city itself.

Whereas the preceding Project 22220 icebreakers have featured Atomflot's standard livery of dark blue hull and generally light blue superstructure with three decks painted after the flag of Russia, the artist's impression for the sixth vessel featured a new paint scheme: red hull with blue and white stripes at the upper deck edge, and a generally white superstructure with front bulkhead adorned with a blue-white silhouette of Leningrad under siege.

Leningrad's delivery is scheduled for December 2028.

== Design ==
Leningrad is 173.3 metres (569 ft) long overall and has a maximum beam of 34 metres (112 ft). Designed to operate efficiently both in shallow Arctic river estuaries as well as along the Northern Sea Route, the draught of the vessel can be varied between about 9 and 10.5 metres (30 and 34 ft) by taking in and discharging ballast water, corresponding to a displacement between 25,540 and 33,530 tonnes (25,140 and 33,000 long tons).

Leningrad has a nuclear-turbo-electric powertrain. The onboard nuclear power plant consists of two 175 MWt RITM-200 pressurized water reactors fueled by up to 20% enriched Uranium-235 and two 36 MWe turbogenerators. The propulsion system follows the classic polar icebreaker pattern with three 6.2-metre (20 ft) four-bladed propellers driven by 20-megawatt (27,000 hp) electric motors. With a total propulsion power of 60 megawatts (80,000 hp), Leningrad is designed to be capable of breaking 2.8 metres (9 ft) thick level ice at a continuous speed of 1.5–2 knots (2.8–3.7 km/h; 1.7–2.3 mph) at full power when operating in deep water at design draught.
