= Sibir (2017 icebreaker) =

Russian nuclear icebreaker

History

Russia
- Name: Sibir (Сибирь)
- Namesake: Russian for Siberia
- Operator: FSUE Atomflot
- Builder: Baltic Shipyard, Saint Petersburg
- Cost: RUB 84.4 billion (for two vessels)
- Yard number: 05707
- Laid down: 26 May 2015
- Launched: 22 September 2017
- Sponsored by: Tatyana Golikova
- Completed: 2018 (contract date); 24 December 2021 (delivery)
- In service: January 2022–
- Identification: IMO number: 9774422; MMSI number: 273292320; Call sign: UBNV3
- Status: In service

General characteristics
- Class & type: Project 22220 icebreaker
- Tonnage: 28,494 GT; 8,548 NT; 7,154 DWT
- Displacement: 32,747 t (32,230 long tons)
- Length: 172.7 m (567 ft)
- Beam: 34 m (112 ft)
- Height: 51.25 m (168 ft)
- Draft: 10.5 m (34 ft) (dwl); 9.00 m (30 ft) (minimum; achievable); 8.65 m (28 ft) (minimum; official); 8.50 m (28 ft) (minimum; design)
- Depth: 15.2 m (50 ft)
- Ice class: RMRS Icebreaker9
- Installed power: Two RITM-200 nuclear reactors (2 × 175 MWt); Two turbogenerators (2 × 36 MWe)
- Propulsion: Nuclear-turbo-electric; Three shafts (3 × 20 MW)
- Speed: 22 knots (41 km/h; 25 mph); 1.5–2 knots (2.8–3.7 km/h; 1.7–2.3 mph) in 2.8 m (9 ft) ice
- Endurance: 7 years (reactor fuel); 6 months (provisions)
- Crew: 75
- Aviation facilities: Helideck and hangar

Sibir (Russian: Сибирь; literally: Siberia) is a Russian Project 22220 nuclear-powered icebreaker. Built by Baltic Shipyard in Saint Petersburg, the vessel was laid down in 2015, launched in 2017, and delivered in December 2021.

== Development and construction ==
=== Background ===
In the late 1980s, the Russian research institutes and design bureaus developed a successor for the 1970s Arktika-class nuclear-powered icebreakers as part of a wider icebreaker fleet renewal program initiated shortly after the dissolution of the Soviet Union. The new 60-megawatt icebreaker, referred to using a type size series designation LK-60Ya, (Note: The type size series designation "LK-60Ya" (Russian: ЛК-60Я) comes from the Russian language word for "icebreaker" (Russian: ледокол, romanized: ledokol), propulsion power (60 megawatts), and the first letter of the Russian word for "nuclear" (Russian: ядерное, romanized: yadernoye).) would feature a so-called dual-draft functionality which would allow the vessel to operate in shallow coastal areas after de-ballasting. Although the preliminary designs had been developed almost two decades earlier, the LK-60Ya design was finalized in 2009 as Project 22220 by Central Design Bureau "Iceberg" and the construction of the first vessel was awarded to Saint Petersburg-based Baltic Shipyard in August 2012. Three additional contracts in May 2014, August 2019 and February 2023 have increased the number of Project 22220 icebreakers under construction or on order to seven.

=== Construction ===
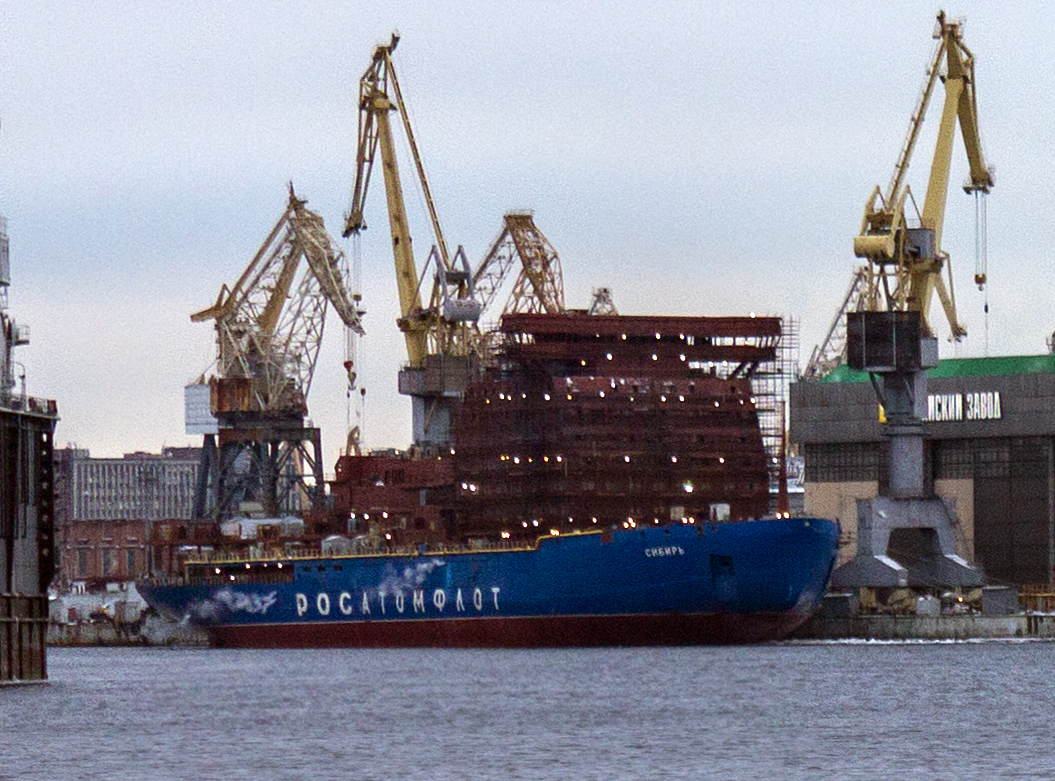
Sibir under construction at Baltic Shipyard in December 2018.

The tender for construction of two additional Project 22220 nuclear-powered icebreakers, referred to as the first and second serial vessels of the project, was announced at the keel laying ceremony of the lead ship Arktika on 5 November 2013. On 8 May 2014, the 84.4 billion ruble (about US$2.4 billion) contract for two vessels was awarded to the Saint Petersburg -based Baltic Shipyard, the only company whose bid had been accepted.

The keel of the second Project 22220 icebreaker was laid on 26 May 2015. After the launching of Arktika in June and in order to make way for the keel laying of the third icebreaker, the partially-assembled hull weighing about 3,500 tonnes (3,400 long tons) was moved about 125 metres (410 ft) along the slipway to the position where final hull construction would take place. The icebreaker was launched as Sibir, Russian for Siberia, on 22 September 2017. Previously, the name had been used on the second Arktika-class icebreaker that was in service in 1977–1992.

Initially, the delivery of the second Project 22220 nuclear-powered icebreaker was scheduled for 2018, but this had to be postponed due to problems with the delivery of the steam turbines from a domestic manufacturer.

Sibir left for first sea trials on 16 November 2021 and returned to Saint Petersburg on 30 November. The second sea trials were completed in December 2021. While some minor malfunctions were discovered, the icebreaker was delivered to Atomflot on 24 December 2021.

== Career ==
Sibir left Saint Petersburg on 13 January 2022 and, after a flag-raising ceremony in Murmansk on 25 January 2022, headed to the Kara Sea and Gulf of Ob to escort ships through the ice.

== Design ==
Sibir is 172.7 metres (567 ft) long overall and has a maximum beam of 34 metres (112 ft). Designed to operate efficiently both in shallow Arctic river estuaries as well as along the Northern Sea Route, the draught of the vessel can be varied between about 9 and 10.5 metres (30 and 34 ft) by taking in and discharging ballast water, with displacement up to 32,747 tonnes (32,230 long tons).

Sibir has a nuclear-turbo-electric powertrain. The onboard nuclear power plant consists of two 175 MWt RITM-200 pressurized water reactors fueled by up to 20% enriched Uranium-235 and two 36 MWe turbogenerators. The propulsion system follows the classic polar icebreaker pattern with three 6.2-metre (20 ft) four-bladed propellers driven by 20-megawatt (27,000 hp) electric motors. With a total propulsion power of 60 megawatts (80,000 hp), Sibir is designed to be capable of breaking 2.8 metres (9 ft) thick level ice at a continuous speed of 1.5–2 knots (2.8–3.7 km/h; 1.7–2.3 mph) at full power when operating in deep water at design draught.
