= Arktika (2016 icebreaker) =

Russian nuclear-powered icebreaker

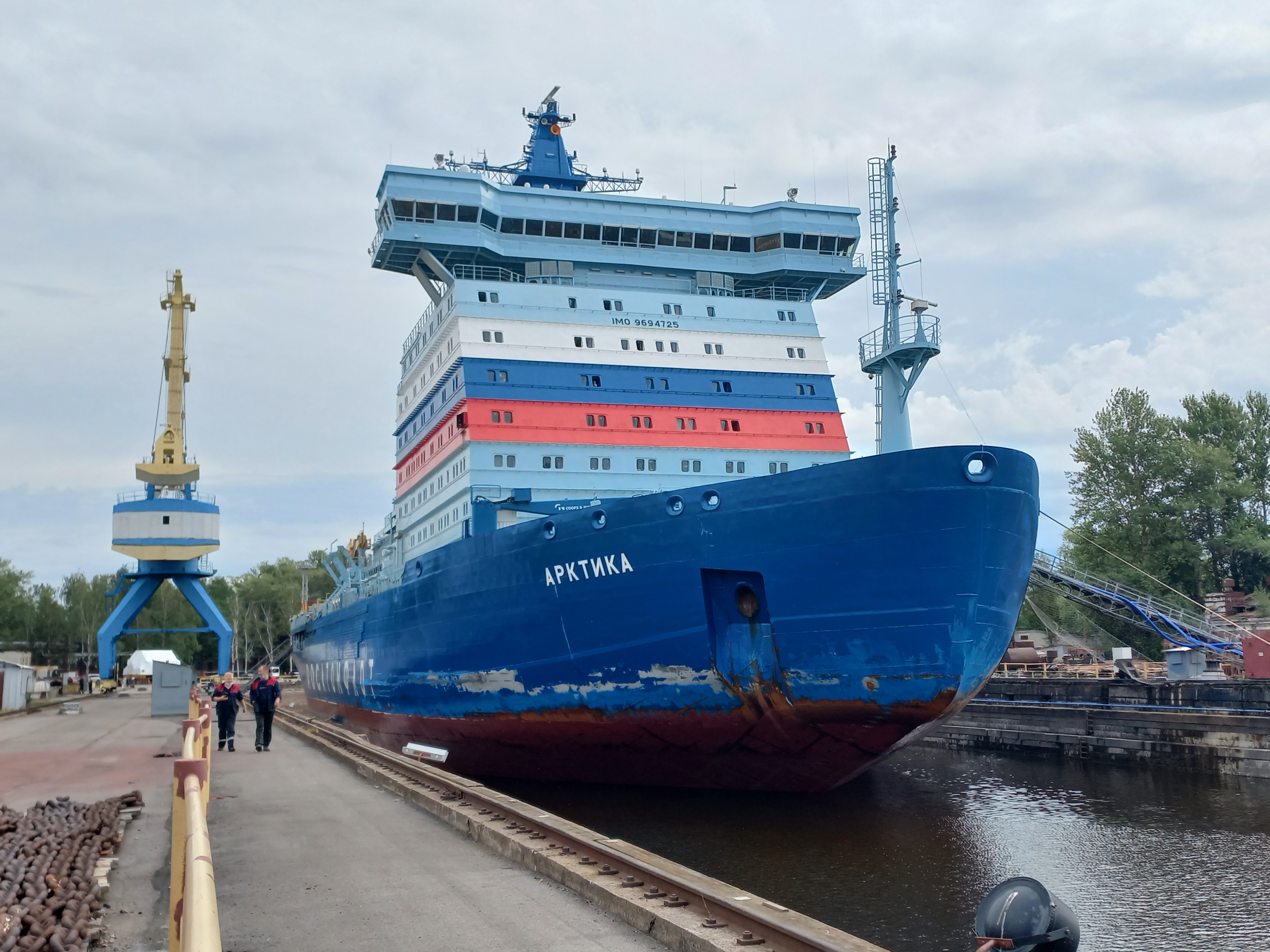
- Arktika in a dry dock in Kronstadt on 11 August 2021 following failure of one of the icebreaker's propulsion motors

History

Russia
- Name: Arktika (Арктика)
- Namesake: Russian for the Arctic
- Operator: FSUE Atomflot
- Port of registry: Murmansk, Russia
- Ordered: 3 August 2012
- Builder: Baltic Shipyard, Saint Petersburg
- Cost: RUB 36.959 billion
- Yard number: 05706
- Laid down: 5 November 2013
- Launched: 16 June 2016
- Sponsored by: Valentina Matviyenko
- Completed: December 2017 (contract date); 21 October 2020 (commissioning ceremony)
- In service: November 2020–
- Identification: IMO number: 9694725; MMSI number: 273210920; Call sign: UCZC
- Status: In service

General characteristics
- Class & type: Project 22220 icebreaker
- Tonnage: 28,494 GT; 8,548 NT; 7,146 DWT
- Displacement: 33,327 t (32,801 long tons)
- Length: 173.3 m (569 ft)
- Beam: 34 m (112 ft)
- Height: 51.25 m (168 ft)
- Draft: 10.5 m (34 ft) (dwl); 9.00 m (30 ft) (minimum; achievable); 8.65 m (28 ft) (minimum; official); 8.50 m (28 ft) (minimum; design)
- Depth: 15.2 m (50 ft)
- Ice class: RMRS Icebreaker9
- Installed power: Two RITM-200 nuclear reactors (2 × 175 MWt); Two turbogenerators (2 × 36 MWe)
- Propulsion: Nuclear-turbo-electric; Three shafts (3 × 20 MW)
- Speed: 22 knots (41 km/h; 25 mph); 1.5–2 knots (2.8–3.7 km/h; 1.7–2.3 mph) in 2.8 m (9 ft) ice
- Endurance: 7 years (reactor fuel); 6 months (provisions)
- Crew: 75
- Aviation facilities: Helideck and hangar

Arktika (Russian: Арктика, romanized: Arctic, IPA: [ˈarktʲɪkə]) is a Russian nuclear-powered icebreaker built by Baltic Shipyard in Saint Petersburg. It is the lead ship of Project 22220 icebreakers and superseded the preceding class of nuclear-powered icebreakers as the largest and most powerful icebreaker ever constructed.

== Development and construction ==
=== Background ===
In the late 1980s, the Russian research institutes and design bureaus developed a successor for the 1970s Arktika-class nuclear-powered icebreakers as part of a wider icebreaker fleet renewal program initiated shortly after the dissolution of the Soviet Union. The new 60-megawatt icebreaker, referred to using a type size series designation LK-60Ya, (Note: The type size series designation "LK-60Ya" (Russian: ЛК-60Я) comes from the Russian language word for "icebreaker" (Russian: ледокол, romanized: ledokol), propulsion power (60 megawatts), and the first letter of the Russian word for "nuclear" (Russian: ядерное, romanized: yadernoye).) would feature a so-called dual-draft functionality which would allow the vessel to operate in shallow coastal areas after de-ballasting. Although the preliminary designs had been developed almost two decades earlier, the LK-60Ya design was finalized in 2009 as Project 22220 by Central Design Bureau "Iceberg" and the construction of the first vessel was awarded to Saint Petersburg-based Baltic Shipyard in August 2012. Three additional contracts in May 2014, August 2019 and February 2023 have increased the number of Project 22220 icebreakers under construction or on order to seven.

=== Construction ===
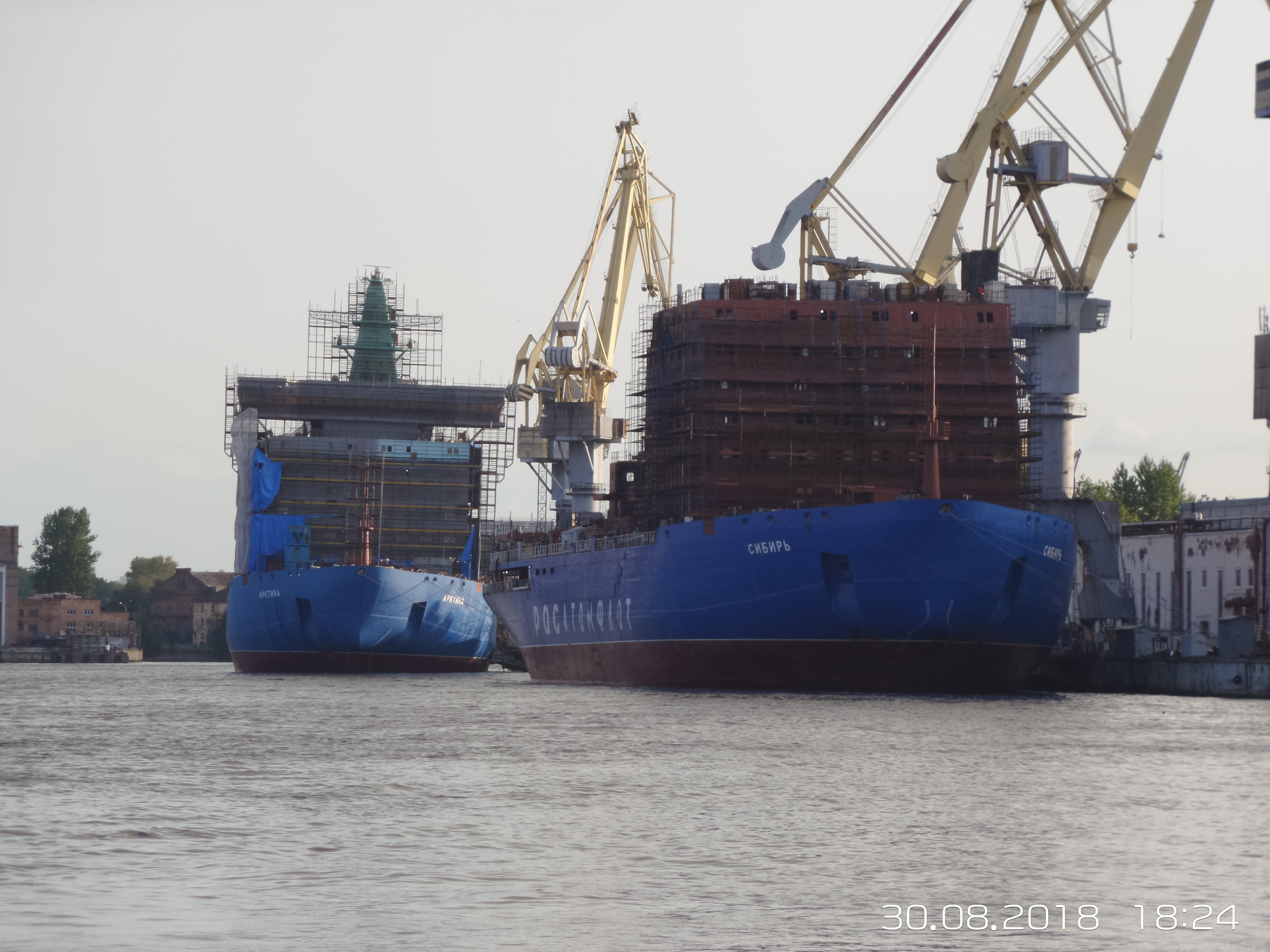
Arktika (left) and Sibir under construction at Baltic Shipyard in August 2018.

==== Shipbuilding contract and start of construction ====
The construction of the first Project 22220 icebreaker was awarded to Baltic Shipyard, the sole bidder in the public tender, on 3 August 2012 with a contract value of 36.959 billion rubles (about US$1.16 billion).

The steel-cutting ceremony, which marked the beginning of construction, was held on 1 November 2012 and the keel was laid on the slipway on 5 November 2013. By August 2015, 70% of the hull assembly including the icebreaking bow had been completed, and the construction was proceeding according to the original schedule according to which the vessel would be delivered by December 2017. The launching ceremony, initially scheduled for May 2016, was held on 16 June 2016. The new icebreaker was named Arktika, Russian for the Arctic, after her predecessor.

While the hull of the icebreaker was still being assembled on the slipway, the shipyard began the construction of the 2,400-tonne (2,400-long-ton) superstructure that would be installed after launching. Similarly, the 180-tonne (180-long-ton) RITM-200 nuclear reactors were installed after launching: the first one on 2 September 2016 and the second one on 21 September.

==== Construction delayed by the Russo-Ukrainian war ====
By early 2017, it was revealed that the construction of the lead ship of Project 22220 icebreakers had fallen behind schedule and Baltic Shipyard was forced to apply for a one-year contract extension from the Russian Government. The reason for the delay was largely related to the Russo-Ukrainian war. The ship's two main turbogenerators, initially ordered from the Ukrainian state-owned company Turboatom, had to be sourced domestically from Kirov-Energomash due to the deteriorated Russia–Ukraine relations. Similarly, the supplier of the integrated electric propulsion system was changed from the GE Power Conversion, a subsidiary of General Electric, to TSNII SET, a subsidiary of Krylov State Research Center.

On 12 July 2017, President Vladimir Putin ordered the United Shipbuilding Corporation to postpone the delivery of the new icebreaker to 2019. Further delays in the manufacturing and testing of the steam turbines later pushed this deadline to May 2020.

==== Builder's trials ====
The quayside trials, which included testing of the ship's systems while connected to shore power, began in May 2018. One year later, Arktika's reactors received their first batch of nuclear fuel and in October 2019 the ship's nuclear power plant was brought to the minimum level of controlled reaction. In Russia, the latter event was referred to as "physical launching" of the reactors.

Arktika began the first stage of sea trials in Gulf of Finland under diesel power on 12 December 2019. During the two-day trials, the vessel achieved a speed of 6 knots (11 km/h; 6.9 mph) using the ship's auxiliary diesel power plant.

The next trials, during which the vessel would sail for the first time on nuclear power, were originally scheduled for March–April 2020 but were later postponed to mid-June. The three-week trials finally commenced on 23 June when Arktika was towed out to the Gulf of Finland by four tugboats and concluded on 13 July.

The final sea trials began in late August and were concluded on 16 September 2020, after which Arktika returned to Saint Petersburg to prepare the vessel for its maiden voyage to Murmansk.

On 22 September 2020, Arktika departed Saint Petersburg for Murmansk. During the two-week voyage, the icebreaker would also head to the polar ice pack beyond Franz Josef Land to adjust the ship's electric propulsion system in ice-covered waters. Arktika reached the geographic North Pole on 3 October and, after the 1.1 to 1.2 metres (3.6 to 3.9 ft) thick ice turned out not to be enough to test the capabilities of the new nuclear-powered icebreaker, arrived in its home port on 12 October.

While the signing of the final acceptance certificate for the nuclear-powered icebreaker was initially scheduled for 5 November 2020 according to a draft resolution of the Russian government, it was signed at the official flag-raising ceremony held onboard Arktika in Murmansk on 21 October 2020.

==== Propulsion motor failure and other issues ====
In February 2020, it was reported that the propulsion motor on the starboard shaft had failed during the quayside trials due to a short circuit and, if the 300-ton motor needs to be replaced, this may have an impact on the delivery date of the icebreaker. In March 2020, it was further reported that Arktika may be accepted to trial service with reduced propulsion power of 40 to 50 megawatts while a replacement motor is being manufactured. According to Central Design Bureau "Iceberg", this would reduce the vessel's maximum icebreaking capability by about 20 centimetres (8 in). In late June, the United Shipbuilding Corporation confirmed that the vessel would be accepted for trial service in the Arctic in September or October with a limited propulsion power of 50 megawatts while the replacement of the faulty propulsion motor was scheduled for August–November 2021. The work, which requires cutting the icebreaker's hull to access and replace the failed components, would be carried out at Kronstadt Marine Plant. Arktika returned to Saint Petersburg in summer 2021 and entered a graving dock in Kronstadt in mid-August. The faulty electric motor was replaced in September 2021 and the icebreaker went on post-repair trials in the Gulf of Finland in late November alongside its sister ship, Sibir, that was on builder's pre-delivery trials. With full propulsion power restored, Arktika departed Saint Petersburg in the beginning of December and headed for icebreaking duty in the Arctic.

Russian icebreaker expert, Professor L. G. Tsoy, has publicly voiced concerns about the Arktika's excessive lightship weight which has led to the minimum operating draught in fresh water reportedly increasing from the planned 8.7 metres (29 ft) to 9.3 metres (31 ft). This would not allow the icebreaker to operate efficiently in shallow ice-covered river estuaries such as the Gulf of Ob. He has also voiced concerns about the icebreaking capability. While analysis of the results obtained from full-scale trials with Arktika and Sibir in June 2023 indicated that the Project 22220 nuclear-powered icebreakers would fulfill their contractual performance requirements and "have proven their outstanding ice performance parameters", Tsoy noted that the tests were carried out in late spring with deteriorated ice conditions, the icebreakers' propulsion systems could not work at their maximum rated power, and the performance in astern direction was inadequate.

In June–August 2020, Rosatomflot filed three lawsuits against Baltic Shipyard in the Moscow Arbitration Court, claiming almost 1 billion rubles of compensation for undisclosed reasons.

== Career ==
Initially, Rosatom stated that one of the first missions of the newly commissioned nuclear-powered icebreaker would be to take 25 Russian teenagers between 12 and 16 years old, finalists of the "Arctic Olympiad", to the North Pole in October 2020. However, Arktika remained at Atomflot's base in Murmansk until mid-November following the official flag-raising ceremony. The vessel departed on its first working voyage on the Northern Sea Route on 14 November but briefly returned to Murmansk for minor technical adjustments. The first escort operation was carried out on 24 November. After the initial deployment, the icebreaker was expected to return to Murmansk to stock up provisions in mid-December and then head back to the Northern Sea Route. However, due to technical issues Arktika remained in Atomflot's base until late February 2021.

On 1 January 2022, the ship arrived in Pevek with two cargo vessels, but one vessel of the convoy had been left on the route until the Arktika could go back for her.

== Design ==
Arktika is 173.3 metres (569 ft) long overall and has a maximum beam of 34 metres (112 ft). Designed to operate efficiently both in shallow Arctic river estuaries as well as along the Northern Sea Route, the draught of the vessel can be varied between about 9 and 10.5 metres (30 and 34 ft) by taking in and discharging ballast water, with displacement up to 33,327 tonnes (32,801 long tons).

Arktika has a nuclear-turbo-electric powertrain. The onboard nuclear power plant consists of two 175 MWt RITM-200 pressurized water reactors fueled by up to 20% enriched Uranium-235 and two 36 MWe turbogenerators. The propulsion system follows the classic polar icebreaker pattern with three 6.2-metre (20 ft) four-bladed propellers driven by 20-megawatt (27,000 hp) electric motors. With a total propulsion power of 60 megawatts (80,000 hp), Arktika is designed to be capable of breaking 2.8 metres (9 ft) thick level ice at a continuous speed of 1.5–2 knots (2.8–3.7 km/h; 1.7–2.3 mph) at full power when operating in deep water at design draught.
