= Project 22220 icebreaker =

Series of Russian nuclear-powered icebreakers under construction

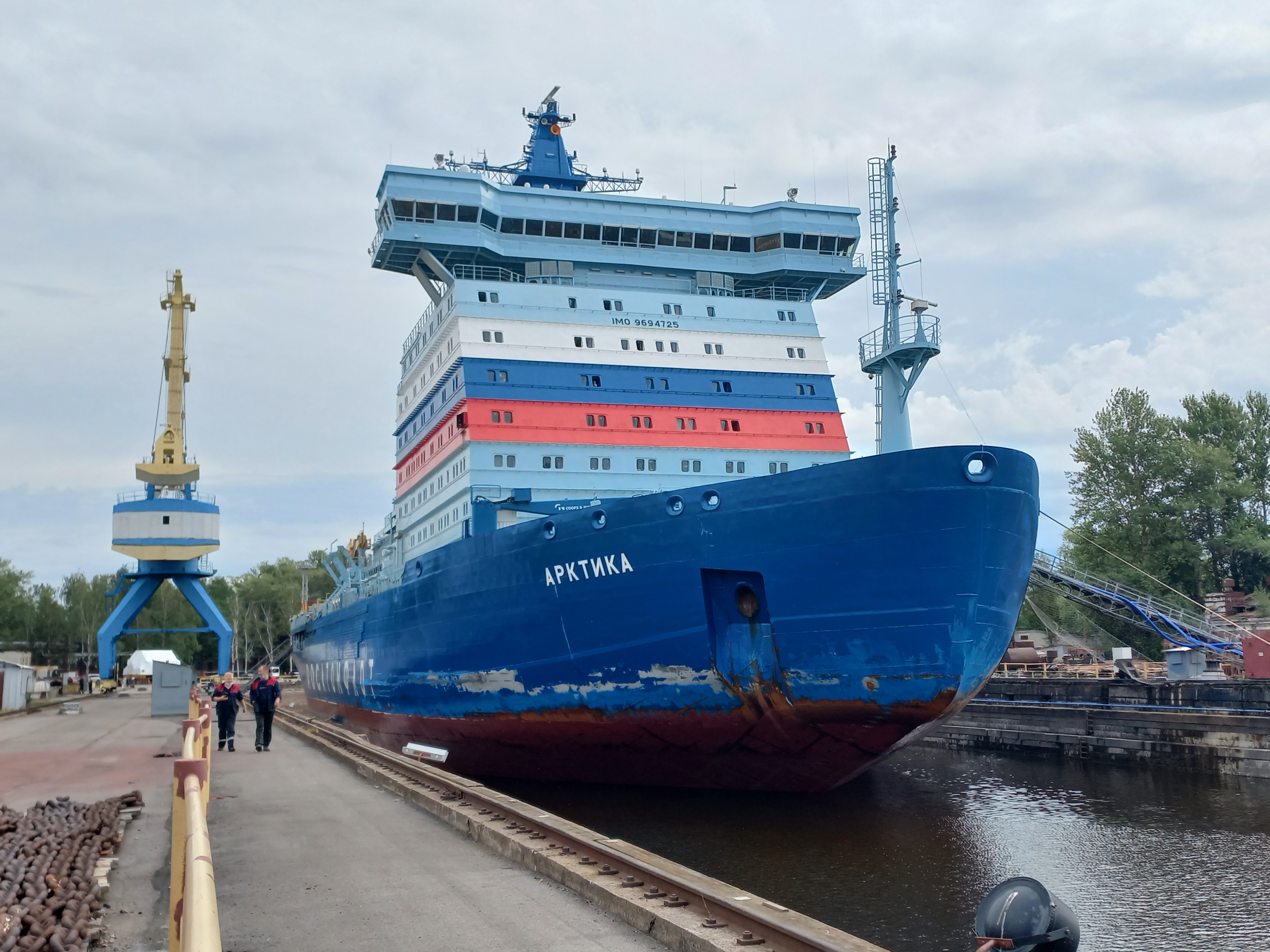
- Arktika in a dry dock in Kronstadt, 2021

Class overview
- Builders: Baltic Shipyard
- Operators: FSUE Atomflot
- Preceded by: Arktika class; Taymyr class
- Succeeded by: Project 10510
- Built: 2013–present
- In service: 2020–present
- Planned: 7
- Building: 3
- Active: 4

General characteristics
- Type: Icebreaker
- Displacement: 32,747–33,327 t (32,230–32,801 long tons) (dwl); 25,540 t (25,140 long tons) (minimum)
- Length: 173.3 m (569 ft) (overall); 160.0 m (525 ft) (dwl)
- Beam: 34 m (112 ft) (maximum); 33 m (108 ft) (dwl)
- Height: 51.25 m (168 ft)
- Draft: 10.5 m (34 ft) (dwl); 9.00 m (30 ft) (minimum; achievable); 8.65 m (28 ft) (minimum; official); 8.50 m (28 ft) (minimum; design)
- Depth: 15.2 m (50 ft)
- Ice class: RMRS Icebreaker9
- Installed power: Two RITM-200 nuclear reactors (2 × 175 MWt); Two turbogenerators (2 × 36 MWe)
- Propulsion: Nuclear-turbo-electric; Three shafts (3 × 20 MW)
- Speed: 22 knots (41 km/h; 25 mph); 1.5–2 knots (2.8–3.7 km/h; 1.7–2.3 mph) in 2.8 m (9 ft) ice
- Endurance: 7 years (reactor fuel); 6 months (provisions)
- Crew: 75
- Aviation facilities: Helideck and hangar

Project 22220, also known through the Russian type size series designation LK-60Ya, (Note: The type size series designation "LK-60Ya" (Russian: ЛК-60Я) comes from the Russian language word for "icebreaker" (Russian: ледокол, romanized: ledokol), propulsion power (60 megawatts), and the first letter of the Russian word for "nuclear" (Russian: ядерное, romanized: yadernoye).) is a series of Russian nuclear-powered icebreakers. The lead ship of the class, Arktika, was delivered in 2020 and surpassed the preceding Soviet-built series of nuclear-powered icebreakers as the largest and most powerful icebreaker in the world.

As of November 2025, four Project 22220 icebreakers (Arktika, Sibir, Ural and Yakutiya) are in service, the fifth (Chukotka) has been launched, and the sixth (Leningrad) and seventh (Stalingrad) have been laid down at Baltic Shipyard in Saint Petersburg.

== Development ==
=== LK-60Ya ===
After the Second World War, the Soviet Union launched an ambitious marine transportation development program with the intention of turning the ice-covered Northern Sea Route into a navigable shipping route which could be then used to extract natural resources from the Arctic. This included replacing the obsolete steam-powered icebreakers with more powerful diesel-electric vessels and culminated with the construction of the first nuclear-powered icebreaker in the late 1950s. The second phase, which began in the early 1970s and continued until the dissolution of the Soviet Union, further expanded the Soviet icebreaker fleet with additional nuclear- and diesel-powered icebreakers that enabled uninterrupted year-round operation in the western part of the Northern Sea Route as well as extended the navigating season in the eastern sector.

In the 1980s, studies by the Central Marine Research and Design Institute (CNIIMF) and the Central Design Bureau "Iceberg" resulted in "icebreaker type size series" ranging from 7-megawatt auxiliary icebreakers (LK-7) to a 110-megawatt nuclear-powered "icebreaker-leaders" (LK-110Ya). One of the proposed new icebreaker classes, LK-60Ya, was developed as a direct replacement for the previous-generation Arktika-class nuclear-powered icebreakers which had entered service in the late 1970s and seen widespread use in the Russian Arctic. In addition to operating as heavy line icebreakers along the full length of the Northern Sea Route from Murmansk all the way to the Bering Strait, the new 60-megawatt icebreakers would also replace the shallow-draft nuclear-powered icebreakers Taymyr and Vaygach on the Dudinka-Murmansk route which included icebreaking operations in the Yenisey river estuary. The latter operation was made possible by the novel dual-draft functionality, ability to de-ballast the vessel when approaching shallow coastal areas. Other technical characteristics of the next-generation nuclear-powered icebreakers were drawn from the Russians' extensive operational experience from Arctic shipping. For example, it was determined that in order to ensure reliable year-round navigation in the western part of the Northern Sea Route, LK-60Ya would have to be capable of breaking at least 2.8-metre (9 ft) ice, an improvement over the old Arktika's 2.3-metre (8 ft) icebreaking capability. In addition, escorting Russian Arctic cargo ships such as the then-common SA-15 type safely and efficiently in heavy ice conditions would require an icebreaker with a beam of 32 to 33 metres (105 to 108 ft) and a displacement of 34,000 to 36,000 tonnes (33,000 to 35,000 long tons).

While traffic volumes along the Northern Sea Route declined drastically in the early 1990s due to the slowdown of the Russian economy, an ambitious fleet renewal program was nonetheless launched under the presidential program Revival of the Merchant Fleet of Russia (1993–2000). In the end, none of the planned icebreakers were built and the follow-up federal program Modernization of the transport system of Russia (2002–2010) included funding for the construction of only two new diesel-electric icebreakers in addition to completing the unfinished Arktika-class icebreaker 50 Let Pobedy and starting the preliminary design development of the next generation nuclear-powered icebreakers.

=== Project 22220 ===
Although the preliminary design had been developed already in the late 1980s, the final technical design of LK-60Ya was completed in 2009 by Central Design Bureau "Iceberg" as Project 22220.

The construction of the lead ship was awarded to Saint Petersburg-based Baltic Shipyard, part of the state-owned United Shipbuilding Corporation, in August 2012 with a contract price of 36.959 billion rubles (about US$1.16 billion). A 84.4 billion ruble (about US$2.4 billion) follow-up contract for two additional vessels was signed in May 2014 and a second contract, worth over 100 billion rubles (about US$1.5 billion), for two more in August 2019. In January 2023, the Russian government allocated 58.9 billion rubles (about US$820 million) for financing 50% of the construction of two additional Project 22220 icebreakers and the shipbuilding contract was signed on 2 February.

With the Project 22220 icebreakers under construction, focus moved to the development of even larger and more powerful nuclear-powered icebreakers known as Project 10510 "Leader" (Russian: Лидер, romanized: Lider), with the first ship expected to be commissioned by the Zvezda Shipbuilding Complex in 2027. However, the construction of the nuclear-powered icebreakers in Russia have been affected by the international sanctions during the Russo-Ukrainian War since 2022. The first Project 10510 icebreaker, Rossiya, has been delayed until 2030 and the second and third hulls were cancelled in early 2023 in favour of two additional Project 22220 icebreakers.

== Construction ==
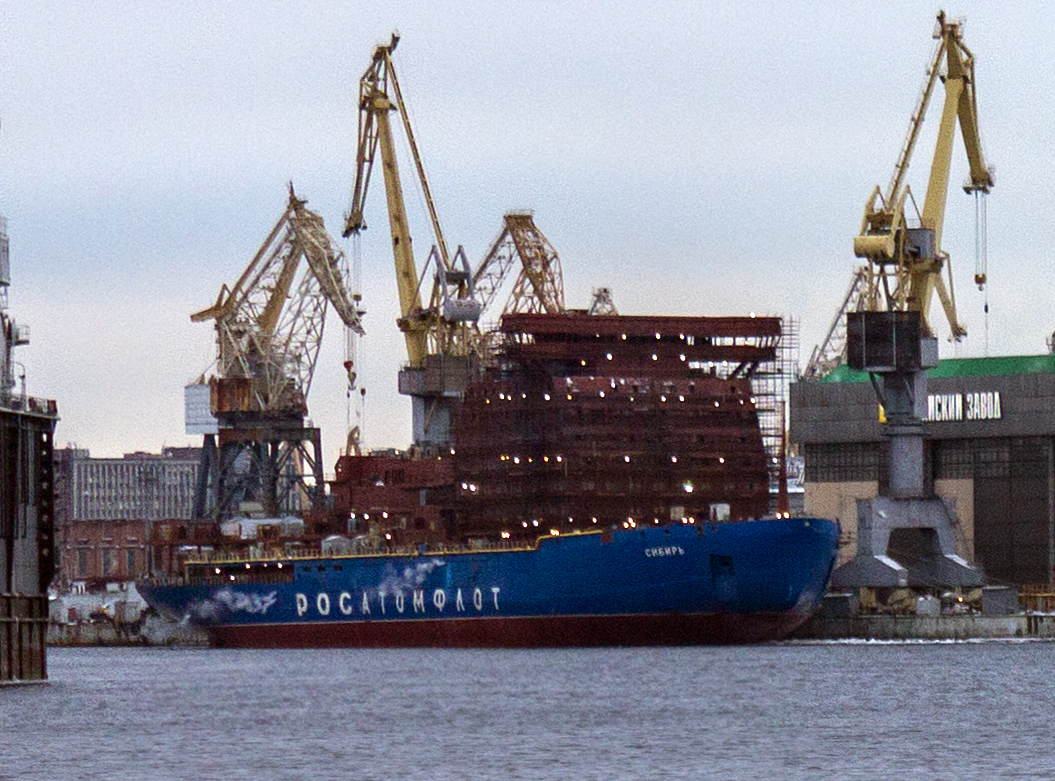
Sibir under construction at Baltic Shipyard, December 2018

The construction of the first Project 22220 icebreaker began with a steel cutting ceremony on 1 November 2012 and the keel of the lead ship of the class was laid on the slipway on 5 November 2013. In a launching ceremony on 16 June 2016, the icebreaker was named Arktika (Russian: Арктика, lit. 'Arctic') after the first surface ship to reach the North Pole that was in service in 1975–2008. While initially scheduled for delivery by December 2017, the construction of the lead Project 22220 icebreaker fell behind schedule due to problems related to the delivery of domestically-sourced components. Arktika began the first stage of sea trials in Gulf of Finland under diesel power on 12 December 2019 and returned to Saint Petersburg two days later. The next sea trials, during which the vessel would be tested under nuclear power for the first time, commenced on 23 June and concluded on 13 July. Shortly after completing the final sea trials by mid-September, Arktika sailed from Saint Petersburg to Murmansk via the North Pole where the icebreaker arrived on 3 October. The flag-raising ceremony marking the vessel's entry to service was held in Murmansk on 21 October 2020.

The keel of the second Project 22220 icebreaker (referred to as the "first serial ship" of the class in Russia) was laid on 26 May 2015. The icebreaker was launched as Sibir (Russian: Сибирь, lit. 'Siberia') on 22 September 2017. Previously, the name had been used on the second Arktika-class icebreaker that was in service in 1977–1992. As with the lead ship, the problems with equipment delivery have postponed the delivery of the vessel from 2018 to late 2021. Sibir left for first sea trials on 16 November 2021 and returned to Saint Petersburg at the end of the month. After second sea trials, Sibir was delivered to Atomflot on 24 December 2021. The vessel began icebreaking operations in the Kara Sea in January 2022.

The keel-laying ceremony of the third ("second serial") Project 22220 icebreaker was held on 25 July 2016 shortly after the partially-assembled hull of Sibir had been moved down the slipway for final hull assembly. The vessel was launched on 27 May 2019 as Ural (Russian: Урал; after the Ural Mountains). The name had previously been selected for the final Arktika-class icebreaker when it was laid down in 1989, but during the construction the vessel was renamed 50 Let Pobedy (Russian: 50 лет Победы, lit. '50 Years of Victory'). The delivery of the vessel, initially scheduled for 2020, was postponed first to 2021 and then to late 2022. After completing sea trials between 14 and 31 October 2022, the flag-raising ceremony was held on Ural on 22 November 2022. The icebreaker left for its homeport, Murmansk, on the following day.

Keel of the fourth ("third serial") Project 22220 icebreaker was laid down on 26 May 2020 and the vessel was launched on 22 November 2022. The vessel, delivered on 6 March 2025, is named Yakutiya (Russian: Якутия; after the Republic of Sakha (Yakutia)).

The keel-laying ceremony of the fifth ("fourth serial") Project 22220 icebreaker, Chukotka (Russian: Чукотка; after Chukotka Autonomous Okrug), was held on 16 December 2020 and the vessel was launched on 6 November 2024.

The sixth ("fifth serial") Project 22220 icebreaker was initially to be named Kamchatka (Russian: Камчатка; after the Kamchatka Peninsula), but in November 2023 it was announced that they would be instead named Leningrad (Russian: Ленинград) to commemorate the Siege of Leningrad. The keel-laying ceremony of the vessel was held on 26 January 2024.

The construction of the seventh ("sixth serial") Project 22220 icebreaker began with a steel cutting ceremony on 7 May 2025 and the keel was laid on 18 November 2025. The vessel was initially to be named Sakhalin (Russian: Сахалин; after the Sakhalin island), but as with the preceding vessel, the name was changed to Stalingrad (Russian: Сталинград) to commemorate the Battle of Stalingrad.

== Design ==
=== General characteristics ===
Project 22220 icebreakers are between 172.7 and 173.3 metres (567 and 569 ft) long overall and about 160.0 metres (525 ft) at design waterline. While the maximum beam is 34 metres (112 ft), at design waterline the width of the hull reduces to 33 metres (108 ft) due to inclined sides. In order to be able to operate efficiently both in shallow Arctic river estuaries as well as along the Northern Sea Route, the draught of the Project 22220 icebreakers can be varied by taking in and discharging ballast water. Originally designed with an operational draught range of 8.5 to 10.5 metres (27 ft 11 in to 34 ft 5 in), the official minimum operational draught has since increased first to 8.55 metres (28 ft 1 in) and later to 8.65 metres (28 ft 5 in). However, due to excess weight, the minimum achievable draught is actually about 9 metres (29 ft 6 in). At the original minimum draught of 8.5 metres (28 ft), the icebreakers have a displacement of about 25,540 tonnes (25,140 long tons) while the full load displacement at design draught is between 32,747 and 33,327 tonnes (32,230 and 32,801 long tons). In terms of size, Project 22220 icebreakers are 13.7 metres (45 ft) longer and 4 metres (13 ft) wider than 50 Let Pobedy, previously the world's largest icebreaker, and at full load have about one third greater displacement.

The ice class of Project 22220 icebreakers, Icebreaker9, is the highest assigned by the Russian Maritime Register of Shipping (RMRS) and allows operation in up to 4 metres (13 ft) thick ice during the winter and spring navigating period.

=== Power, propulsion and performance ===
Like the preceding Russian nuclear-powered icebreakers since the 1959-built Lenin, Project 22220 icebreakers feature a nuclear-turbo-electric powertrain in which nuclear reactors produce steam for turbogenerators which, in turn, generate electrical power for propulsion motors driving the ship's propellers.

The onboard nuclear power plant consists of two RITM-200 pressurized water reactors with a thermal output of 175 MWt each. The reactors, developed by OKBM Afrikantov, use up to 20% enriched Uranium-235 and, when operating with a capacity factor of 0.65, require refueling every seven years over a 40-year planned service life. The external dimensions of the two-reactor plant located amidships are 6 by 13.2 by 15.5 metres (20 by 43 by 51 ft) and it weighs 1,100 tonnes (1,100 long tons; 1,200 short tons). Two main turbogenerators produced by Kirov-Energomash each generate 36 megawatts of electrical power at 3,000 rpm.

The propulsion system of Project 22220 icebreakers follows the classic polar icebreaker pattern with three shaft lines and a single rudder. The 6.2-metre (20 ft) four-bladed fixed pitch propellers, each driven by a 20-megawatt (27,000 hp) electric motor, are made of stainless steel and weigh about 60 tonnes (59 long tons; 66 short tons) apiece. With a total propulsion power of 60 megawatts (80,000 hp), Project 22220 icebreakers supersede the 56-megawatt (75,000 hp) Yamal and 50 Let Pobedy — the two remaining Arktika-class icebreakers in service — as the world's most powerful icebreakers.

Project 22220 icebreakers are designed to be capable of breaking 2.8 metres (9 ft) thick level ice at a continuous speed of 1.5–2 knots (2.8–3.7 km/h; 1.7–2.3 mph) at full power when operating in deep water at design draught. In open water, the icebreakers can achieve a speed of 22 knots (41 km/h; 25 mph).

== Ships in class ==
Name	IMO number	Laid down	Launched	Commissioned	Status
Arktika	9694725	5 November 2013	16 June 2016	21 October 2020	In service
Sibir	9774422	26 May 2015	22 September 2017	24 December 2021	In service
Ural	9658642	25 July 2016	25 May 2019	22 November 2022	In service
Yakutiya	9911202	26 May 2020	22 November 2022	6 March 2025	In service
Chukotka	9924106	16 December 2020	6 November 2024	December 2026 (original plan); 2027 (current estimate)	Under construction
Leningrad	1022952	26 January 2024	November 2026 (planned)	December 2028 (planned)	Under construction
Stalingrad	1022964	18 November 2025	2028 (planned)	December 2030 (planned)	Under construction

== See also ==
- Shipbuilding in Russia
