= RITM-200 =

Nuclear reactor

- Generation: Generation III+ reactor
- Reactor concept: Pressurized water reactor
- Reactor types: RITM-200 RITM-200S; RITM-200N; RITM-200M; RITM-400 RITM-400M
- Status: operational

Main parameters of the reactor core
- Fuel (fissile material): ^{235}U (LEU)
- Fuel state: Solid
- Neutron energy spectrum: Thermal
- Primary control method: Control rods
- Primary moderator: Water
- Primary coolant: Liquid (light water)

Reactor usage
- Primary use: Generation of electricity and propulsion
- Power (thermal): RITM-200: 175 MW_{th} RITM-200S: 198 MW_{th} RITM-200N: 190 MW_{th} RITM-200M: 198 MW_{th} RITM-400: 315 MW_{th} RITM-400M: 340 MW_{th}
- Power (electric): RITM-200: 55 MW_{e} RITM‑200S: 58 MW_{e} RITM-400: 80 MW_{e}

The RITM-200 is an integrated Generation III+ pressurized water reactor developed by OKBM Afrikantov and designed to produce 55 MWe. The design is an improvement of KLT-40S reactor. It uses up to 20% enriched uranium-235 and can be refueled every 10 years for a 60 year planned lifespan in floating power plant installation. If installed in a stationary power plant, the fuel cycle is 6 years.

== Design ==
The RITM-200 has a compact integrated layout placing equipment within the steam generator casing, halving system weight compared to earlier designs and improving ability to operate in rolling and pitching seas.

== Usage ==
As of March 2025, there are 8 RITM type reactors under construction at different stages (for floating power units and icebreakers). Project 22220 icebreakers each use 2 RITM-200 reactors.

=== Icebreakers ===
It powers the Project 22220 icebreakers, the first of which went critical in October 2019. Since 2012, ten RITM‑200 reactors have been manufactured for five Russian Project 22220 multi-purpose nuclear icebreakers. Eight reactors are installed on the Arktika, Sibir, Ural and Yakutia icebreakers, which are already in operation. Construction of Chukotka is nearing completion.

In May 2026 the first RITM-200 reactor was produced for the Leningrad (2028 icebreaker). The expected service life of the reactor is 40 years.

=== Floating power plants ===
The RITM‑200C reactor version, with generation capacity of 58 MWe, will be installed on the floating power units to supply power to the Baimsky GOK mining site in Chukotka. They are planned to be put in operation in 2029.

The volume of investments in the project was estimated at RUB900bn ($10bn). However, Georgy Fotin, Director General of Baimskaya Management Company, said in April, that the assessment had been revised upwards and some RUB170bn had already been invested.

The Baim project will be supplied with electricity using the new FNPPs of the PEB-106 project, designed for operation in the Far North and Far East. They will use the new RITM-200S reactors, which will supply 106 MWe to consumers. Their service life is 40 years and the interval between refuelling is five years. The units will be held in place by rigid mooring devices, which make it possible to compensate for the movement of the power units from the ebb and flow. The power generated by the power unit is transmitted to the shore using 50 high-voltage cables. Three main floating power units and one reserve unit will be installed, which will be used during the repair of the main units.

In May 2026 RITM-200C was produced for the future floating nuclear plant. The RITM-200C is a modified RITM-200 reactor. The FPU-106 (floating power unit) units will provide 106 MWe, re-fuelling will happen every 5-7 years with the service life of 40 years. A version of a floating power unit for international markets will be 100 MWe with a re-fuelling every 10 years and the service life of 60 years.

=== Stationary power plants ===
In November 2020, Rosatom announced plans to place a land-based RITM-200N SMR in isolated Ust-Kuyga town in Yakutia. The reactor will replace current coal and oil based electricity and heat generation at half the price. In April 2023, a license was given for a pilot RITM-200N plant to be built near the village of Ust-Kuyga, with commissioning planned for 2028.

== Export ==
=== Uzbekistan ===
On 27 May 2024, Rosatom signed a contract to construct a 330 MW nuclear power plant in Uzbekistan's Jizzakh Region, featuring six 55 MWe RITM-200N small modular reactors.

This plan was later changed on 24 March 2026 to have two 1 GW VVER-1000 units and two 55MWe RITM-200N small modular reactors instead of the six 55MWe RITM-200N, increasing the total capacity to over 2100MWe.

In June 2026 construction of the first RITM-200N in Uzbekistan has started, 2029 is expected year when it goes critical.

== RITM-400 ==
RITM-400 is a pressurised water reactor with a planned capacity of 80 MWe.

According to Nuclear Energy International, Nornickel and Rosatom are considering the possibility of setting up a SMR plant with a capacity of 320 MWe with four RITM-400 reactors.

In May 2025, the first RITM-400 was manufactured for a Project 10510 icebreaker.

== Technical specifications ==
Specification	RITM-200	RITM-400	RITM-200S	RITM-200M	RITM-400M	RITM-200N
Objective	Project 22220	Project 10510	PEB-106	PEB-100	Project 20873	SMR
Number of reactors	2	2	2	2	2	1
Thermal output, MW	2*175	2*315	2*198	2*198	2*340	190
Capacity net, MW			2*53	2*50	2*87,5	50
Capacity gross, MW			2*58	2*55		55
Efficiency, net %						
Pressure in the turbine inlet						
Pressure in the primary circuit						
Coolant temperature at core inlet						
Coolant temperature at core outlet						
Number of fuel rods in assembly						
Number of fuel assemblies	199		199	241	313	199
Fuel	^{235}U	^{235}U	^{235}U	^{235}U	^{235}U	^{235}U
Load fuel, tonne						
Average uranium enrichment, %	20	20	20	20	20	20
Average fuel burnup, MW · day / kg						
Refueling interval, year	7	10	5 - 6	6 - 8	5	6
Service life, year	40	40	40	60	60	60
