= List of research stations in the Arctic =

Countries with research stations in the Arctic (blue)

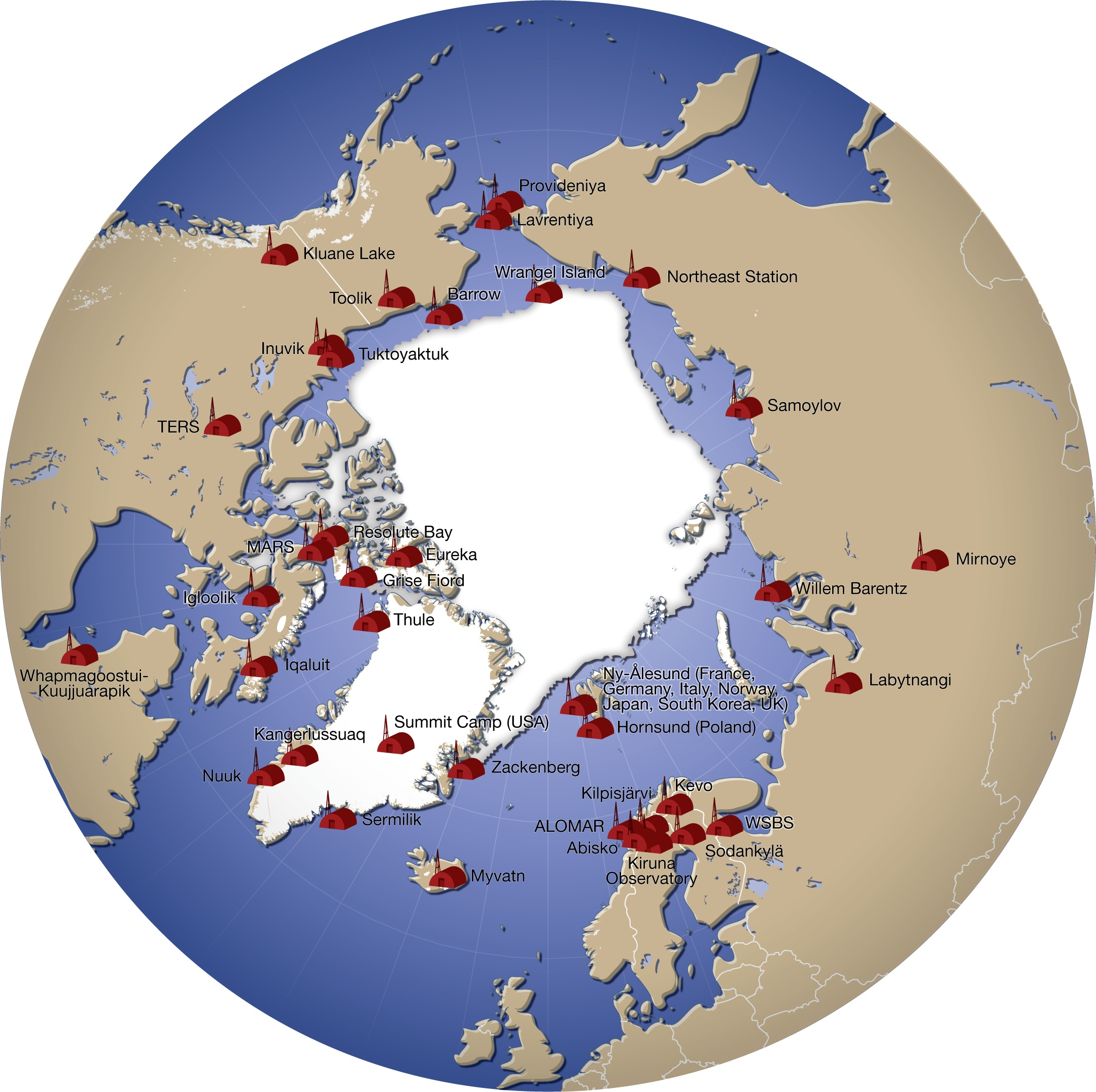
Location of some of the major research stations in the Arctic

A number of governments maintain permanent research stations in the Arctic. Also known as Arctic bases, polar stations or ice stations, these bases are widely distributed across the northern polar region of Earth.

Historically few research stations have been permanent. Most of them were temporary, being abandoned after the completion of the project or owing to lack of funding to continue the research. Some of these were military or listening posts created as a result of the proximity of the United States and Soviet Union to each other's landmass across the polar region.

Ice stations are constructed on land or on ice that rests on land, while others are drifting ice stations built on the sea ice of the high latitudes of the Arctic Ocean.

== Research stations ==
Active research stations
Station name	Location	Operating country	Est.	Population	
				Summer	Winter
Abisko Scientific Research Station	Abisko, Sápmi	Sweden	1903	12	12
Adam Mickiewicz University Polar Station	Petuniabukta, Svalbard, Norway	Poland	2011		
Alomar Observatory	Andøya Space, Andøya, Svalbard	Norway	1994		
Yellow River Station	Ny-Ålesund, Svalbard, Norway	China	2003	25	2
AWIPEV Arctic Research Station (Rabot/Jean Corbel Stations)	Ny-Ålesund, Svalbard, Norway	France; Germany	2003/1963	40/<8	3
Barrow Observatory	Point Barrow, Alaska	United States	1973	2	2
Canadian High Arctic Research Station (CHARS) campus	Cambridge Bay, Nunavut	Canada	2019	26	26
E. K. Fyodorov Hydrometeorological Observatory (ex Chelyuskin Polar Station)	Cape Chelyuskin, Krasnoyarsk Krai	Russia; Soviet Union	1932		
Chetyrokhstolbovoy Polar Station	Medvezhyi Islands, Sakha	Russia; Soviet Union	1933		
China-Iceland Arctic Science Observatory (CIAO)	Kárhóll, Iceland	China; Iceland	2018		
Churchill Northern Studies Centre (CNSC)	Churchill, Manitoba	Canada	1976	88	
Czech Arctic Research Station	Longyearbyen and Petuniabukta, Svalbard, Norway	Czech Republic	2014	4	2
Daneborg	Wollaston Foreland, Greenland	Denmark	1944		12
Danmarkshavn	Dove Bay, Greenland	Denmark	1906		6
Dirigibile Italia Arctic Station	Ny-Ålesund, Svalbard, Norway	Italy	1997	7	
Dr. Neil Trivett Global Atmosphere Watch Observatory	Alert, Nunavut	Canada	1986		
Flashline Mars Arctic Research Station	Devon Island, Nunavut	Canada	2001	9	9
Gurreholm Research Station	Jameson Land, Greenland	Denmark	1937		
Himadri	Ny-Ålesund, Svalbard, Norway	India	2008	8	
Igloolik Research Centre	Igloolik, Nunavut	Canada	1975	22	10
IndARC	Kongsfjorden, Svalbard, Norway	India	2014		
International Biological Station Lena-Nordenskiöld	Tiksi, Sakha	Russia	1995		
Iqaluit Research Centre	Iqaluit, Nunavut	Canada	1978	20	10
Kevo Research Station	Kevo	Finland	1958	12	7
Kilpisjärvi Biological Station	Kilpisjärvi	Finland	1964		
Kiruna Atmospheric and Geophysical Observatory	Kiruna	Sweden	1957		
Kluane Lake Research Station	Kluane Lake, Yukon	Canada	1961	35	
Koldewey Station	Ny-Ålesund, Svalbard, Norway	Germany	1991		
Labytnangi Ecological Research Station	Labytnangi, Yamalo-Nenets	Russia; Soviet Union	1954	25	
McGill Arctic Research Station	Axel Heiberg Island, Nunavut	Canada	1960	12	0
Mestersvig	Scoresby Land, Greenland	Denmark	1956	40	2
Mývatn Research Station	Mývatn	Iceland	1975		
Netherlands Arctic Station, Univ Groningen	Ny-Ålesund, Svalbard, Norway	Netherlands	1995		
Nicolaus Copernicus University Polar Station	Kaffiøyra, Svalbard, Norway	Poland	1975	2	0
Station Nord	Princess Ingeborg Peninsula, Greenland	Denmark	1952	25	5
Northeast Science Station	Chersky, Sakha	Russia; Soviet Union	1977	65	5
Ny-Ålesund	Spitsbergen, Svalbard	Norway	1967	117	35
Polar Environment Atmospheric Research Laboratory (PEARL)	Eureka, Nunavut	Canada	1993		
Polish Polar Station	Hornsund, Svalbard, Norway	Poland	1957		10
Prima Polar Station	Cape Baranov, Bolshevik Island, Severnaya Zemlya	Russia; Soviet Union	1986		
Samoylov Station	Lena Delta Wildlife Reserve, Sakha	Russia	1998	16	8
Sermilik Station	Ammassalik Island, Greenland	Austria; Denmark	1970, 2023	30	6
Sodankylä Arctic Research Centre	Sodankylä	Finland	1949	30	20
Stanisław Baranowski Spitsbergen Polar Station	Werenskioldbreen, Svalbard, Norway	Poland	1971		
Summit Station	Near summit of the Greenland ice sheet, Greenland	United States	1989	50	5
Thule Research Station	Pituffik, Greenland	Denmark	1995	10	
Toolik Field Station	Toolik Lake, Alaska	United States	1975	175	
Troynoy Island Polar Station	Izvestiy TSIK Islands, Krasnoyarsk Krai	Russia; Soviet Union	1953	5	0
Tundra Ecosystem Research Station (TERS)	Daring Lake, Northwest Territories	Canada	1994	30	0
University of Copenhagen Arctic Station	Qeqertarsuaq, Greenland	Denmark	1906	39	
Ward Hunt Island Observatory Research Station	Ward Hunt Island, Nunavut	Canada	1957	9	0
Western Arctic Research Centre	Inuvik, Northwest Territories	Canada	1964	34	
Whapmagoostui-Kuujjuarapik Research Complex	Whapmagoostui, Quebec	Canada	1971	28	
White Sea Biological Station (WSBS MSU)	Chupa, Republic of Karelia	Russia; Soviet Union	1938	180	50
Villum Research Station	Station Nord, North Greenland	Denmark	1990	14	
Vize Island Arctic Research Station	Vize Island, Krasnoyarsk Krai	Russia; Soviet Union	1945		0
Zackenberg Station	Wollaston Foreland, Greenland	Denmark	1997	25	0
Zeppelin	Zeppelinfjellet, Svalbard	Norway	1990		

Inactive research stations
Station name	Location	Operating country	Est.	Closed	Status
Begichev Polar Station	Maly Begichev Island, Krasnoyarsk Krai	Russia; Soviet Union			Abandoned
Bolshoy Lyakhovsky Polar Station	Bolshoy Lyakhovsky Island. Sakha	Russia; Soviet Union			Abandoned
Borg wintering station	Off Borgjøkel, Queen Louise Land, Greenland	Denmark	1912	1913	Abandoned
Eismitte	Greenland ice sheet, Greenland	Germany	1930	1931	Abandoned
Britannia Sø Field Camp	Britannia Lake, Queen Louise Land, Greenland	United Kingdom	1952	1954	Abandoned
Brønlundhus	Peary Land, Greenland	Denmark	1947		Transformed into a museum
Buor-Khaya Polar Station	Buor-Khaya Gulf, Sakha	Russia; Soviet Union			Abandoned
Centrumsø Research Station	Centrum Lake, Greenland	Denmark	1954		Abandoned
Dye 3	Four different locations in southern Greenland	United States	1971	1991	
Ernst Krenkel Observatory	Hayes Island (Heiss Island), Arkhangelsk Oblast	Soviet Union	1956	1980	
Golomyanniy Island Polar Station	Sredniy Island, off Severnaya Zemlya	Russia; Soviet Union	1954		
Heiberg Polar Station	Heiberg Islands, Krasnoyarsk Krai	Russia; Soviet Union	1940	1995	
Isachsen Station	Ellef Ringnes Island, Nunavut	Canada	1948	1978	
Izluchin Polar Station	Komsomolets Island, Severnaya Zemlya, Krasnoyarsk Krai	Russia; Soviet Union			Abandoned
Kap Harald Moltke	Peary Land, Greenland	Denmark	1972		
Kigilyakh Research Station	Kigilyakh Peninsula, Bolshoy Lyakhovsky Island, New Siberian Islands	Russia; Soviet Union			
Kolyuchin Polar Station	Kolyuchin Island, Chukotka	Russia; Soviet Union		1990s	Abandoned
Lavrentiya Research Station	Lavrentiya, Chukotka	Russia; Soviet Union			
NEEM Camp	Northern Greenland ice sheet, Greenland	Denmark	2008	2015	
North Ice	Northern Greenland ice sheet, Greenland	United Kingdom	1952	1954	
Oststation	Jameson Land, Greenland	Germany	1930	1931	Abandoned
Peschanny Polar Station	Cape Unslicht, Bolshevik Island, Severnaya Zemlya	Russia; Soviet Union			Abandoned
Popov Polar Station	Bely Island, Yamalo-Nenets	Russia; Soviet Union	1933	2001	
Preobrazheniya Polar Station	Preobrazheniya Island, Sakha	Russia; Soviet Union			Abandoned
Provideniya Research Station	Provideniya, Chukotka	Russia; Soviet Union			
Resolute Nunavut Station	Resolute, Nunavut	Canada	1947		
Russky Island Arctic Station	Russky Island, Nordenskiöld Archipelago, Krasnoyarsk Krai	Russia; Soviet Union	1935	1999	
Samuila Polar Station	Samuila Island, Komsomolskaya Pravda Islands, Krasnoyarsk Krai	Russia; Soviet Union			Abandoned
Solnechny Polar Station	Solnechny Bay, Bolshevik Island, Severnaya Zemlya	Russia; Soviet Union	1952		Abandoned
Stolbovoy Meteorological Station	Stolbovoy Island, Sakha	Russia; Soviet Union			Abandoned
Tuktoyaktuk Station	Tuktoyaktuk, Northwest Territories	Canada		1997	
Tyrtov Island Polar Station	Tyrtov Island, Nordenskiöld Archipelago, Krasnoyarsk Krai	Russia; Soviet Union	1940	1975	
Uedineniya Polar Station	Uyedineniya Island, Krasnoyarsk Krai	Russia; Soviet Union		1996	
Ushakov Island Polar Station	Ushakov Island, Krasnoyarsk Krai	Russia; Soviet Union	1954	1980s	
Vavilov Meteorological Station	October Revolution Island, Severnaya Zemlya	Russia; Soviet Union	1974	1988	
Willem Barents Biological Station	Meduza Bay, Krasnoyarsk Krai	Russia; Soviet Union			
Wrangel Island Cape Blossom Station	Cape Blossom, Wrangel Island, Chukotka	Russia; Soviet Union			
Wrangel Island Ushakovskoye Station	Ushakovskoye, Wrangel Island, Chukotka	Russia; Soviet Union			
Yenisei Ecological Station	Mirnoye, Turukhansky District, Krasnoyarsk Krai	Russia; Soviet Union			

=== Drifting ice stations ===
Station name	Head of the first shift	Drift start date	Drift end date	Drift start coordinate	Drift end coordinate	Drift distance	
						(km^{2})	(sq mi)
North Pole-1	I.D.Papanin	May 21, 1937	February 19, 1938	89°25′N 78°40′W	70°40′N 19°16′W	2,850	1,770
North Pole-2	M.M.Somov	April 2, 1950	April 11, 1951	76°03′N 166°36′W	81°44′N 163°48′W	2,600	1,600
Fletcher's Ice Island		1952	1978				
North Pole-3	A.F.Trioshnikov	April 4, 1954	April 20, 1955	85°58′N 175°00′W	86°00′N 24°00′W	1,865	1,159
North Pole-4	E.I.Tolstikov	April 8, 1954	April 19, 1957	75°48′N 178°25′W	85°52′N 00°00′W	6,970	4,330
North Pole-5	N.A.Volkov	April 21, 1955	October 8, 1956	82°10′N 156°51′E	84°18′N 63°20′E	3,630	2,260
North Pole-6	K.A.Sychev	April 19, 1956	September 14, 1959	74°24′N 177°04′W	82°06′N 03°56′E	8,650	5,370
North Pole-7	V.A.Vedernikov	April 23, 1957	April 11, 1959	82°06′N 164°11′W	85°14′N 33°03′W	3,520	2,190
North Pole-8	V.M.Rogachyov	April 27, 1959	March 19, 1962	76°11′N 164°24′W	83°15′N 132°30′W	6,090	3,780
North Pole-9	V.A.Shamontyev	April 26, 1960	March 28, 1961	77°23′N 163°00′E	86°36′N 76°00′W	2,660	1,650
North Pole-10	N.A.Kornilov	October 17, 1961	April 29, 1964	75°27′N 177°10′E	88°32′N 90°30′E	3,960	2,460
North Pole-11	N.N.Bryazgin	April 16, 1962	April 20, 1963	77°10′N 165°58′W	81°10′N 139°34′W	2,400	1,500
North Pole-12	L.N.Belyakov	April 30, 1963	April 25, 1965	76°50′N 165°34′W	81°06′N 145°47′W	1,595	991
North Pole-13	A.Ya. Buzuyev	April 22, 1964	April 20, 1967	73°55′N 161°19′W	87°55′N 03°32′E	3,545	2,203
North Pole-14	Yu. B.Konstantinov	May 1, 1965	February 12, 1966	72°42′N 175°25′W	76°59′N 154°49′E	1,040	650
North Pole-15	V.V.Panov	April 15, 1966	March 25, 1968	78°49′N 168°08′E	85°45′N 10°30′W	2,330	1,450
North Pole-16	Yu. B.Konstantinov	April 10, 1968	March 22, 1972	75°31′N 172°00′W	86°00′N 85°27′W	5,850	3,640
North Pole-17	N.I.Blinov	April 18, 1968	October 16, 1969	80°30′N 165°26′E	86°48′N 25°20′E	1,750	1,090
North Pole-18	N.N.Ovchinnikov	October 9, 1969	October 24, 1971	75°10′N 165°02′W	86°06′N 153°51′E	5,240	3,260
North Pole-19 7	A.N.Chilingarov	November 7, 1969	April 16, 1973	74°54′N 160°13′E	83°08′N 16°17′E	6,705	4,166
North Pole-20	Yu. P.Tikhonov	April 22, 1970	May 17, 1972	75°56′N 175°22′E	81°44′N 166°47′W	3,780	2,350
North Pole-21	G.I.Kizino	April 30, 1972	May 17, 1974	74°06′N 178°15′E	86°16′N 143°35′E	3,605	2,240
North Pole-22	V.G.Moroz	September 13, 1973	April 8, 1982	76°16′N 168°31′W	86°10′N 00°00′W	17,069	10,606
North Pole-23	V.M.Piguzov	December 5, 1975	November 1, 1978	73°51′N 178°25′W	87°40′N 22°31′W	5,786	3,595
North Pole-24	I.K.Popov	June 23, 1978	November 19, 1980	76°45′N 163°00′E	86°03′N 29°40′E	5,652	3,512
North Pole-25	V.S.Sidorov	May 16, 1981	April 20, 1984	75°01′N 168°35′E	85°50′N 122°15′W	5,754	3,575
North Pole-26	V.S.Sidorov	May 21, 1983	April 9, 1986	78°30′N 174°46′E	82°46′N 170°31′W	5,380	3,340
North Pole-27	Yu. P.Tikhonov	June 2, 1984	May 20, 1987	78°31′N 160°30′E	86°28′N 09°02′W	5,655	3,514
North Pole-28	A.F.Chernyshov	May 21, 1986	January 23, 1989	80°40′N 168°29′E	79°40′N 03°09′E	7,634	4,744
North Pole-29	V.V.Lukin	June 10, 1987	August 19, 1988	80°22.8′N 112°59′E	84°42.8′N 56°34′W	2,686	1,669
North Pole-30	V.M.Piguzov	October 9, 1987	April 4, 1991	74°18′N 171°24′W	82°31′N 126°26′W	7,675	4,769
North Pole-31	V.S.Sidorov	October 22, 1988	July 25, 1991	76°35′N 153°10′W	73°33′N 161°04′W	5,475	3,402
North Pole-32	V.S.Koshelev	April 25, 2003	March 6, 2004	87°52.5′N 148°03′E	84°41′N 03°33′W	2,418	1,502
North Pole-33	A.A.Vishnevsky	September 9, 2004	October 5, 2005	85°05′N 156°31′E	86°14′N 95°54′E	3,156	1,961
North Pole-34	T.V.Petrovsky	September 19, 2005	May 25, 2006	85°39′N 115°19′E	87°26′N 07°39′E	2,032	1,263
North Pole-35	Vladimir Chupun	September 21, 2007	July 22, 2008	81°30′N 103°54′E	81°00′N 31°18′E	3,614	2,246
North Pole-36	Yuri Katrayev	September 7, 2008	August 24, 2009	82°32′N 144°56′E	85°53′N 26°41′W	2,905	1,805
North Pole-37	Sergey Lesenkov	September 7, 2009	May 31, 2010	81°28′N 164°35′W	80°04′N 140°40′W	2,076	1,290
North Pole-38	Tomash Petrovskiy	October 14, 2010	September 20, 2011	76°07′N 176°32′W	83°53′N 154°18′W	3,024	1,879
North Pole-39	Alexander Ipatov	October 2, 2011	September 15, 2012	84°10′N 148°49′W	83°57′N 96°44′W	1,885	1,171
North Pole-40	Nikolai Fomichev	October 1, 2012	June 7, 2013	85°21′N 142°53′W	82°25′N 130°25′W	1,736	1,079
North Pole-2015	Dmitrij Mamadaliev	April 11, 2015	August 9, 2015	89°34′N 17°08′W	86°15′N 07°52′W	714	444
MOSAiC Expedition	Markus Rex	October 4, 2019	July 30, 2020	85°00′N 137°00′E	N/A	1,700	1,100

== Gallery ==
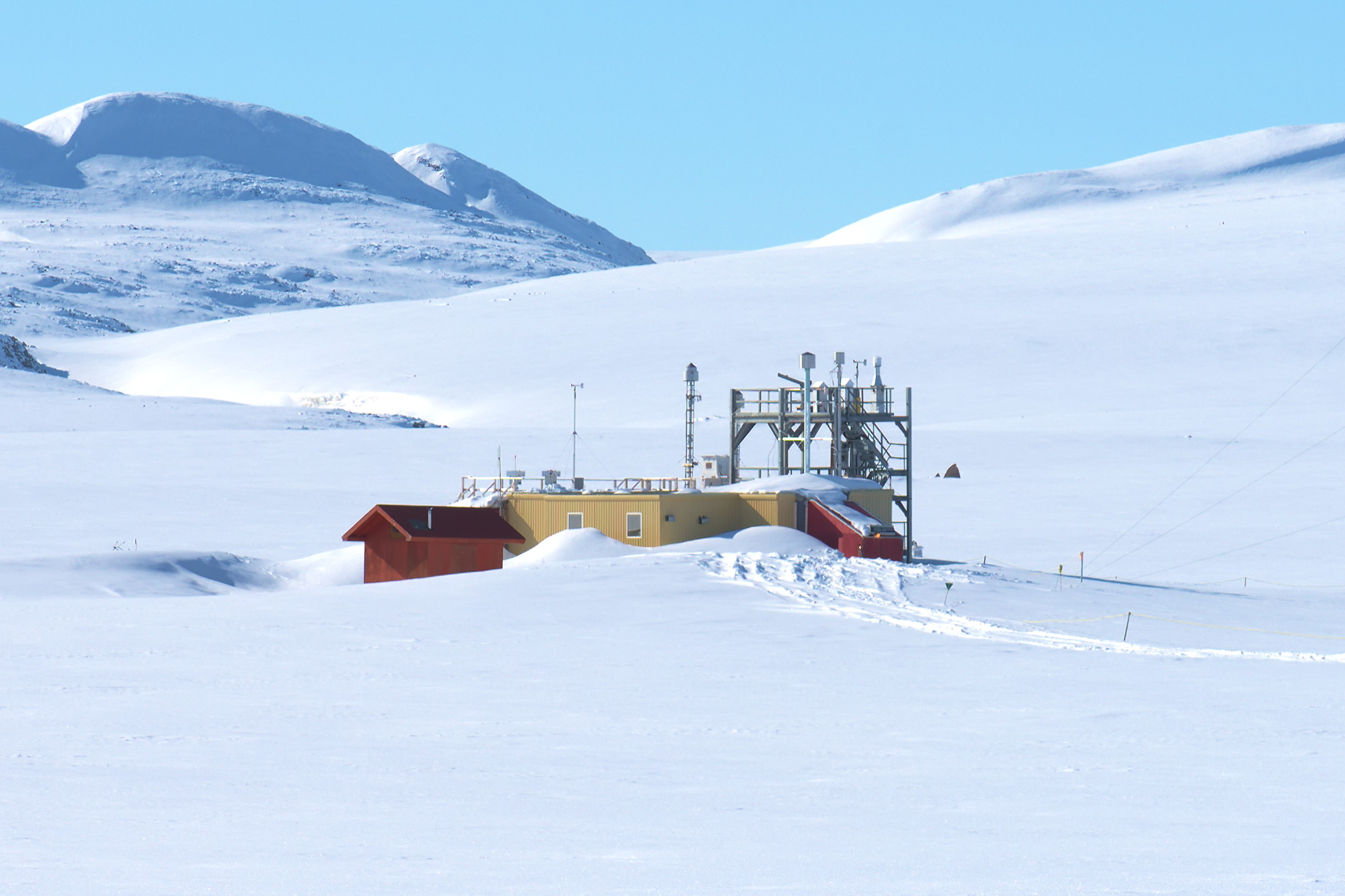
View of the Dr. Neil Trivett Global Atmosphere Watch Observatory, Alert, Nunavut, Canada

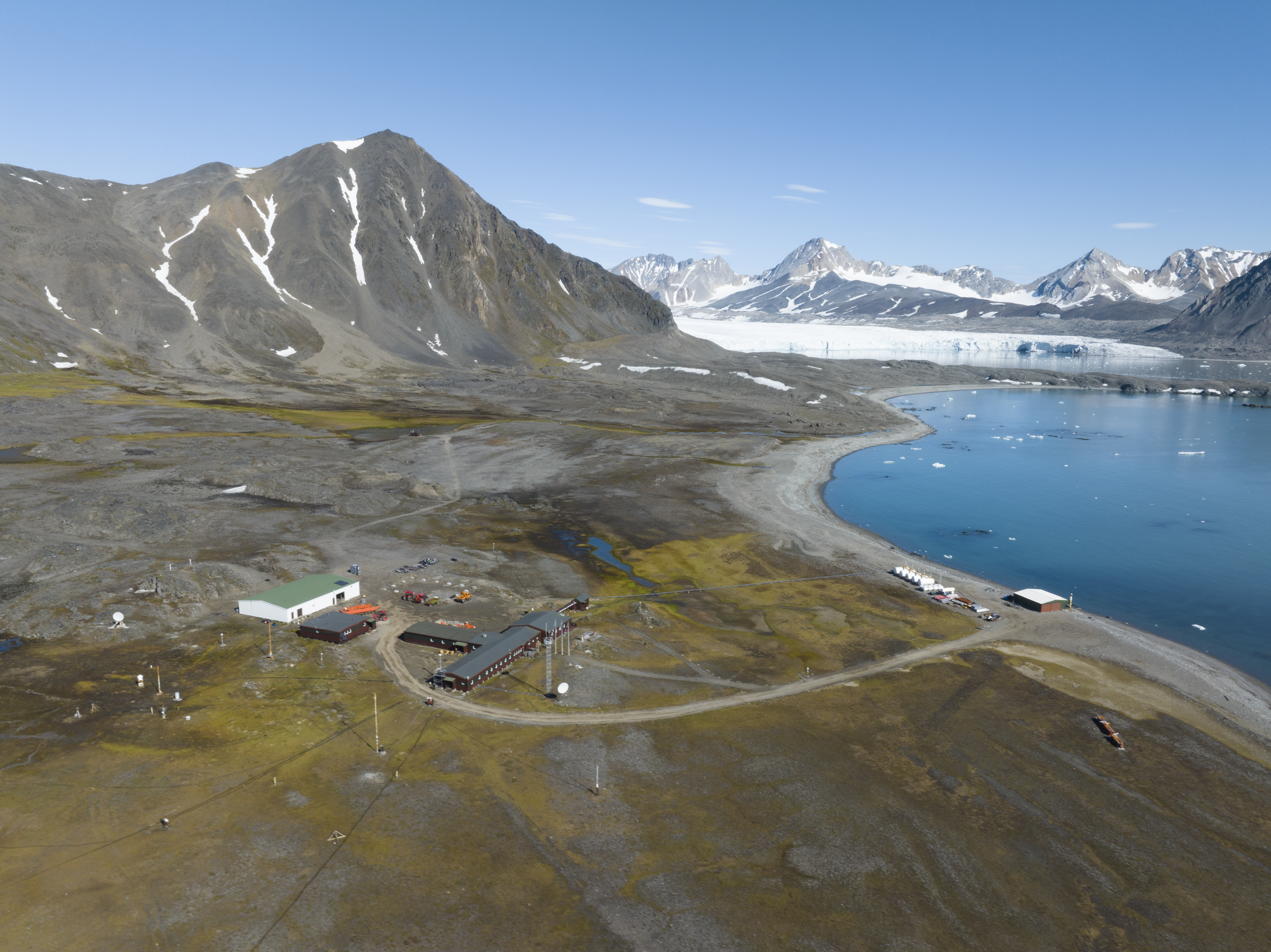
View of the Polish Polar Station, Hornsund, Svalbard (Norway)

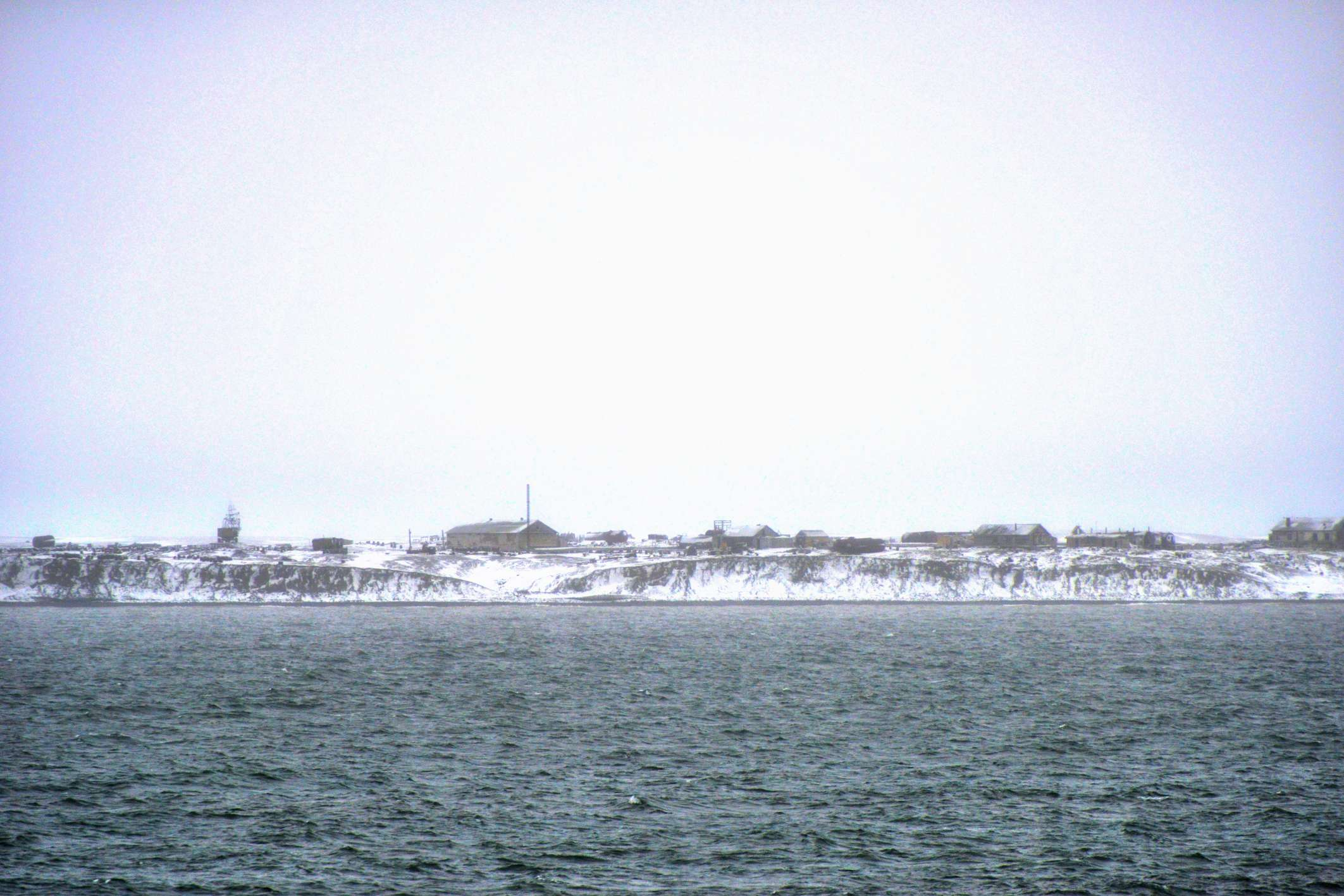
View of the Arctic research station on Wiese Island, Russia

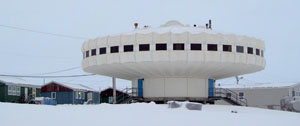
View of the Igloolik Research Centre, Igloolik, Nunavut, Canada

== See also ==
- List of Arctic research programs
- Research stations in Antarctica
- List of northernmost settlements
- Winter-over syndrome
- Barneo, one-month tourist ice camp annual since 2002
