= Fulton surface-to-air recovery system =

System used to retrieve persons on the ground using an aircraft

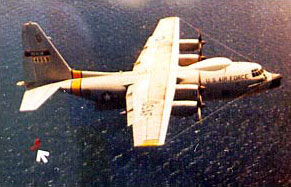
The Fulton system in use

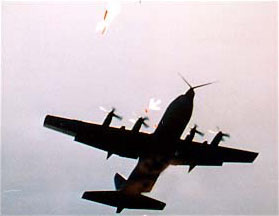
The Fulton system in use from below

The Fulton surface-to-air recovery system (STARS), also known as Skyhook, is a system used by the Central Intelligence Agency (CIA), United States Air Force, and United States Navy for retrieving individuals on the ground using aircraft such as the MC-130E Combat Talon I and B-17 Flying Fortress. It involves using an overall-type harness and a self-inflating balloon with an attached lift line. An MC-130E engages the line with its V-shaped yoke and the person is reeled on board. Red flags on the lift line guide the pilot during daylight recoveries; lights on the lift line are used for night recoveries. Recovery kits were designed for one- and two-man retrievals.

This system was developed by inventor Robert Edison Fulton, Jr., for the CIA in the early 1950s. It was an evolution from a glider snatch pick-up, a similar system that was used during World War II by American and British forces to retrieve both personnel and downed assault gliders following airborne operations. Snatch pick-up did not use a balloon, but a line stretched between a pair of poles set in the ground on either side of the person or glider to be retrieved. An aircraft, usually a C-47 Skytrain, trailed a grappling hook that engaged the line, which was attached to the intended cargo.

== Development of the recovery system ==
Experiments with the recovery system began in 1950 by the CIA and Air Force. Using a weather balloon, nylon line, and weights of 10 to 15 pounds (4.5 to 6.8 kg), Fulton made numerous pickup attempts as he sought to develop a reliable procedure. Successful at last, Fulton took photographs and sent them to Admiral Luis de Florez, who had become the director of technical research at the CIA. Believing that the program could best be handled by the military, de Florez put Fulton in touch with the Office of Naval Research (ONR), where he obtained a development contract from ONR's Air Programs Division.

Over the next few years, Fulton refined the air and ground equipment for the pickup system. Based at El Centro, California, he conducted numerous flights over the Colorado Desert using a Navy P-2V Neptune. He gradually increased the weight of the pickup until the line began to break. A braided nylon line with a test strength of 4,000 pounds (1,800 kg) solved the problem. A major problem was the design of the locking device, or sky anchor, that secured the line to the aircraft. Fulton considered the solution of this issue the most demanding part of the entire developmental process.

Further tests were conducted at Eglin Air Force Base, Florida, from 1 August 1959, using RB-69A, 54-4307, a CIA P2V-7U, according to an agency document.

After experiments with instrumented dummies, Fulton continued to experiment with live pigs, as pigs have a nervous system close to humans. Lifted off the ground, the pig began to spin as it flew through the air at 125 miles per hour (200 km/h). It arrived on board uninjured, but in a disoriented state. When it recovered, it attacked the crew.

By 1958, the Fulton aerial retrieval system, or "Skyhook", was finished. The ground system could be dropped from an aircraft and contained the necessary equipment for a pickup, including a harness, for cargo or a person, attached to 500 feet (150 m) of high-strength, braided nylon line and a dirigible-shaped balloon inflated by a helium bottle.

Illustration of operating principle of the Fulton recovery system

The pickup aircraft was equipped with two tubular steel "horns", 30 feet (9 m) long and spread at a 70° angle from its nose. The aircraft flew into the line, aiming at a bright mylar marker placed at the 425 foot (130 m) level. As the line was caught between the forks on the nose of the aircraft, the balloon was released and a spring-loaded trigger mechanism (sky anchor) secured the line to the aircraft. After the initial pickup, the line was snared by the pickup crew using a J-hook and attached to a powered winch and the person or cargo pulled on board. To prevent the pickup line from interfering with the aircraft's propellers in the case of an unsuccessful catch, the aircraft had deflector cables strung from the nose to the wingtips.

Later the US Navy tested the Fulton system fitted to modified S-2 Tracker carrier-based antisubmarine patrol aircraft for use in rescuing downed pilots. It is unknown whether a Fulton equipped S-2 was ever used on a combat mission.

== First human pickups ==
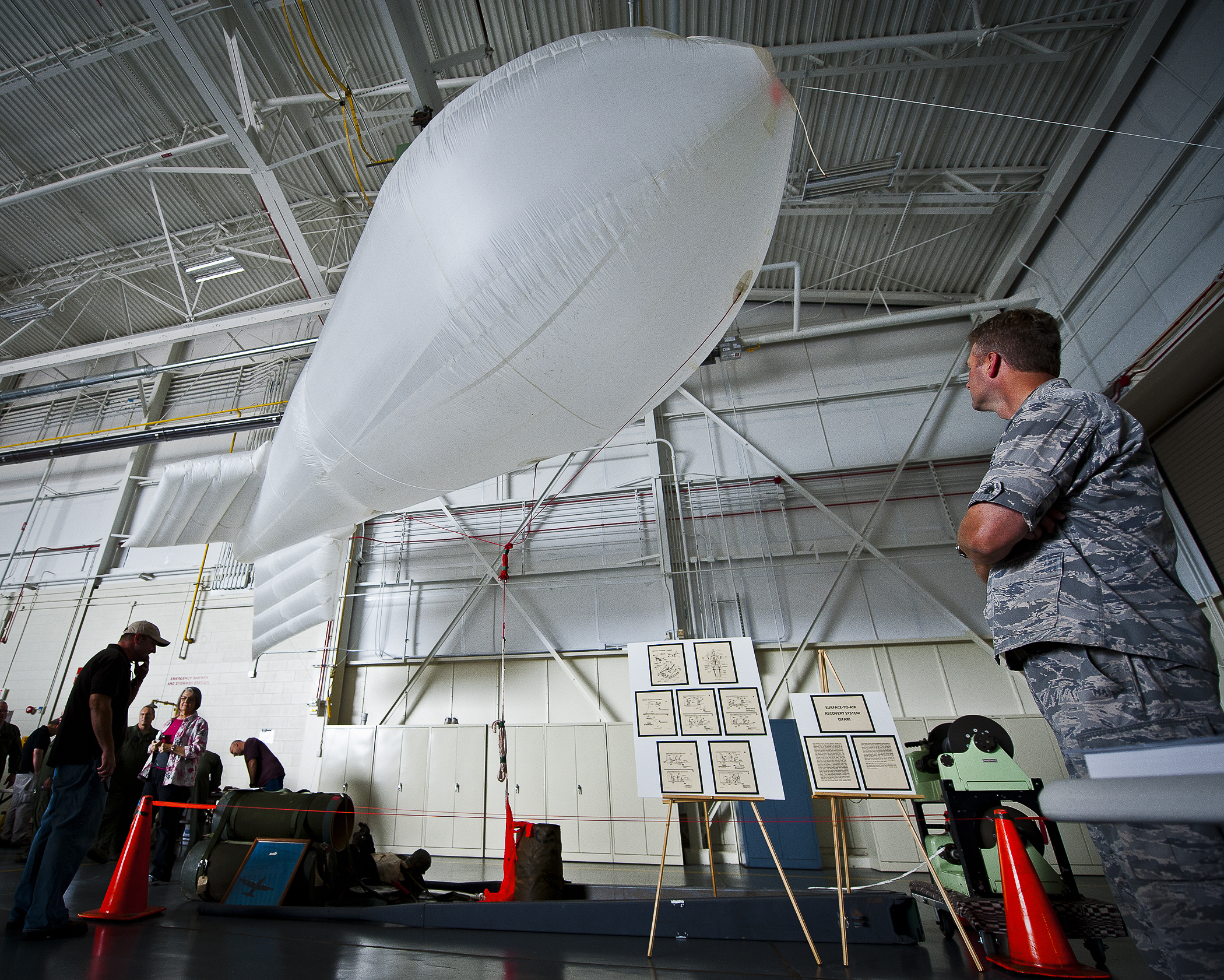
The Fulton balloon

The CIA had secretly trained Special Activities Division paramilitary officers to use a predecessor system for human pickups as early as 1952. The first human recovery mission authorized for operational use of this "all American system" took place in Manchuria on 29 November 1952. CIA C-47 pilots Norman Schwartz and Robert Snoddy were trained in the aerial pickup technique towards the end of 1952. CIA paramilitary officers John T. Downey and Richard G. Fecteau, themselves hurriedly trained in the procedure during the week of 24 November, were to recover a courier who was in contact with anti-communist sympathizers in the area. The mission failed when Chinese forces downed the aircraft with small arms fire, capturing survivors Downey and Fecteau. The British allegedly also used the American system for personnel.

The first human pickup using Fulton's STARS took place on 12 August 1958, when Staff Sergeant Levi W. Woods of the U.S. Marine Corps was winched on board the Neptune. Because of the geometry involved, the person being picked up experienced less of a shock than during a parachute opening. After the initial contact, which was described by one individual as similar to "a kick in the pants", the person rose vertically at a slow rate to about 100 ft (30 m), then began to streamline behind the aircraft. Extension of arms and legs prevented spinning as the individual was winched on board. The process took about six minutes.

In August 1960, Capt. Edward A. Rodgers, commander of the Naval Air Development Unit, flew a Skyhook-equipped P2V to Point Barrow, Alaska, to conduct pickup tests under the direction of Dr. Max Brewer, head of the Navy's Arctic Research Laboratory. With Fulton on board to monitor the equipment, the Neptune picked up mail from Floating Ice Island T-3, also known as Fletcher's Ice Island, retrieved artifacts, including mastodon tusks, from an archaeological party on the tundra, and secured geological samples from Peters Lake Camp. The high point of the trials came when the P2V dropped a rescue package near the icebreaker USS Burton Island. Retrieved by a ship's boat, the package was brought on deck, the balloon inflated, and the pickup accomplished.

In July 1967, two MACV-SOG operators were retrieved by an MC-130E using the Fulton Skyhook system while operating in Vietnam.

== Project Coldfeet ==
The first operational use of Skyhook was Project Coldfeet, an examination of the Soviet drift station NP-8, abandoned on 19 March 1962. Two agents parachuted to station NP 8 on 28 May 1962. After 72 hours at the site, on 1 June 1962, a pick-up was made of the Soviet equipment and both men. The mission yielded information on the Soviet Union's Arctic research activities, including evidence of advanced research on acoustical systems to detect under-ice submarines and efforts to develop Arctic anti-submarine warfare techniques.

== Later use ==
The Fulton system was used from 1965 to 1996 on several variants of the C-130 Hercules including the MC-130s and HC-130s. It was also used on the C-123 Provider.

Despite the apparent high-risk nature of the system, only one fatal accident occurred in 17 years of use. On 26 April 1982, SFC Clifford Wilson Strickland was picked up by a Lockheed MC-130 Combat Talon of the 7th Special Operations Squadron at CFB Lahr, Germany, during Flintlock 82 exercise, using the Fulton STARS recovery system, but fell to his death due to a failed bushing at the top of the left yoke pivot bolt.

The increased availability of long-range helicopters such as the MH-53 Pave Low, HH-60 Pave Hawk, and MH-47 Chinook, and the V-22 Osprey tilt-rotor aircraft, all with aerial refueling capability, caused this system to be used less often. In September 1996, the Air Force Special Operations Command ceased maintaining the capability to deploy this system.

== In popular culture ==
The Skyhook has been featured in a number of films and video games. It was seen in the 1965 James Bond film Thunderball, where James Bond and his companion Domino Derval are rescued at sea by a modified Boeing B-17 equipped with the Fulton system at the end of the movie. In 1968, it was used in the John Wayne movie The Green Berets to fly an NVA officer to South Vietnam.

The Skyhook system was also featured in the 2008 film The Dark Knight. First mentioned by Lucius Fox as a means of re-boarding an aircraft without its landing, the system is attached to a Lockheed L-100 Hercules.

In video games, the Skyhook can be seen in I.G.I.-2: Covert Strike where a C-130 extracts the protagonist connected with a weather balloon. The system is briefly mentioned during a conversation in Metal Gear Solid 3: Snake Eater, and a heavily fictionalized interpretation of the Skyhook forms a core gameplay mechanic in Metal Gear Solid: Peace Walker, and Metal Gear Solid V: The Phantom Pain. More realistic depictions can be found in PUBG: Battlegrounds, Payday 2, Battlefield 4, Call of Duty: Modern Warfare, and its sequel, Call of Duty: Modern Warfare III.

== See also ==
- Military Assistance Command, Vietnam – Studies and Observations Group
- Mid-air retrieval
- Special Patrol Insertion/Extraction
- United States Air Force § Personnel Recovery
- Glider snatch pick-up
