= Yamal (icebreaker) =

Arktika-class icebreaker built in 1992

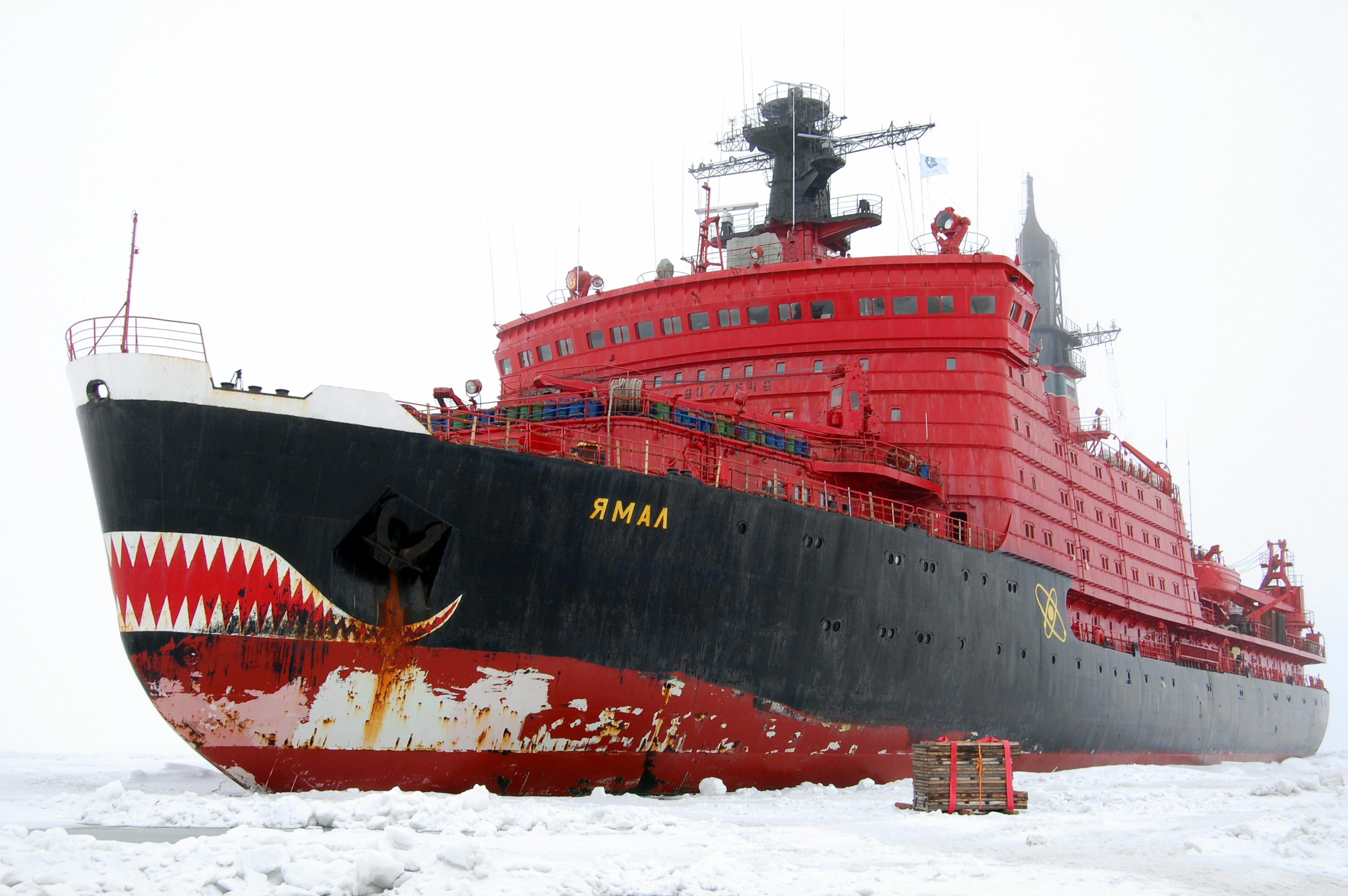
- Yamal during the removal of the North Pole-36 drifting station in 2009.

History

Russia
- Name: Yamal (Ямал)
- Namesake: Yamal Peninsula
- Owner: Russian Federation
- Operator: FSUE Atomflot
- Port of registry: Murmansk, Russia
- Builder: Baltic Shipyard
- Laid down: 1986
- Launched: 1989
- Commissioned: October 1992
- Identification: IMO number: 9077549; MMSI number: 273132400; Callsign: UCJT
- Status: In service

General characteristics
- Class & type: Arktika-class icebreaker
- Displacement: 23,000 tons
- Length: 148 m (486 ft)
- Beam: 30 m (98 ft)
- Draught: 11 m (36 ft)
- Depth: 17.2 m (56 ft)
- Installed power: Two OK-900A nuclear reactors (2 × 171 MW); Two steam turbogenerators (2 × 27.6 MW)
- Propulsion: Nuclear-turbo-electric; Three shafts (3 × 18 MW)
- Speed: 20.6 knots (38.2 km/h; 23.7 mph) (maximum)
- Endurance: 7.5 months
- Crew: 189
- Aircraft carried: 1 × Mi-2, Mi-8 or Ka-27 helicopter
- Aviation facilities: Helipad and hangar for one helicopter

Yamal (Russian: Ямал) is a Russian Arktika-class nuclear-powered icebreaker operated by Atomflot (formerly by the Murmansk Shipping Company). She is named after the Yamal Peninsula in Northwest Siberia; the name means End of the Land in Nenets.

Laid down in Leningrad in 1986, and commissioned in October 1992, after the breakup of the Soviet Union, she filled her designed role of keeping shipping lanes open and also carried passengers on Arctic excursions. In July 1994 Yamal took an excursion to the North Pole, with the NSF (National Science Foundation – US), to celebrate the official maiden voyage. While at the exact North Pole (verified by GPS & Inmarsat satellite coordinates) the crew and passengers celebrated with a barbeque – the ambient temperature was −23 °C (−9 °F) (wind gusts were measured at −40 °C (−40 °F)). Because of the ship 90/90 coordinates the ship captain (Smirnov) organized a swimming party with Will Rountree (US) being recorded as the first person to ever swim there (21 July 1994) – water temperature was below freezing, ranging from 0 to −1.8 °C (32 to 29 °F). In 2007 Lewis Gordon Pugh swam a kilometer at the North Pole, having sailed there aboard Yamal.

Yamal is equipped with a double hull. The outer hull is 48 mm (1.89 in) thick where ice is met and 25 mm (0.98 in) elsewhere and has a polymer coating to reduce friction. There is water ballast between the inner and outer hulls which can be shifted in order to aid icebreaking. Icebreaking is also assisted by an air bubbling system which can deliver 24 m^{3}/s (850 cu ft/s) of air from jets 9 m (30 ft) below the surface. Yamal can break ice while making way either forwards or backwards.

Yamal is one of the Russian Arktika family of icebreakers, the most powerful icebreakers in the world. These ships must cruise in cold water to cool their reactors, so they cannot pass through the tropics to undertake voyages in the Southern Hemisphere.

Yamal carries one helicopter and several Zodiac boats. Radio and satellite communications systems are installed which can provide navigation, telephone, fax, and email services. Amenities include a large dining room (capable of holding all 100 passengers in one sitting), a library, passenger lounge, auditorium, volleyball court, gymnasium, heated indoor swimming pool, a sauna, and an infirmary. She is equipped with 50 passenger cabins and suites, all with toilets, exterior windows, a television, and a desk.

Yamal also played a significant role in creation of annual travel expeditions to the North Pole, being one of the few vessels capable of getting there and bringing tourists with it in safety. Since 1993 the icebreaker was operated by Murmansk Shipping Company and in 2001–2008 the operation was made by Murmansk Shipping Company and Poseidon Expeditions. Yamal has made a total of 47 voyages to the North Pole.

In August 2025 a woman, Marina Starovoitova, became the captain of Yamal. She is the world's first female captain of a nuclear icebreaker. She rose through the ranks from a sailor to Senior Assistant Captain and then Captain.

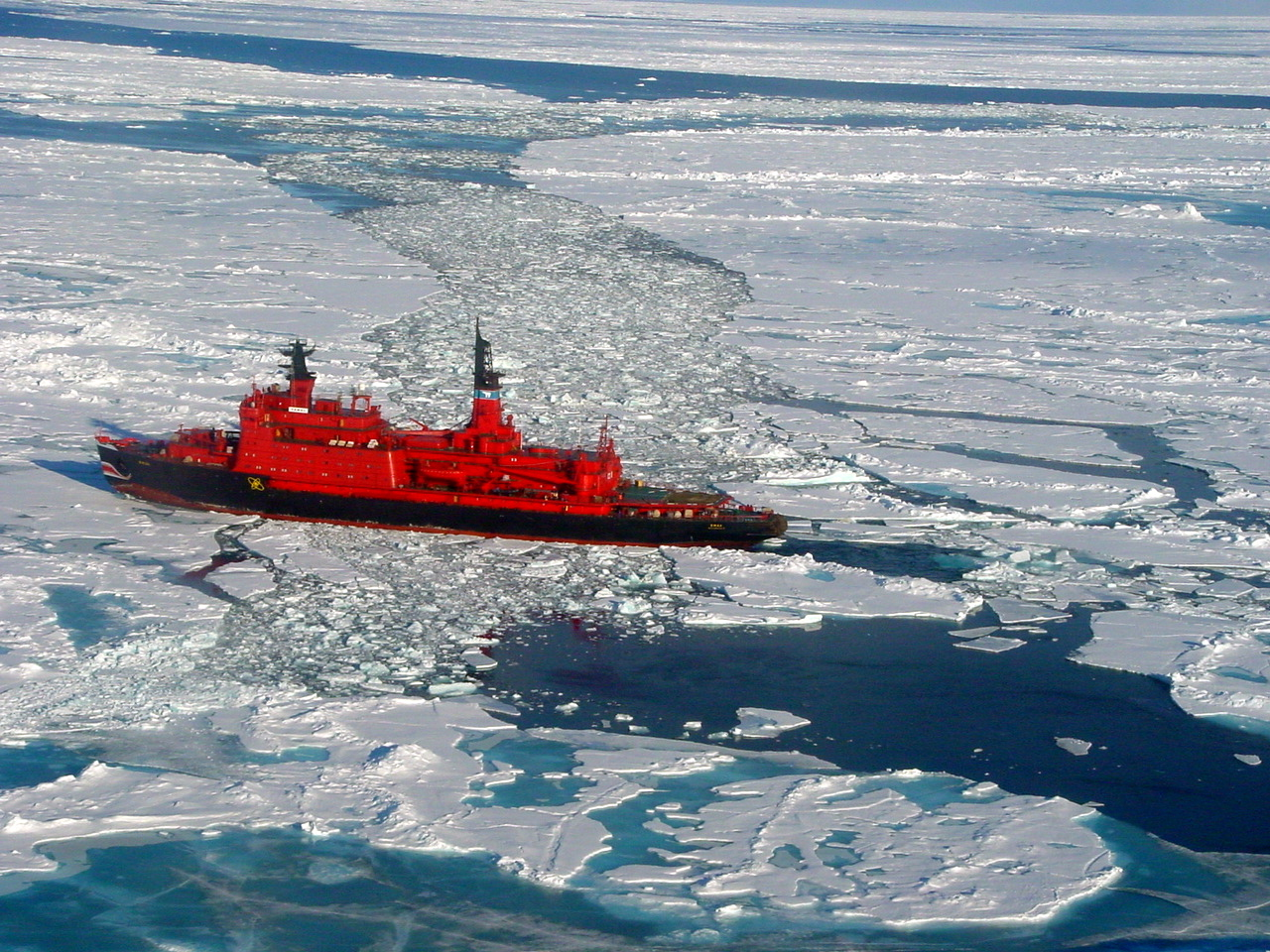
Yamal on her way to the North Pole, 2001

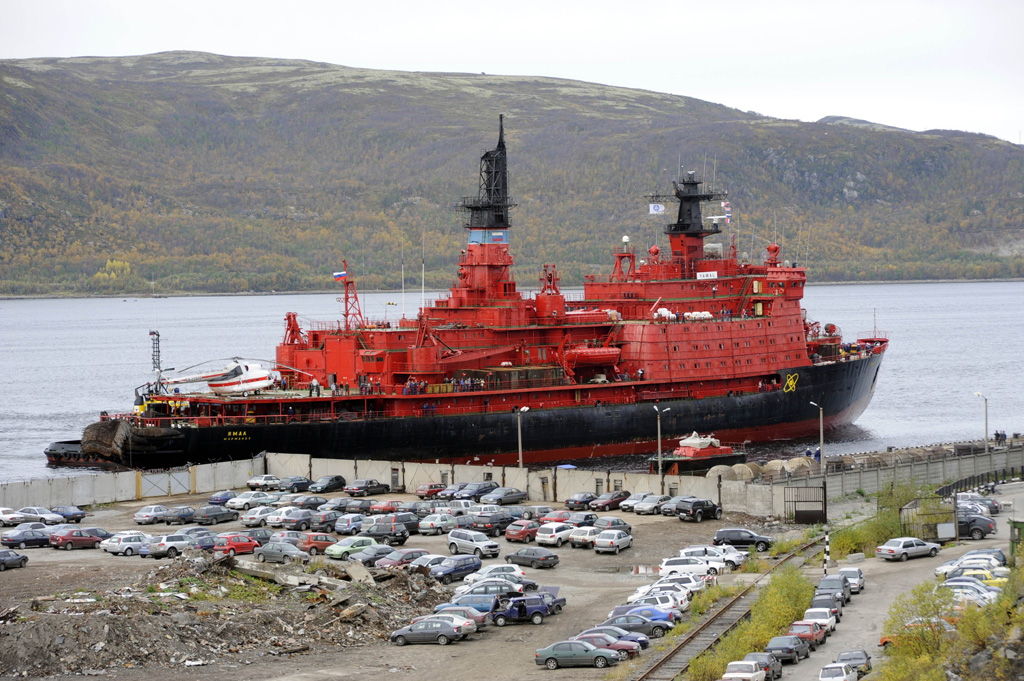
Yamal in Murmansk, 2009

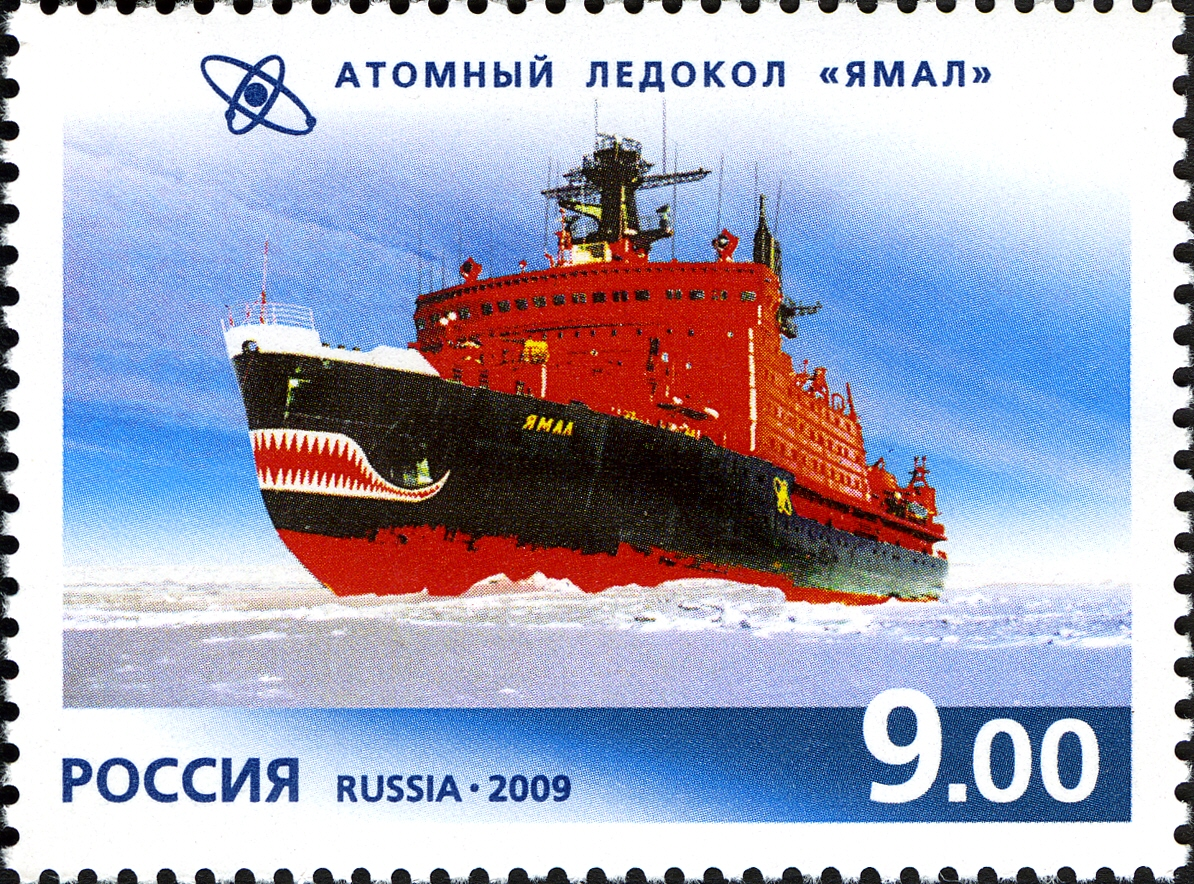
Yamal on a Russian stamp

== Events ==
North Pole-36 and North Pole-37

From August to September 2009 the icebreaker took part in the scheduled evacuation of drifting ice stations. Each station houses 18 polar explorers, dogs, and more than 150 tons of cargo. The evacuation of station personnel and cargo from a drifting ice floe requires three days of continuous, round-the-clock work. This high-latitude Arctic work was supervised by expedition leader Vladimir Sokolov.

== Incidents and accidents ==
- On 23 December 1996, a crew member was killed when a fire broke out on board the icebreaker. The nuclear reactor powering the ship was not affected by the fire. The crew extinguished the blaze within 30 minutes.
- On 16 March 2009 Yamal collided with the product tanker MT Indiga in Yenisei Gulf in the Kara Sea. While the tanker suffered a 9.5-metre (31 ft) crack on the main deck, no damage was reported for Yamal.
