= Akademik Federov Canyon =

Undersea canyon in the Weddell Sea

Coordinates: 72°45′S 32°0′W

Akademik Federov Canyon is an undersea canyon in the Weddell Sea named for the Russian research vessel that worked in the northern Weddell Sea (1989). Dr. Heinrich Hinze of the Alfred Wegener Institute for Polar and Marine Research, Bremerhaven, Germany, proposed the name, which was approved in June 1997.
