= Poseidon Expeditions =

British tour operator

- Industry: Cruise line
- Founded: 1999; 27 years ago
- Headquarters: Limassol, Cyprus
- Services: Polar Expeditions; Polar Cruises; Adventure Travel
- Website: poseidonexpeditions.com

Poseidon Expeditions, a travel company founded in 1999, offers expedition cruises to the polar regions of Arctic, Antarctic and the North Pole (until 2022). With its headquarters in Cyprus and offices / representations in the UK, US, Germany and China the company markets travel programs worldwide.

== History ==
- 1999: Poseidon Expeditions founded in the UK.
- 2001: the first North Pole cruise aboard the 100-passenger nuclear-powered Yamal icebreaker.
- 2003: two cruises to Franz Josef Land and Svalbard.
- 2004: the inaugural "Transpolar Bridge" expedition cruise through the Northeast Passage, including Franz Josef Land, North Pole, Severnaya Zemlya archipelago, Taymyr Peninsula, Lena River delta, New Siberian Islands and Wrangel Island aboard the Yamal icebreaker.
- 2005: the inaugural "Pearls of the Russian Arctic" expedition cruise including Novaya Zemlya, Oranskie Islands, Wiese Island and Severnaya Zemlya archipelago.
- 2007: Poseidon Expeditions introduced a new destination to the travel market: the Russian Far East (Kamchatka, Kuril Islands, Wrangel Island).
- 2008: the company chartered the 128-passenger nuclear-powered icebreaker 50 Years of Victory during its first touristic season.
- 2013, July 30: expedition cruise reached the North Pole for the 100th time via icebreaker navigation.
- 2014: start of Antarctic destinations with voyage to the Falkland Islands & South Georgia.
- 2015: new all-suite expedition ship, MV Sea Spirit, began operating polar cruises to the Arctic and Antarctic. New destination to the global market was introduced: expedition cruises to the British Isles.
- 2016: West Greenland cruises added to the destinations list.
- 2022: Poseidon Expeditions shuts down North Pole route on board of nuclear-powered icebreaker and focuses on the Antarctic and Arctic destinations. New route to rarely visited island of Kvitøya is added to the list to observe polar bears and walrus rookeries.
- 2024: Company introduces theme cruises: a special journey for photographers, regular photo cruise, focused on capturing images under expert guidance; and a Total Solar eclipse Cruise to Greenland for 2027.

== Awards ==
Poseidon Expeditions long-time operation in the expedition travel market is acknowledged by several world-level awards in travel industry:

- 2021: World's Leading Polar Expedition Operator 2021 at the 28th annual World Travel Awards.
- 2022: Best Polar Expedition Cruise Operator 2022 at the International Travel Awards .
- 2023: Best Polar Expedition Cruise Operator 2023 at the International Travel Awards.
- 2024: Best Polar Expedition Cruise Operator 2024 at the International Travel Awards.
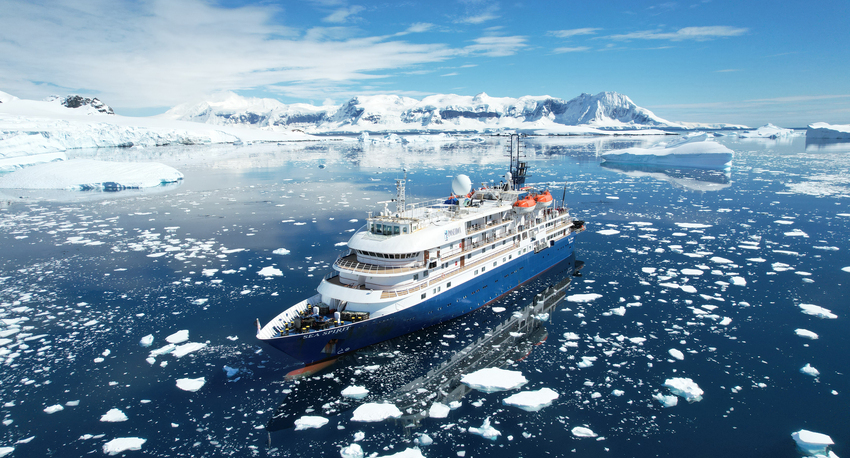
  Sea Spirit vessel in its polar expedition cruise. Poseidon Expeditions.

== Current map of expedition routes ==
As of 2025, Poseidon Expeditions operates expedition cruises to:

- Antarctic Peninsula
- British Isles
- Greenland
- Iceland
- Jan Mayen and Svalbard
- South Georgia and Falklands Islands

== Poseidon Expeditions' fleet ==
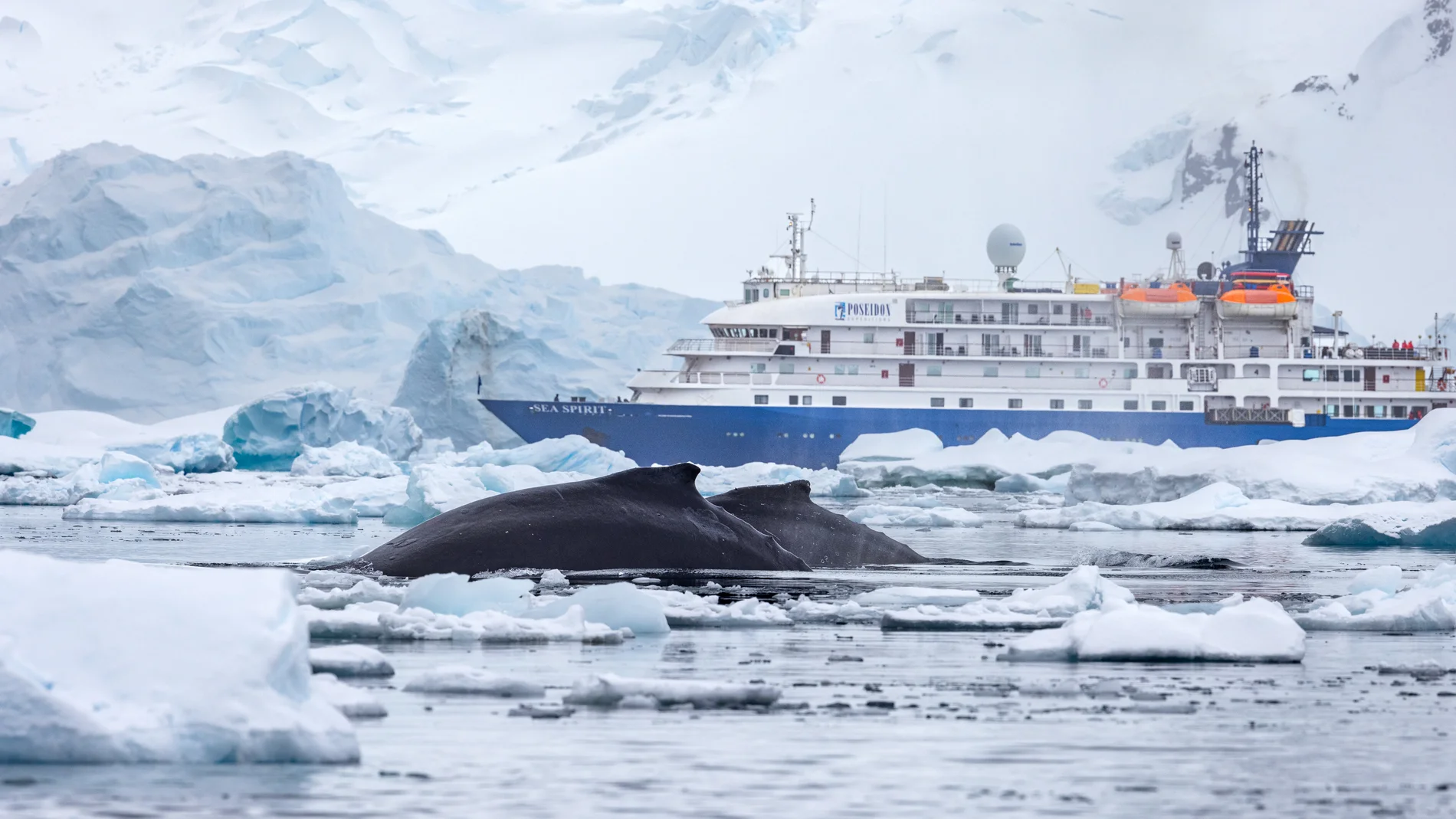
Sea Spirit vessel in Antarctic. Piet van den Bemd, Poseidon Expeditions

For 26 years of polar cruising, Poseidon Expeditions has charted a number of vessels such as the Yamal icebreaker, the 100-passenger, conventionally propelled icebreaker Kapitan Dranitsyn, 115-passenger conventionally propelled Marina Tsvetaeva ship (now MV Ortelius) and the Sea Explorer. From 2008 to 2022 Poseidon Expeditions has operated North Pole cruises aboard the 124-passenger nuclear-powered Russian icebreaker 50 Years of Victory, equipped with helicopter that enabled travelers to explore wild Arctic areas. This icebreaker is capable of breaking through ice up to 2.5 meters (9.2 feet) thick.

Currently Poseidon Expeditions operates its Arctic and Antarctic cruises aboard the Sea Spirit expedition vessel. Due to its size this ship navigates into protected channels and bays that are out of bounds to larger cruise vessels, and allows all the passengers to go offshore at the same time, avoiding any queues. It offers accommodation up to 114 passengers, has an ice-strengthened hull, a fleet of Zodiac boats for observation trips and a set of retractable fin stabilizers for smoother sailing.

== Sustainability initiatives ==
Operating in fragile polar regions, the company is committed to safe and environmentally responsible travel. Poseidon Expeditions is a member of IAATO (International Association of Antarctica Tour Operators) and AECO (Association of Arctic Expedition Cruise Operators) following all strict regulations concerning the cruise operations.

Company supports South Georgia Heritage Trust and Polar Bears International.

Other steps of commitment to the further development of Arctic and Antarctic conservation include active participation of naturalists and scientists in expedition programs. Poseidon Expeditions’ onboard team includes polar specialists: conservationists, prominent guest scientists, marine biologists, ornithologists, climate specialists, geologists and sea ice experts. While involving the passengers into true polar experience, company highlights the importance of keeping the polar regions pristine for future generations.

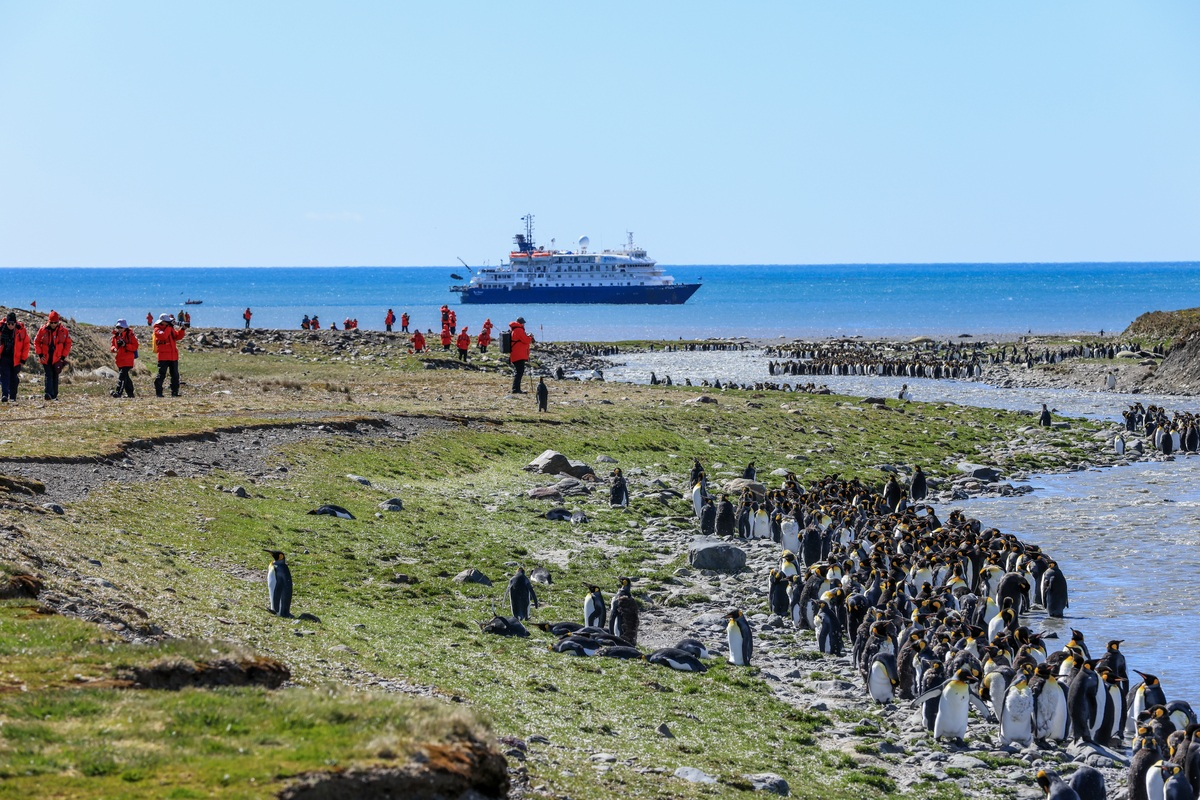
Penguins observation in Antarctic cruise of Poseidon Expeditions

In Spitsbergen Poseidon Expeditions staff take part in the “Clean Up Svalbard” initiative, reducing beach waste on each of tourist landings, often joined by passengers of the cruise.

During shore excursions tourists and staff follow the guidelines established by AECO and IAATO to protect the local flora and fauna, including rigorous bootwashing before and after landings to prevent accidental transmission of biological pathogens between penguin colonies. All passengers vacuum their outwear and backpacks to eliminate any possibility of transporting an alien species of seed or other flora.

Travelers are offered to participate in citizen science projects through observation. Photographs and descriptions become high-value data if the image is of good quality and has a verifiably correct date and location for GLOBE Clouds, cloud observations platform, and Happywhale platform, serving the research community as a data source for studies of many whale and seal species.

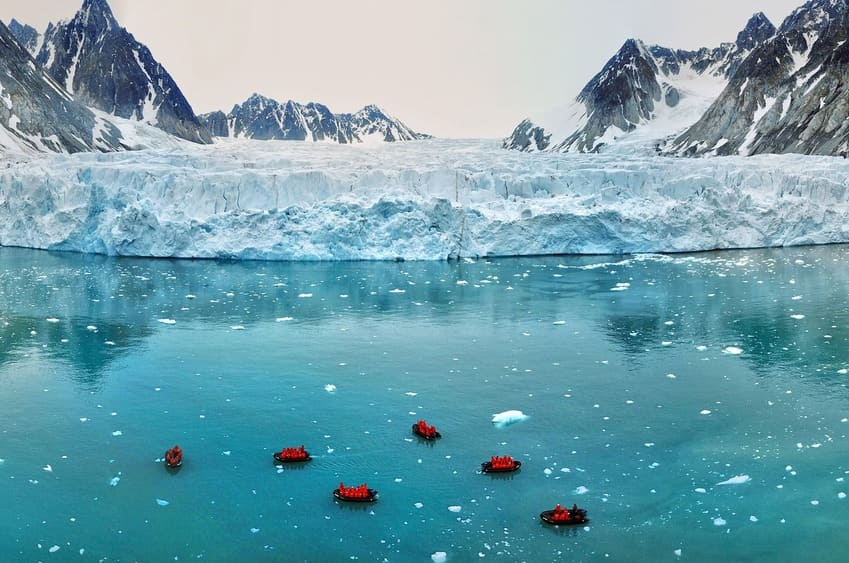
Arctic expedition cruise of Poseidon Expeditions
