= Project Coldfeet =

1962 CIA intelligence mission

Project Coldfeet was a 1962 Central Intelligence Agency (CIA) operation to extract intelligence from an abandoned Soviet Arctic drifting ice station. Due to the nature of its abandonment as the result of unstable ice, the retrieval of the operatives used the Fulton surface-to-air recovery system.

== History ==
What became known as Operation Coldfeet began in May 1961, when a naval aircraft flying an aeromagnetic survey over the Arctic Ocean reported sighting an abandoned Soviet drift station. A few days later, the Soviets announced that they had been forced to leave Station NP 9 (a different station, NP 8 ended up being the target) when the ice runway used to supply it had been destroyed by a pressure ridge, and it was assumed that it would be crushed in the Arctic Ocean.

The prospect of examining an abandoned Soviet ice station attracted the interest of the U.S. Navy's Office of Naval Research (ONR). The previous year, ONR had set an acoustical surveillance network on a U.S. drift station used to monitor Soviet submarines. ONR assumed that the Soviets would have a similar system to keep track of American submarines as they transited the polar ice pack, but there was no direct evidence to support this. Also, ONR wanted to compare Soviet efforts on drift stations with U.S. operations. The problem was how to get to NP 9. It was far too deep into the ice pack to be reached by an icebreaker, and it was out of helicopter range.

To Captain John Cadwalader, who would command Operation Coldfeet, it looked like "a wonderful opportunity" to make use of the Fulton surface-to-air recovery system. Following a recommendation by Dr. Max Britton, head of the Arctic program in the Geography Branch of ONR, Rear Admiral L. D. Coates, Chief of Naval Research, authorized preliminary planning for the mission while he sought final approval from the Chief of Naval Operations. The mission was scheduled for September 1961, a time of good weather and ample daylight. NP 9 would be within 600 miles (970 km) of the U.S. Air Force base at Thule, Greenland, the planned launching point for the operation.

ONR selected two highly qualified investigators for the ground assignment. Major James Smith, USAF, was an experienced paratrooper and Russian linguist who had served on U.S. Drift Stations Alpha and Charlie. Lieutenant Leonard A. LeSchack, USNR, a former Antarctic geophysicist, had set up the surveillance system on T-3 in 1960. Not jump qualified, he quickly went through the Navy parachuting course at Naval Air Station Lakehurst, New Jersey. The two men trained on the Fulton retrieval system over the summer, working in Maryland with an experienced P2V Neptune crew at the Naval Air Test Center at NAS Patuxent River, Maryland.

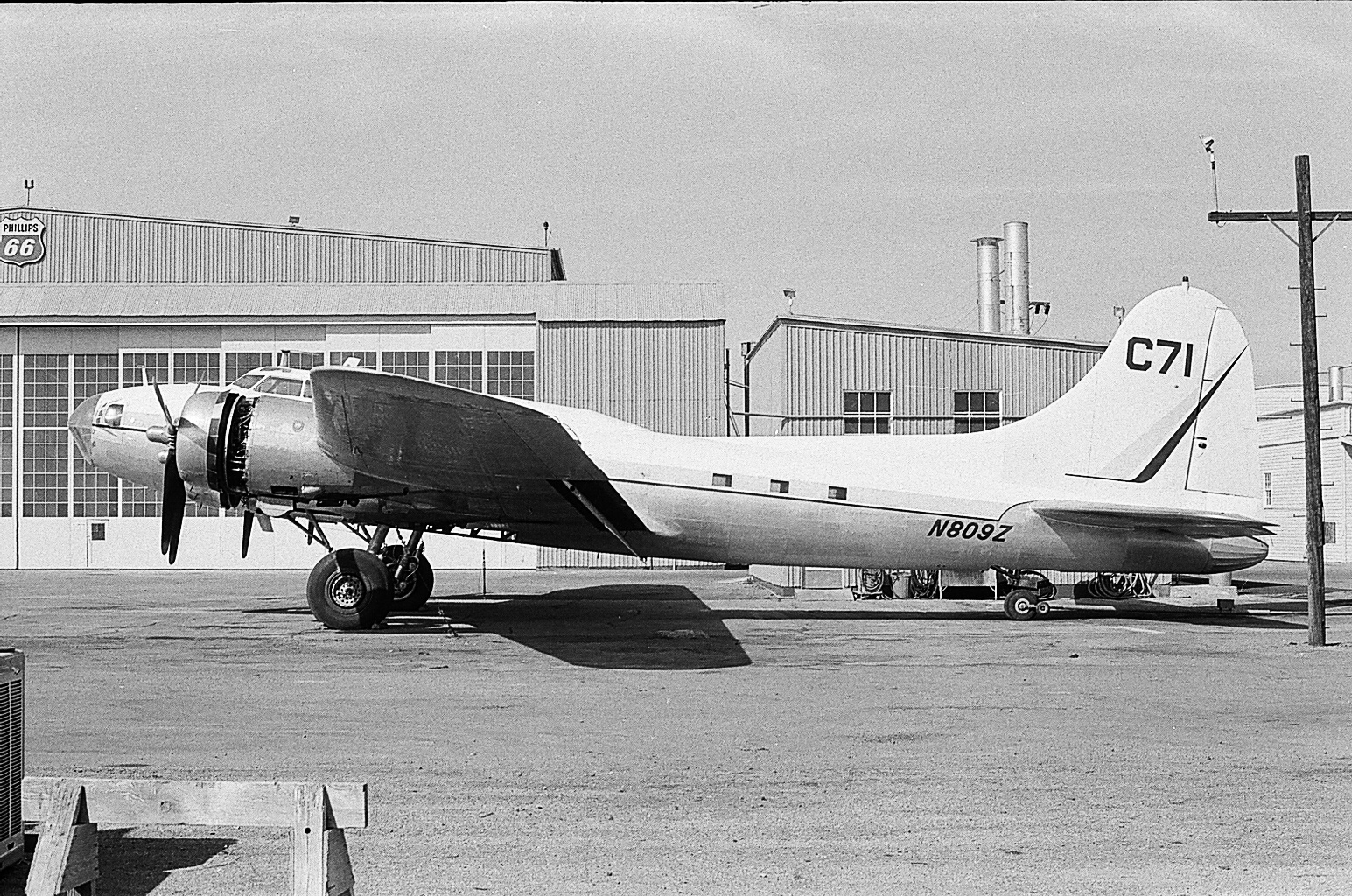
The B-17G N809Z which had been used in the project.

The project was put on hold as formal clearance had arrived too late and NP 9 had drifted too far away. News came in March 1962 that another ice station (NP 8) had also been abandoned. This station could be reached from Canadian airfields. As NP 8 also was a more up-to-date facility than NP 9, the project's target was shifted to NP 8.

On 28 May 1962, a converted CIA Boeing B-17 Flying Fortress serial 44-85531, registered as N809Z, piloted by Connie Seigrist and Douglas Price dropped both men by parachute on NP 8. On 1 June, Seigrist and Price returned and a pick-up was made of the Soviet equipment that had been gathered and of both men, using a Fulton Skyhook system installed on the B-17. This mission required the use of three separate extractions: first for the Soviet equipment, then of LeSchack and finally of Smith.

Operation Coldfeet was a success. The mission yielded information on the Soviet Union's Arctic research activities, including evidence of advanced research on acoustical systems to detect under-ice U.S. submarines and efforts to develop Arctic anti-submarine warfare techniques.
