= North Pole-36 =

Former Russian manned Arctic drifting station

Coordinates: 82°13′N 174°20′E

North Pole-36 (Russian: Северный полюс-36, СП-36) was the 36th Russian manned drifting station, primarily used for Arctic research from September 2008 until August 2009.

== History ==
The station was opened on September 7, 2008.

The primary objective of the station was to improve the quality of weather forecasts and to study global processes of climate change. Work was carried out on environment monitoring, and research in the fields of meteorology, oceanology, glaciology, and aerology was carried out.

The expedition consisted of 18 polar explorers, several dogs, and more than 150 tons of cargo. The station-master was Yuri Katraev. NP-36 station settled down on a piece of sea ice that was approximately 6 square kilometres (2.3 mi^{2}) across. At the moment of disembarkation the station was in "the Hollow of submariners" between Wrangel Island and the North Pole. The vessel Akademik Fyodorov carried out the delivery of the expedition to the ice.

The station was removed with the nuclear icebreaker NS Yamal in the Arctic Ocean at the end of August 2009. The evacuation of the station from the drifting ice floe took three days of continuous work. The chief of high-latitude arctic expeditions Vladimir Sokolov supervised the work.

== Gallery ==
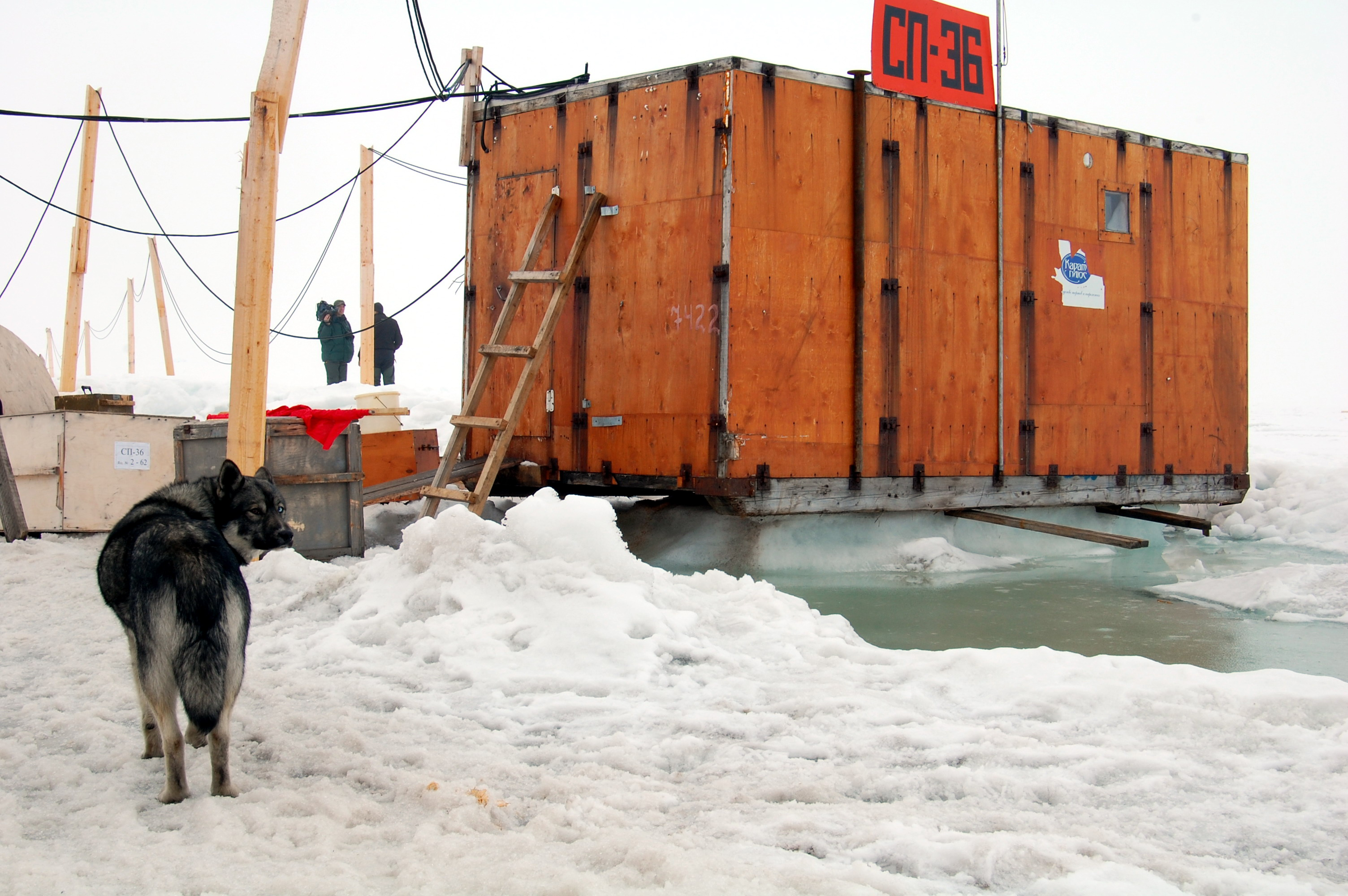
North Pole-36 station

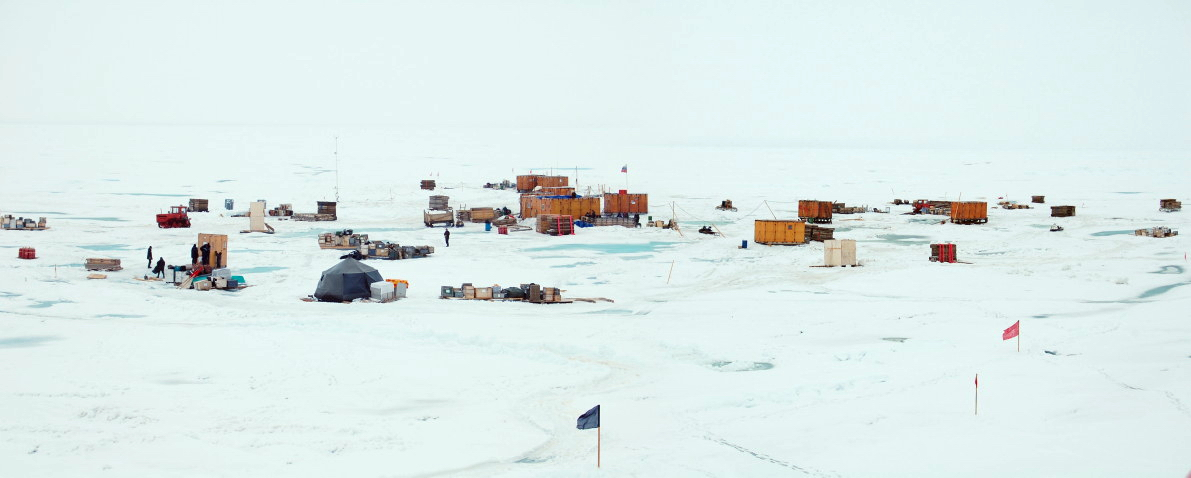
Panoramic view

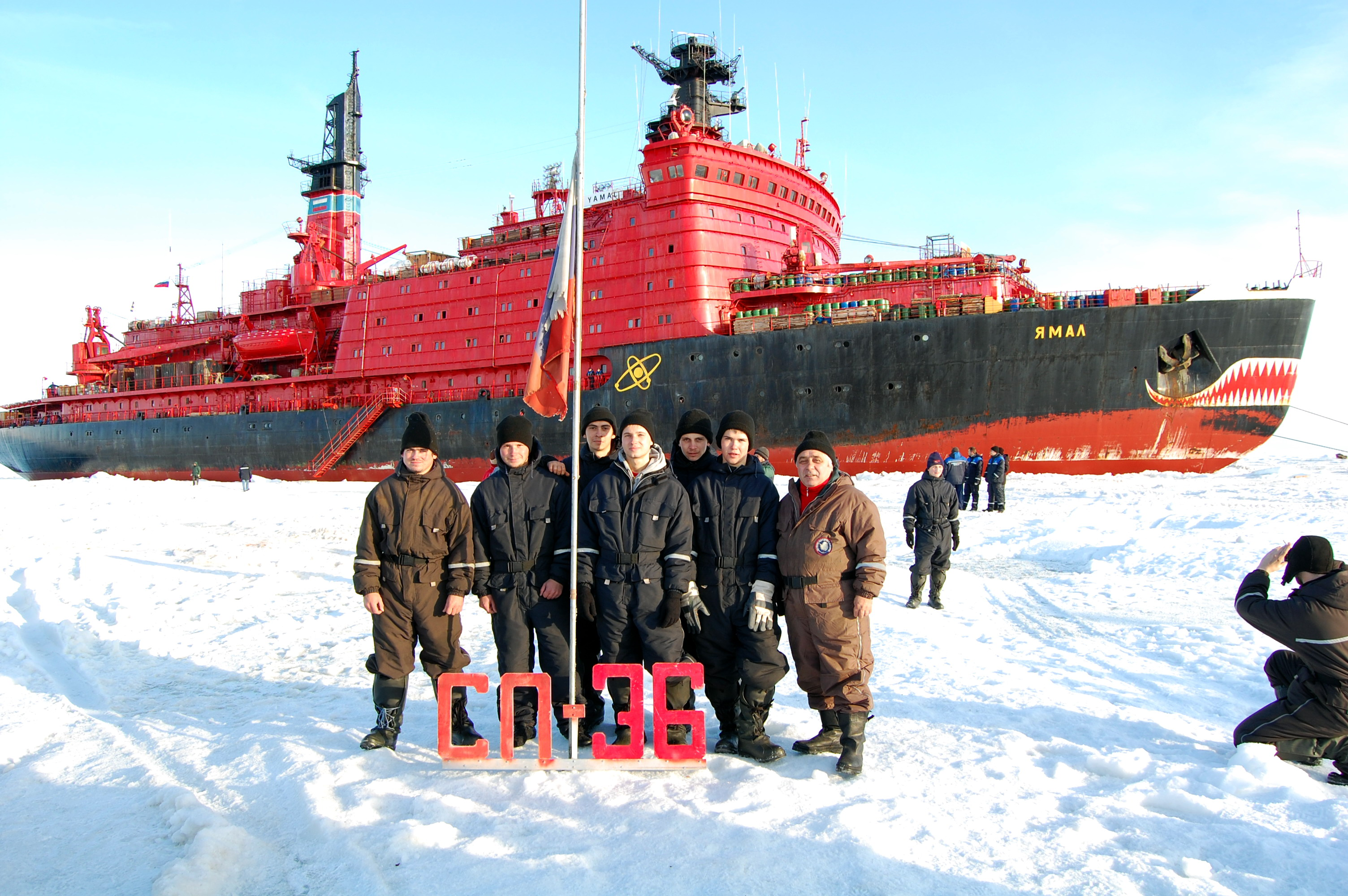
Сoncluding ceremony
