= T-3 case =

US Federal Court of Appeal case

The T-3 case, formally United States v. Escamilla, 467 F.2d 341 (4th Cir. 1972), was a series of legal disputes following a death on the Arctic ice island T-3 in July 1970. In a dispute over some raisin wine, one member of the crew of a research station was alleged to have shot and killed another. Both men were Americans, but the case took place outside U.S. territorial waters, and the case raised a number of questions on the jurisdiction of criminal law in special circumstances. After a trial, appeal, and retrial, the defendant was acquitted.

The matter of jurisdiction was not settled until United States federal law was revised in 1984 by part H of Public Law 98-473.

== Background ==
T-3, also known as Fletcher's Ice Island, was a large iceberg floating in the Arctic Ocean, measuring approximately sixty square kilometres. It was initially occupied by the US Air Force in 1952, and sporadically thereafter; from October 1962 onwards, it had held a permanent research station operated by the Air Force with mostly civilian employees.

On 16 July 1970, a dispute broke out among the station staff over the alleged theft of home-made raisin wine. Mario Escamilla, the owner of the wine, had been told that Donald Leavitt, a co-worker, had entered his accommodation trailer and taken it. He borrowed a rifle and returned to his trailer to confront Leavitt; the camp leader, Benny Lightsey, stopped him and tried to make Escamilla hand over the rifle. In the subsequent dispute, Lightsey was shot and killed. Both Lightsey and Escamilla were US citizens.

== Legal developments ==
After the incident was reported, an investigation team flew to the American Thule Air Base in Greenland and then to T-3. The team was composed of intelligence officers from the US Navy and Coast Guard, and an Assistant US Attorney. They returned with Escamilla, via Thule, to Dulles Airport in Virginia, where he was arrested to stand trial for first degree murder.

Before Escamilla could be tried, a key question was which court had jurisdiction. At the time of the death, T-3 was in pack ice about 240 kilometers north of Ellesmere Island, at 84°45.8′N 106°24.4′W. This placed it within an area considered Canadian territory by the Canadian government, though potentially disputed by other nations. The iceberg itself was thought to have been calved from an ice shelf on Ellesmere Island in Canada, though it had at one point been grounded on the Alaskan coast. No legal precedent covered whether icebergs like this should be treated as islands, as ships, or as an extension of land, and there was recent precedent (1970, Regina v. Tootalik) for a Canadian court upholding jurisdiction over sea ice some distance from solid land.

In the event, the Canadian government had no desire to become involved in the trial, and explicitly waived any jurisdiction they might have had. The Department for External Affairs stated that they wished to avoid any appearance of interfering with a criminal trial in order to resolve a complex point of international law, but that this was without any prejudice to their territorial claims.

This left Escamilla to be tried by an American court. After some discussion, Judge Oren Lewis of the United States District Court for the Eastern District of Virginia allowed the case to proceed to trial, following the prosecution's argument that the case was covered by the "special maritime jurisdiction" of the United States Criminal Code, which extended American jurisdiction to "any vessel belonging ... to the United States". Judge Lewis indicated that in the absence of clear precedent, this was not a definite decision, and he expected the matter to be resolved on appeal.

In the trial, Escamilla's defence argued that he had taken the rifle in the belief that Leavitt was likely to be violent when confronted; that Lightsey was himself acting worryingly when he asked to be given the rifle; and that the rifle was defective and could have gone off accidentally. A weapons expert testified in support of the last point, and the defence called five character witnesses from his home in California to testify to his peaceful and non-violent nature. However, only one was allowed to testify. The defence also argued that the jury should be instructed to consider the special conditions which were present on T-3 – for example, the lack of law enforcement and the absence of lockable doors – and how they might affect what constituted negligent conduct. The judge refused to make such a direction. The jury found Escamilla not guilty of second-degree murder on the high seas, but did find him guilty of the lesser offence of involuntary manslaughter on the high seas. He was sentenced to three years imprisonment, but bailed pending the outcome of an appeal.

The appeal was made on two grounds; the first was the question of jurisdiction, and the second was the argument that there were errors in the conduct of the trial itself. It was taken to the United States Court of Appeals for the Fourth Circuit, which heard the case on 17 August 1970.

The court sat en banc as a panel of six judges, reflecting the complexity of the case. They upheld the appeal and ordered a retrial on the basis that the initial trial should not have restricted the number of character witnesses, and should have directed the jury to consider whether the Arctic conditions would require different standards for determining criminality. However, they divided evenly on the matter of jurisdiction, and so upheld the provisional ruling that an American court was able to try the case.

On retrial, with these new provisions, Escamilla was acquitted of the charges.

== Resolving the jurisdiction question ==
The appeals court did not make a clear ruling on the matter of jurisdiction. This left the question unclear should a similar issue arise in future cases, either in Arctic waters or in Antarctica. Observers noted that the practicality of a trial would have been in severe doubt had Escamilla, Lightsey, or even Leavitt been Canadians – a plausible situation given the degree of international operations – and that any ambiguity in the trial under these circumstances could potentially have caused a major international incident.

The ambiguity was later resolved (at least for the United States) by an amendment to the Federal Criminal Code, which added a provision establishing federal jurisdiction when "...the offense is committed by or against a national of the United States at a place outside the jurisdiction of any nation", intended in part to address these issues. It became law as 18 U.S.C. § 7(7) in 1984.
