= Amundsen-Nobile Climate Change Tower =

Research tower in Svalbard, Norway

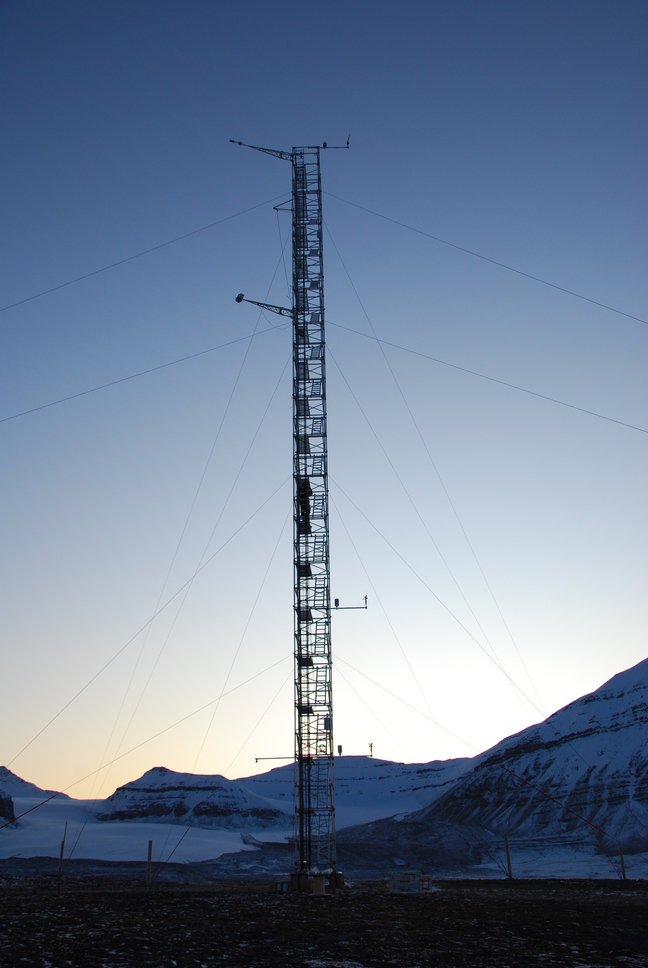
- Interactive map of the Amundsen-Nobile Climate Change Tower area

General information
- Location: Ny-Ålesund, Norway
- Coordinates: 78.921367°N 11.865867°E
- Inaugurated: 30 April 2009

Height
- Height: 34 m (112 ft)

Website
- www.isac.cnr.it/~radiclim/CCTower/?Home

The Amundsen-Nobile Climate Change Tower (CCT) is a 34-meter high research tower installed in Ny-Ålesund, Svalbard, Norway, to study several physical parameters at the atmospheric boundary layer of the lower troposphere.

In particular, it continuously measures meteorological parameters (temperature, relative humidity, intensity and direction of the wind) at four different heights, and the four components of solar and infrared radiations at the top of the tower itself.

It also measures the thickness of the snow layer and its temperature at two different depths.

The tower was funded by the Department of Earth and Environment (DTA) of the National Research Council of Italy (CNR) and installed by the Kings Bay company in the scientific research village of Ny-Ålesund on Svalbard island. The inauguration took place on 30 April 2009.

The CCT is an important landmark for the study of the surface energy balance and the interaction and exchange processes between the various components of the climate system.

The structure is dedicated to the Arctic expeditions of Norwegian Roald Amundsen and Italian Umberto Nobile explorers.

== See also ==
- Dirigibile Italia Arctic Station
- National Research Council (Italy)
- Ny-Ålesund
