= Dirigibile Italia Arctic Station =

Airship Italia Arctic station Base artica Dirigibile Italia
- Research Station
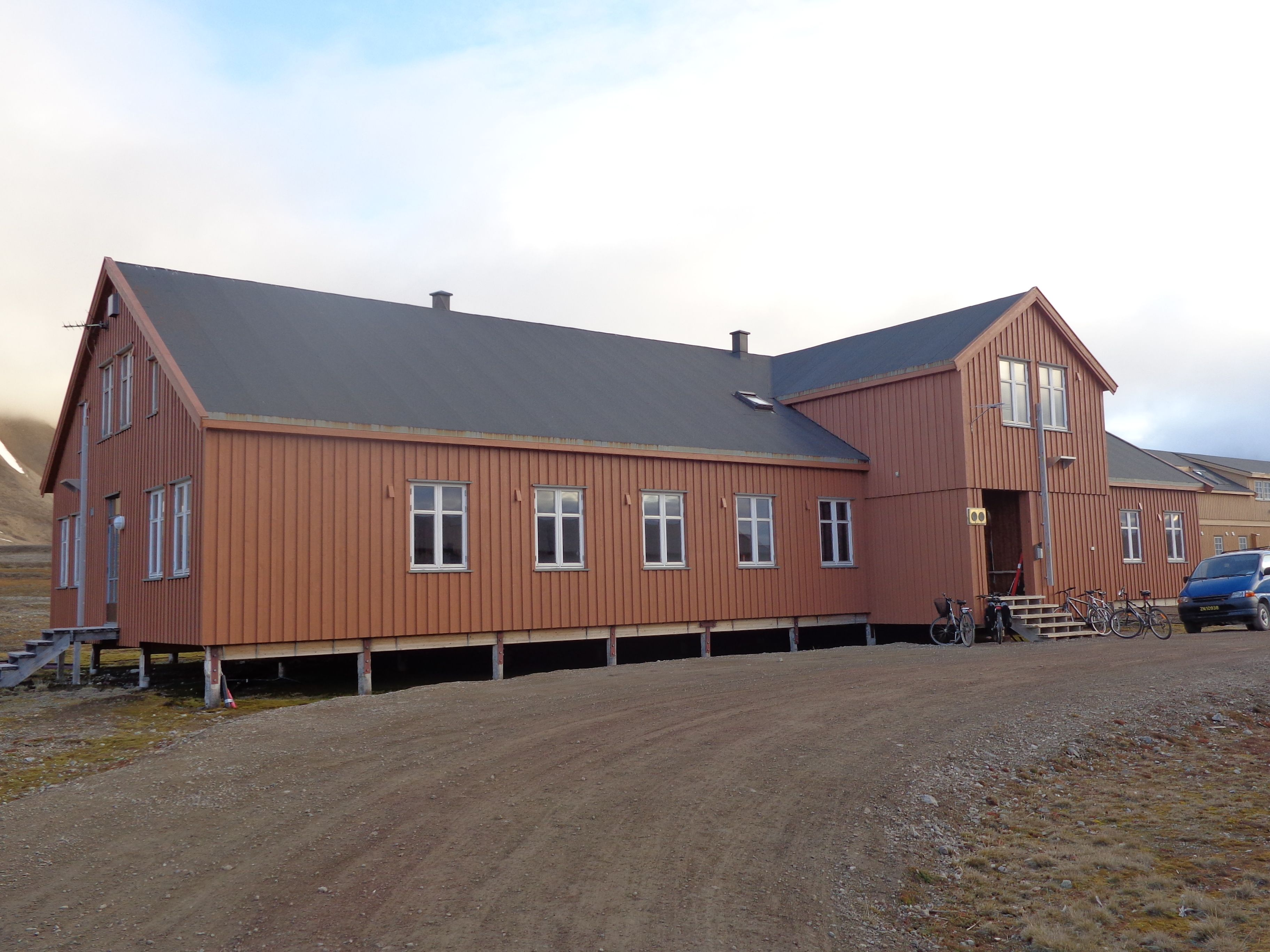
- Airship Italia Arctic station in 2012

- Location within Arctic
- Coordinates: 78°55′N 11°56′E
- Country: Italy
- Established: May 1997
- Named for: Airship Italia

Government
  - Type: Polar Research Organisation
  - Body: National Research Council of Italy

The Dirigibile Italia Arctic station (in Italian: Base artica Dirigibile Italia) is an Italian research station in Ny-Ålesund, Svalbard, Norway.

Managed by the National Research Council of Italy (CNR), the multidisciplinary station was inaugurated in May 1997, in memory of the airship Italia expedition of Umberto Nobile (1928).

It is a 330 m^{2} (3,600 sq ft) permanent research station with laboratories and offices which can host up to seven people, but it is inhabited only in case of ongoing scientific activities. Studies coordinated by CNR focus on the intricate climatic interactions among the atmosphere, the hydrosphere, the biosphere, the lithosphere, and the cryosphere.

The research station also runs the Amundsen-Nobile Climate Change Tower, measuring atmospheric parameters, installed by the Kings Bay and inaugurated on 30 April 2009.

The station participates in the European pan-Arctic INTERACT programm, making its spaces and means available to countries that do not have access to the Arctic and is member of Forum of Arctic Operators FARO.

== See also ==
- List of research stations in the Arctic
