= North Pole-2 =

Soviet drifting ice station

North Pole-2 (Russian: Северный полюс-2) was a Soviet drifting ice station. It was established on April 2, 1950 and drifted for about a year between the Bering Strait and the North Pole. It was closed on April 11, 1951, after the piece of ice it was based on broke into two. The commander of the station was Mikhail Somov, who was made the Hero of the Soviet Union for his role in the expedition.

North Pole-2 became the first Soviet staffed drifting station after North Pole-1 launched in 1937, and established a series of polar expeditions.

The station was staffed by 17 people, and was equipped by ten tents and a truck. Supplies were transported by cargo planes on a regular basis.

The information on the launch and the drift of the station were classified and the details did not appear in the media until the 1990s. The station carried out Arctic research, including depth measurements and studying chemical and biological properties of Arctic sea water. However, apparently, the information was classified because the station was launched in the beginning of the Cold War, when the possibility of Arctic bases of strategic aviation was considered by both the United States and the USSR. In particular, the station investigated the possibility of the creation of such a base on floating ice with the support of cargo planes.
