= Akademik Fedorov =

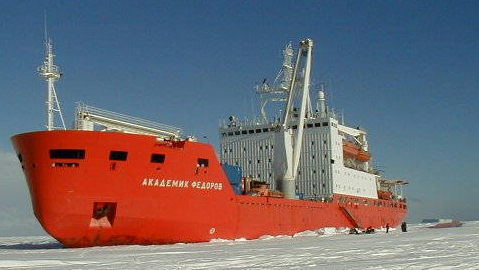

History

Russia
- Name: Akademik Fedorov
- Owner: AARI
- Port of registry: Saint Petersburg, Russia
- Builder: Rauma-Repola, Rauma, Finland
- Launched: 8 September 1987
- Maiden voyage: 24 October 1987
- Identification: IMO number: 8519837
- Status: In service

General characteristics
- Tonnage: 12,660 GT
- Displacement: 16,200 t
- Length: 141.2 metres
- Beam: 23.5 metres
- Draft: 8.5 metres
- Speed: 16 knots (30 km/h; 18 mph)
- Capacity: 172 passengers
- Crew: 80

RV Akademik Fedorov (Russian: Академик Фёдоров) is a Russian scientific diesel-electric research vessel, the flagship of the Russian polar research fleet. It was built in Rauma, Finland for the Soviet Union and completed on 8 September 1987. It started operations on 24 October 1987, in the USSR. The ship was named after a Soviet polar explorer, academician of the USSR Academy of Sciences Evgeny Fyodorov, who worked on the first Soviet crewed drifting ice station North Pole-1.

Research vessel Akademik Fedorov participated in MOSAiC Expedition in 2019-2020 supporting and resupplying the main research icebreaker Polarstern, and also held a six-week course for 20 students for MOSAiC School 2019.

== 2007 Russian North Pole expedition ==
Akademik Fedorov made news on 1 August 2007, when it sailed in the path of an icebreaker on the way to the North Pole as part of Russia's efforts to lay claim to the sea bed beneath the North Pole.

On 2 August 2007, Akademik Fedorov sailed with 100 scientists and researchers and two deep sea mini-submarines to the North Pole where the scientists were dispatched to a depth of more than 13,200 feet (4,000 m) where they dropped a titanium capsule containing a Russian flag.

While the dropping of the flag was a symbolic gesture reminiscent of the United States of America's planting of an American flag on the surface of the Moon, the act does not guarantee Russian rights to extract oil and gas from the sea bed.

Accordingly, scientists aboard Akademik Fedorov were searching for evidence that a 1,240-mile (2,000 km) underwater mountain range, the Lomonosov Ridge, which extends through the north polar region, is actually a geologic extension of Russia, thus allowing Russia to lay claim to the region under the United Nations Convention on the Law of the Sea.

Denmark contends that the Lomonosov Ridge is a geologic extension of Greenland, a Danish territory, whereas Canada claims it is an extension of Ellesmere Island. The Danish and Canadian governments are expected to put forth their own scientific efforts to show that the Lomonosov Ridge is not part of Russia.

Both the United States and Canada also maintain oil and gas rights within the region.

== See also ==
- Akademik Federov Canyon
