= North Pole-37 =

37th Russian manned drifting station

North Pole-37 (Russian: Северный полюс-37, СП-37) was the 37th Russian manned drifting station, primarily used for polar research.

The station was established with the nuclear icebreaker NS Yamal in the Arctic Ocean at the beginning of September 2009. The chief of high-latitude arctic expeditions Vladimir Sokolov supervised the research activity of the station.

On 6 June 2010 the station was closed down early because the floe the station was established on started drifting towards Canadian shores rather than in the direction of Fram Strait as planned. During the period of its operation, the station covered a distance of approximately 2,000 km (1,200 mi).
