= Drifting ice station =

Research stations built on the ice of the high latitudes of the Arctic Ocean

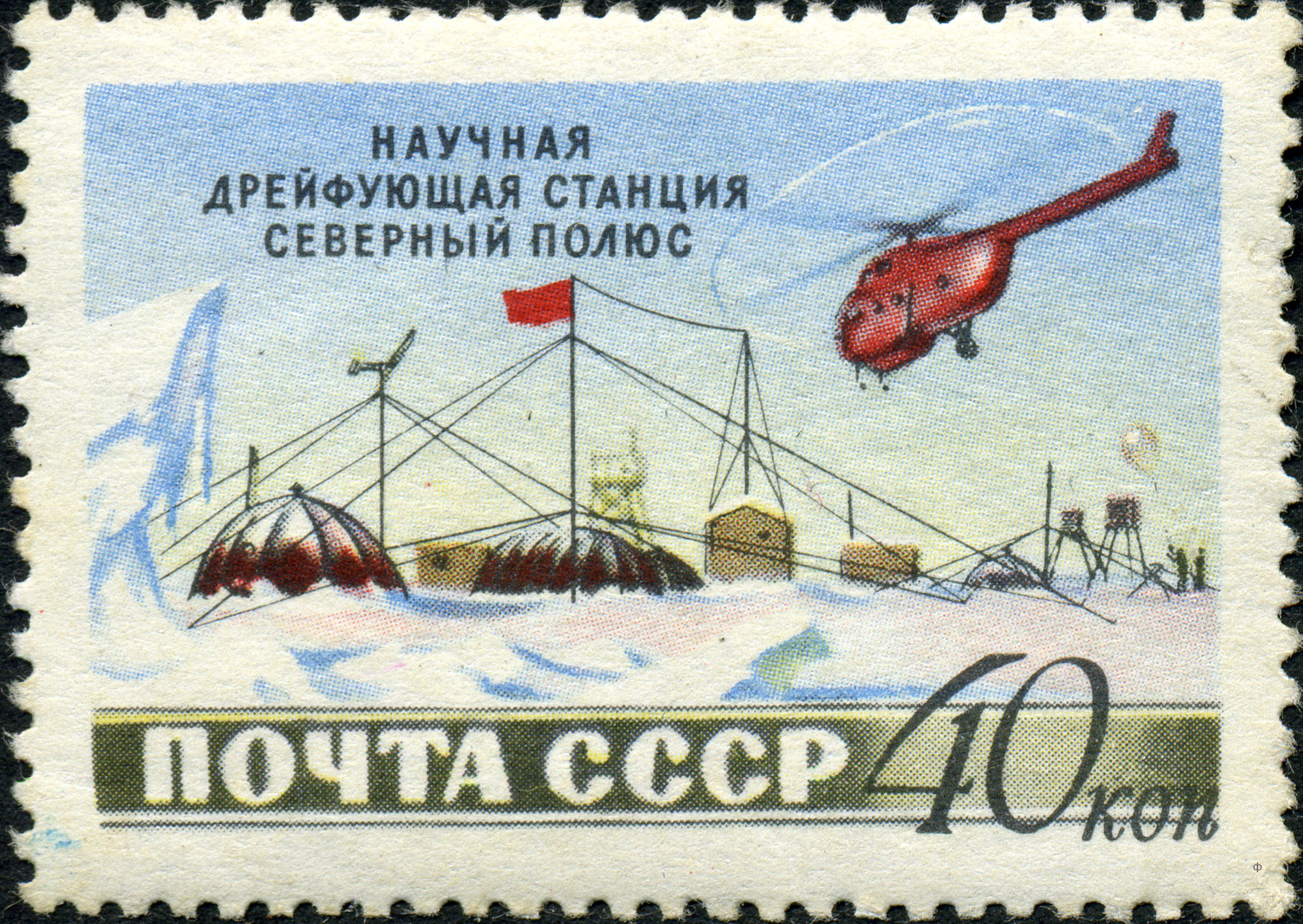
Soviet drifting ice station depicted on a 1955 stamp.

A drifting ice station is a temporary or semi-permanent facility built on an ice floe. During the Cold War the Soviet Union and the United States maintained a number of stations in the Arctic Ocean on floes such as Fletcher's Ice Island for research and espionage, the latter of which were often little more than quickly constructed shacks. Extracting personnel from these stations proved difficult and in the case of the United States, employed early versions of the Fulton surface-to-air recovery system.

== Overview ==
Soviet and Russian-staffed drifting ice stations are research stations built on the ice of the high latitudes of the Arctic Ocean. They are important contributors to exploration of the Arctic. The stations are named "North Pole" (NP; Russian: Северный полюс, romanized: Severny polyus, СП), followed by an ordinal number: North Pole-1, etc. NP drift stations carry out the program of complex year-round research in the fields of oceanology, ice studies, meteorology, aerology, geophysics, hydrochemistry, hydrophysics, and marine biology. On average, an NP station is the host for 600 to 650 ocean depth measurements, 3500 to 3900 complex meteorology measurements, 1200 to 1300 temperature measurements and sea water probes for chemical analysis, and 600 to 650 research balloon launches. Magnetic, ionosphere, ice and other observations are also carried out there. Regular measurements of the ice floe coordinates provide the data on the direction and speed of its drift.

The modern NP drifting ice station resembles a small settlement with housing for polar explorers and special buildings for the scientific equipment. Usually an NP station begins operations in April and continues for two or three years until the ice floe reaches the Greenland Sea. Polar explorers are replaced yearly. Since 1937 some 800 people were drifting at NP stations.

There are two groups of NP stations:

- stations, drifting on the pack ice (i.e. relatively thin and short-lived ice): NP-1 through NP-5, NP-7 through NP-17, NP-20, NP-21
- stations, drifting on ice islands (glacier fragments, that were split from the shore): NP-6, NP-18, NP-19, NP-22.

All NP stations are organized by the Russian (former Soviet) Arctic and Antarctic Research Institute (AARI).

== History ==
The idea to use the drift ice for the exploration of nature in the high latitudes of the Arctic Ocean came from Fridtjof Nansen, who fulfilled it on Fram between 1893 and 1896. The first stations to use drift ice as means of scientific exploration of the Arctic originated in the Soviet Union in 1937, when the first such station in the world, North Pole-1, started operations.

North Pole-1 was established on 21 May 1937 some 20 km from the North Pole by the expedition into the high latitudes. Sever-1, led by Otto Schmidt. "NP-1" operated for 9 months, during which the ice floe travelled 2,850 kilometres. On 19 February 1938, Soviet ice breakers Taimyr and Murman took off four polar explorers from the station, who immediately became famous in the USSR and were awarded titles Hero of the Soviet Union: hydrobiologist Pyotr Shirshov, geophysicist Yevgeny Fyodorov, radioman Ernst Krenkel and their leader Ivan Papanin.

Since 1954 Soviet NP stations worked continuously, with one to three such stations operating simultaneously each year. The total distance drifted between 1937 and 1973 was over 80,000 kilometres. North Pole-22 is particularly notable for its record drift, lasting nine years. On 28 June 1972 the ice floe with North Pole-19 passed over the North Pole for the first time ever.

During such long-term observations by NP stations numerous important discoveries in physical geography were made such as valuable conclusions on regularities and the connection between processes in the polar region of the Earth's hydrosphere and atmosphere and the deep water Lomonosov Ridge, which crosses the Arctic Ocean, other large features of the ocean bottom's relief, the discovery of two systems of the drift (circular and "wash-out"), and the fact of cyclones' active penetration into the Central Arctic.

The last Soviet NP station, North Pole-31, was closed in July 1991.

In the post-Soviet era, Russian exploration of the Arctic by drifting ice stations was suspended for twelve years. The year 2003 was notable for Russia's return into the Arctic. As of 2006, three NP stations had carried out scientific measurements and research since then: "NP-32" through "NP-34". The latter was closed on 25 May 2006.

"NP-35" started operations on 21 September 2007 at the point 81°26′N 103°30′E, when flags of Russia and Saint Petersburg were raised there. 22 scientists, led by A.A.Visnevsky are working on the ice floe. Establishment of the station was the third stage of the Arktika 2007 expedition. An appropriate ice floe was searched for from Akademik Fedorov research vessel, accompanied by nuclear icebreaker Rossiya, using MI-8 helicopters, for a week, until an ice floe with an area of 16 square kilometres was found. The ice has since shrunk significantly, however, and the station is now being abandoned ahead of schedule.

== Replacement ==
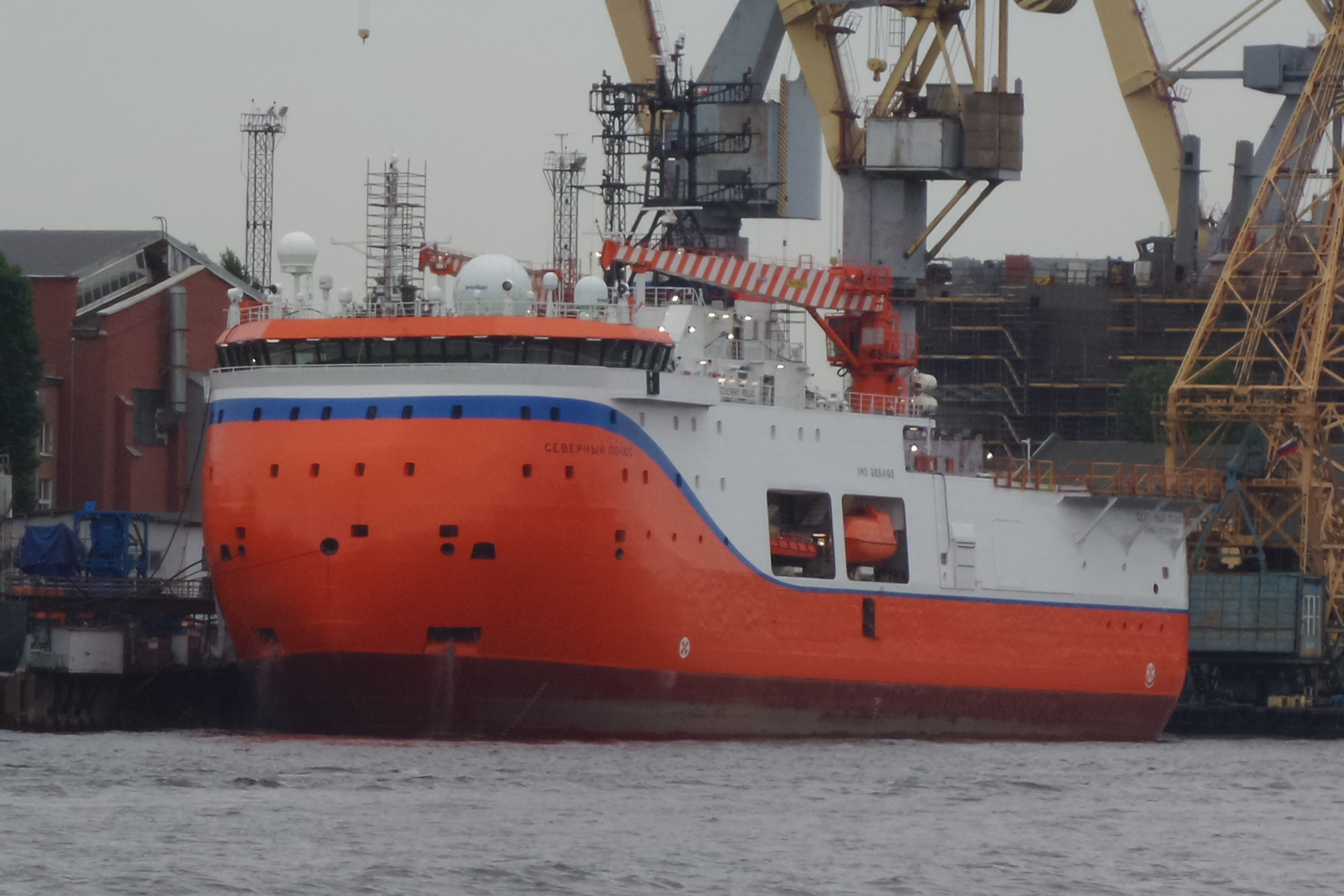
"North Pole" platform at the outfitting pier of the Admiralty Shipyards, St. Petersburg, July 2022

Since the mid-2000s it became difficult to find a suitable ice floe to station camp on, due to global warming, and several stations had to be evacuated prematurely because of unexpectedly fast thawing of the ice, so in 2008 an idea to replace the ice camps with a drifting research vessel as a station core was proposed. After almost a decade of deliberation, a contract of building the station vessel was awarded to Admiralty Shipyard in Saint Petersburg in 2017. This will take a form of a large self-propelled ice resistant barge of ~10000 tons displacement, getting to the initial point of the mission by itself or with a help of an icebreaker and continuing to drift with the surrounding ice. The ice-resistant self-propelled platform "North Pole", intended to function autonomously for 2–3 years, but equipped to be supplied by air or passing icebreakers, and equipped with the required research equipment, was completed in August 2022. The platform completed the drifting station NP-41 in 2022–2024 and started NP–42 in 2024.

== Past stations ==
Station name	Head of the first shift	Drift dates		Drift coordinates		Distance (km)
Station name	Head of the first shift	Began	Ended	Start	Finish	Distance (km)
North Pole-1	I.D. Papanin	May 21, 1937	February 19, 1938	89°25′N 78°40′W	70°40′N 19°16′W	2,850
North Pole-2	M.M. Somov	April 2, 1950	April 11, 1951	76°03′N 166°36′W	81°44′N 163°48′W	2,600
North Pole-3	A.F. Trioshnikov	April 4, 1954	April 20, 1955	85°58′N 175°00′W	86°00′N 24°00′W	1,865
North Pole-4	E.I. Tolstikov	April 8, 1954	April 19, 1957	75°48′N 178°25′W	85°52′N 00°00′W	6,970
North Pole-5	N.A. Volkov	April 21, 1955	October 8, 1956	82°10′N 156°51′E	84°18′N 63°20′E	3,630
Weddell 1		April 12, 1957	December 1, 1957	71°36′S 49°45′W	65°38′S 52°25′W	750
North Pole-6	K.A. Sychev	April 19, 1956	September 14, 1959	74°24′N 177°04′W	82°06′N 03°56′E	8,650
North Pole-7	V.A. Vedernikov	April 23, 1957	April 11, 1959	82°06′N 164°11′W	85°14′N 33°03′W	3,520
North Pole-8	V.M. Rogachyov	April 27, 1959	March 19, 1962	76°11′N 164°24′W	83°15′N 132°30′W	6,090
North Pole-9	V.A. Shamontyev	April 26, 1960	March 28, 1961	77°23′N 163°00′E	86°36′N 76°00′W	2,660
North Pole-10	N.A. Kornilov	October 17, 1961	April 29, 1964	75°27′N 177°10′E	88°32′N 90°30′E	3,960
North Pole-11	N.N. Bryazgin	April 16, 1962	April 20, 1963	77°10′N 165°58′W	81°10′N 139°34′W	2,400
North Pole-12	L.N. Belyakov	April 30, 1963	April 25, 1965	76°50′N 165°34′W	81°06′N 145°47′W	1,595
North Pole-13	A.Ya. Buzuyev	April 22, 1964	April 20, 1967	73°55′N 161°19′W	87°55′N 03°32′E	3,545
North Pole-14	Yu.B. Konstantinov	May 1, 1965	February 12, 1966	72°42′N 175°25′W	76°59′N 154°49′E	1,040
North Pole-15	V.V. Panov	April 15, 1966	March 25, 1968	78°49′N 168°08′E	85°45′N 10°30′W	2,330
North Pole-16	Yu. B. Konstantinov	April 10, 1968	March 22, 1972	75°31′N 172°00′W	86°00′N 85°27′W	5,850
North Pole-17	N.I. Blinov	April 18, 1968	October 16, 1969	80°30′N 165°26′E	86°48′N 25°20′E	1,750
North Pole-18	N.N. Ovchinnikov	October 9, 1969	October 24, 1971	75°10′N 165°02′W	86°06′N 153°51′E	5,240
North Pole-19	A.N. Chilingarov	November 7, 1969	April 16, 1973	74°54′N 160°13′E	83°08′N 16°17′E	6,705
North Pole-20	Yu. P. Tikhonov	April 22, 1970	May 17, 1972	75°56′N 175°22′E	81°44′N 166°47′W	3,780
North Pole-21	G.I. Kizino	April 30, 1972	May 17, 1974	74°06′N 178°15′E	86°16′N 143°35′E	3,605
North Pole-22	V.G. Moroz	September 13, 1973	April 8, 1982	76°16′N 168°31′W	86°10′N 00°00′W	17,069
North Pole-23	V.M. Piguzov	December 5, 1975	November 1, 1978	73°51′N 178°25′W	87°40′N 22°31′W	5,786
North Pole-24	I.K. Popov	June 23, 1978	November 19, 1980	76°45′N 163°00′E	86°03′N 29°40′E	5,652
North Pole-25	V.S. Sidorov	May 16, 1981	April 20, 1984	75°01′N 168°35′E	85°50′N 122°15′W	5,754
North Pole-26	V.S. Sidorov	May 21, 1983	April 9, 1986	78°30′N 174°46′E	82°46′N 170°31′W	5,380
North Pole-27	Yu. P. Tikhonov	June 2, 1984	May 20, 1987	78°31′N 160°30′E	86°28′N 09°02′W	5,655
North Pole-28	A.F. Chernyshov	May 21, 1986	January 23, 1989	80°40′N 168°29′E	79°40′N 03°09′E	7,634
North Pole-29	V.V. Lukin	June 10, 1987	August 19, 1988	80°22.8′N 112°59′E	84°42.8′N 56°34.3′W	2,686
North Pole-30	V.M. Piguzov	October 9, 1987	April 4, 1991	74°18′N 171°24′W	82°31′N 126°26′W	7,675
North Pole-31	V.S. Sidorov	October 22, 1988	July 25, 1991	76°35′N 153°10′W	73°33′N 161°04′W	5,475
North Pole-32	V.S. Koshelev	April 25, 2003	March 6, 2004	87°52.5′N 148°03′E	84°41′N 03°33′W	2,418
North Pole-33	A.A. Visnevsky	September 9, 2004	October 5, 2005	85°05′N 156°31′E	86°14′N 95°54′E	3,156
North Pole-34	T.V. Petrovsky	September 19, 2005	May 25, 2006	85°39′N 115°19′E	87°26′N 07°39′E	2,032
North Pole-35	Vladimir Chupun	September 21, 2007	July 22, 2008	81°30′N 103°54′E	81°00′N 31°18′E	3,614
North Pole-36	Yuri Katrayev	September 7, 2008	August 24, 2009	82°32′N 144°56′E	85°53′N 26°41′W	2,905
North Pole-37	Sergey Lesenkov	September 7, 2009	May 31, 2010	81°28′N 164°35′W	80°04′N 140°40′W	2,076
North Pole-38	Tomash Petrovskiy	October 14, 2010	September 20, 2011	76°07′N 176°32′W	83°53′N 154°18′W	3,024
North Pole-39	Alexander Ipatov	October 2, 2011	September 15, 2012	84°10′N 148°49′W	83°57′N 96°44′W	1,885
North Pole-40	Nikolai Fomichev	October 1, 2012	June 7, 2013	85°21′N 142°53′W	82°25′N 130°25′W	1,736
North Pole-2015	Dmitrij Mamadaliev	April 11, 2015	August 9, 2015	89°34′N 17°08′W	86°15′N 07°52′W	714
North Pole-41	Kirill Filchuk	October 02, 2022	March 3, 2024	82°37′N 155°31′W	83°12′N 30°00′W	2700
North Pole-42	Aleksander Ipatov	September 30, 2024		81°15′N 141°15′W		

== See also ==
- List of research stations in the Arctic
- List of Russian explorers
- Soviet Antarctic Expedition
- Barneo, one-month tourist ice camp annual since 2002
- Icebreaker Sedov
- Konstantin Badygin
- Project Coldfeet
- Ice Station Zebra
