= Fletcher's Ice Island =

Iceberg used as scientific drift station

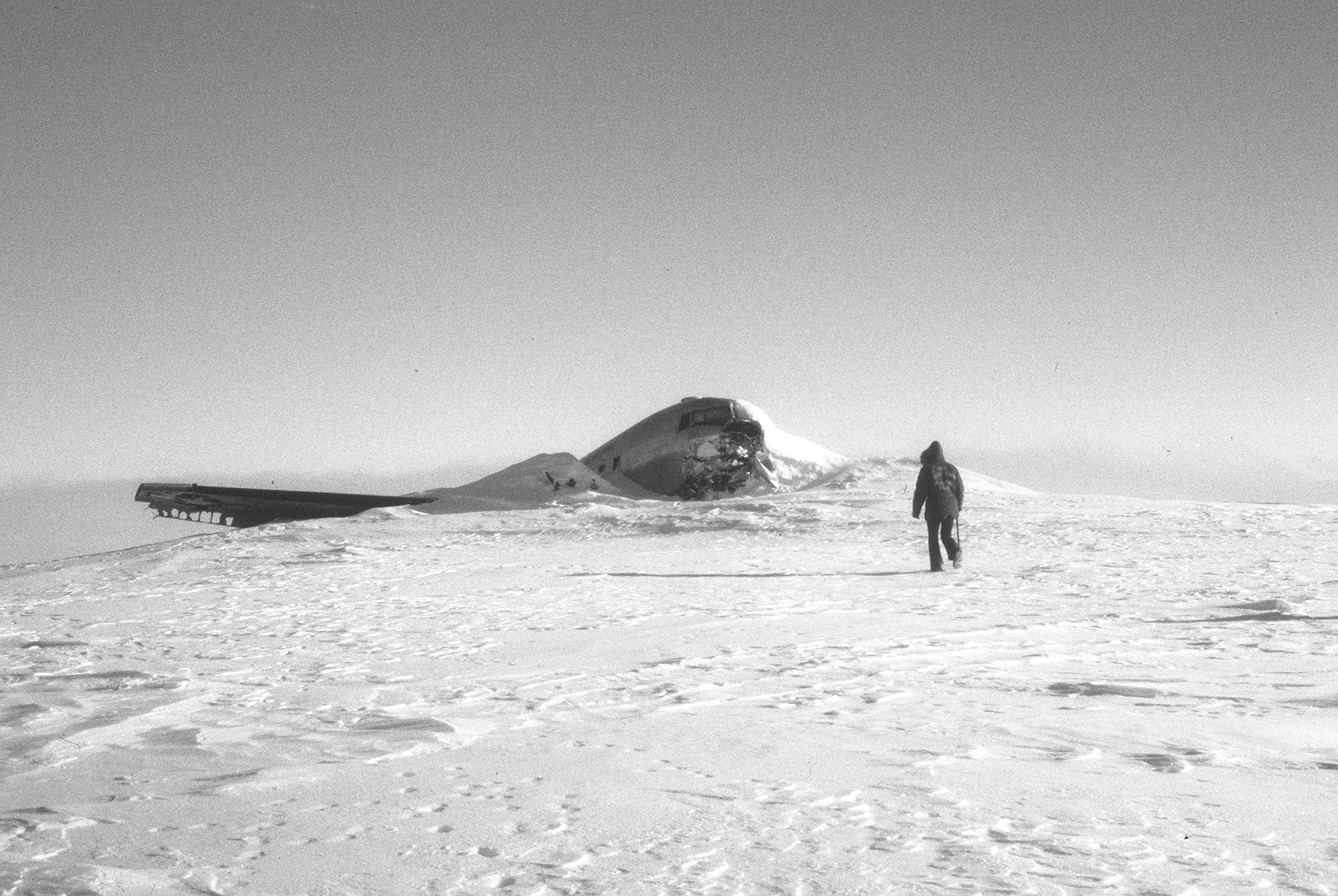
Wrecked USAF C-47 aircraft on Fletcher's Ice Island (photo taken in June 1972)

Fletcher's Ice Island or T-3 was an iceberg discovered by U.S. Air Force Colonel Joseph O. Fletcher. Between 1952 and 1978 it was used as a staffed scientific drift station that included huts, a power plant, and a runway for wheeled aircraft. The iceberg was a thick tabular sheet of glacial ice that drifted throughout the central Arctic Ocean in a clockwise direction. First inhabited in 1952 as an arctic weather report station, it was abandoned in 1954 but reinhabited on two subsequent occasions. The station was inhabited mainly by scientists along with a few military crewmen and was resupplied during its existence primarily by military planes operating from Utqiagvik, Alaska. The iceberg was later occupied by the Naval Arctic Research Laboratory, and served as a base of operations for the Navy's arctic research projects such as sea bottom and ocean swell studies, seismographic activities, meteorological studies and other classified projects under the direction of the Department of Defense. Before the era of satellites, the research station on T-3 had been a valuable site for measurements of the atmosphere in the Arctic.

== Overview ==
Produced by the northern coast of Ellesmere Island, the iceberg T-3 was a very large tabular iceberg. This 7 miles (11 km) by 3 miles (4.8 km) kidney-shaped iceberg was discovered near the North Pole by researchers studying the Arctic haze during the spring and summer. Although the thickness of the iceberg was 125 feet and it weighed over seven billion tons, it rose only ten feet above the surrounding ice packs and was virtually indistinguishable from the pack ice at any distance.

The temporary drift station consisting of insulated huts was first assembled by the U.S. Military. By the end of May, 1957, a 1500-meter-long runway and most of the station's 26 Jamesway huts had been completed, allowing the commencement of scientific operations. Beginning in 1952 scientists including Albert P. Crary arrived and performed numerous scientific investigations including hydrographic measurements, seismic soundings, and meteorological observations. In general, 25- to 30-person military crews and scientists staffed the camp at any one time.

The resupply was mostly operated during the winter period while the runway was suitable for aircraft landing. This also indicated operating during the most severe weather conditions, such as very low ceilings and prevailing reduced visibility. Accurate weather forecasting was not available until much later, due to the absence of reporting stations and the distance to travel over remote arctic wastes. Winds in excess of 45 knots and temperatures below minus 30°F (-34°C) had also been recorded at both stations during resupply operations. Resupply for T-3 was hampered by a mix of varying obstacles. Due to the iceberg's constantly moving location, resupply had to be operated from two air bases Point Barrow, Alaska and Thule Air Base, Greenland. At that time, flights were conducted without navigational aids, and the aircraft landing on the constantly moving iceberg T-3 was performed solely by dead reckoning and celestial grid navigation, which was often hampered by long periods of twilight, which prevented celestial observation. Also, because the nearest alternate air bases were 475 miles (764 km) away, potential in-flight emergencies could result in fatal outcomes. In this regard, pilots and their crews had to calculate cargo and fuel loads precisely to ensure not only a safe landing but also a safe return from the iceberg.

== History ==
Iceberg T-3 had once been reported to have been identified during World War II, but there are several conflicting reports in regard to when the iceberg was actually "discovered". Concerned about Soviet postwar activities in the Arctic, the U.S. Air Force initiated B-29 reconnaissance flights over the Arctic region beginning in 1946, and, by 1951, the reconnaissance trips to the North Pole were being performed daily. During the reconnaissance flights, several large icebergs were discovered, and the following year of 1952, the Alaska Air Command started a project in order to establish a weather station on one of the icebergs and conduct geophysical and oceanographic research. Joseph O. Fletcher, who was the Commanding Officer of a U.S. Air Force weather squadron stationed in the Arctic right after the World War II, was placed in charge of the entire project.

In March 1952, Thule Air Base sent C-47 aircraft to T-3, and several research stations were installed on the iceberg's flat surface. The stations were abandoned in May 1954, when the weather observations were deemed redundant, but were reoccupied from April to September 1955. In April 1957, the station "ALPHA" was installed on the iceberg, which was the first long-term scientific base in the Arctic operated by a Western country. However, at the time of its establishment, the Soviets had already operated six drifting iceberg stations of this kind.

In April 1958, several large cracks were observed around ALPHA, and the station was forced to relocate 2 km away from its original location. In August 1958, after the US Submarine USS Skate (SSN-578) made a visit to the station ALPHA, the surrounding ice ground began cracking and ridging again, so the station was finally abandoned in November 1958. However, the U.S. Department of Defense still had interest in continuing research in the Arctic. In April 1959, another scientific station named "CHARLIE" (also named as ALPHA II) was established by the Alaska Air Command with assistance from the Navy's Arctic Research Laboratory. Scientific research activity was conducted from June 1959 to January 1960. When the ice floe cracked and shortened the runway sufficiently to terminate aircraft resupply operations, station CHARLIE had to be evacuated.

Meanwhile, on 7 March 1957, using several 42-foot-long (13 m) commercial house trailers, the Northeast Air Command established a station called "BRAVO" on the iceberg. The reoccupied T-3 continued to drift off the northern Canadian coastline, eventually arriving in Alaskan waters by July 1959, where air support responsibilities were transferred to Alaskan bases. In May 1960, the ice island drifted aground at near Wainwright, Alaska, terminating several geophysical research programs. The following year in October, the station was abandoned again, but the site was left intact for possible future use. As U.S. Navy was still eager to continue Arctic based operations, the Arctic Research Laboratory planned to install a new station to replace the former station CHARLIE. However, this intention was balked at the costs required to charter a C-47 for the installation. Instead, following September an icebreaker USS Burton Island (AGB-1) was employed to transport the equipment, and the Arctic Research Laboratory Ice Station I (known as ARLIS I) was constructed in under 40 hours. Although ARLIS I was designed to support eight scientists and four technical personnel, the station never achieved its full potential. As the iceberg drifted westward, small aircraft (Cessna 180) were employed to resupply the station. However, upon approaching the range limit of these aircraft, the station was evacuated in March 1961.

A more permanent drifting ice station was desired for the second Arctic Research Laboratory Ice Station (ARLIS II), but with T-3 grounded, a tentative site on an ice floe was selected. However, during its deployment in May 1961 the ice ground began breaking up on a large scale, and the Navy found another 3.5 miles (5.6 km) by 1.5 miles (2.4 km) iceberg north of Point Barrow. In next 22 days, using a C-47 Skytrain, all of the equipment to outfit the 14 prefabricated buildings was transported to the newly discovered iceberg. Scientific operations restarted on 23 May 1961 and continued all the way into 11 May 1965. Resupply of ARLIS II during the first year was carried out by airdrops from large aircraft such as Lockheed Model 18 Lodestar and C-47 Skytrains, and also by the icebreaker USCGC Staten Island (WAGB-278) twice in the summer.

Between 1962 and 1964, as the iceberg drifted farther north, away from Barrow and across the Arctic Ocean, resupply from Alaska became difficult. While station ARLIS II was drifting away from Barrow, the iceberg T-3 was rediscovered in February 1962 over 100 miles (160 km) north of where it had been previously observed. The Arctic Research Laboratory reoccupied the iceberg, refurbished the abandoned buildings, and re-established the station which previously served as a second drifting station and a fuel depot for the flights to the station ARLIS II. In December 1963, the station ARLIS II reached the most northern point of its journey and eventually drifted out through the Fram Strait with the East Greenland Current. During this period, re-supply operations were performed by Keflavik Naval Air Station in Iceland.

After 47 months and 18 days of continuous operation, ARLIS II was evacuated in May 1965 by the icebreaker USCGC Edisto (WAGB-284). The station hosted 14 different research projects, including 337 personnel. Upon completion of major restoration of ARLIS II, a full occupation of T-3 by the Arctic Research Laboratory was initiated in September 1965. And by this time, the iceberg had completely circled the Beaufort Gyre. Meanwhile, while the ARLIS II and T-3 ice stations were occupied, the Arctic Research Laboratory established two temporary drift stations northeast of Barrow, primarily for scientific studies of telluric currents, geomagnetic variation, micropulsations, and aurora. ARLIS III was established on 10 February 1964 and was evacuated on 16 May 1964, while ARLIS IV operated between February and May 1965. The last attempt to resupply T-3 occurred during the Bering Sea Patrol of September to November 1967: participating ships were USCGC Glacier, CCGS John A. Macdonald, USCGC Staten Island and USCGC Northwind. The station remained active until 1 Oct 1974, and it was last visited in 1979. After being satellite-monitored for years, the iceberg eventually drifted through the Fram Strait in 1983.

=== Rebuilding a wrecked Hercules aircraft in 1973 ===
In 1973, Alaska International Air, an Alaskan freight airline, contracted to resupply Fletcher's Ice Island with Lockheed L-100 Hercules aircraft. One such flight landed on the runway in February 1973 only to hit ice ridges (not visible from the air), which caused severe damage to the aircraft, including ripping off its wings. The aircraft was deemed a write-off. The airline bought back the wreckage from the insurance company for parts, but its maintenance personnel determined it could be reconstructed, outside, on top of an iceberg, in the middle of the Arctic Ocean. For six months ending November 1973, a team of mechanics rebuilt the aircraft, including replacing the entire wing (a replacement wing was flown in on another Hercules). The top of the iceberg partially melted during the summer, mechanics wore waders in ice-cold water, and during that time, since the runway was out of action, could only be resupplied by air drop. By November, temperatures were down to 40 below, or worse. But at the end of November, the aircraft was flown out in stages back to Alaska, and ultimately returned to service.

== Eventuality ==
Satellite monitoring had been employed to keep track of Iceberg T-3 since it was abandoned, but meteorologists lost track of it in the autumn of 1982. A request was made to the NOAA flight research team to keep an eye out for T-3.

On July 3, 1983, the Associated Press reported US scientists had rediscovered the iceberg after it had been missing for six months. Dave Turner, an experienced NOAA pilot who was one of the last people to observe T-3, reported that the ice floe was found about 150 miles (240 km) from the North Pole. T-3 was easily spotted, as its surface was distinctly decorated by remaining structures of a C-47 aircraft wrecked years before. At the time of discovery, the iceberg was about one-third of its original thickness. It is estimated that sometime after July 1983, the iceberg eventually worked its way to the outside of the Arctic ice pack, where it caught a southern current, drifted off into the Atlantic Ocean, and finally melted away.

== See also ==
- List of research stations in the Arctic
- Alfred Ernest Ice Shelf
- T-3 case, a 1970 death on T-3 and the subsequent trial
