= Zvezda Shipbuilding Complex =

Russian shipbuilding company

Coordinates: 43°7′24.46″N 132°20′24.77″E

"Zvezda" Shipbuilding Complex
- Native name: Судостроительный комплекс «Звезда»
- Type: Limited Liability Company
- Industry: Shipbuilding
- Founded: December 17, 2015; 10 years ago
- Headquarters: Bolshoy Kamen, Russia
- Website: sskzvezda.ru

Zvezda Shipbuilding Complex (Russian: Судостроительный комплекс «Звезда») is a Russian shipbuilding company that operates the country's largest shipyard in the town of Bolshoy Kamen in Primorsky Krai across the bay from Vladivostok. Established in 2015 by a consortium of investors led by the Russian oil company Rosneft, the company has since attracted a large number of orders for oil tankers, LNG carriers and icebreakers.

== Description ==
The main production facilities at Zvezda Shipbuilding Complex, built at and around the site of the old Zvezda Shipyard, include a 485 by 114 metres (1,590 by 370 ft) graving dock and a horizontal slipway served by a 40,000-tonne floating transfer dock capable of launching 300-metre (980 ft) hulls. Both production lines are served by 1200-tonne gantry cranes as well as numerous smaller cranes.

== History ==
Since the 1960s the Zvezda shipyard was used as a base for commissioning of nuclear submarines which were built at Shipyard № 199 in Komsomolsk-on-Amur.

At the end of the Cold War, the Zvezda shipyard was used to decommission Soviet nuclear submarines, with funding and support from the US and Canada under the Nunn–Lugar Cooperative Threat Reduction initiative.

Following the decommissioning work, there were plans to expand and redevelop the shipyard to construct larger new ships. Work on the latest attempt at expansion began in 2009; the Russian government has criticised delays and threatened to hand control of the project to third parties, perhaps including Rosneft and Gazprom. In the longer term, the shipyard may be opened up to foreign investors as part of a broader plan to make the Russian shipbuilding industry capable of competing with shipbuilders in other countries.

When the expansion is complete, the shipyard would be able to build ships up to 360m and 250,000dwt.

In November 2024, it was announced that Rosneft and VTB had begun negotiations on incorporating the Zvezda Shipbuilding Complex into the state-owned United Shipbuilding Corporation (USC). However, in March 2025 it was announced that the merger had been cancelled as the USC did not have the necessary funds.

== Orders ==
Zvezda Shipbuilding Complex received its pilot order on 5 September 2015 when Rosneft ordered two icebreaking platform supply vessels. The contract included options for two additional sister ships which were exercised on 1 September 2016. The vessels are based on IBSV 10022 design developed by Lazurit Central Design Bureau in co-operation with the Dutch shipbuilder Damen Shipyards Group and the construction is managed by Zvezda Marine Technologies, a joint venture between Rosneft and Damen. The keels of all four vessels were laid at the same time on 8 September 2017. The first vessel of the series, Katerina Velikaya, was launched on 15 December 2020 and later towed to Vladivostok for outfitting and trials. The second vessel of the series, Svyataya Mariya, has also been launched. The third and fourth hulls were being built at Damen's Mangalia shipyard in Romania where work has since stopped due to EU sanctions against Russia. Initially scheduled for delivery between June 2019 and April 2020, none of the four ships have been delivered as of August 2026.

On 1 September 2016, Rosneft placed an order for five 114,000 DWT LNG-fuelled Aframax crude oil tankers. Sovcomflot ordered five tankers of the same design on 25 September 2017 and further two on 11 September 2018. As of August 2026, three tankers have been delivered to Rosneft and two to Sovcomflot, and several are under construction. The ship's are based on the Hyundai 114K design developed by the South Korean shipbuilder HD Hyundai Heavy Industries who have delivered several fully-outfitted stern sections built by Hyundai Samho Heavy Industries to Russia for final outfitting and delivery.

On 19 October 2017, Rosneft ordered ten 42,000 DWT icebreaking shuttle tankers to transport oil from the company's Payakhskoye deposit in the Yenisey River delta along the Northern Sea Route. Although scheduled for delivery from September 2023 onwards, none of the Arc7 ice class tankers have commenced construction as of August 2026.

On 24 May 2018, Rosmorport placed an order for the construction of a shallow-draught river icebreaker with an option for three additional vessels. However, Rosmorport cancelled the contract in October 2022, opting to build two such icebreakers on the company's own Onega Shipbuilding and Ship Repair Plant in Petrozavodsk.

On 28 May 2018, Rosneft ordered a 69,000 DWT ice class Arc6 icebreaking shuttle tanker to transport oil from the Trebs and Titov oil fields. The ship, named Valentin Pikul, was laid down on 4 December 2020 and launched on 27 July 2023. The fully-outfitted stern was built by Samsung Heavy Industries in South Korea. Initially scheduled for delivery in 2022, the vessel was completed on 25 December 2024. The contract included an option for a second similar vessel that has not been exercised as of August 2026.

On 8 October 2018, Gazprom Flot placed an order for four offshore vessels — three supply vessels and one crew transport vessel — with deliveries between 2021 and 2024. As of August 2026, all four vessels have been laid down but none have been launched.

On 28 December 2018, Sovcomflot ordered three 50,000 DWT LNG-fuelled product tankers. All three ships, built in co-operation with Hyundai Mipo Dockyard, were laid down in 2021 with deliveries originally scheduled for 2022–2023. The first vessel of the series, Ivan Aivazovsky, was delivered on 25 November 2025. As of August 2026, the other two tankers remain under construction at Zvezda Shipbuilding Complex.

On 10 April 2019, Sovcomflot ordered the first second-generation Yamalmax LNG carrier for the Arctic LNG 2 project. Smart LNG, a joint venture between Sovcomflot and Novatek, made a follow-up order for four more ships in January 2020 and ten more on 7 September 2020, bringing the total number of 174,000 m^{3} ice class Arc7 icebreaking LNG carriers ordered from Zvezda Shipbuilding Complex to 15. The ships are built in co-operation with Samsung Heavy Industries who delivered the first five hulls fully assembled up to the front bulkhead of the cargo tanks from South Korea. However, the international sanctions during the Russian invasion of Ukraine put an end to this co-operation. Furthermore, the French company Gaztransport & Technigaz which provides expertise for the LNG carriers' membrane containment systems has suspended co-operation with the shipyard from the third hull onwards. As of August 2026, two Arc7 LNG carrier ordered from Zvezda Shipbuilding Complex, Aleksey Kosygin and Konstantin Posiet, have been delivered several years behind schedule and three more have been launched. In June 2025, Samsung Heavy Industries formally notified Zvezda Shipbuilding Complex about the termination of the co-operation for the remaining ten ships.

On 20 April 2020, Atomflot placed an order for the world's largest and most powerful nuclear-powered icebreaker with delivery scheduled for 2027. Initially Zvezda Shipbuilding Complex, which had been selected as the sole builder for the 120-megawatt Project 10510 "Leader" icebreakers already in September 2018, was supposed to build three such vessels. However, Russia's updated Arctic strategy provided for only one Project 10510 vessel to be built before 2035, shifting the emphasis to two additional Project 22220 icebreaker. The construction of the icebreaker, named Rossiya, began with steel cutting ceremony on 6 July 2020 and the keel was laid on 5 July 2021. As of August 2026, the construction of the icebreaker is ongoing but the project has suffered from delays, setbacks and budget overruns, and instead of its planned 2027 delivery date the icebreaker is estimated to be commissioned in 2030.

On 22 December 2020, Zvezda Shipbuilding Complex was awarded the construction of two research vessels for the Russian Academy of Sciences with delivery in 2024–2025. Steel cutting began on 4 September 2025 and both ships are under construction as of August 2026.

In September 2021, Zvezda Shipbuilding Complex signed an agreement with LLC Coalstar for the construction of five 86,400 DWT Panamax bulk carriers to transport anthracite mined from the Bogatyr coal mine in Novosibirsk. Steel cutting began in February 2025 and the keels of the first two vessels, Mikhail Yegorov and Meliton Kantaria, were laid on 7 May 2025.

In October 2021, Zvezda Shipbuilding Complex was expected to receive an order for ten 120,000 DWT Arc7 shuttle tankers from Rosneft for the Vostok Oil project. Samsung Heavy Industries, with whom the Russian shipbuilder had established a joint venture to manage the construction of Arctic shuttle tankers in 2019, was contracted to supply design, equipment and partial construction of seven such vessels. However, the shipbuilding contract with Zvezda Shipbuilding Complex was never officially announced and in June 2025 Samsung Heavy Industries terminated co-operation with the Russian shipyard due to international sanctions following the Russian invasion of Ukraine.

As of August 2026, Zvezda Shipbuilding Complex has delivered nineships — five Aframax crude oil tankers built in co-operation with Hyundai Heavy Industries, one Arctic shuttle tanker and two Arctic LNG carriers built in co-operation with Samsung Heavy Industries, and one product tanker built in co-operation with Hyundai Mipo Dockyard — and has at least 23 ships reportedly under construction at the shipyard in Russia.

== List of ships built or on order ==
| Ship name | Ship name (Russian) | Namesake | Owner/operator | Ordered | Keel laid | Launched | Delivered | Size (Note: Size selected to be descriptive for each ship type; for example deadweight tonnage for tankers, gas capacity for LNG carriers, and propulsion power for icebreakers) | Type | Yard number (Note: Yard number of other involved shipyard, if assigned, in parentheses) | IMO number | Status | Notes | Image |
|---|---|---|---|---|---|---|---|---|---|---|---|---|---|---|
| Valentin Pikul | Валентин Пикуль | Valentin Pikul | Rosnefteflot | 28 May 2018 | 4 December 2020 | 27 July 2023 | 25 December 2024 | 69,000 DWT | Shuttle tanker | 022 (2303) | 9885879 | In service | Stern section built by Samsung Heavy Industries in South Korea | |
| Valentin Pochinkin | Валентин Починкин | Valentin Pochinkin | Gazprom Flot | 8 October 2018 | 30 December 2022 | | 2021–2024 (planned) | | Offshore supply vessel | 031 | 1038250 | Keel laid | | |
| | | | Gazprom Flot | 8 October 2018 | 30 May 2023 | | 2021–2024 (planned) | | Offshore supply vessel | 032 | 1038262 | Keel laid | | |
| | | | Gazprom Flot | 8 October 2018 | 31 August 2023 | | 2021–2024 (planned) | | Offshore supply vessel | 033 | 1038274 | Keel laid | | |
| Nikolay Nemchinov | Николай Немчинов | Nikolay Nemchinov | Gazprom Flot | 8 October 2018 | 30 December 2021 | | 2021–2024 (planned) | | Crew transport vessel | 034 | 1038418 | Keel laid | | |
| Ivan Aivazovsky | Иван Айвазовский | Ivan Aivazovsky | Sovcomflot | 28 December 2018 | 30 March 2021 | 29 April 2022 | 25 November 2025 | 50,000 DWT | Product tanker | 036 (1033) | 9876359 | In service | Built in co-operation with Hyundai Mipo Dockyard | |
| Alexey Bogolyubov | Алексей Боголюбов | Alexey Bogolyubov | Sovcomflot | 28 December 2018 | 30 June 2021 | | 2023 (planned) | 50,000 DWT | Product tanker | 037 (1034) | 9876361 | Keel laid | Built in co-operation with Hyundai Mipo Dockyard | |
| Alexander Beggrov | Александр Беггров | Alexander Beggrov | Sovcomflot | 28 December 2018 | 30 August 2021 | 30 September 2022 | 2023 (planned) | 50,000 DWT | Product tanker | 038 (1035) | 9876373 | Launched | Built in co-operation with Hyundai Mipo Dockyard | |
| Aleksey Kosygin | Алексей Косыгин | Alexei Kosygin | Sovcomflot | 10 April 2019 | 17 June 2021 | 6 April 2022 | 24 December 2025 | 174,000 m^{3} | LNG carrier | 041 | 9904546 | In service | Stern section built by Samsung Heavy Industries in South Korea | |
| Pyotr Stolypin | Пётр Столы́пин | Pyotr Stolypin | Smart LNG (Sovcomflot/Novatek) | January 2020 | 20 August 2021 | December 2022 | 2023 (planned) | 174,000 m^{3} | LNG carrier | 042 | 9904675 | Launched | Stern section built by Samsung Heavy Industries in South Korea | |
| Sergei Witte | Сергей Витте | Sergei Witte | Smart LNG (Sovcomflot/Novatek) | January 2020 | 10 December 2021 | 27 July 2023 | 2023 (planned) | 174,000 m^{3} | LNG carrier | 043 | 9904687 | Launched | Stern section built by Samsung Heavy Industries in South Korea | |
| Viktor Chernomyrdin | Виктор Черномырдин | Viktor Chernomyrdin | Smart LNG (Sovcomflot/Novatek) | January 2020 | 23 March 2022 | March 2024–April 2024 | 2023 (planned) | 174,000 m^{3} | LNG carrier | 044 | 9904699 | Launched | Stern section built by Samsung Heavy Industries in South Korea | |
| Konstantin Posiet | Константи́н Посье́т | Konstantin Posyet | Smart LNG (Sovcomflot/Novatek) | January 2020 | 27 June 2022 | March 2024–April 2024 | June 2026 | 174,000 m^{3} | LNG carrier | 045 | 9904704 | In service | Stern section built by Samsung Heavy Industries in South Korea | |
| | | | Smart LNG (Sovcomflot/Novatek) | 7 September 2020 | | | 2024 (planned) | 174,000 m^{3} | LNG carrier | 046 | 9918779 | Under construction | Co-operation agreement with Samsung Heavy Industries terminated in June 2025. | |
| | | | Smart LNG (Sovcomflot/Novatek) | 7 September 2020 | | | 2024 (planned) | 174,000 m^{3} | LNG carrier | 047 | 9918781 | Under construction | Co-operation agreement with Samsung Heavy Industries terminated in June 2025. | |
| | | | Smart LNG (Sovcomflot/Novatek) | 7 September 2020 | | | 2024 (planned) | 174,000 m^{3} | LNG carrier | 048 | 9918793 | Ordered | Co-operation agreement with Samsung Heavy Industries terminated in June 2025. | |
| | | | Smart LNG (Sovcomflot/Novatek) | 7 September 2020 | | | 2024 (planned) | 174,000 m^{3} | LNG carrier | 049 | 9918808 | Ordered | Co-operation agreement with Samsung Heavy Industries terminated in June 2025. | |
| | | | Smart LNG (Sovcomflot/Novatek) | 7 September 2020 | | | 2024 (planned) | 174,000 m^{3} | LNG carrier | 050 | 9918810 | Ordered | Co-operation agreement with Samsung Heavy Industries terminated in June 2025. | |
| | | | Smart LNG (Sovcomflot/Novatek) | 7 September 2020 | | | 2025 (planned) | 174,000 m^{3} | LNG carrier | 051 | 9918822 | Ordered | Co-operation agreement with Samsung Heavy Industries terminated in June 2025. | |
| | | | Smart LNG (Sovcomflot/Novatek) | 7 September 2020 | | | 2025 (planned) | 174,000 m^{3} | LNG carrier | 052 | 9918834 | Ordered | Co-operation agreement with Samsung Heavy Industries terminated in June 2025. | |
| | | | Smart LNG (Sovcomflot/Novatek) | 7 September 2020 | | | 2025 (planned) | 174,000 m^{3} | LNG carrier | 053 | 9918846 | Ordered | Co-operation agreement with Samsung Heavy Industries terminated in June 2025. | |
| | | | Smart LNG (Sovcomflot/Novatek) | 7 September 2020 | | | 2025 (planned) | 174,000 m^{3} | LNG carrier | 054 | 9918858 | Ordered | Co-operation agreement with Samsung Heavy Industries terminated in June 2025. | |
| | | | Smart LNG (Sovcomflot/Novatek) | 7 September 2020 | | | 2025 (planned) | 174,000 m^{3} | LNG carrier | 055 | 9918860 | Ordered | Co-operation agreement with Samsung Heavy Industries terminated in June 2025. | |
| Rossiya | Россия | Russia | Atomflot | 23 April 2020 | 5 July 2021 | | 2027 (original plan); 2030 (current estimate) | 120 MW | Icebreaker | 056 | 9911238 | Keel laid | First of three planned Project 10510 "Leader" nuclear-powered icebreakers | |
| | | | Atomflot | | | | 2030 (planned) | 120 MW | Icebreaker | | 9945930 | Cancelled | | |
| | | | Atomflot | | | | 2032 (planned) | 120 MW | Icebreaker | | 9945942 | Cancelled | | |
| Akademik V. I. Ilichev | Академик В. И. Ильичев | Viktor Ilyichev | Russian Academy of Sciences | 22 December 2020 | 18 February 2022 | | 2024–2025 (planned) | | Research vessel | 071 | 9926489 | Under construction | | |
| Akademik A. P. Lisitsyn | Академик А. П. Лисицын | Alexander Lisitsyn | Russian Academy of Sciences | 22 December 2020 | | | 2024–2025 (planned) | | Research vessel | 072 | 9926491 | Under construction | | |
| Mikhail Yegorov | Михаил Егоров | Mikhail Yegorov | Coalstar | September 2021 | 7 May 2025 | | | 86,400 DWT | Bulk carrier | 074 | | Keel laid | | |
| Meliton Kantaria | Мелитон Кантария | Meliton Kantaria | Coalstar | September 2021 | 7 May 2025 | | | 86,400 DWT | Bulk carrier | | | Keel laid | | |
| | | | Coalstar | September 2021 | | | | 86,400 DWT | Bulk carrier | | | Ordered | | |
| | | | Coalstar | September 2021 | | | | 86,400 DWT | Bulk carrier | | | Ordered | | |
| | | | Coalstar | September 2021 | | | | 86,400 DWT | Bulk carrier | | | Ordered | | |
| Vladimir Monomakh | Владимир Мономах | Vladimir II Monomakh | Rosnefteflot | 1 September 2016 | 11 September 2018 | 12 May 2020 | 11 December 2020 | 114,000 DWT | Crude oil tanker | 131010 | 9842176 | In service | Stern section built by Hyundai Samho Heavy Industries in South Korea | |
| Vladimir Vinogradov | Владимир Виноградов | Vladimir Vinogradov | Rosnefteflot | 1 September 2016 | 26 April 2019 | 25 August 2021 | 7 June 2022 | 114,000 DWT | Crude oil tanker | 131020 | 9842188 | In service | Stern section built by Hyundai Samho Heavy Industries in South Korea | |
| Akademik Gubkin | Академик Губкин | Ivan Gubkin | Rosnefteflot | 1 September 2016 | 16 September 2019 | 5 September 2022 | 29 June 2023 | 114,000 DWT | Crude oil tanker | 131030 | 9842190 | In service | Stern section built by Hyundai Samho Heavy Industries in South Korea | |
| | | | Rosnefteflot | 1 September 2016 | 16 October 2019 | | 2021 (planned) | 114,000 DWT | Crude oil tanker | 131040 | 9842205 | Keel laid | Stern section built by Hyundai Samho Heavy Industries in South Korea | |
| | | | Rosnefteflot | 1 September 2016 | 6 July 2020 | | 2021 (planned) | 114,000 DWT | Crude oil tanker | 131050 | 9842217 | Keel laid | | |
| Nursultan Nazarbayev | Нурсултан Назарбаев | Nursultan Nazarbayev | Rosnefteflot | 25 September 2017 | 1 December 2020 | | 2021 (planned) | 114,000 DWT | Crude oil tanker | 131060 | 9898254 | Keel laid | Stern section built by Hyundai Samho Heavy Industries in South Korea | |
| Akademik Ivanter | Академик Ивантер | Viktor Ivanter | Rosnefteflot | 25 September 2017 | 4 March 2021 | | 2022 (planned) | 114,000 DWT | Crude oil tanker | 131070 | 9899002 | Keel laid | Stern section built by Hyundai Samho Heavy Industries in South Korea | |
| | | | Rosnefteflot | 25 September 2017 | 30 March 2021 | | 2022 (planned) | 114,000 DWT | Crude oil tanker | 131080 | 9908994 | Keel laid | | |
| | | | Rosnefteflot | 25 September 2017 | | | 2022 (planned) | 114,000 DWT | Crude oil tanker | | | Ordered | | |
| | | | Rosnefteflot | 25 September 2017 | | | 2022 (planned) | 114,000 DWT | Crude oil tanker | | | Ordered | | |
| Okeansky Prospect | Океанский проспект | Street in Vladivostok | Sovcomflot | 11 September 2018 | 30 November 2020 | | 29 December 2022 | 114,000 DWT | Crude oil tanker | 131110 | 9866380 | In service | Stern section built by Hyundai Samho Heavy Industries in South Korea | |
| Vostochnyy Prospect | Восточный проспект | Street in Vladivostok | Sovcomflot | 11 September 2018 | 30 March 2021 | 29 June 2023 | 6 December 2023 | 114,000 DWT | Crude oil tanker | 131120 | 9866392 | In service | Hull blocks built in South Korea | |
| Katerina Velikaya | Катерина Великая | Catherine the Great | Rosnefteflot | 4 September 2015 | 8 September 2017 | 15 December 2020 | June 2019–September 2019 (planned) | | Offshore supply vessel | 562001 | 9845520 | Launched | | |
| Svyataya Mariya | Святая Мария | Mary, mother of Jesus | Rosnefteflot | 4 September 2015 | 8 September 2017 | | June 2019–September 2019 (planned) | | Offshore supply vessel | 562002 | 9845532 | Launched | | |
| Aleksandr Nevsky | Александр Невский | Alexander Nevsky | Rosnefteflot | 1 September 2016 | 8 September 2017 | | December 2019–April 2020 (planned) | | Offshore supply vessel | 562003 | 9845544 | Launched | Being built at Damen Mangalia shipyard in Romania; construction stopped due to EU sanctions against Russia. | |
| Vladimir Monomakh | Владимир Мономах | Vladimir II Monomakh | Rosnefteflot | 1 September 2016 | 8 September 2017 | | December 2019–April 2020 (planned) | | Offshore supply vessel | 562004 | 9845556 | Launched | Being built at Damen Mangalia shipyard in Romania; construction stopped due to EU sanctions against Russia. | |
| | | | Rosnefteflot | 19 October 2017 | | | 2023–2025 (planned) | 42,000 DWT | Shuttle tanker | | | Ordered | | |
| | | | Rosnefteflot | 19 October 2017 | | | 2023–2025 (planned) | 42,000 DWT | Shuttle tanker | | | Ordered | | |
| | | | Rosnefteflot | 19 October 2017 | | | 2023–2025 (planned) | 42,000 DWT | Shuttle tanker | | | Ordered | | |
| | | | Rosnefteflot | 19 October 2017 | | | 2023–2025 (planned) | 42,000 DWT | Shuttle tanker | | | Ordered | | |
| | | | Rosnefteflot | 19 October 2017 | | | 2023–2025 (planned) | 42,000 DWT | Shuttle tanker | | | Ordered | | |
| | | | Rosnefteflot | 19 October 2017 | | | 2023–2025 (planned) | 42,000 DWT | Shuttle tanker | | | Ordered | | |
| | | | Rosnefteflot | 19 October 2017 | | | 2023–2025 (planned) | 42,000 DWT | Shuttle tanker | | | Ordered | | |
| | | | Rosnefteflot | 19 October 2017 | | | 2023–2025 (planned) | 42,000 DWT | Shuttle tanker | | | Ordered | | |
| | | | Rosnefteflot | 19 October 2017 | | | 2023–2025 (planned) | 42,000 DWT | Shuttle tanker | | | Ordered | | |
| | | | Rosnefteflot | 19 October 2017 | | | 2023–2025 (planned) | 42,000 DWT | Shuttle tanker | | | Ordered | | |
| | | | Rosmorport | 24 May 2018 | | | 2021 (planned) | 6.4 MW | Shallow-draught icebreaker | | | Cancelled | Contract included options for three similar vessels. | |

== See also ==
- List of shipyards of the Soviet Union
