= Companies listed on the New York Stock Exchange (K) =

== K ==
Stock name	Symbol	Country of origin
Kadant	KAI	US
Kaman Corporation	KAMN	US
Kansas City Southn Inds	KSU.PR	US
Kapstone	KS	US
KAR Auction Services	KAR	US
Kate Spade & Company	KATE	US
Kayne Anderson Energy Development Company	KED	US
Kayne Anderson Energy Total Return Fund	KYE	US
Kayne Anderson Midstream/Energy Fund	KMF	US
Kayne Anderson MLP Investment Company	KYN	US
Kayne Anderson MLP Investment Company	KYN.PRE	US
Kayne Anderson MLP Investment Company	KYN.PRF	US
Kayne Anderson MLP Investment Company	KYN.PRG	US
KB Financial Group	KB	South Korea
KB Home	KBH	US
KBR	KBR	US
KCAP Financial	KAP	US
KCG Holdings	KCG	US
KE Holdings	BEKE	China
Kellanova	K	US
WK Kellogg Co	KLG	US
KEMET	KEM	US
Kemper Corporation	KMPA	US
Kemper Corporation	KMPR	US
Kennametal	KMT	US
Kennedy-Wilson Holdings	KW	US
Kennedy-Wilson Holdings	KWN	US
Key Energy Services	KEG	US
KeyCorp	KEY	US
KeyCorp	KEY.PRG	US
Kilroy Realty Corporation	KRC	US
Kilroy Realty Corporation	KRC.PRG	US
Kilroy Realty Corporation	KRC.PRH	US
Kimberly-Clark	KMB	US
Kimco Realty	KIM	US
Kimco Realty	KIM.PRH	US
Kimco Realty Corporation	KIM.PRI	US
Kimco Realty Corporation	KIM.PRJ	US
Kimco Realty Corporation	KIM.PRK	US
Kinder Morgan	KMI	US
Kinder Morgan	KMI.WS	US
Kinder Morgan Energy Partners	KMP	US
Kinder Morgan Management	KMR	US
Kindred Healthcare	KND	US
King	KING	Ireland
Kingsway Financial Services	KFS	Canada
Kinross Gold	KGC	Canada
Kirby Corporation	KEX	US
Kite Realty Group Trust	KRG	US
Kite Realty Group Trust	KRG.PRA	US
KKR	KKR	US
KKR Financial Holdings	KFH	US
KKR Financial Holdings	KFI	US
KKR Financial Holdings	KFN.PR	US
KKR Income Opportunities Fund	KIO	US
KMG Chemicals	KMG	US
Knight Transportation	KNX	US
Knoll	KNL	US
Knutsen NYK Offshore Tankers	KNOP	US
Knowles Corporation	KN	US
Kohl's	KSS	US
Konami	KNM	Japan
Koninklijke Philips	PHG	Netherlands
Koppers	KOP	US
Korea Electric Power Corporation	KEP	South Korea
Korea Equity Fund	KEF	US
The Korea Fund	KF	US
Korn Ferry	KFY	US
Kosmos Energy	KOS	US
Kraton Performance Polymers	KRA	US
Krispy Kreme	KKD	US
Kroger	KR	US
KRONOS Worldwide	KRO	US
KT Corporation	KT	South Korea
Kyocera	KYO	Japan
