= Aleksey Kosygin (2025 ship) =

LPG carrier ship built in 2025

History

Russia
- Name: Aleksey Kosygin
- Namesake: Alexei Kosygin
- Owner: Sovcomflot
- Operator: Novatek
- Port of registry: Saint Petersburg, Russia
- Builder: SSK "Zvezda" (Russia)
- Yard number: 041
- Laid down: 15 June 2021
- Christened: 11 September 2023
- Completed: 25 December 2025
- Identification: IMO number: 9904546; Call sign: UASA7; MMSI number: 273253270
- Status: in active service, as of 2025

General characteristics
- Type: LNG carrier
- Tonnage: 127,555 GT; 38,266 NT; 88,117 DWT
- Displacement: 135,089 t (132,955 long tons)
- Length: 300 m (984 ft 3 in)
- Beam: 48.8 m (160 ft 1 in)
- Draught: 12.3 m (40 ft 4 in)
- Depth: 26.0 m (85 ft 4 in)
- Ice class: RS Arc7
- Installed power: 2 × MAN 12V51/60DF (2 × 13,800 kW); 4 × MAN 8L51/60DF (4 × 9,200 kW)
- Propulsion: Diesel-electric; three azimuth thrusters (3 × 15 MW)
- Capacity: 172,906 m³ of LNG

Aleksey Kosygin is the first Russian-built liquefied natural gas (LNG) carrier with the high ice class Arc7. The vessel was built at the Zvezda shipbuilding complex in Bolshoy Kamen, Primorsky Krai based on a design developed by Samsung Heavy Industries.

Aleksey Kosygin is intended for year-round LNG transportation via the Northern Sea Route as part of Novatek's Arctic LNG 2 project.

== Ship history ==
Named after Alexei Kosygin (1904–1980), Chairman of the Council of Ministers of the USSR (1964–1980) and the architect of the 1965 economic reforms.

Construction began following 2019–2022 contracts with Samsung Heavy Industries for a series of 15 Arc7 LNG carriers. Due to the 2022 sanctions, Samsung supplied only the hulls and equipment for the first vessels. Ths tanker was included in US and Ukrainian sanctions prior to its launch. The Arctic LNG 2 project has been under pressure since 2023, but the vessel was commissioned.

The tanker was launched in the dry dock of the SSK Zvezda and underwent gas trials.

On December 24, 2025, the tanker was handed over to the operator Sovcomflot with the participation of President Vladimir Putin. On December 29, the vessel embarked on its first voyage to the Utrenny terminal in Gydan.

== Design ==
The Arc7-class vessel can independently navigate through ice over 2.1 meters (6 ft 11 in) thick using the Double Acting Ship mode (moving stern-first).

The hull is reinforced for Arctic conditions with cryogenic tanks operating at −160 °C (−256 °F). Three azimuthing propulsion units produced at the Sapphire facility (SSK Zvezda) provide maneuverability in ice. The design is based on the Samsung 172 Yamalmax (SN2366).

== Operational activity ==
The tanker operates for the Arctic LNG 2 project. It performs 2–3 voyages per month in winter (carrying 250,000 tons of LNG), addressing logistical challenges in the Ob Bay. Transshipment in Murmansk is possible.

Aleksey Kosygin is the lead vessel of the series. At least 15 vessels are required for the project.

== See also ==
- Gas carrier
- LNG carrier
- List of tankers
