= Ice navigation vessel =

Class of ships

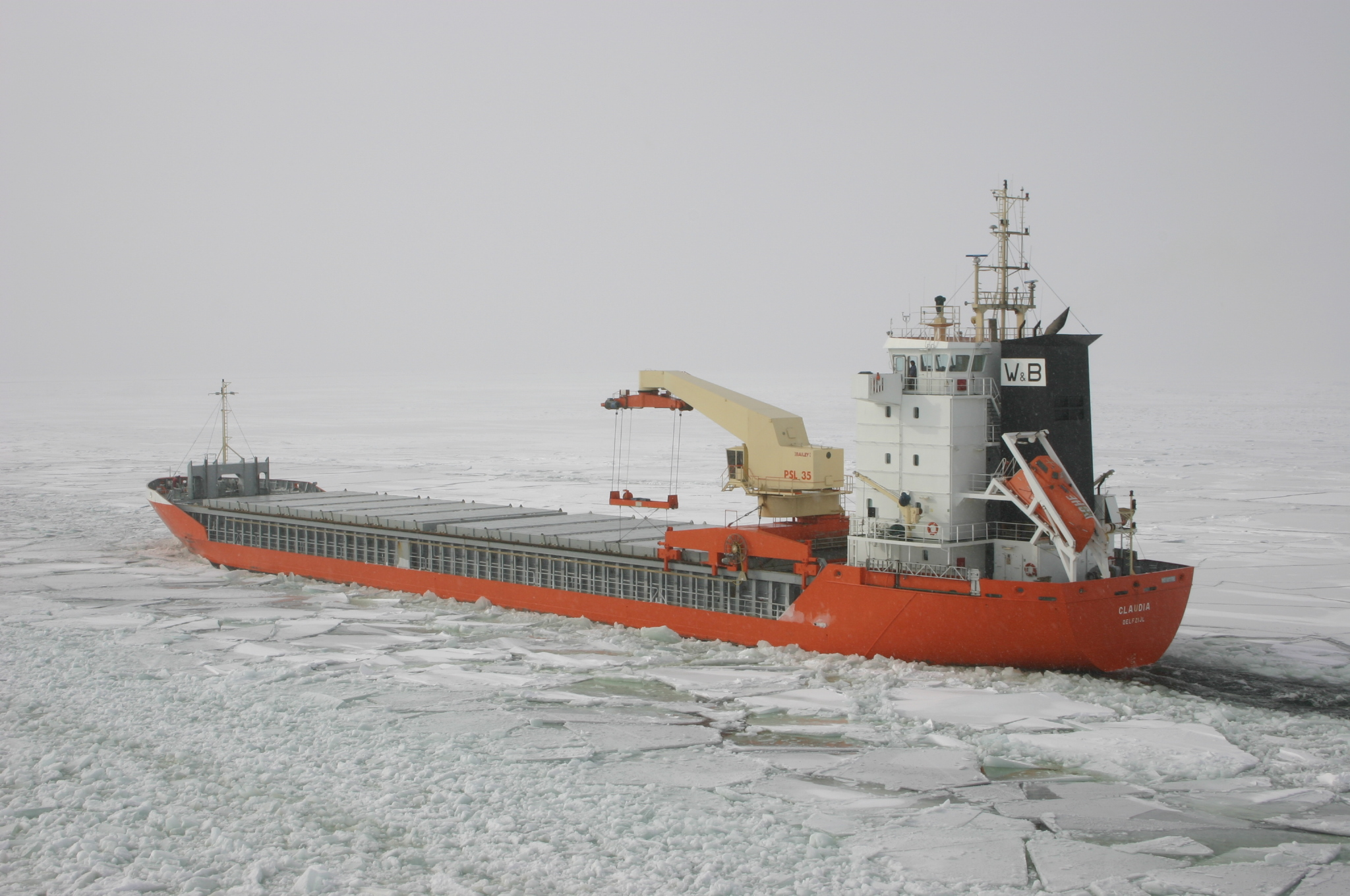
Cargo ship navigating in ice, Gulf of Bothnia

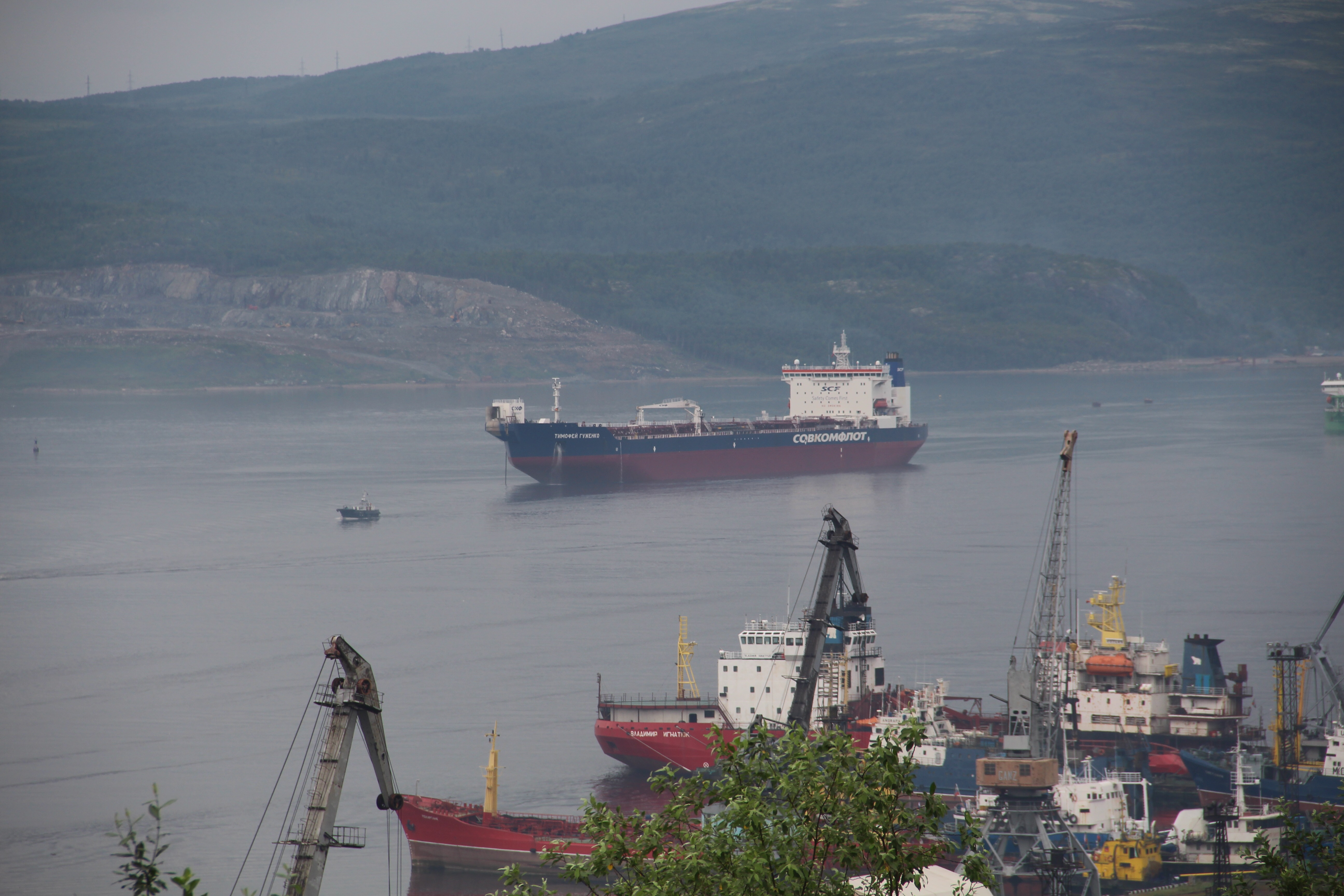
Icebreaking bow of the tanker Timofey Guzhenko

Ice navigation vessel, or ice-strengthened vessel, is a class of ships specially prepared for independent ice navigation in the waters of the polar seas and for following icebreakers in especially difficult ice conditions. Various registration authorities assign ice classes to vessels based on their technical characteristics. Due to this, ice navigation vessels are usually referred to as ice-class vessels without indicating which class they belong to, but indicating the type of vessel (e.g. ice-class tanker, ice-class cargo ship etc).

The geometry of the hull contours of ice navigation ships is intermediate between the contours of an icebreaker and the shape of a conventional transport vessel. The reliability of any vessel of this type is determined by their ability to withstand the loads acting on them while sailing in ice at a given speed, as well as the loads from compression by ice masses. The target capabilities determine the requirements for enhanced capacity of its engine, the strength of the hull, propellers, propeller shaft and steering gear. It may also include adaptations for functioning in freezing conditions, equipment necessary for navigation in ice and anti-icing system for the hull.

== Ice-strengthened vessels ==
The ice navigation ships are also often referred as ice-strengthened vessels. This term has no international standard and its definition may vary in different countries. In general, it is more commonly used for various research and expedition ships and less commonly for merchant cargo ships. The common characteristics of these vessels are the presence of an ice belt or a double hull with its geometry similar to that of icebreakers. Also, the hull is made of durable materials and is smooth and free of protruding fasteners to reduce friction. The water intake is designed so that the engine is not clogged with ice, the ship's rudder and propeller are protected from external damage.

== Icebreaker-transport vessels ==
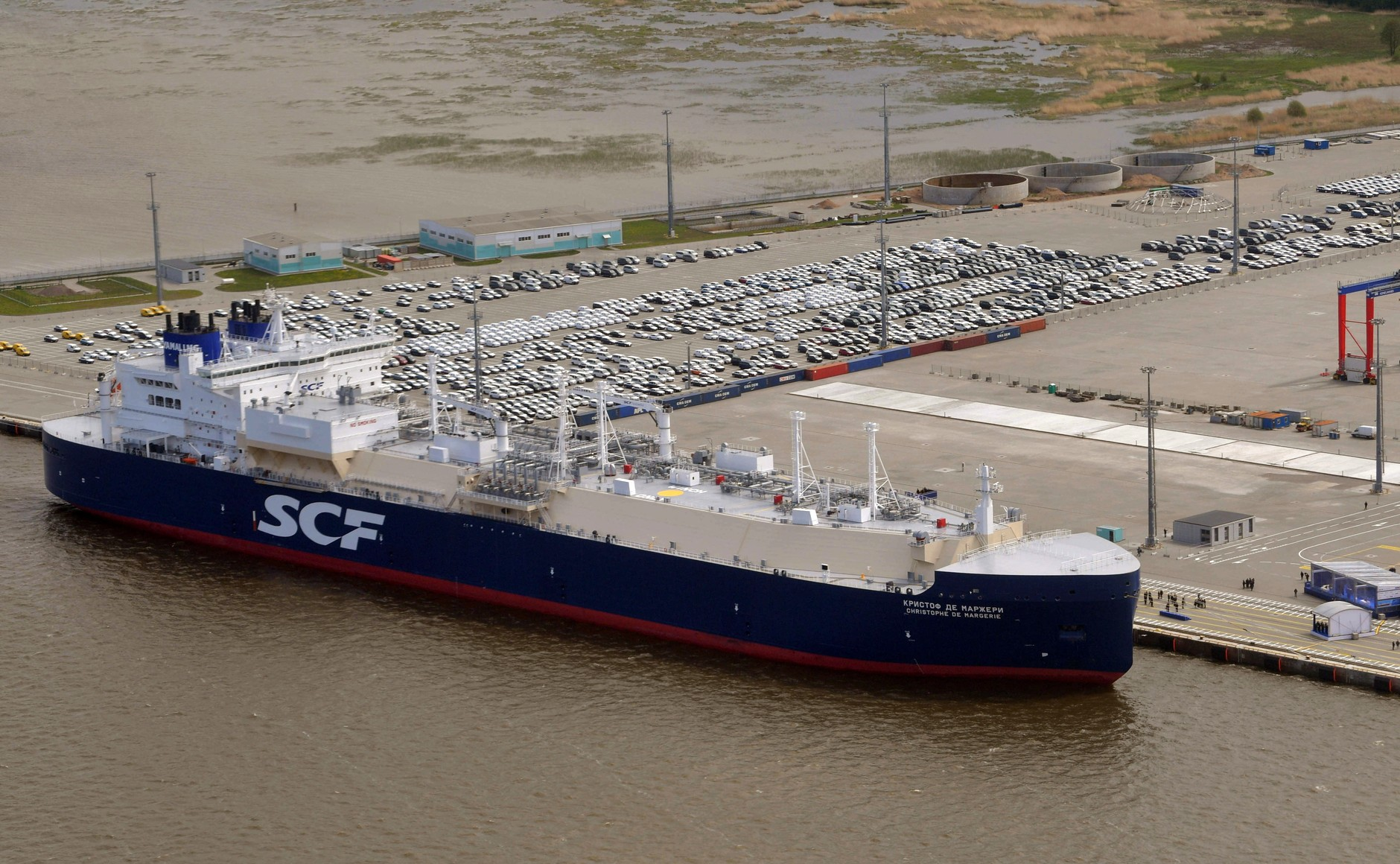
Christophe de Margerie, LNG icebreaker-tanker of type Yamalmax

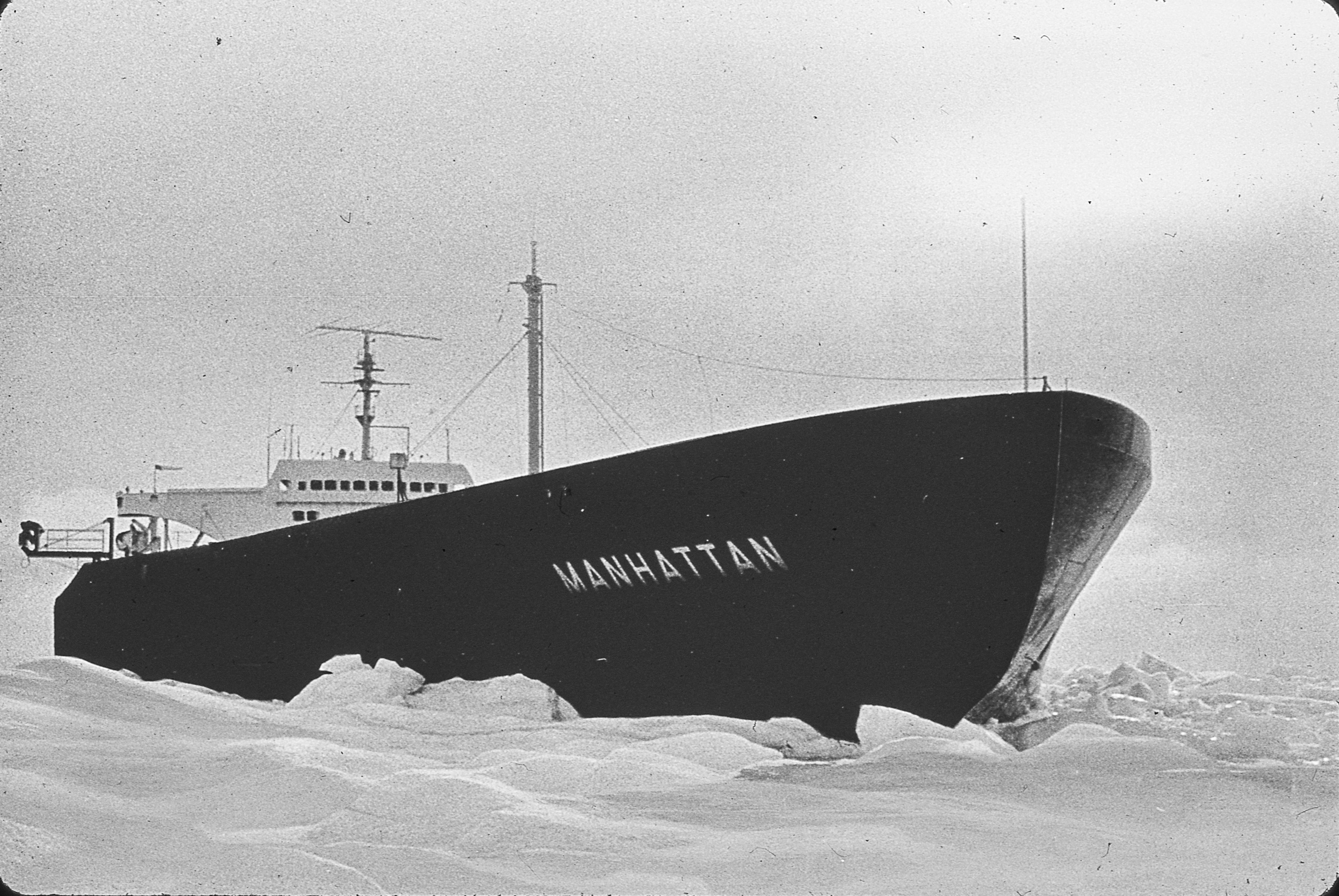
SS Manhattan during a 1969 transit through the Northwest Passage

The term icebreaker-transport vessels is applied to a part of ice navigation vessels, namely, to such cargo and research vessels that are capable of systematic navigation through the ice of freezing non-polar and polar seas during the entire navigation season, both independently and in cooperation with an icebreaker. Following the example of the Sevmorput ship, which is referred to as them, ice navigation ships are called icebreaker-transport ships if the capacity of their ship engines allows free navigation in ice and they most likely do not need to be accompanied by an icebreaker. The shaft power of some vessels of this class can be comparable to the most powerful icebreakers currently in existence. For example, the shaft power of Yamalmax-type ships is 45 MW, and the same figure for nuclear-powered icebreakers of Arktika-class is 49.5 MW. And since specialized icebreakers are also actively used for transport purposes within their capabilities, the term “icebreaker-transport vessel” is often applied to them too. Thus, in general, the assignment of transport ships to this class means that they can be classified as icebreakers according to their technical characteristics and means that, despite their main transport purpose, they can be used as icebreakers for other ships if they have similar routes.

Compared to conventional icebreakers, vessels of this class can overcome ice hummocks more efficiently due to their greater mass. But since all merchant vessels as a whole have long sides, which, in the case of movement in ice, create significant friction and resistance to the movement of the vessel, in a number of cases they need the assistance of icebreakers, despite the high capacity of their ship engines. The elongated shape of these vessels also increases their susceptibility to sea ice compression.

And by analogy with the informal term "ice-class ship", clarifications by the type of ship are used for this class of vessels too. For example, an icebreaker-transport container ship or, for short, an icebreaker-container ship in the case of Sevmorput, an icebreaker-tanker in the case of Timofey Guzhenko, etc. Since the characteristics of ships of this class and their icebreaking ability are close to conventional icebreakers, the names "the biggest icebreaker in history" or "the biggest icebreaker in the world" are sometimes used for large vessels.

== Double-acting ships ==
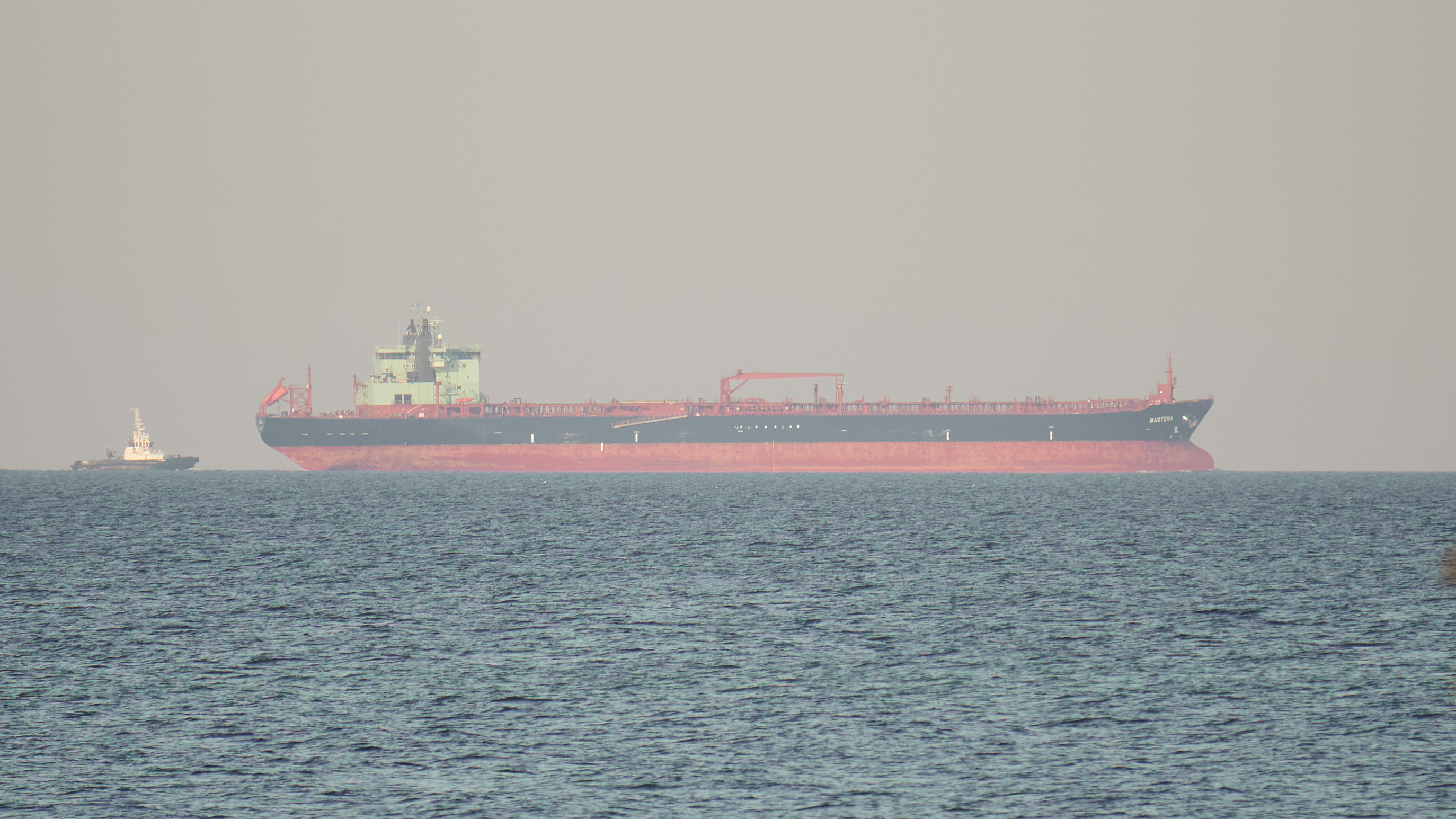
Double acting tanker Mastera with bulbous bow and icebreaking stern

One of the varieties of ice navigation vessels are double-acting ships. To move through the ice, they use the combined effect of the ice-breaking shape of the ship's stern and the effect of the propellers on the ice. These vessels may have the usual bulbous bow and may be capable of moving in ice only astern. Since ice sailing astern also eliminates the stress on the hull that occurs when breaking ice in the classical way, this type of vessel has advantages. Due to the icebreaking use of their stern, it is impossible to equip these ships with a conventional rudder and they can only be driven by rudder propellers. It should also be noted that ships with an icebreaking shape of the bow and stern, as a rule, move through the ice in the classical way to reduce propeller wear and use stern-forward movement only in severe ice conditions.
