= SS Manhattan (1961) =

American oil tanker

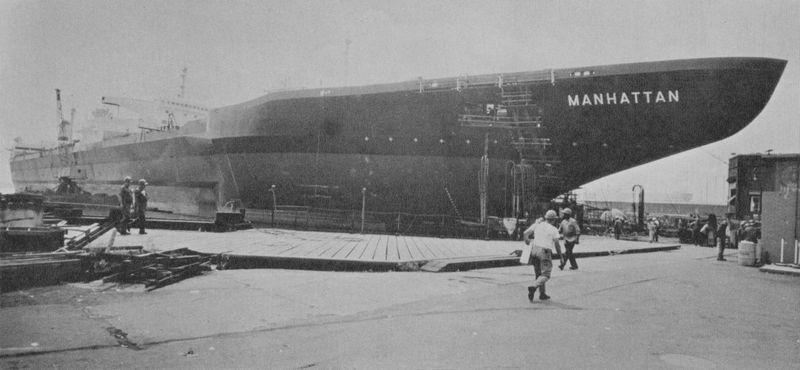
- SS Manhattan in 1969

History

United States
- Builder: Fore River Shipyard
- Launched: 18 December 1961
- Identification: IMO number: 5219369
- Fate: Scrapped c.1987

General characteristics as built
- Type: Oil tanker
- Tonnage: 105,000 deadweight tonnage
- Length: 1,005 ft (306 m)
- Beam: 132 ft (40 m)
- Speed: 17–18 knots (31–33 km/h; 20–21 mph)

General characteristics post conversion
- Type: Oil tanker icebreaker
- Tonnage: 115,000 deadweight tonnage
- Length: 1,005 ft (306 m)
- Beam: 148 ft (45 m)
- Draft: 52 ft (16 m)
- Installed power: 43,000 shp (32,000 kW)
- Speed: 17 knots (31 km/h; 20 mph)

SS Manhattan was an oil tanker constructed at the Fore River Shipyard in Quincy, Massachusetts, that became the first commercial ship to cross the Northwest Passage in 1969. Having been built as an ordinary tanker in 1962, she was refitted for ice navigation during this voyage with an icebreaker bow in 1968–69.

Registered in the United States at the time, she was the largest US merchant vessel.

In 1965, she was taken to Portland, Oregon via the Columbia River, to be cleaned and used to transport 50,000 tons of grain. The size and draught of the ship required careful preparations for her transit on the river.

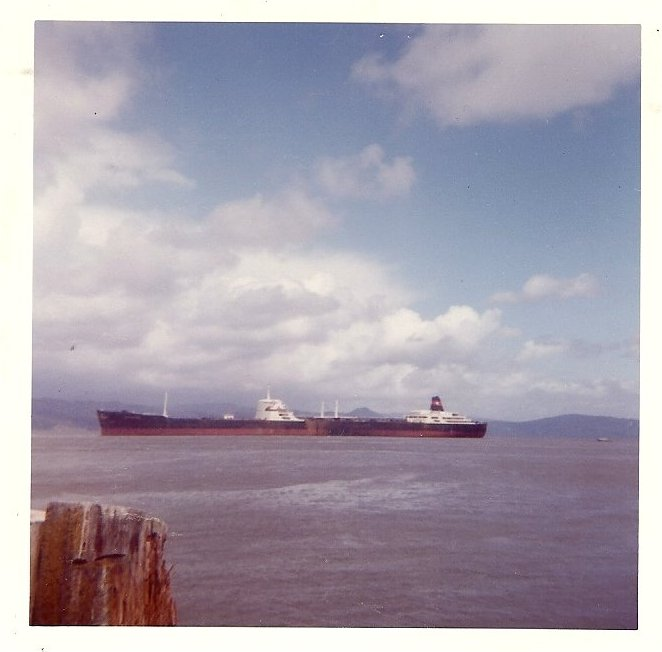
SS Manhattan passing Astoria, Oregon, 1965.

Manhattan remained in service until 1987. After an accident in East Asia she was scrapped in China.

== 1969 Northwest Passage transit ==
Manhattan's route began in August 1969 from a berth on the Delaware River near Chester Pa. on the east coast of North America and transited the passage from east to west via the Baffin Sea and Viscount Melville Sound. The master of Manhattan was Captain Roger A. Steward, with 95 sailors. Heavy sea ice blocked the way through M'Clure Strait, so a more southerly route through Prince of Wales Strait and south of Banks Island was used. A single, token barrel of crude oil was loaded at Prudhoe Bay and then the ship went back. She was escorted by the Canadian Coast Guard icebreaker CCGS John A. Macdonald. At various times during the expedition, Manhattan was supported by the icebreakers CCGS Louis S. St-Laurent, USCGC Staten Island, and USCGC Northwind.

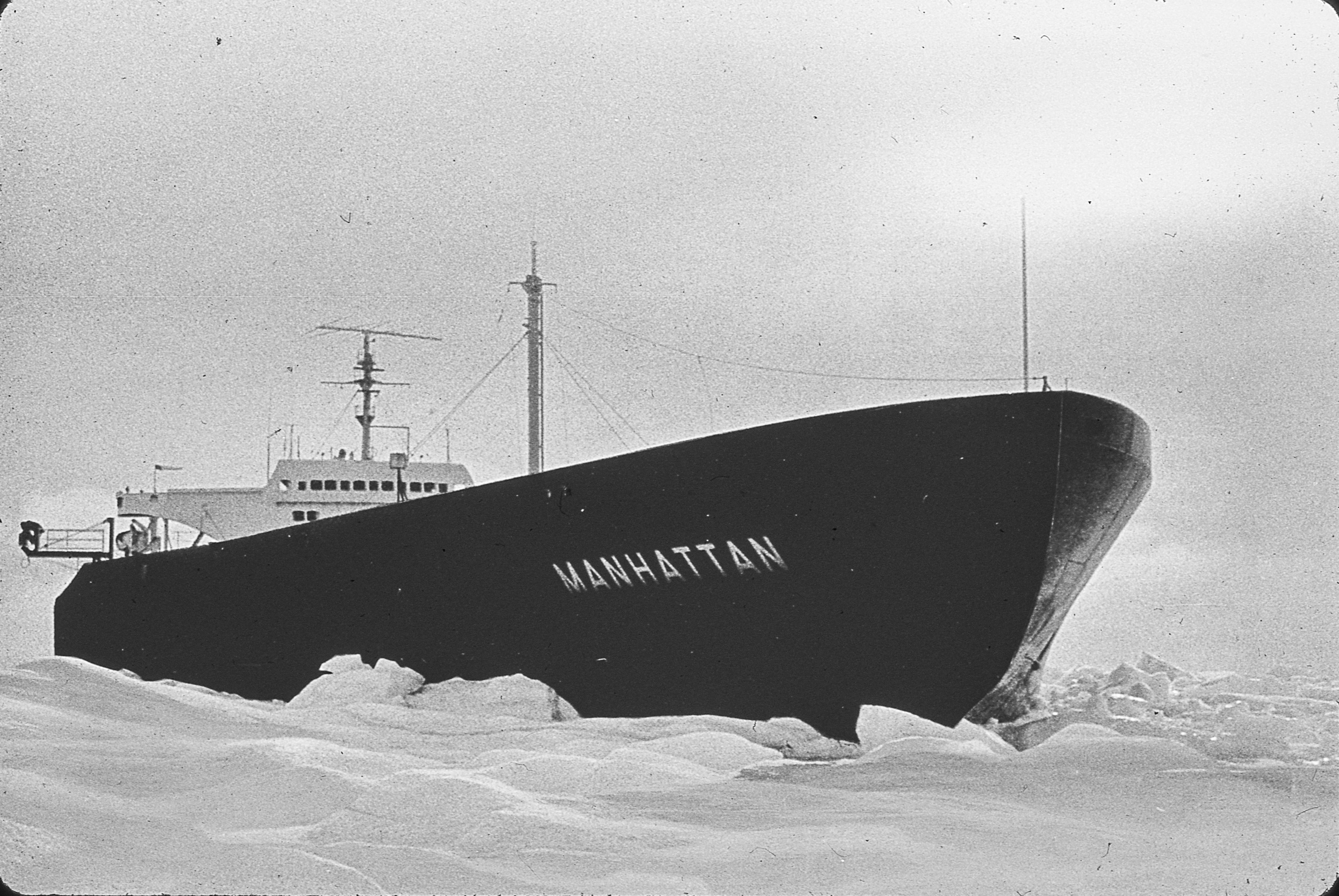
SS Manhattan during a transit

This route through the Northwest Passage was quite controversial in international relations as sovereignty of these waters is claimed by Canada and this claim has been disputed by the United States. The Government of Canada has defined all waters in the Canadian Arctic Archipelago as being "Canadian Internal Waters".

The voyage prompted passionate discussions in Canada about that country's sovereignty in the Arctic, a topic that dominated Arctic policy formulated under Prime Minister Pierre Trudeau's administration throughout the 1970s. At one point during the voyage, Inuit hunters stopped the vessel and demanded that the vessel master ask permission to cross through Canadian territory, which he did, and they granted. The Canadian sovereignty debate generated by Manhattan is being rekindled as multi-year decreases in sea ice, due to global warming, make further ship transits likely in the future. The question is whether the passage can be considered an international strait or not.

The official reason for the voyage revolved around oil that had been discovered at Prudhoe Bay in 1968. Oil companies reasoned that sea transport of oil by icebreaking supertankers would be cheaper than the building of the Trans-Alaska Pipeline System to Valdez. A second attempt to cross the passage in winter proved impossible, and there were numerous environmental concerns with the project, so it was cancelled and the Trans-Alaska pipeline built.

== Icebreaker design using ice models ==
The conversion of Manhattan was a co-operation between its owner Esso and Wärtsilä, a Finnish shipbuilding company. Esso motivated for the use of models to optimize the ice breaking performance of the vessel, therefore the Wärtsilä Icebreaking Model Basin (WIMB) ice tank was built inside a converted air raid shelter in Helsinki, Finland, solely for this project. It was later used for Wärtsilä's own purposes until it was replaced by a new facility in the 1980s. Aker Arctic Technology, the Finnish engineering company that now uses the new ice tank thus owes its existence to the Manhattan project.

== In popular culture ==
In 1969, the SS Manhattan gave rise to a board game based on its Northwest Passage transit, fittingly titled Northwest Passage!

== See also ==
- Territorial claims in the Arctic
- Northern Sea Route
- Icebreaker-transport vessel
