= Polar code =

Polar code may refer to:

- International Code for Ships Operating in Polar Waters, an international code of safety for ships operating in polar waters
- Polar code (coding theory), a capacity-achieving error-correcting code
