= Knutsen NYK Offshore Tankers =

KNOT Offshore Partners LP
- Traded as: NYSE: KNOP

Knutsen NYK Offshore Tankers (KNOT) is the second largest shuttle tanker operator in the world. KNOT is a joint venture between Norwegian-based Knutsen OAS Shipping and Japanese-based Nippon Yusen Kabushiki Kaisha (NYK), and was set up in 2010 following NYK's acquisition of 50 per cent of the shuttle tanker fleet from Knutsen OAS Shipping. The two companies have a separate joint venture regarding liquefied CO_{2}.

Today KNOT has a fleet of 25 advanced shuttle tankers, 3 new buildings, and one Floating Storage and Offloading Unit (FSO). It operates in numerous places, including the North Sea and Brazil.

A subsidiary, KNOT Offshore Partners LP (KNOP), a master limited partnership, was listed on the New York Stock Exchange in April 2013. KNOP several shuttle tankers in the fleet. It also has the option to acquire all of KNOT's new shuttle tankers.
