= Karen Knutsen =

Manx shuttle tanker

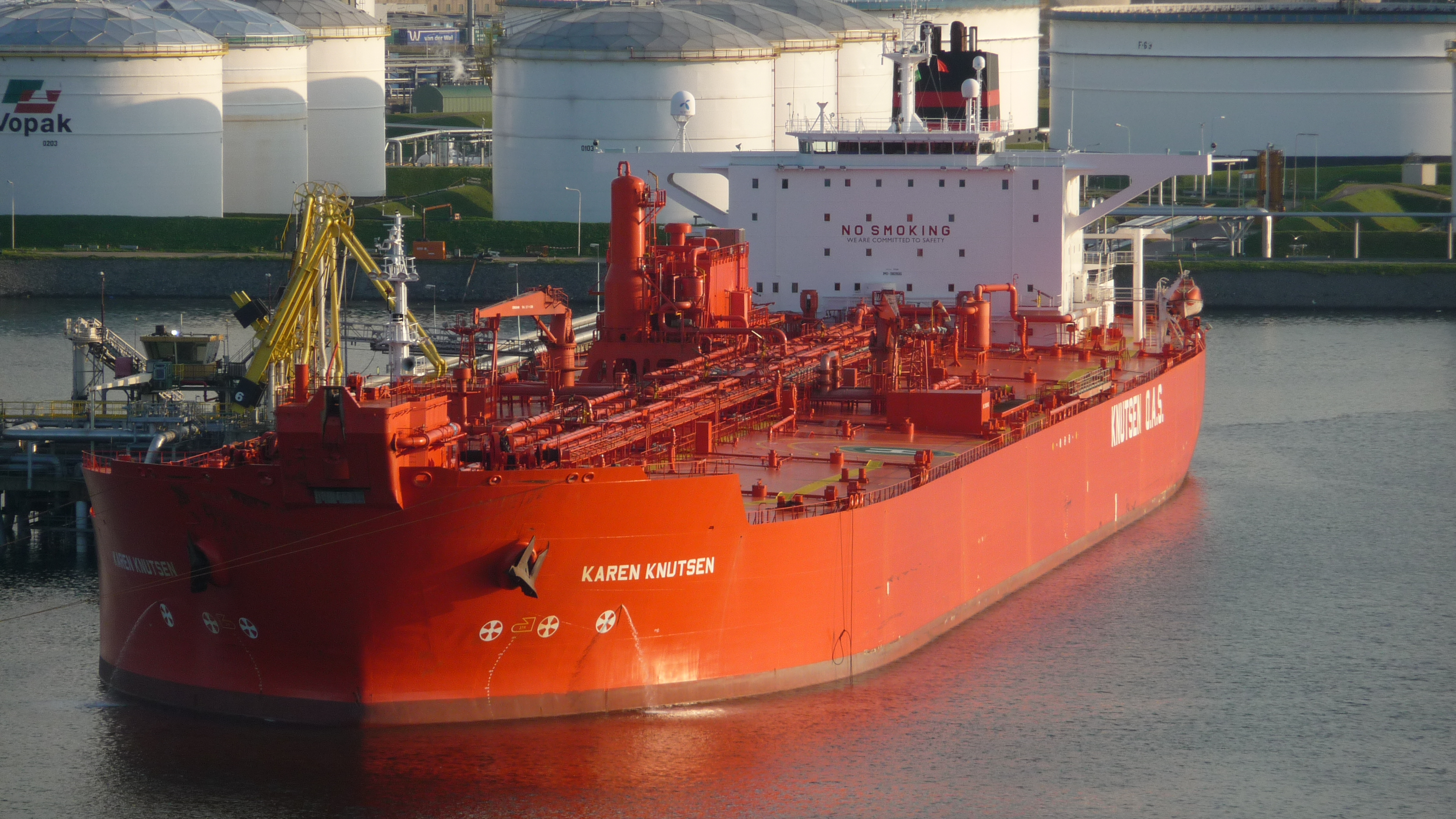

History

Isle of Man
- Name: Knock Whillan (1999–2003); Karen Knutsen (since 2003)
- Owner: Knutsen O.A.S. Shipping AS
- Operator: KNOT Management AS
- Ordered: 4 April 1997
- Builder: Hyundai Heavy Industries. Co,. Ltd., Ulsan, South Korea
- Yard number: 1125
- Laid down: 25 August 1998
- Launched: 4 December 1998
- Completed: 18 March 1999
- In service: 2009–
- Identification: IMO number: 9169615; Call sign: MDKK2
- Status: In service

General characteristics
- Type: Shuttle tanker
- Length: 273.95 m (898.8 ft) LOA, 264.0 m (866.1 ft) LPP
- Beam: 50 m (160 ft)
- Draught: 16.02 m (52.6 ft)
- Speed: 14.7 knots (27.2 km/h; 16.9 mph)

Karen Knutsen is a shuttle tanker built in 1999. It was originally named Knock Whillan flying a Liberian flag. On 15 July 2003 it was renamed Karen Knutsen and reflagged to Isle of Man on 22 December 2003. Its home port is Douglas. It is owned by Knutsen O.A.S. Shipping AS and managed by KNOT Management AS.

== History ==
The ship was originally ordered on 4 April 1997. The keel was laid on 25 August 1998 in yard number 1125 by Hyundai Heavy Industries in Ulsan, South Korea. The launch took place on 4 December 1998, and it was completed on 18 March 1999.

== Description ==
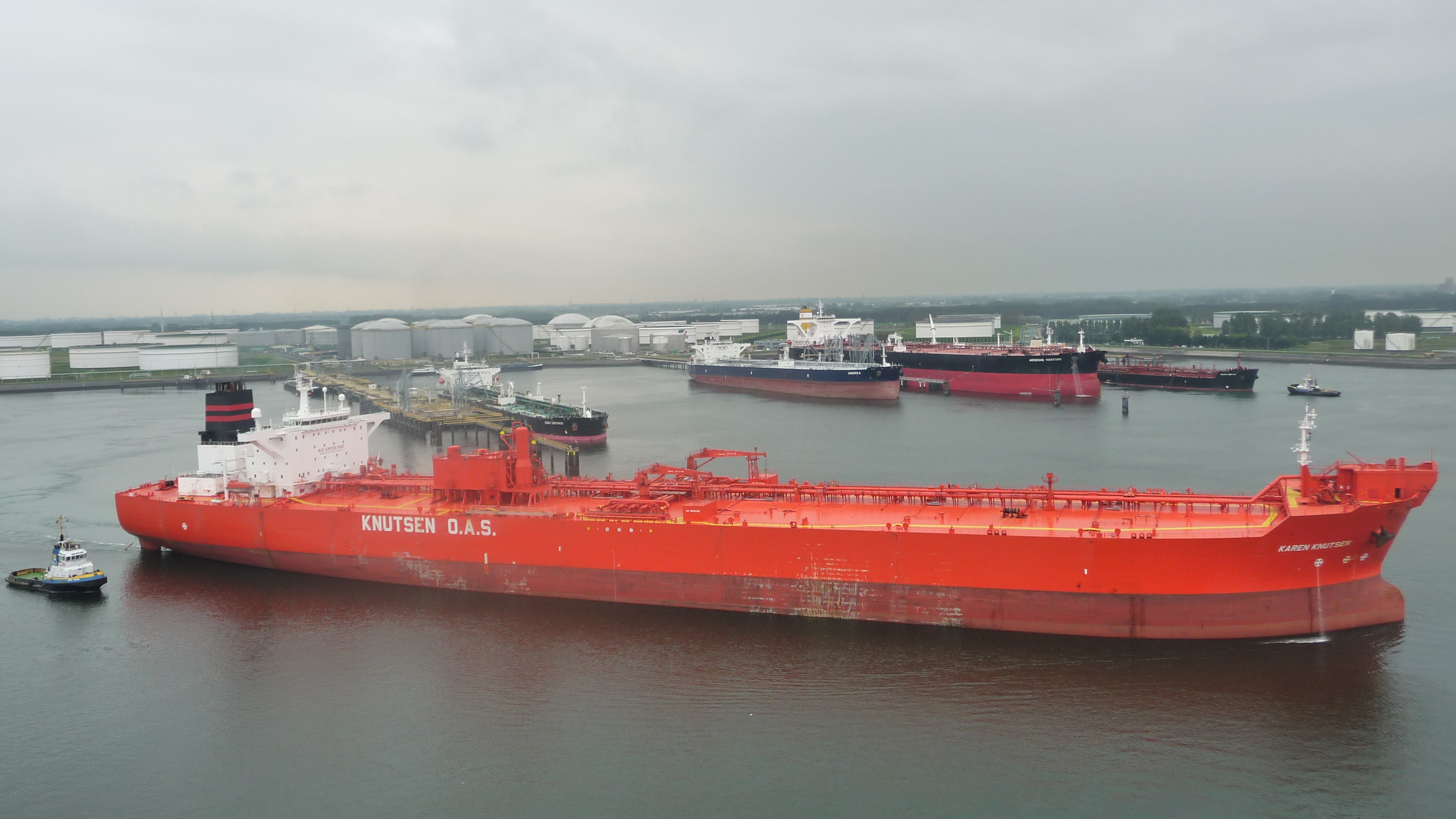
Karen Knutsen in 2010

Karen Knutsen has an overall length of 273.95 metres, an LPP of 264.0 metres, and is 50 metres wide. It has a gross tonnage of 88,109 tons and deadweight of 145,000 tons. This ship can travel at a speed of approximately 14.7 knots. The draught is about 16.02 metres.
