= Knutsen O.A.S. Shipping AS =

Norwegian shipping company

Knutsen OAS
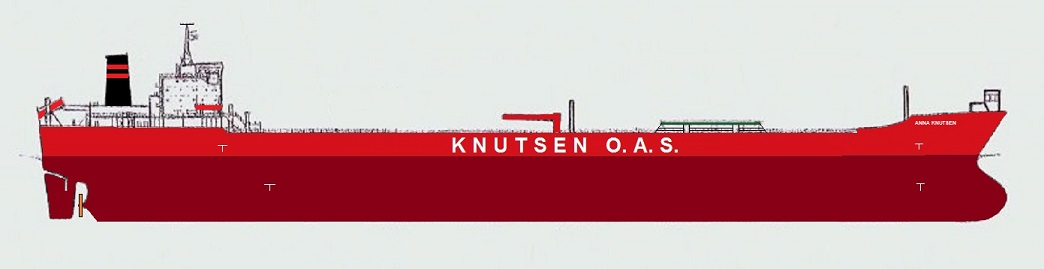
- Type: Public
- Industry: Shipping
- Founded: 1895
- Headquarters: Haugesund, Norway,
- Key people: Trygve Seglem (CEO); Harald Magne Eikesdal (chair)
- Number of employees: 1294 incl land-based organisation and seafarers (2008)
- Website: www.Knutsenoas.com

Knutsen OAS Shipping is a privately owned shipping company located in Haugesund, Norway. The company has a fleet of purpose-built shuttle tankers, chemical carriers and product tankers internationally. The fleet consists of 41 shuttle tankers, chemical carriers and product tankers. In 2009 the company had an onshore staff of 64 to handle projects and operation of the fleet, 430 administrative employees offshore and about 800 foreign employees.

== Structure ==
=== History ===
Knutsen OAS Shipping AS was established in 1895 by Ole Andreas Knutsen. From 1900 to 1946 his son Knut Knutsen established the company as one of the largest shipping companies in Norway. In the 1970s the shuttle-tanker crises created economic difficulties for the company, and it had to restructure. In 1980 Jens Ulltveit Moe became the CEO of the company, and it became a part of the Umoe AS company. After acquiring the assets owned by Jens Ulltveit Moe in 2008, the company's new CEO in 2009 was Trygve Seglem. Its present strategy was implemented in 1984, and based on long-term contracts to first class charters. In 1984, the company got its first offshore loading contract with Statoil for two shuttle tankers. The two new-built ships Anna Knutsen and Ragnhild Knutsen were built in China and delivered in 1987. One common feature or these two pioneer ships and all other shuttle tankers owned by Knutsen OAS is dynamic position systems from the Kongsberg Group. Knutsen OAS operates one of the largest fleets of purpose-built DP-class shuttle tankers in the world. In 2008, the company was listed with 40 ships and 11 ships under construction.

On January 3, 1997, the tanker Tove Knutsen spilled 50 tons of oil in the Humber estuary while discharging at a Conoco monobuoy. The shipping company would be fined £35,000 for the tanker officer's error, which prompted extensive cleanup on Cleethorpes beach.

== Gallery ==
Knutsen OAS Shipping

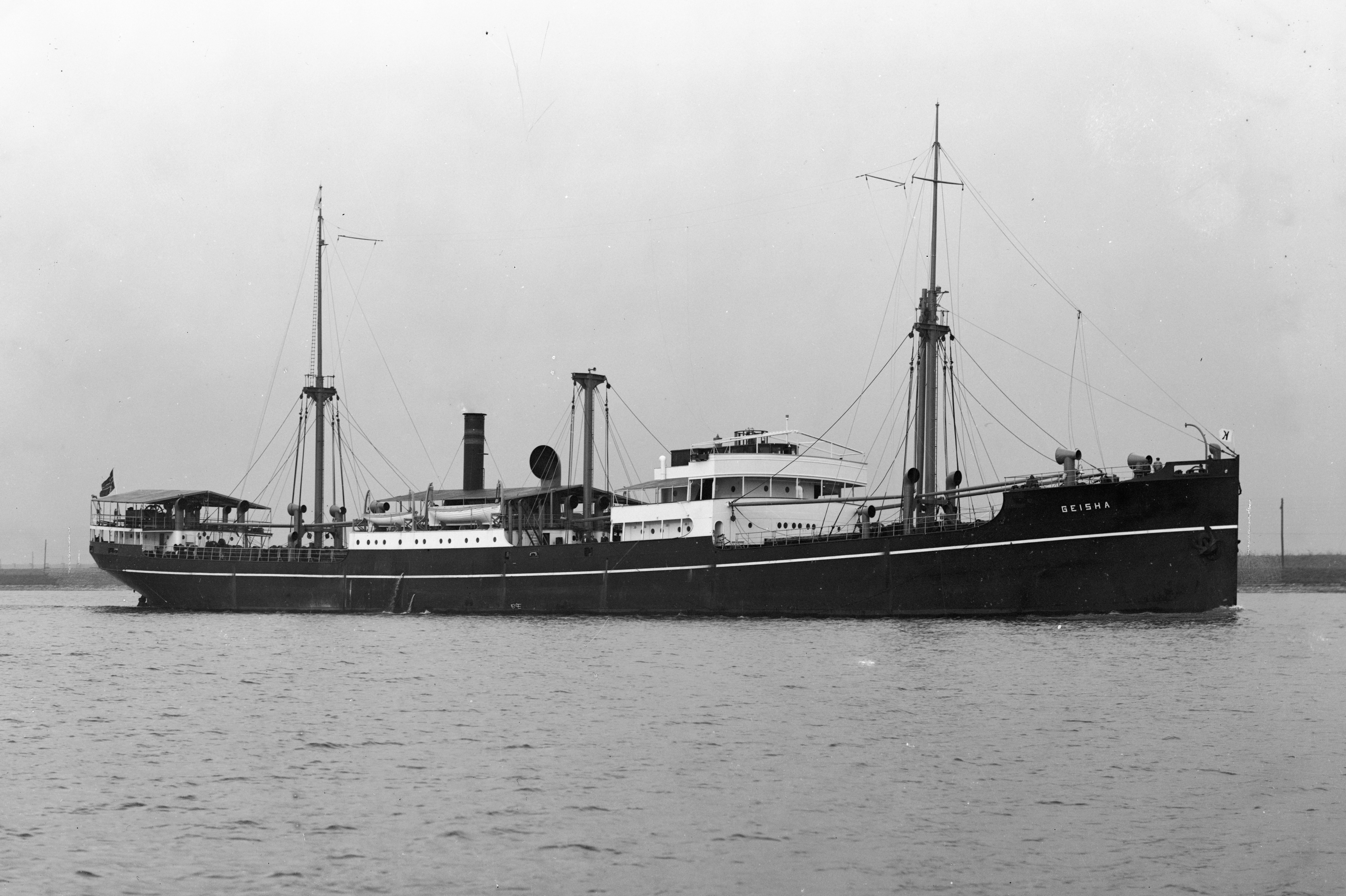
Cargo ship Geisha (1921)

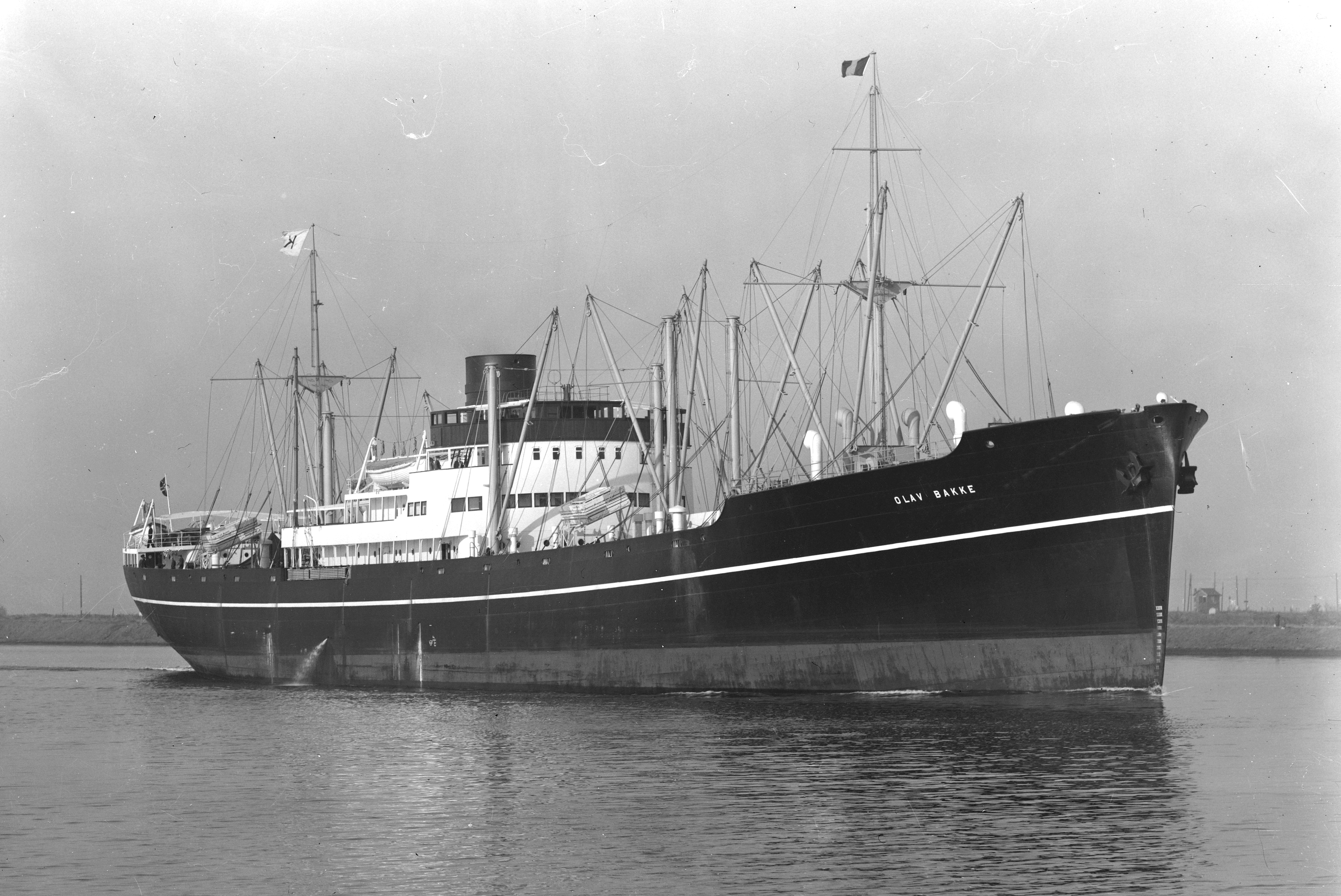
Cargo ship Olav Bakke (1945) in Antwerp

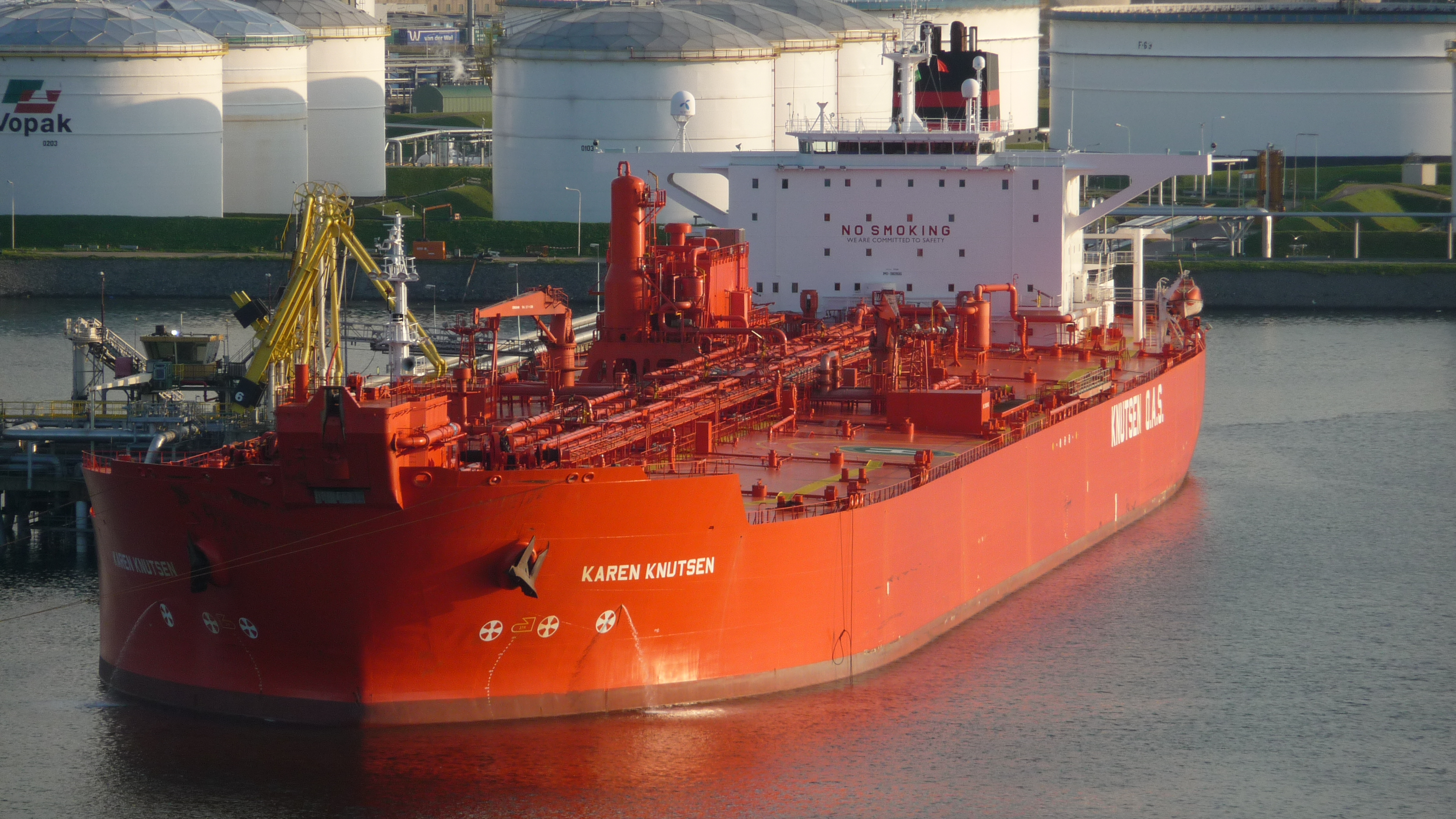
Shuttle tanker Karen Knutsen in the Port of Rotterdam

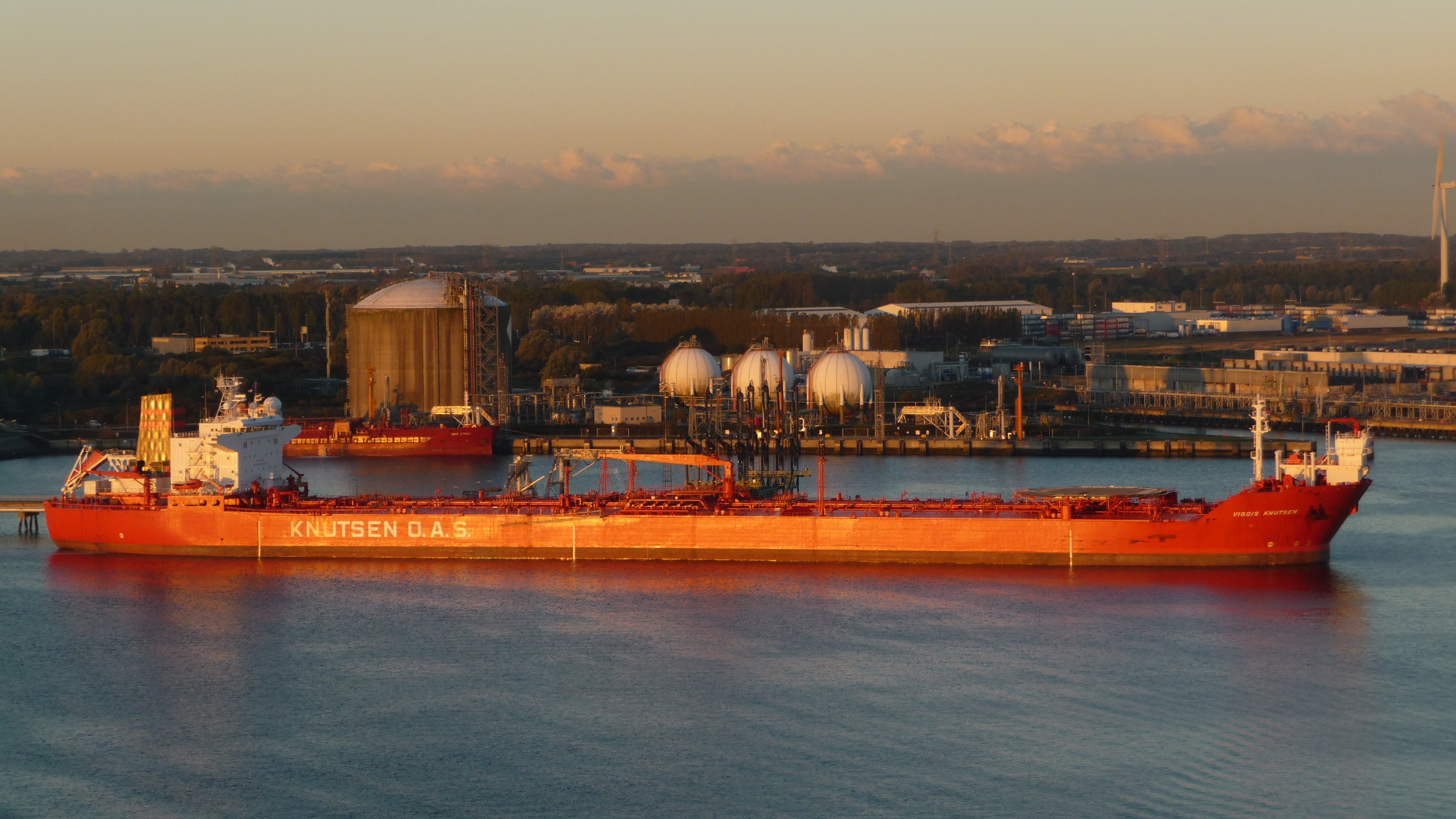
Shuttle tanker Vigdis Knutsen

=== The fleet (per 2009) ===
==== Gas tankers ====
Name	Gross	Mdwt	Built	Flag
Bilbao Knutsen	93450	68200	2004	SPA
Cadiz Knutsen	93450	68200	2004	SPA
Iberica Knutsen	93915	77541	2006	NIS
Pioneer Knutsen	1687	817	2004	NOR
Sestao Knutsen	93450	68200	2007	SPA
La Mancha Knutsen	9721724	116246	2016	SPA
Rioja Knutsen	9721736	116246	2016	SPA
brandy ban-eg Knutsen	963700	116246	2026	PH

==== Offshore ====
Name	Gross	Mdwt	Built	Flag
Jorunn Knutsen	72651	122996	2000	NOR

==== Tank ====
Name	Gross	Mdwt	Built	Flag
Anna Knutsen	69303	123819	1987	NIS
Anneleen Knutsen	24242	35140	2002	NIS
Betty Knutsen	24185	35309	1999	NIS
Catherine Knutsen	77389	141720	1992	NIS
Eli Knutsen	11889	16544	2009	BRI
Elisabeth Knutsen	71850	124768	1997	MAN
Ellen Knutsen	11433	17071	1991	NIS
Evi Knutsen	72120	146230	1988	NIS
Gerd Knutsen	79592	146273	1996	MAN
Heather Knutsen	80918	148643	2005	CAN
Helene Knutsen	11737	14850	1992	MAN
Hilda Knutsen	11425	14390	1989	NIS
Isabel Knutsen	13753	22110	2001	BRI
Jasmine Knutsen	80918	148643	2005	CAN
Jorunn Knutsen	72651	122996	2000	NOR
Karen Knutsen	88109	153617	1999	MAN
Kristin Knutsen	12184	19110	1998	NIS
Liv Knutsen	11889	16585	2009	BRI
Loch Knutsen	75526	130031	1998	BRI
Maria Knutsen	13753	22110	2001	BRI
Nancy Knutsen	51161	95468	1993	NIS
Pascale Knutsen	11688	14730	1993	BRI
Sallie Knutsen	87827	153617	1999	MAN
Sidsel Knutsen	15806	22625	1993	NIS
Siri Knutsen	24185	35309	2004	BRI
Synnøve Knutsen	11433	17071	1992	NIS
Tordis Knutsen	66671	123848	1993	MAN
Torill Knutsen	11425	14910	1990	NIS
Tove Knutsen	61206	105295	1989	NIS
Turid Knutsen	15687	21999	1993	NIS
Vigdis Knutsen	66671	123423	1993	MAN
Windsor Knutsen	87146	162000	2007	NIS

=== Innovation & technology focus ===
The Knutsen OAS tanker segment is within the following areas:

• Offshore loading and crude oil transport • Products • Chemicals • Liquefied natural gas (LNG)

Knutsen OAS has since the mid-1980s grown into one of the leading shipping companies within offshore oil loading. Another increasing focus for Knutsen O.A.S is the transport of natural gas. From 2004 to 2007, 5 LNG ships were delivered and this is a segment where the company has ambitions for further expansions.

=== Knutsen VOC technology ===
This technology is a cost efficient method to reduce and limit VOC emissions during transport and loading of volatile cargoes such as crude oil. This technology limits the VOC emissions between 60 and 80% during transport and loading. In addition to reducing air emissions and, the Knutsen VOC technology reduces H2S emission from the cargo. This emission represents a hazard to the environment, the ship and also to the crews' health.

=== Pressurized natural gas transport ===
Pressurized natural gas (PNG) is a solution for maritime transport of natural gas. This technology has been developed in collaboration with Europipe GMBH (Germany) and Det Norske Veritas (Norway). In the start up of development, this technology encountered some problems due to previous pipeline regulations, but in 2003 when new regulations were in place the project received authorization.

This new technology opens for new transport alternatives especially suitable for offshore loading for direct transport to the market. These technology stores gas on board the ship in specially designed cylinders at a pressure of 250 barg. In comparison to LNG maritime transport, the gas treatment is minimal and comparable to treatment required for pipeline transport. The reduction in energy recourses required to compress the gas makes is a more environmental friendly solution than LNG.
