= Project 10510 icebreaker =

Planned series of Russian nuclear-powered icebreakers

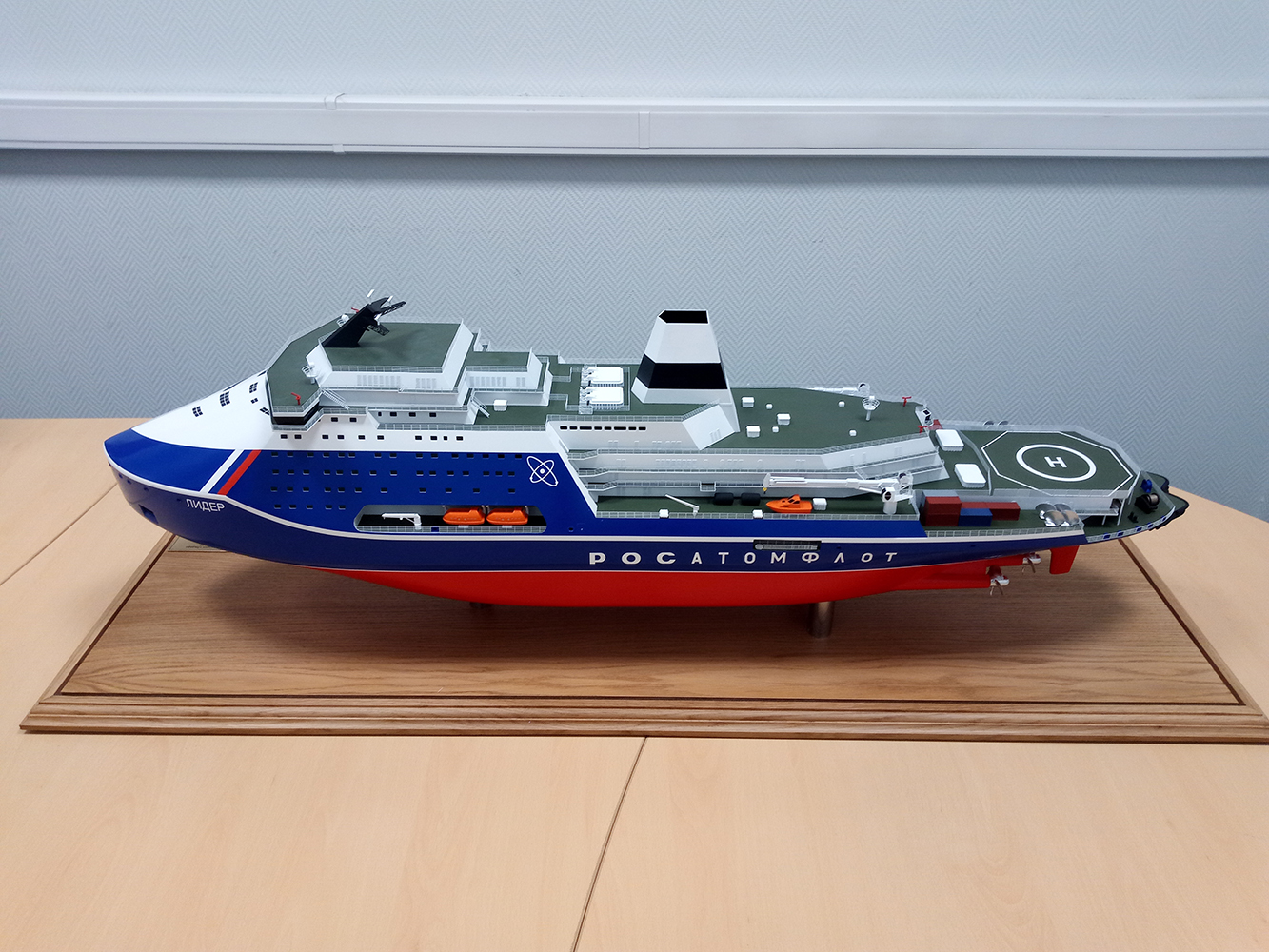
- Scale model presented by Rosatom

Class overview
- Builders: Zvezda shipyard
- Operators: FSUE Atomflot (planned)
- Preceded by: Project 22220
- Cost: RUB 125.57 billion (Note: About US$2 billion or 1.85 billion euro.)
- Built: 2020–
- In service: 2027 (original plan); 2030 (current estimate)
- Planned: 1
- Building: 1

General characteristics
- Type: Icebreaker
- Displacement: 69,700 tonnes (68,600 long tons)
- Length: 209 m (686 ft)
- Beam: 47.7 m (156 ft)
- Draft: 13 m (43 ft)
- Depth: 20.3 m (67 ft)
- Installed power: Two RITM-400 nuclear reactors (2 × 315 MWt); Four turbogenerators (4 × 37 MWe)
- Propulsion: Nuclear-turbo-electric; Four shafts (4 × 30 MW)
- Speed: 24 knots (44 km/h; 28 mph)
- Endurance: 8 months
- Crew: 127

Project 10510, also known through the Russian type size series designations LK-110Ya and LK-120Ya (Note: The type size series designation "LK-110Ya" (Russian: ЛК-110Я) and "LK-120Ya" (Russian: ЛК-120Я) comes from the Russian language word for "icebreaker" (Russian: ледокол, romanized: ledokol), propulsion power (110 or 120 megawatts), and the first letter of the Russian word for "nuclear" (Russian: ядерное, romanized: yadernoye).) or the project name Leader (Russian: Лидер, romanized: Lider), is a planned series of Russian nuclear-powered icebreakers. Designed in the 2010s, when built in the 2020s, it would supersede Project 22220 icebreakers as the largest and most powerful icebreakers in the world.

As of 2024, the lead ship of the series is under construction and expected to be commissioned by 2030, three years after the original planned delivery in 2027. Initially there were plans to build two additional sister ships by 2033, but in February 2023 it was reported that only one Project 10510 ship would be built before 2035.

== Background and development ==
In the late 1980s, Central Marine Research and Design Institute (CNIIMF) and the Central Design Bureau "Iceberg" developed a number of "icebreaker type size series" for a long-term fleet renewal program initiated shortly after the dissolution of the Soviet Union. In addition to smaller diesel-electric icebreakers, the proposed icebreaking ships included two distinct nuclear-powered icebreaker designs: a 60-megawatt dual-draft line icebreaker and a 110-megawatt "leader-icebreaker". The latter's primary mission would be to ensure reliable year-round shipping in the Russian Arctic, including transit cargo along the Northern Sea Route as well as transportation of raw materials and natural resources produced from the continental shelf. As traditional icebreaker-led convoys were seen preferable over independently-operating ships, the principal characteristics such as a beam of 40–42 metres (131–138 ft) and capability of breaking up to 3.5 metres (11 ft) thick ice were specified with escorting of large-tonnage ships in mind.

In the late 2000s, increasing shipping activity in the Russian Arctic and the prospect of turning the Northern Sea Route into a year-round shortcut between Western Europe and Asia called for the development of more powerful icebreakers. The 110-megawatt icebreaker, now referred to simply as "Leader" (or "Lider" as romanized from the Russian word Лидер), was seen as the key for ensuring that large container ships could transit the northern passage in just ten days.

In September 2011, then Prime Minister Vladimir Putin mentioned the construction of 110-megawatt nuclear-powered icebreakers "here in the northwestern shipyards in Russia" in his speech at the interregional conference of United Russia in Cherepovets. Shortly afterwards, Krylov State Research Center began developing the ship concept in co-operation with Central Design Bureau "Iceberg". The result, Project 10510, was a nuclear-powered icebreaker design intended for escorting cargo ships and tankers with a beam of 50 metres (160 ft) and deadweight tonnage of 100,000 tonnes year-round along the entire Northern Sea Route. With a propulsion power of 120 megawatts, the icebreaker would be capable of maintaining an average escort speed of 10–11 knots (19–20 km/h; 12–13 mph) in 2-metre (6.6 ft) ice.

While the Saint Petersburg-based Baltic Shipyard, builder of the preceding Arktika class and the Project 22220 icebreakers, declared itself as the only Russian shipyard with the necessary competence to construct nuclear-powered icebreakers, the newly constructed shipbuilding complex "Zvezda" in Bolshoy Kamen in the Russian Far East was also seen as a serious contender. However, proposals to build the ship at Zaliv Shipbuilding Yard in Kerch in the Russian-annexed Crimea were largely dismissed. In September 2018, Zvezda was officially selected as the sole builder of the Project 10510 icebreakers. In February 2019, CEO of Zvezda, Sergei Tseluyko, confirmed during an interview with TASS that the plan is to build three Project 10510 icebreakers at the shipyard.

On 15 January 2020, shortly before resigning, then Prime Minister Dmitry Medvedev signed a governmental order allocating 125.57 billion rubles of federal money for financing the construction of the first Project 10510 icebreaker for Rosatom from 2020 onwards and commissioning it by 2027. Previously, the funding for the construction of the icebreaker had been excluded from the 2017–2025 state program for the development of the Arctic as funding had been cut from 209.7 billion to 50.9 billion rubles.

On 23 April 2020, Atomflot and Zvezda signed the shipbuilding contract for the construction of the first Project 10510 icebreaker.

In February 2023, it was reported that an update of Russia's Arctic strategy provided for only one Project 10510 ship to be built before 2035. The emphasis will instead shift to two additional Project 22220 icebreakers.

== Construction ==
The steel cutting for the first Project 10510 icebreaker began at Zvezda on 6 July 2020. The ship will be named Rossiya, a name previously given to the third Arktika-class icebreaker that was in service in 1985–2013. It was laid down on 5 July 2021.

In March 2023, Kommersant reported that the construction of Rossiya's hull had progressed only by 5% instead of the planned 15% and the large steel castings such as rudder horns and propeller shaft brackets, originally ordered from the Ukrainian company Energomashspetsstal whose production facilities in Kramatorsk were damaged during the Russo-Ukrainian war, had to be re-contracted to a domestic supplier who cannot deliver them to the shipyard before August 2025. As a result of various delays and challenges, the cost of the first Project 10510 icebreaker is expected to increase by 40–60% and the delivery of the ship will slip beyond the December 2027 deadline. In May 2024, the First Deputy Prime Minister of Russia, Denis Manturov, confirmed that the delivery has been postponed to 2030.

In December 2024, the Russian cargo ship Ursa Major, transporting two 45-ton hatches for the nuclear reactors of Rossiya sank in the western Mediterranean.

In May 2025, the first RITM-400 was manufactured.

== Design ==
=== General characteristics ===
Project 10510 icebreakers are 209 metres (686 ft) long and have a beam of 47.7 metres (156 ft). They draw 13 metres (43 ft) of water and have a displacement of about 69,700 tonnes (68,600 long tons).

In 2015, students from the Saint Petersburg Art and Industry Academy collaborated with Central Design Bureau "Iceberg" to develop futuristic visions on what the next-generation nuclear-powered icebreaker could look like. While these sleek yacht-like design studies have been sometimes incorrectly thought to represent the actual Project 10510 icebreaker design, the actual design is a departure from the more angular previous nuclear icebreakers.

=== Power and propulsion ===
The icebreakers are powered by two RITM-400 nuclear reactors with a thermal output of 315 megawatts each. Four electrically driven shafts with a combined capacity of 120 megawatts (161,000 hp) allow the ship to break up to 4-metre-thick (13 ft) ice.

== Ships in class ==
Name	Yard number	IMO number	Laid down	Launched	Commissioned	Status
Rossiya	056	9911238	5 July 2021		2027 (original plan); 2030 (current estimate)	Under construction
		9945930				Cancelled or delayed until after 2035
		9945942				Cancelled or delayed until after 2035
