= Manhattan (ship) =

Manhattan may refer to one of several ships:

- Manhattan (1843 ship), ship that made the first authorized United States visit to Tokyo Bay
- SS Manhattan (1931), a 1930s luxury liner
- SS Manhattan (1961), tanker constructed to pass the Northwest Passage

For other US ships of that name, see USS Manhattan.
