= International Code for Ships Operating in Polar Waters =

The International Code for Ships Operating in Polar Waters or Polar Code is an international regime adopted by the International Maritime Organization (IMO) in 2014. The Code sets out regulations for shipping in the polar regions, principally relating to ice navigation and ship design. The international framework aims to protect the two polar regions — the Arctic (north pole region) and Antarctic (south pole region), from maritime risks. The Code entered into force on 1 January 2017.

== Background ==
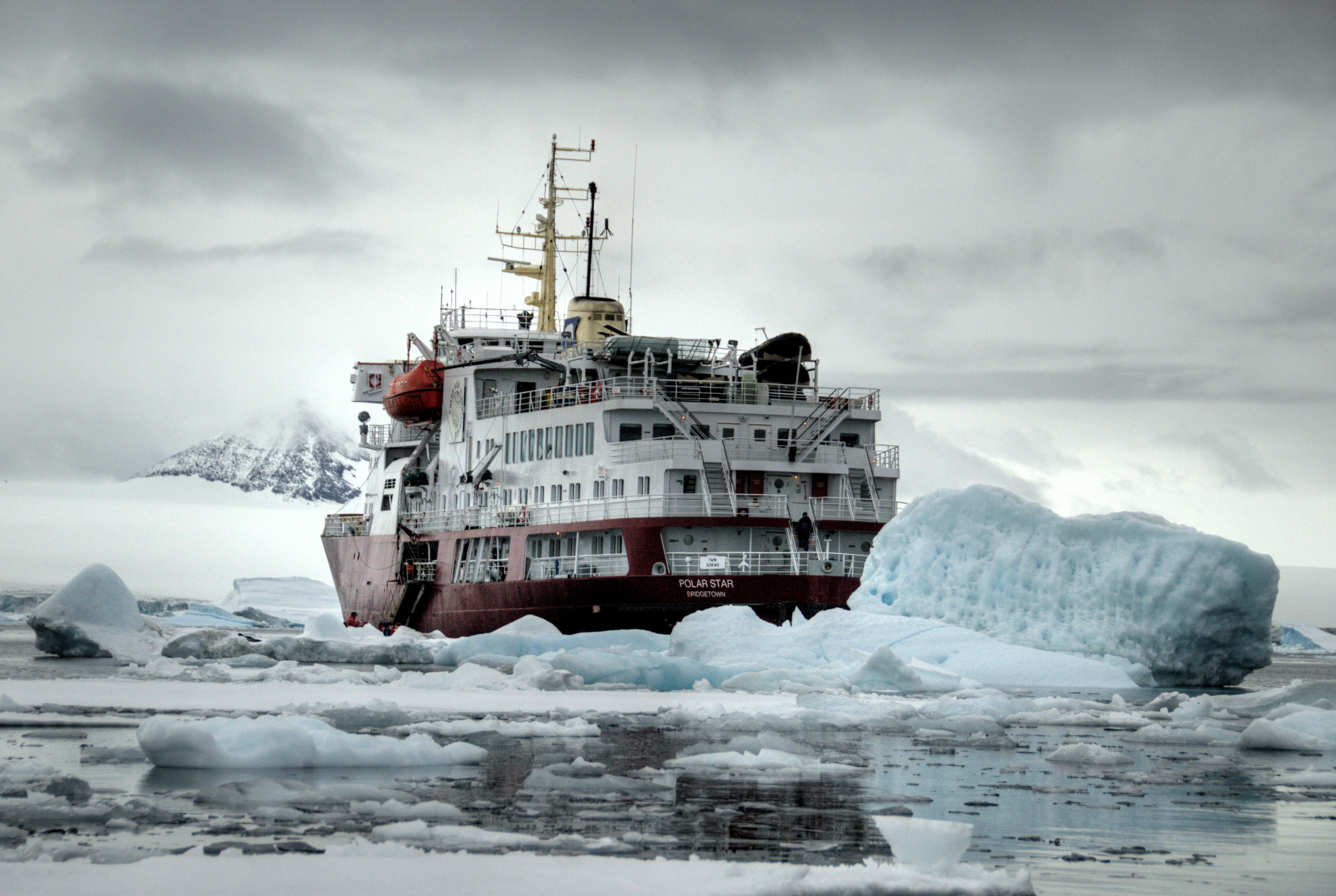
The Polar Code applies to ships operating in Polar Waters

The Polar Code stems from previous IMO documents, including voluntary guidelines in both 2002 and 2010. As part of ongoing international work on the Polar Code, an IMO Workshop on the code's Environmental Aspects was held in Cambridge, United Kingdom, in September 2011. The report and some of the presentations from the workshop can be found on the IMO's website. In February 2012, the IMO's Marine Safety Committee ("MSC") released a report detailing progress on the Polar Code. As of 2012, the MSC "decided to keep any decision on environmental requirements to be included in the Code in abeyance, pending further consideration at DE 57 [2013]. However, agreement was subsequently reached and in November 2014, the Polar Code was approved by the MSC of the IMO and in May 2016, it was approved by the Marine Environment Protection Committee of the IMO. The Code entered into force on 1 January 2017.

== Scope of subject matter ==
The Polar Code is enforced through incorporation in existing treaties that encompass safety (International Convention for the Safety of Life at Sea or "SOLAS") and environmental protections (the International Convention for the Prevention of Pollution From Ships or "MARPOL"). Specifically, the Polar Code includes mandatory provisions covering safety measures (part I-A) and pollution prevention measures (part II-A) and additional guidance regarding the provisions for both (parts I-B and II-B). The Code assigns three categories for ships depending on the operational conditions that the ship will face: Category A for ships designed to operate in polar waters with at least medium first-year ice (0.7 to 1.2 metres (28 to 47 in) thick), which may include old (multi-year) ice inclusions; Category B for ships not included in Category A and designed for operation in polar waters in at least thin first-year ice (0.3 to 0.7 metres (12 to 28 in) thick), which may include old ice inclusions; and Category C for ships designed to operate in open water or in ice conditions less severe than those included in categories A and B.

The International Maritime Organization (IMO) developed the Polar Code, to cover the full range of design, construction, equipment, operational, training, search and rescue and environmental protection matters relevant to ships operating in the inhospitable waters surrounding the two poles. To cover these areas, the Code focuses on managing the hazards of Polar Waters through the use of "design goals and functional requirements." For example, to ensure procedures for operations, including procedures for use of icebreakers, ships are required to possess a Polar Water Operational Manual (PWOM), as per Chapter 2 of the Code.

The Code is not mandatory for ships less than 500 GT, fishing vessels or those entitled to sovereign immunity. Many environmental protections are already effective in Antarctica and not yet in effect in the Arctic. For example, A new regulation from MARPOL now protects the Antarctic from pollution by heavy grade oils. This measure was adopted by the Marine Environment Protection Committee (MEPC), at its 60th session in March, 2010. The measure entered into force on 1 August 2011. However, this regulation does not apply to Arctic ship operations.

== Recent progress ==
On December 22, 2016 the Russian shuttle tanker Shturman Albanov became the first ship to be certified in compliance with the Polar Code.

== Criticism ==
Many industry bodies and environmental groups termed the final draft Polar code of 2014 as "too weak" and "diluted". The pollution restrictions in the arctic waters are even more lax than those in the Mediterranean Sea, allowing ships to throw food waste overboard in arctic waters 12 nautical miles (22 km; 14 mi) from ice. The structural requirements too were found lax: for instance, being ice classed is not a requirements for ships making one arctic passage. Polar certification does not require a physical separate survey and the Polar Code allows this to be simply sent by email.

The Polar Code does not address whole groups of vessels, as well as many known issues. Fishing vessels and those less than 500 GT do not need to comply with the Code. Air pollution and greenhouse gasses are not mentioned in the Polar Code. There are recommendations about ballast water management and anti-fouling paint which leave the choice to comply or not to the individual vessel.

== Bibliography ==
- The Ice Navigation Manual (2019). Witherby Publishing Group. ISBN 9781856098335.
- The Polar Code (2016) International Maritime Organization. ISBN 9789280116281
