= Ice navigation =

Specialist area of navigation

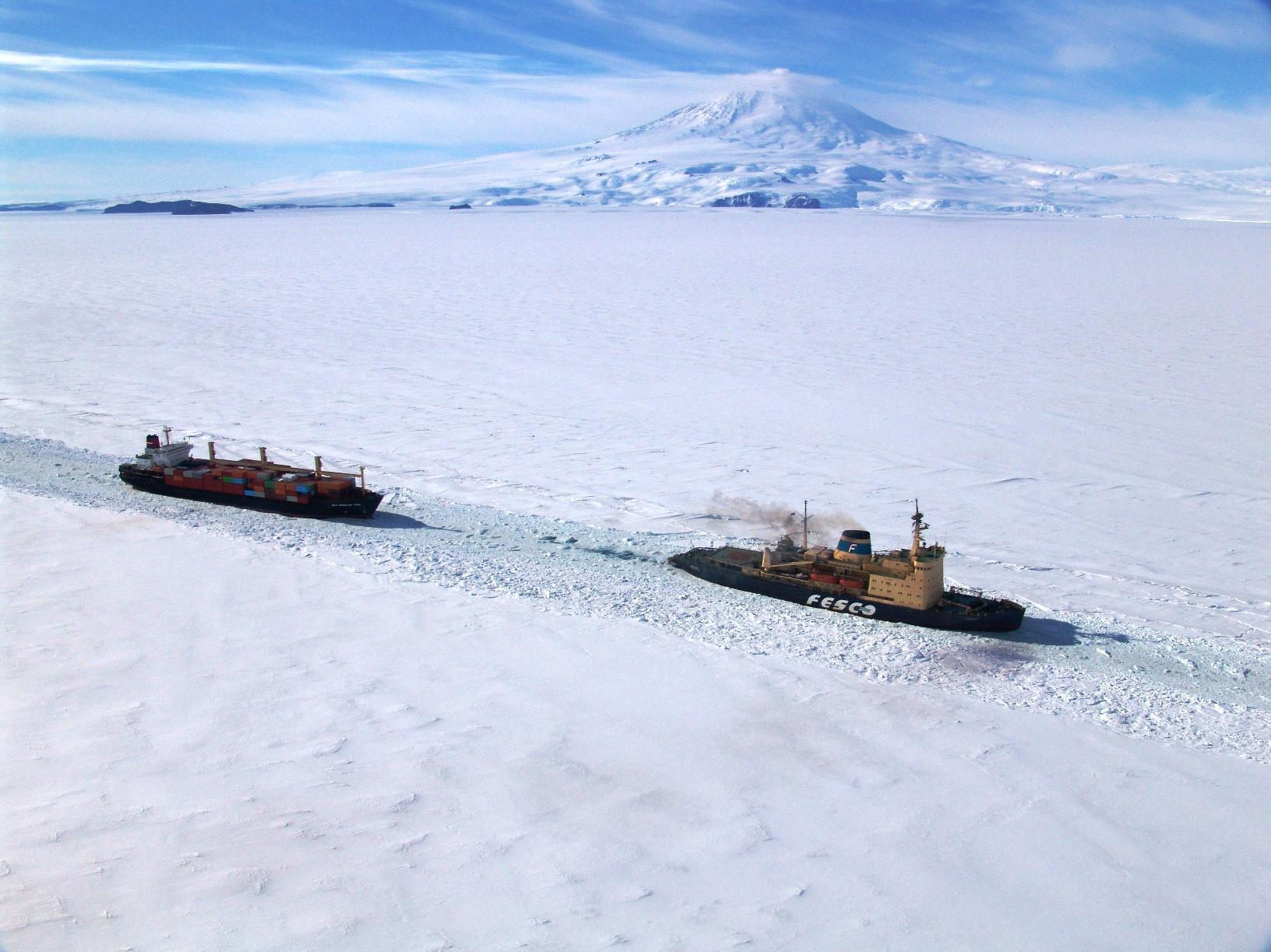
An example of ice navigation; Russian icebreaker Krasin leading an American supply ship into McMurdo Station, Antarctica

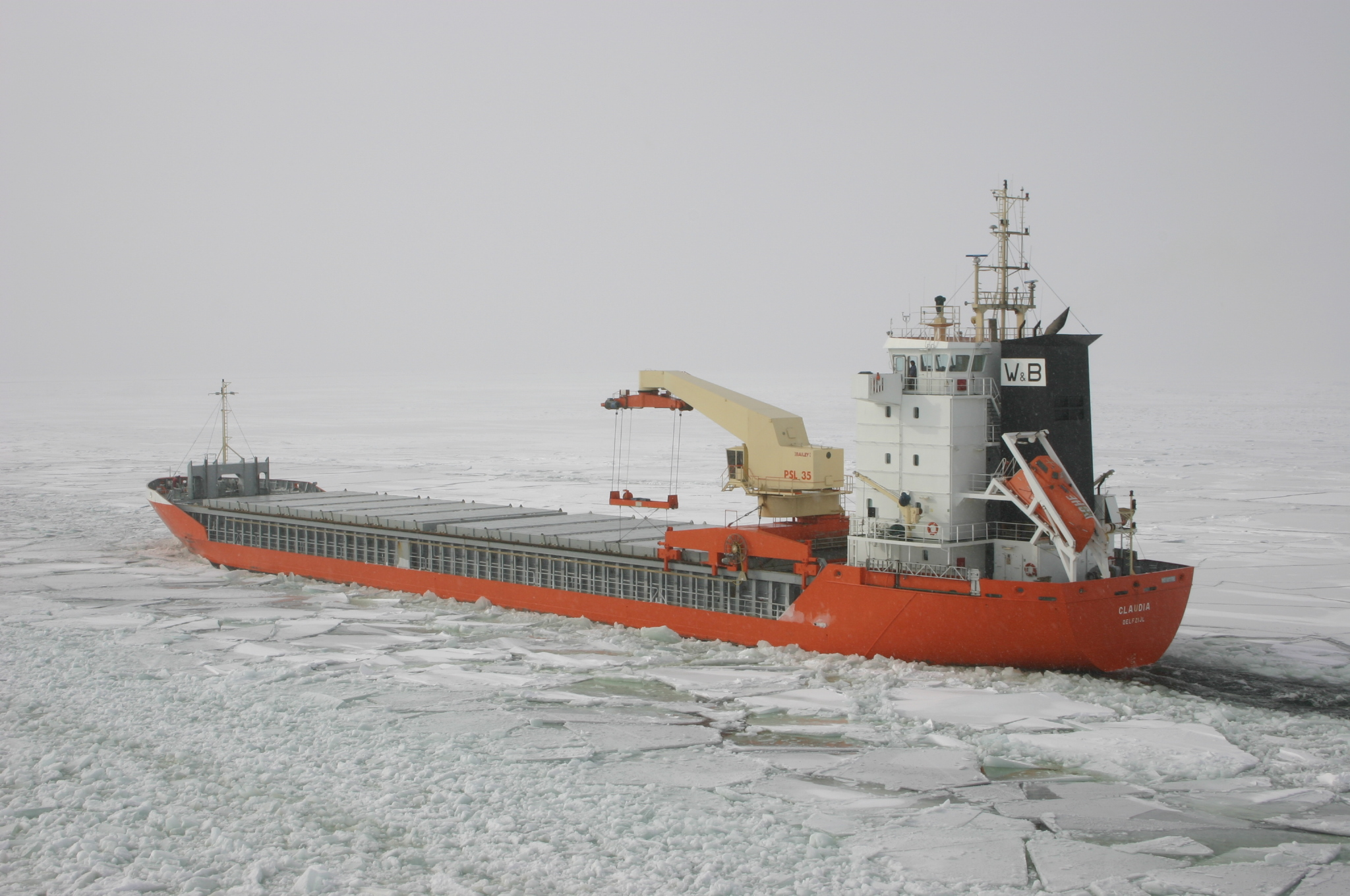
Cargo vessel Claudia navigating in ice, Gulf of Bothnia

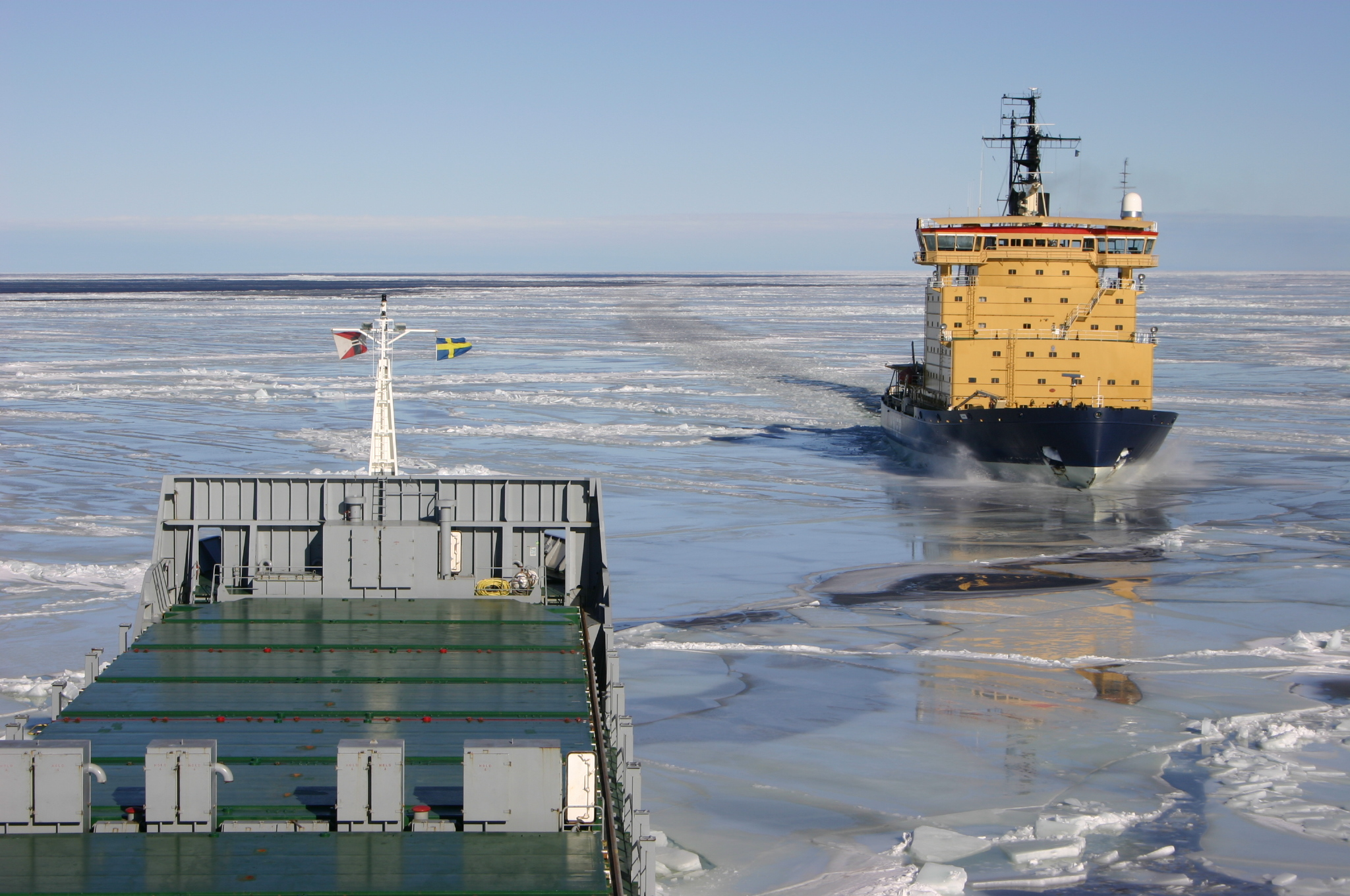
Icebreaker Ymer assisting cargovessel Vlieborg

Ice navigation is a specialist area of navigation involving the use of maritime skills to determine and monitor the position of ships in cold waters, where ice is a hazard to the safety of navigation. Transportation in the Arctic is faced with particular risk factors that include extremely low temperatures and drifting ice. The presence of sea ice requires a ship to exercise caution, for example by avoiding icebergs, slowly sailing through a lead, or by working with an icebreaker to follow a course through the ice to a destination. Additionally ships must also deal with the extreme cold of the climate in regions such as the poles; this involves removal of ice accumulation from the ship, as well as protecting the crew from the elements while working on the deck. Ships and their crews operating in ice will follow established rules of seamanship, as well as complying with national and international regulations such as the Polar Code.

Ice strengthened vessels are typically used for navigation in ice regions, where additional hull strengthening and other design elements ensure operation in areas of high ice concentration.

== Areas of ice navigation ==
Ice navigation occurs wherever a waterborne vessel transits through sea ice. One of the more common regions for ice navigation is the Baltic Sea, where vessels visiting the Baltic States will make their way through first year ice in the winter months, often with an icebreaker, or with ice reports, charts and data provided by meteorological offices. Other areas include the Arctic Ocean, where increasing numbers of ships are transiting the region in the summer months for cruising and to transport cargo, as a result of oil and gas extraction in areas such as Yamal. The problems of increased shipping in polar regions presents additional challenges, including maritime safety concerns in the event that ice navigation is not carried out carefully. Ships will also pass through ice when navigating in the Antarctic, although most ships are either research vessels or cruise ships that have been especially ice strengthened. Other significant maritime regions where ships will navigate through Ice include the Saint Lawrence Seaway, around Greenland and the Canadian coast, the North Atlantic during iceberg season and through the Northwest Passage.

== Icing of superstructure ==
The accumulation of ice on the superstructure is a dangerous phenomenon. When the temperature is below −2.2 °C (28.0 °F) slight icing will occur at winds of 5 Bft, moderate icing at 7 Bft, and severe icing at 8 Bft. When sailing in fresh water, icing will occur from 0 °C (32 °F) and below. The more common causes of ice formation on the superstructure are from spray by wave crests and ship-generated spray. Other possibilities are snow fall, sea fog, a drastic fall in ambient temperature and also freezing raindrops in contact with the cold steel. The heading of the vessel relative to the wind and seas will determine which parts of the superstructure will ice first. Icing can immobilise equipment such as anchors or cause a dangerous list if the windward side of the vessel ices more heavily.

== Ice detection by radar ==
A radar can be useful in detecting ice, but the returning signal which bounces off ice (even icebergs) is very faint, much lower than from ships. Conventional marine radars are designed for target detection and avoidance. Enhanced marine radars provide a higher definition image of the ice that the vessel is transmitting and will result in a much clearer image. This image can be used to identify the quantity and sort of ice that has to be dealt with. In standard radar, sea clutter affects the ability to see in the near vicinity of the vessel. An X-band radar set to a short pulse can give improved results.

== See also ==
- Ice navigation vessel

== Bibliography ==
- The Ice Navigation and Seamanship Handbook (2019). BIMCO and Witherby Publishing Group. ISBN 9781856098335.
