= Pneumatic anti-ice system =

Icebreaker technology

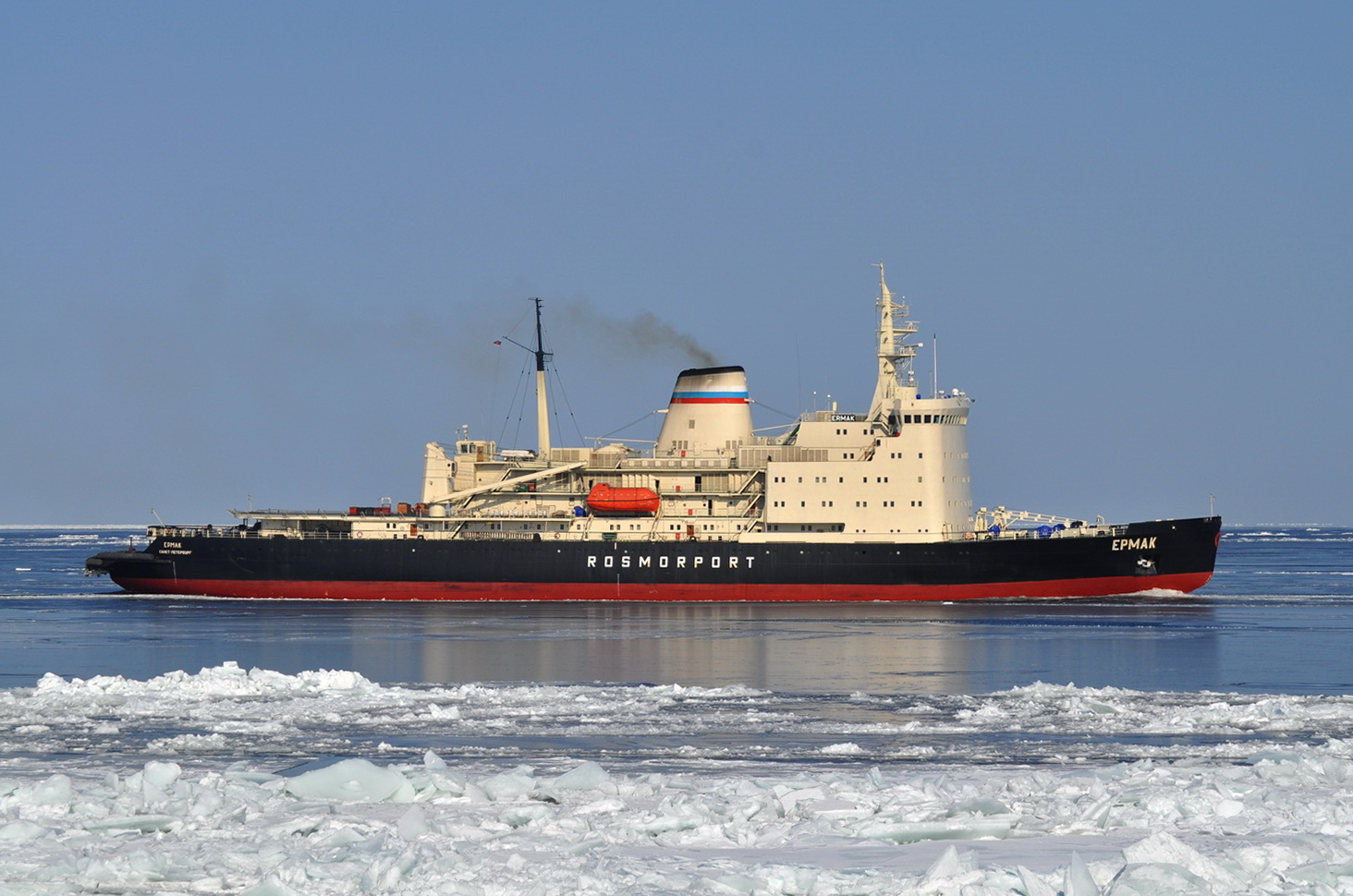
Yermak, the world's first icebreaker with a pneumatic anti-icing system.

A pneumatic anti-ice system is a technology that uses air or another gas to prevent ice buildup on ships sailing in icy waters. It is housed below the waterline on the ship's hull. Pneumatic anti-ice systems use compressed air or engine exhaust as the working gas, which is vented overboard through a series of ejectors from bow to amidships. Since the ejectors are located below the waterline or near the keel, the airflow streaming from them forms a water/air curtain along the hull.

== History ==
The concept of a ship anti-icing system in the form of a water-air boundary layer was introduced in 1966 in the USSR. Variants of a heated steam-air system in the waterline area were considered, and the prospects for its use as a thruster to increase maneuverability were studied. The modern form was proposed by Wärtsilä in 1969 and was first installed on Finnish cargo ferry Finncarrier. It was tested in the Baltic Sea in 1970. The first icebreaker on which the pneumatic anti-ice system was installed was the Yermak, built in 1974.

== Performance ==
The adhesion of ice to the hull has thermal and electrostatic aspects. The ongoing processes develop too quickly to warm above-the-waterline ice to the ambient water temperature, as a result of which it freezes or sticks to the hull. Air flushing reduces the contact area of the ice with the hull and increases the temperature by creating an upstream current of warmer water at greater depth, thereby solving the first problem. Another mechanism is the accumulation of an electrostatic charge in the ice when it cracks and breaks. When the state of underwater paint coating of the hull is unsatisfactory, it can become ineffective against preventing ice from sticking.
