= Yamalmax =

Russian class of ice-breaking LNG carriers

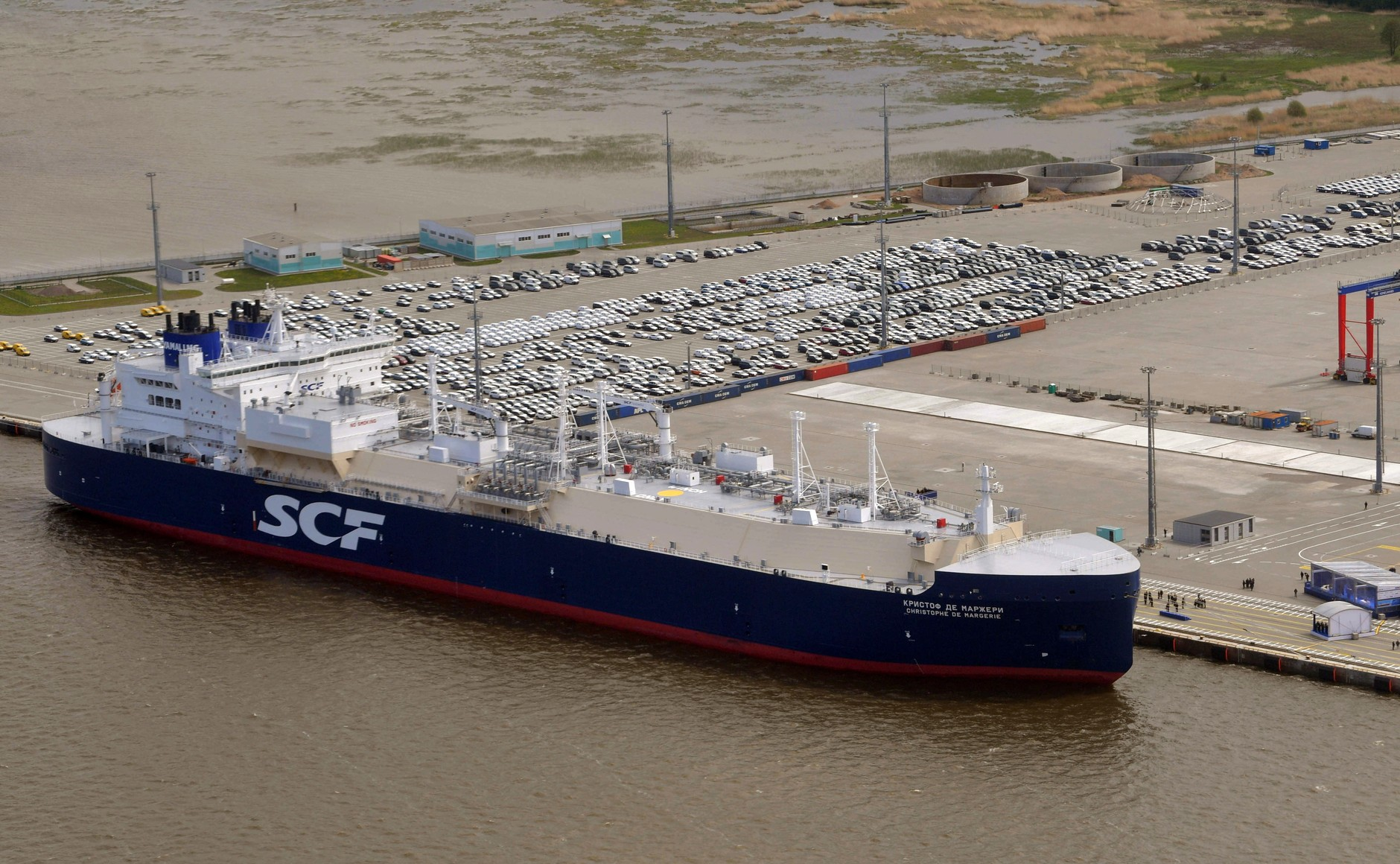
- Christophe de Margerie, LNG-tanker of type Yamalmax

Class overview
- Builders: Daewoo Shipbuilding
- Operators: Sovcomflot, Teekay, Dynagas, MOL
- Built: 2016–2019
- In service: 2016–present
- Completed: 15
- Active: 15

General characteristics
- Type: Ice navigation LNG tanker
- Tonnage: 128,806 GT
- Length: 299 m (981 ft)
- Beam: 50.13 m (164.5 ft)
- Height: 26.5 m (87 ft)
- Draught: 13 m (43 ft)
- Ice class: Arc7
- Installed power: LNG "Dual-Fuel" Diesel-Electric
- Propulsion: Three azipods (3 × 15 MW)
- Speed: 19.5 knots (36.1 km/h; 22.4 mph) (ice-free water); 5.5 knots (10.2 km/h; 6.3 mph) (1.5 m (4.9 ft) ice, astern)

Yamalmax is a class of ice navigation tankers for the transportation of LNG with maximum dimensions that allow passing through the approach channel of the port of Sabetta located on the Yamal Peninsula (channel width 295 m (968 ft), depth 15.1 m (50 ft)). The project was developed by the Finnish company Aker Arctic by order of Sovcomflot.

Vessels correspond to the ice class Arc7, which is independent navigation in close-packed first-year Arctic ice with their thickness up to 1.4 metres (4.6 ft) in winter-spring navigation, and up to 1.7 metres (5.6 ft) in summer-autumn with occasional overcoming of ice barriers by raids. Navigation in the channel behind the icebreaker in annual Arctic ice up to 2.0 metres (6.6 ft) thick in winter-spring and up to 3.2 metres (10 ft) in summer-autumn navigation.

By design, gas carriers of the Yamalmax class are classified as double acting ships - the bow is adapted for navigation in open water and in thin ice conditions, and the stern is optimized for independent navigation in difficult ice conditions. Constant power regardless of the direction of movement is achieved by using the Azipod propellers produced by the Swedish-Swiss company ABB. Each Yamalmax ship is equipped with three rudder propellers with a total capacity of 45 MW.

== See also ==
- Yamal LNG
