= Shuttle tanker =

Type of ship

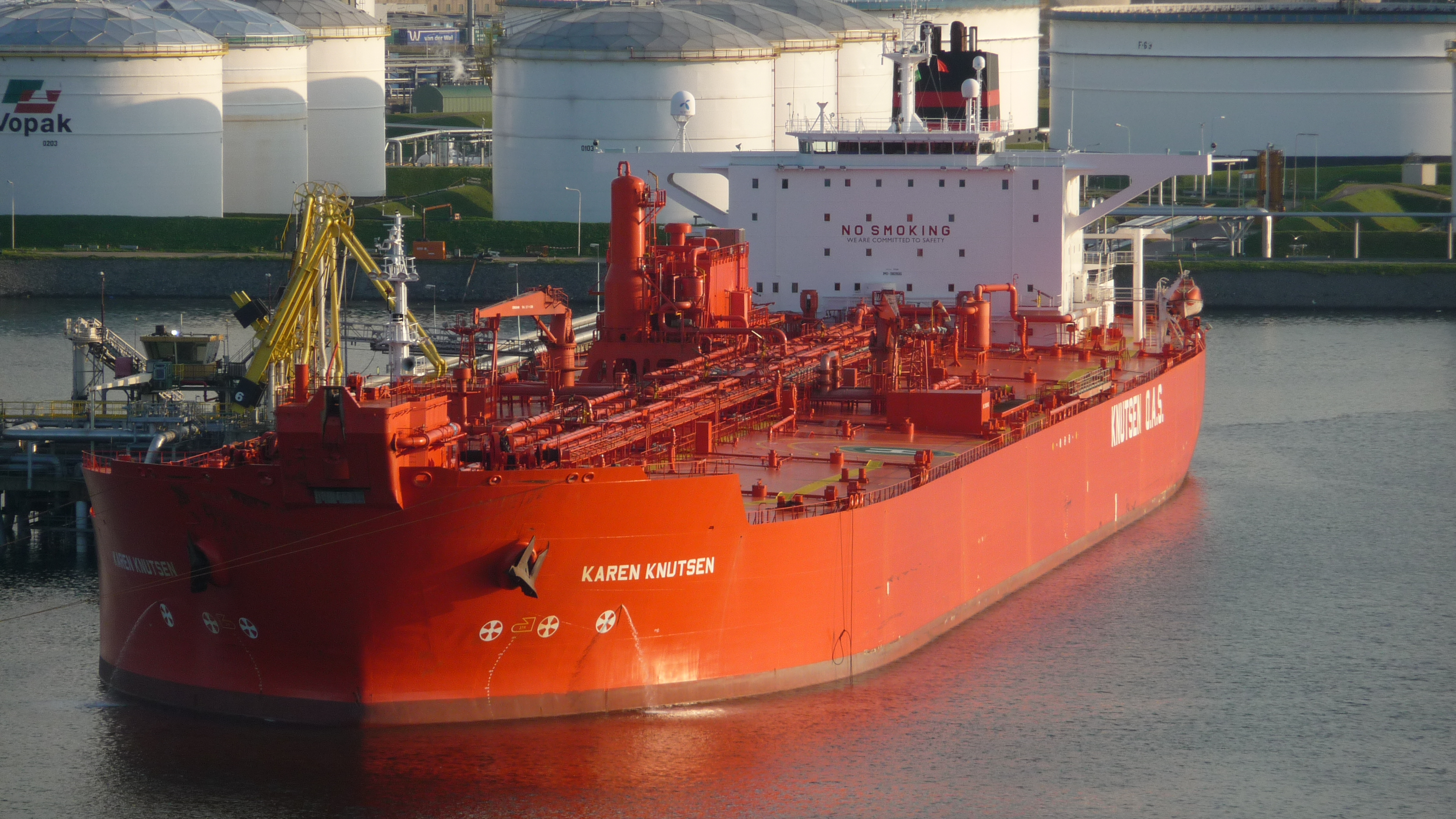
Shuttle tanker Karen Knutsen in the 7th Petroleum harbour in the port of Rotterdam.

A shuttle tanker is a ship designed for oil transport from an off-shore oil field as an alternative to constructing oil pipelines. It is equipped with off-loading equipment compatible with the oil field in question. This normally consists of a taut hawser arrangement or dynamic positioning to maintain the position relative to the field, an off-loading arrangement of pipes, and redundant safety systems to ensure that the potentially flammable crude oil is handled safely in a harsh environment.

Shuttle tankers initially started operating in the North Sea. They are now in use also in Brazil and Canada. Trials have been carried out in Gulf Of Mexico. There are plans to take up such operation in the Arctic Sea, north of western Russia.
