= Nuclear marine propulsion =

Propulsion system for marine vessels utilizing a nuclear powerplant

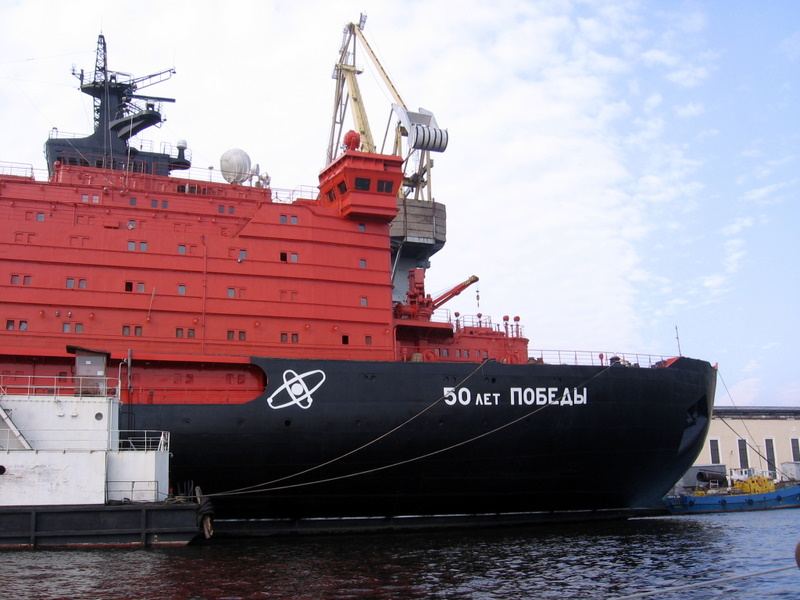
When the nuclear-powered Arktika class 50 Let Pobedy was put into service in 2007, it became the world's largest icebreaker.

Nuclear marine propulsion is propulsion of a ship or submarine with heat provided by a nuclear reactor. The power plant heats water to produce steam for a turbine used to turn the ship's propeller through a gearbox or through an electric generator and motor. Nuclear propulsion is used primarily within naval warships such as nuclear submarines and supercarriers. A small number of experimental civil nuclear ships have been built.

Compared to oil- or coal-fuelled ships, nuclear propulsion offers the advantage of very long intervals of operation before refueling. All the fuel is contained within the nuclear reactor, so no cargo or supplies space is taken up by fuel, nor is space taken up by exhaust stacks or combustion air intakes. The low fuel cost is offset by high operating costs and investment in infrastructure, however: nearly all nuclear-powered vessels are military, though several nuclear-powered icebreakers and cargo ships have been built.

== Power plants ==
=== Basic operation of naval ship or submarine ===
Most naval nuclear reactors are of the pressurized water type, with the exception of a small number of liquid metal-cooled reactors deployed by the Soviet Union and United States during the Cold War. A primary water circuit transfers heat generated from nuclear fission in the fuel to a steam generator; this water is kept under pressure so it does not boil. This circuit operates at a temperature of around 250 to 300 °C (482 to 572 °F). Any radioactive contamination in the primary water is confined. Water is circulated by pumps; at lower power levels, reactors designed for submarines may rely on natural circulation of the water to reduce noise generated by the pumps.

The hot water from the reactor heats a separate water circuit in the steam generator. That water is converted to steam and passes through steam driers on its way to the steam turbine. Spent steam at low pressure runs through a condenser cooled by seawater and returns to liquid form. The water is pumped back to the steam generator and continues the cycle. Any water lost in the process can be made up by desalinated sea water added to the steam generator feed water.

In the turbine, the steam expands and reduces its pressure as it imparts energy to the rotating blades of the turbine. There may be many stages of rotating blades and fixed guide vanes. The output shaft of the turbine may be connected to a gearbox to reduce rotation speed, then a shaft connects to the vessel's propellers. In another form of drive system, the turbine turns an electrical generator, and the electric power produced is fed to one or more drive motors for the vessel's propellers. The Russian, United States, and British navies rely on direct steam turbine propulsion, while French and Chinese ships use the turbine to generate electricity for propulsion (turbo-electric transmission).

Some nuclear submarines have a single reactor, but Russian submarines have two, and so had USS Triton. Most American aircraft carriers are powered by two reactors, but USS Enterprise had eight. During the Cold War, the Soviet and U.S. Navies experimented with liquid metal-cooled reactors as these coolants allowed for higher power density, smaller and lighter reactor sizes, and improved thermal efficiency without requiring high-pressure plumbing. This includes the Soviet Alfa-class submarines which were powered by lead-bismuth cooled reactors, while the US military developed a sole liquid sodium-cooled reactor onboard the USS Seawolf. However, this trend has been discontinued in modern vessels in favour of the operational simplicity of light water cooling.

=== Differences from land power plants ===
Marine-type reactors differ from land-based commercial electric power reactors in several respects.

While land-based reactors in nuclear power plants produce up to around 1600 megawatts of net electrical power (the nameplate capacity of the EPR), a typical marine propulsion reactor produces no more than a few hundred megawatts. Some small modular reactors (SMR) are similar to marine propulsion reactors in capacity and some design considerations and thus nuclear marine propulsion (whether civilian or military) is sometimes proposed as an additional market niche for SMRs. Unlike for land-based applications where hundreds of hectares can be occupied by installations like Bruce Nuclear Generating Station, at sea tight space limits dictate that a marine reactor must be physically small, so it must generate higher power per unit of space. This means its components are subject to greater stresses than those of a land-based reactor. Its mechanical systems must operate flawlessly under the adverse conditions encountered at sea, including vibration and the pitching and rolling of a ship operating in rough seas. Reactor shutdown mechanisms cannot rely on gravity to drop control rods into place as in a land-based reactor that always remains upright. Salt water corrosion is an additional problem that complicates maintenance.

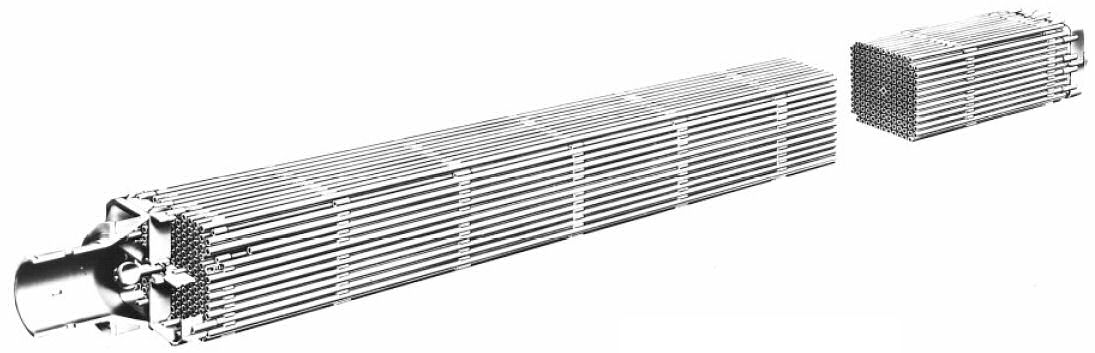
A nuclear fuel element for the cargo ship NS Savannah. The element contains four bundles of 41 fuel rods. The uranium oxide is enriched to 4.2 and 4.6 percent U-235

As the core of a seagoing reactor is much smaller than a power reactor, the probability of a neutron intersecting with a fissionable nucleus before it escapes into the shielding is much lower. As such, the fuel is typically more highly enriched (i.e., contains a higher concentration of ^{235}U vs. ^{238}U) than that used in a land-based nuclear power plant, which increases the probability of fission to the level where a sustained reaction can occur. Some marine reactors run on relatively low-enriched uranium, which requires more frequent refueling. Others run on highly enriched uranium, varying from 20% ^{235}U, to the over 96% ^{235}U found in U.S. submarines, in which the resulting smaller core is quieter in operation (a big advantage to a submarine). Using more-highly enriched fuel also increases the reactor's power density and extends the usable life of the nuclear fuel load, but is more expensive and a greater risk to nuclear proliferation than less-highly enriched fuel.

A marine nuclear propulsion plant must be designed to be highly reliable and self-sufficient, requiring minimal maintenance and repairs, which might have to be undertaken many thousands of miles from its home port. One of the technical difficulties in designing fuel elements for a seagoing nuclear reactor is the creation of fuel elements that will withstand a large amount of radiation damage. Fuel elements may crack over time and gas bubbles may form. The fuel used in marine reactors is a metal-zirconium alloy rather than the ceramic UO_{2} (uranium dioxide) often used in land-based reactors. Marine reactors are designed for long core life, enabled by the relatively high enrichment of the uranium and by incorporating a "burnable poison" in the fuel elements, which is slowly depleted as the fuel elements age and become less reactive. The gradual dissipation of the "nuclear poison" increases the reactivity of the core to compensate for the lessening reactivity of the aging fuel elements, thereby extending the usable life of the fuel. The compact reactor pressure vessel is provided with an internal neutron shield, which reduces the damage to the steel from constant neutron bombardment.

== Decommissioning ==
Decommissioning nuclear-powered submarines has become a major task for U.S. and Russian navies. After defuelling, U.S. practice is to cut the reactor section from the vessel for disposal in shallow land burial as low-level waste (see the ship-submarine recycling program). In Russia, whole vessels, or sealed reactor sections, typically remain stored afloat, although a new facility near Sayda Bay is to provide storage in a concrete-floored facility on land for some submarines in the far north.

== Future designs ==
Russia built a floating nuclear power plant for its far eastern territories. The design has two 35 MWe units based on the KLT-40 reactor used in icebreakers (with refueling every four years). Some Russian naval vessels have been used to supply electricity for domestic and industrial use in remote far eastern and Siberian towns.

In 2010, Lloyd's Register was investigating the possibility of civilian nuclear marine propulsion and rewriting draft rules.

== Civil liability ==
Insurance of nuclear vessels is not like the insurance of conventional ships. The consequences of an accident could span national boundaries, and the magnitude of possible damage is beyond the capacity of private insurers. A special international agreement, the Brussels Convention on the Liability of Operators of Nuclear Ships, developed in 1962, would have made signatory national governments liable for accidents caused by nuclear vessels under their flag but was never ratified owing to disagreement on the inclusion of warships under the convention. Nuclear reactors under United States jurisdiction are insured by the provisions of the Price–Anderson Act.

== Military nuclear ships ==
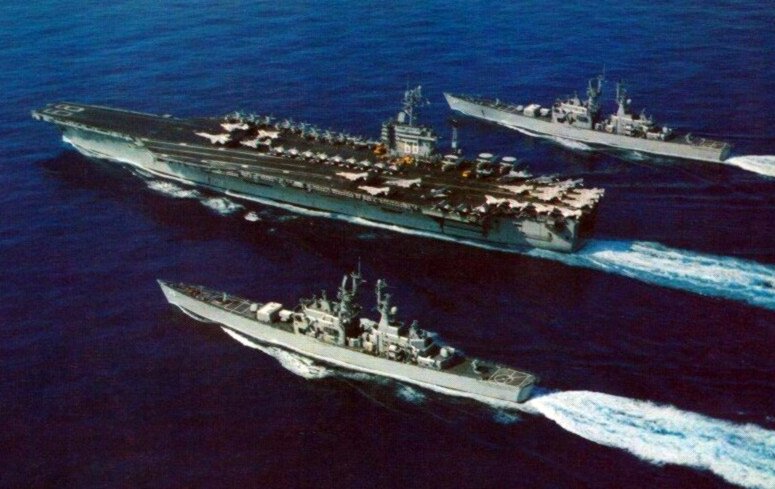
In addition to nuclear-powered aircraft carriers, the United States once operated nuclear-powered cruisers.

By 1990, there were more nuclear reactors powering ships (mostly military) than there were generating electric power in commercial power plants worldwide.

Under the direction of U.S. Navy Captain (later Admiral) Hyman G. Rickover, the design, development and production of nuclear marine propulsion plants started in the United States in the 1940s. The first prototype naval reactor was constructed and tested at the Naval Reactor Facility at the National Reactor Testing Station in Idaho (now called the Idaho National Laboratory) in 1953.

=== Submarines ===
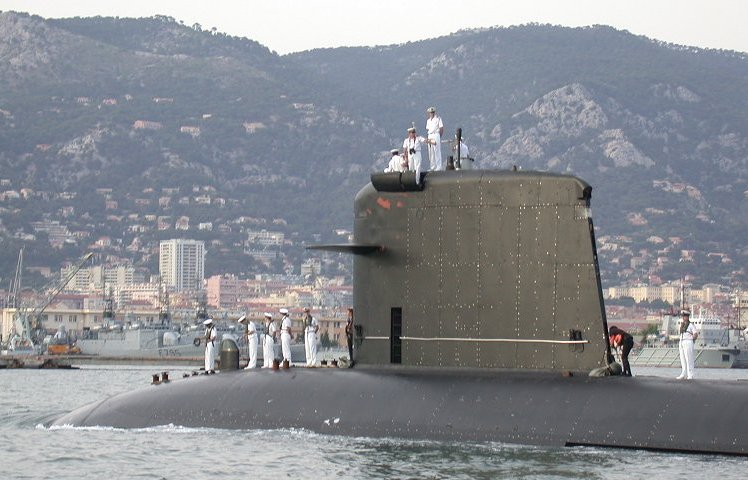
The nuclear-propelled French submarine Saphir returning to Toulon, its home port, after Mission Héraclès

The first nuclear submarine, USS Nautilus (SSN-571), put to sea in 1955 (SS was a traditional hull classification symbol for U.S. submarines, while SSN denoted the first "nuclear" submarine).

The Soviet Union also developed nuclear submarines. The first types developed were the Project 627, NATO-designated November class with two water-cooled reactors, the first of which, K-3 Leninsky Komsomol, was underway under nuclear power in 1958.

Nuclear power revolutionized the submarine, finally making it a true "underwater" vessel, rather than a "submersible" craft, which could only stay underwater for limited periods. It gave the submarine the ability to operate submerged at high speeds, comparable to those of surface vessels, for unlimited periods, dependent only on the endurance of its crew. To demonstrate this USS Triton was the first vessel to execute a submerged circumnavigation of the Earth (Operation Sandblast), doing so in 1960.

Nautilus, with a pressurized water reactor (PWR), led to the parallel development of other submarines like a unique liquid metal cooled (sodium) reactor in USS Seawolf, or two reactors in Triton, and then the Skate-class submarines, powered by single reactors, and a cruiser, USS Long Beach, in 1961, powered by two reactors.

By 1962, the United States Navy had 26 operational nuclear submarines and another 30 under construction. Nuclear power had revolutionized the Navy. The United States shared its technology with the United Kingdom, while French, Soviet, Indian and Chinese development proceeded separately.

After the Skate-class vessels, U.S. submarines were powered by a series of standardized, single-reactor designs built by Westinghouse and General Electric. Rolls-Royce plc built similar units for Royal Navy submarines, eventually developing a modified version of their own, the PWR2.

The largest nuclear submarines ever built are the 26,500 tonne Russian Typhoon class. The smallest nuclear warships to date are the 2,700 tonne French Rubis-class attack submarines. The U.S. Navy operated an unarmed nuclear submarine, the NR-1 Deep Submergence Craft, between 1969 and 2008, which was not a combat vessel but was the smallest nuclear-powered submarine at 400 tons.

=== Aircraft carriers ===
The United States and France have built nuclear aircraft carriers.

==== French Navy ====
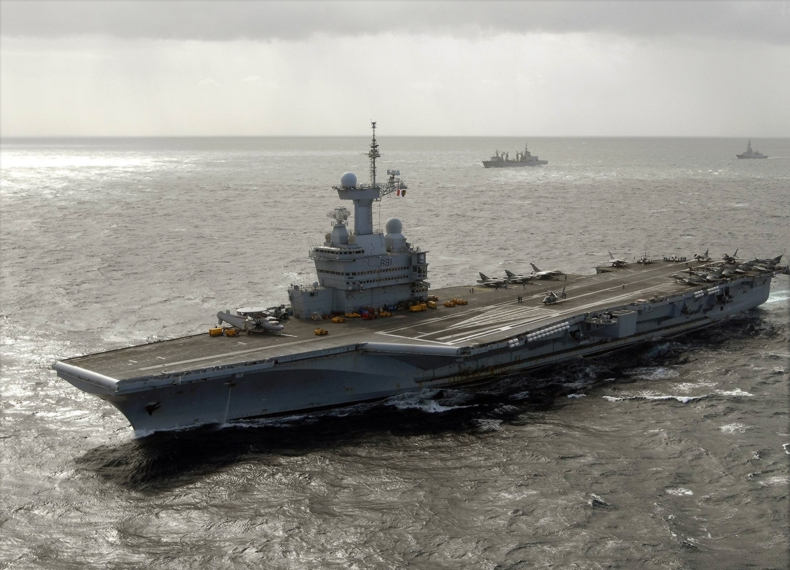
The aircraft carrier Charles de Gaulle of the French Navy

The sole French nuclear aircraft carrier example is Charles de Gaulle, commissioned in 2001 (a successor is planned).

The French carrier is equipped with catapults and arresters. The Charles de Gaulle has 42,000 tonnes, is the flagship of the French Navy (Marine Nationale). The ship carries a complement of Dassault Rafale M and E‑2C Hawkeye aircraft, EC725 Caracal and AS532 Cougar helicopters for combat search and rescue, as well as modern electronics and Aster missiles.

==== United States Navy ====
The United States Navy operates 11 carriers, all nuclear-powered:

- USS Enterprise: in service 1962–2012, powered by eight reactor units, is still the only aircraft carrier to house more than two nuclear reactors, with each A2W reactor taking the place of one of the conventional boilers in earlier constructions.
- Nimitz class: ten 101,000-ton, 1,092 ft long fleet carriers, the first of which was commissioned in 1975. A Nimitz-class carrier is powered by two nuclear reactors providing steam to four steam turbines.
- Gerald R. Ford class, one 110,000-ton, 1,106 ft long fleet carrier. The lead of the class Gerald R. Ford, came into service in 2017, with another nine planned.

==== Soviet Navy ====
Construction of the Soviet aircraft carrier Ulyanovsk began in 1988, but abandoned in 1991 after the dissolution of the Soviet Union.

=== Destroyers and cruisers ===
==== Russian Navy ====
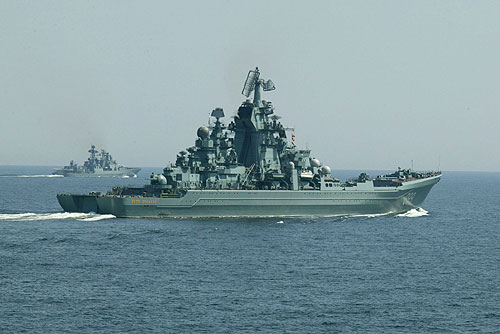
The Russian flagship Pyotr Veliky

The Kirov class, Soviet designation 'Project 1144 Orlan' (sea eagle), is a class of nuclear-powered guided-missile cruisers of the Soviet Navy and Russian Navy, the largest and heaviest surface combatant warships (i.e. not an aircraft carrier, amphibious assault ship, or submarine) in operation in the world. Among modern warships, they are second in size only to large aircraft carriers, and of similar size to World War II era battleships. The Soviet classification of the ship-type is "heavy nuclear-powered guided missile cruiser" (Russian: тяжёлый атомный ракетный крейсер). The ships are often referred to as battlecruisers by Western defence commentators due to their size and general appearance.

==== United States Navy ====
The United States Navy at one time had nuclear-powered cruisers as part of its fleet. The first such ship was USS Long Beach (CGN-9). Commissioned in 1961, she was the world's first nuclear-powered surface combatant. She was followed a year later by USS Bainbridge (DLGN-25). While Long Beach was designed and built as a cruiser, Bainbridge began life as a frigate, though at that time the Navy was using the hull code "DLGN" for "destroyer leader, guided missile, nuclear".

The last nuclear-powered cruisers the Americans would produce would be the four-ship Virginia class. USS Virginia (CGN-38) was commissioned in 1976, followed by USS Texas (CGN-39) in 1977, USS Mississippi (CGN-40) in 1978 and finally USS Arkansas (CGN-41) in 1980. Ultimately, all these ships proved to be too costly to maintain and they were all retired between 1993 and 1999.

=== Communication and command ships ===
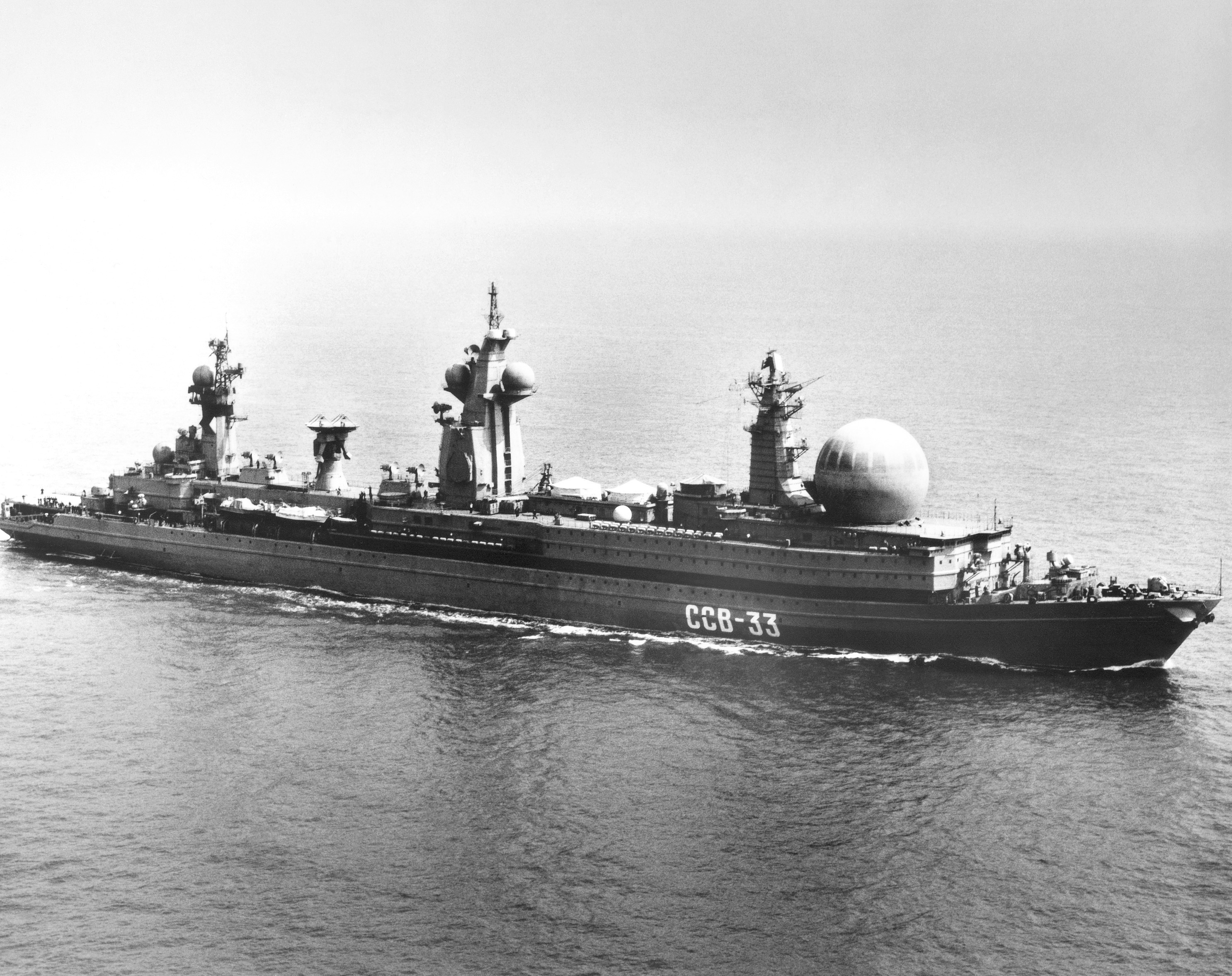
Command and communications ship SSV-33 Ural

SSV-33 Ural (ССВ-33 Урал; NATO reporting name: Kapusta [Russian for "cabbage"]) was a command and control naval ship operated by the Soviet Navy. SSV-33's hull was derived from that of the nuclear-powered Kirov-class battlecruisers with nuclear marine propulsion. SSV-33 served in electronic intelligence, missile tracking, space tracking, and communications relay roles. Due to high operating costs, SSV-33 was laid up.

SSV-33 carried only light defensive weapons. These were two AK-176 76 mm guns, four AK-630 30 mm guns, and four quadruple Igla missile mounts.

=== Nuclear-powered UUV ===
The Poseidon (Russian: Посейдон, "Poseidon", NATO reporting name Kanyon), previously known by Russian codename Status-6 (Russian: Статус-6), is a nuclear-powered and nuclear-armed unmanned underwater vehicle under development by Rubin Design Bureau, capable of delivering both conventional and nuclear payloads. According to Russian state TV, it is able to deliver a thermonuclear cobalt bomb of up to 200 megatonnes (four times as powerful as the most powerful device ever detonated, the Tsar Bomba, and twice its maximum theoretical yield) against an enemy's naval ports and coastal cities.

== Civilian nuclear ships ==
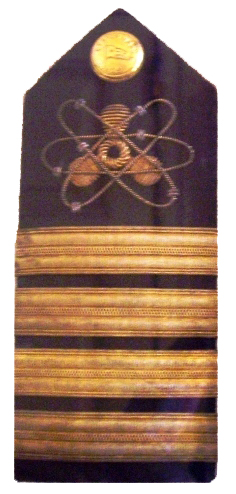
Engineer epaulette from Savannah

The following are ships that are or were in commercial or civilian use and have nuclear marine propulsion.

=== Merchant ships ===
Nuclear-powered civil merchant ships have not developed beyond a few experimental ships. The U.S.-built NS Savannah, completed in 1962, was primarily a demonstration of civil nuclear power and was too small and expensive to operate economically as a merchant ship. The design was too much of a compromise, being neither an efficient freighter nor a viable passenger liner. The German-built Otto Hahn, a cargo ship and research facility completed in 1968, sailed some 650,000 nautical miles (1,200,000 km) on 126 voyages over 10 years without any technical problems. It proved too expensive to operate and was converted to diesel. The Japanese Mutsu, completed in 1972, was dogged by technical and political problems. Its reactor had significant radiation leakage and fishermen protested against the vessel's operation. All of these three ships used low-enriched uranium. Sevmorput, a Soviet and later Russian LASH carrier with icebreaking capability, has operated successfully on the Northern Sea Route since it was commissioned in 1988. As of 2021, it is the only nuclear-powered merchant ship in service.

Civilian nuclear ships suffer from the costs of specialized infrastructure. The Savannah was expensive to operate, particularly since it was the only vessel using its specialized nuclear shore staff and servicing facility. In principle, a larger fleet could share fixed costs among more operating vessels, reducing operating costs. For this reason, there is still some interest in nuclear propulsion for merchant vessels. Additionally, nuclear propulsion would support decarbonization of marine shipping, which accounts for 3–4% of global greenhouse gas emissions. At present no nuclear ships are engaged in international trade.

In November 2010 British Maritime Technology and Lloyd's Register embarked upon a two-year study with U.S.-based Hyperion Power Generation (now Gen4 Energy), and the Greek ship operator Enterprises Shipping and Trading SA, to investigate practical maritime applications for small modular reactors. The research intended to produce a concept tanker-ship design, based on a 70 MW reactor such as Hyperion’s. In response to its members’ interest in nuclear propulsion, Lloyd’s Register has also re-written its ‘rules’ for nuclear ships, which concern the integration of a reactor certified by a land-based regulator with the rest of the ship. In contrast to current practice, by which the designer/builder typically demonstrates compliance with regulatory requirements, nuclear regulators in future may require the operator of the nuclear plant to demonstrate safety in operation, in addition to safety through design and construction.

As a result of this work, in 2014 two papers on commercial nuclear marine propulsion were published by Lloyd's Register and the other members of this consortium. These publications review past and recent work in the area of marine nuclear propulsion, and describe a preliminary concept design study for a 155,000 DWT Suezmax tanker based on a conventional hull form with alternative arrangements to accommodate a 70 MW nuclear propulsion plant delivering up to 23.5 MW shaft power at maximum continuous rating (average: 9.75 MW). The Gen4Energy power module considered is a small fast-neutron reactor using lead–bismuth eutectic cooling, able to operate for ten full-power years before refueling, and remain in service for the 25-year operational life of the vessel. They conclude that the concept is feasible, but further maturation of nuclear technology, and development and harmonisation of a regulatory framework, would be necessary before the concept would be viable.

=== Merchant cargo ships ===
- USNS American Explorer; United States tanker, converted to conventional power while under construction
- Mutsu, Japan (1970–1992); never carried commercial cargo, rebuilt as diesel engine powered RV Mirai in 1996
- Otto Hahn, Germany (1968–1979); re-powered with diesel engine in 1979
- NS Savannah, United States (1962–1972)
- Sevmorput, Russia (1988–present), ice-strengthened nuclear-powered lighter aboard ship (LASH) carrier

In December 2023, the Jiangnan Shipyard under the China State Shipbuilding Corporation officially released a design of a 24,000 TEU-class container ship — known as the KUN-24AP — at Marintec China 2023, a premier maritime industry exhibition held in Shanghai. The container ship is reported to be powered by a thorium-based molten salt reactor, making it the first thorium-powered container ship and, if completed, the largest nuclear-powered container ship in the world. For comparison, as of 2025 the largest container ships can carry 24,346 TEUs

=== Icebreakers ===
Nuclear propulsion has proven both technically and economically feasible for nuclear-powered icebreakers in the Soviet, and later Russian, Arctic. Nuclear-fuelled ships operate for years without refueling, and the vessels have powerful engines, well-suited to the task of icebreaking.

The Soviet icebreaker Lenin was the world's first nuclear-powered surface vessel in 1959 and remained in service for 30 years (new reactors were fitted in 1970). It led to a series of larger icebreakers, the 23,500 ton Arktika class of six vessels, launched beginning in 1975. These vessels have two reactors and are used in deep Arctic waters. NS Arktika was the first surface vessel to reach the North Pole.

For use in shallow waters such as estuaries and rivers, shallow-draft, Taymyr-class icebreakers were built in Finland and then fitted with their single-reactor nuclear propulsion system in Russia. They were built to conform to international safety standards for nuclear vessels.

All nuclear-powered icebreakers have been commissioned by the Soviet Union or Russia.

- Lenin (1959–1989; museum ship)
- Arktika (1975–2008; decommissioned)
- Sibir (1977–1992; decommissioned)
- Rossiya (1985–2013; decommissioned)
- Taymyr (1989–present)
- Sovetskiy Soyuz (1989–2014; decommissioned)
- Vaygach (1990–present)
- Yamal (1992–present)
- 50 Let Pobedy (2007–present)
- Arktika (2020–present)
- Sibir (2021–present)
- Ural (2022–present)
- Yakutiya (2024–present)

== See also ==
- Air-independent propulsion
- Aircraft Nuclear Propulsion
- Knolls Atomic Power Laboratory
- List of United States Naval reactors
- Naval Reactors
- Nuclear navy
- Nuclear-powered aircraft
- Nuclear Power School
- Soviet naval reactors
- United States naval reactors
- United States Navy Nuclear Propulsion
