= Alexey Korolyuk =

Soviet-Russian sculptor and medallist

Alexey Alexeevich Korolyuk
- Алексей Алексеевич Королюк
- Born: 16 February 1933; Leningrad
- Died: 10 May 2002 (aged 69); Saint Petersburg
- Resting place: Volkovo Cemetery, Writer's Walkways; 59.904674°N 30.360658°E
- Education: Vera Mukhina Higher School of Art and Design
- Known for: Sculpture, Medal and plaquette design
- Awards: Order of Friendship of Peoples; 1968
- Elected: 1st president of Leningrad medal club

Alexey Alexeevich Korolyuk (Russian: Алексей Алексеевич Королюк; 16 February 1933 – 10 May 2002) was a Soviet-Russian sculptor and medallist, and the first president of the Leningrad medal club.

== Biography ==
Korolyuk was born in Leningrad in 1933. He was passionate about art since his early years, attended Tavricheskaya Art School classes along with studying in local school and later entered the Department of Monumental and Decorative Sculpture at Vera Mukhina Higher School of Art and Design. He graduated in 1961 and was accepted into Artists' Union of the USSR in the mid-1960s.

His early sculpture works include numerous monuments devoted to Great Patriotic War heroes and Soviet political and public figures, among the latter there are bas-reliefs for Saint Petersburg Metro underground platforms and sculptural decorations of Soviet nuclear-powered icebreakers Arktika and Sibir and space control-monitoring ships Kosmonavt Yuri Gagarin and Marshal Nedelin. But his artistic career was severally influenced by two injuries: he lost his legs in a tramcar accident and an accident during sculpting. Reduced mobility encouraged him to design small objects — medals and plaquettes.

His first designs were presented at "Leningrad" zonal art exhibition in 1964 and brought him professional recognition. Throughout the following years he designed over 100 medals and plaquettes devoted to notable historical events, workers of culture and science. Korolyuk's medals and plaquettes were presented on numerous Soviet and international exhibitions including FIDEM congresses in Prague (1970), Kraków (1975), Budapest (1977), London (1992), Neuchâtel (1996) and Berlin (2000). The medal designed for Pasteur Institute received high praise from Monnaie de Paris in 1972 and was sent to Soviet space station Salyut 7 ten years later with an international crew of Soviet and French cosmonauts. As a medallist Korolyuk taught younger artists and worked on the community of medallists and collectors. In recognition of his contribution he was unanimously elected as president of Leningrad medal club, created in 1990.

Alexey Korolyuk died on 10 May 2002 in Leningrad at the age of sixty-nine and was buried at Writer's Walkways of Volkovo Cemetery. His works reside in collections of major Russian museums including Tretyakov Gallery and State Hermitage Museum.

== Awards ==
- 1967 — Order of Friendship of Peoples

== Catalogues ==
- Зональная выставка, Ленинград, 1964. — Л.: Художник РСФСР, 1965. — p. 76. — 2000 copies.
- Советские памятные медали (1917—1967). — Л.: Наука, 1968. — pp. 11, 43, 56, 59. — (Государственный ордена Ленина Эрмитаж). — 2000 copies.
- Mezinárodní výstava současné medaile.. — Praha: F.I.D.E.M., 1970. — pp. 56, 76
- I Всесоюзная выставка медальерного искусства. — М.: Советский художник, 1973. — p. 83. — 816 pages. — 2000 copies.
- О медальерном искусстве последних лет // Советская скульптура. — Советский художник, 1976. — No. 74. — pp. 194–199.
- A Budapesti XVII FIDEM Kongresszus Nemzetközi Éremkiállitása / Rédaction: Suzanne Csengery-Nagy. — Budapest, Hungary, 1977. — p. 258. — ISBN 3-7861-2368-3.
- А. В. Косарева. Искусство медали. — М.: Просвещение, 1977. — pp. 109–110. — 127 pages.
- На XVII международном конгрессе медальерного искусства // Советская скульптура. — Советский художник, 1978. — No. 78. — p. 285.
- Шестьдесят лет советской памятной медали // Советская скульптура. — Советский художник, 1981. — No. 79/80. — pp. 40, 41.
- Русские и советские настольные военно-морские медали. — Л., 1988. — pp. 11, 92, 149,. — (Центральный военно-морской ордена Красной звезды музей).
- Вторая ленинградская медальерная выставка, 1990. — Л.: НПО «Дальняя связь», 1990. — pp. 11, 92, 149.
- In the Round: Contemporary art medals of the world. — Inverness: Bookmag, 1992. — p. 237.
- Exposition internationale de medailles d'art contemporaines XXVI FIDEM 1996. — Neuchatel, Switzerland, 1996. — p. 199.
- И. А. Мелуа. Инженеры Санкт-Петербурга. — СПб. — М.: Издательство международного фонда истории науки, 1996. — p. 323. — 816 pages. — (Биографическая международная энциклопедия «Гуманистика»). — ISBN 5-86050-081-5.
- Яков Владимирович Брук, Лидия Ивановна Иовлева. Государственная Третьяковская галерея: Скульптура XVIII-XX веков. — М.: Красная площадь, 1998. — p. 335.
- Wolfgang Steguwell. XXVII FIDEM 2000 Internationale Medaillenkunst / Katalogbearbeiung: Martin Heidermann. — Berlin, Weimar: Deutsche Gesellschaft fur Medaillenkunst, 2000. — p. 278. — ISBN 3-7861-2368-3.
