= Vaygach (disambiguation) =

Vaygach may refer to

- Vaygach Island, island in the Arctic Sea between the Pechora Sea and the Kara Sea
- Vaygach, Imperial Russian icebreaker built in 1909 that sank in 1918
- Vaygach (nuclear icebreaker), Soviet and later Russian nuclear-powered icebreaker built in 1990
