= Arktika-class icebreaker =

Russian class of nuclear-powered icebreakers

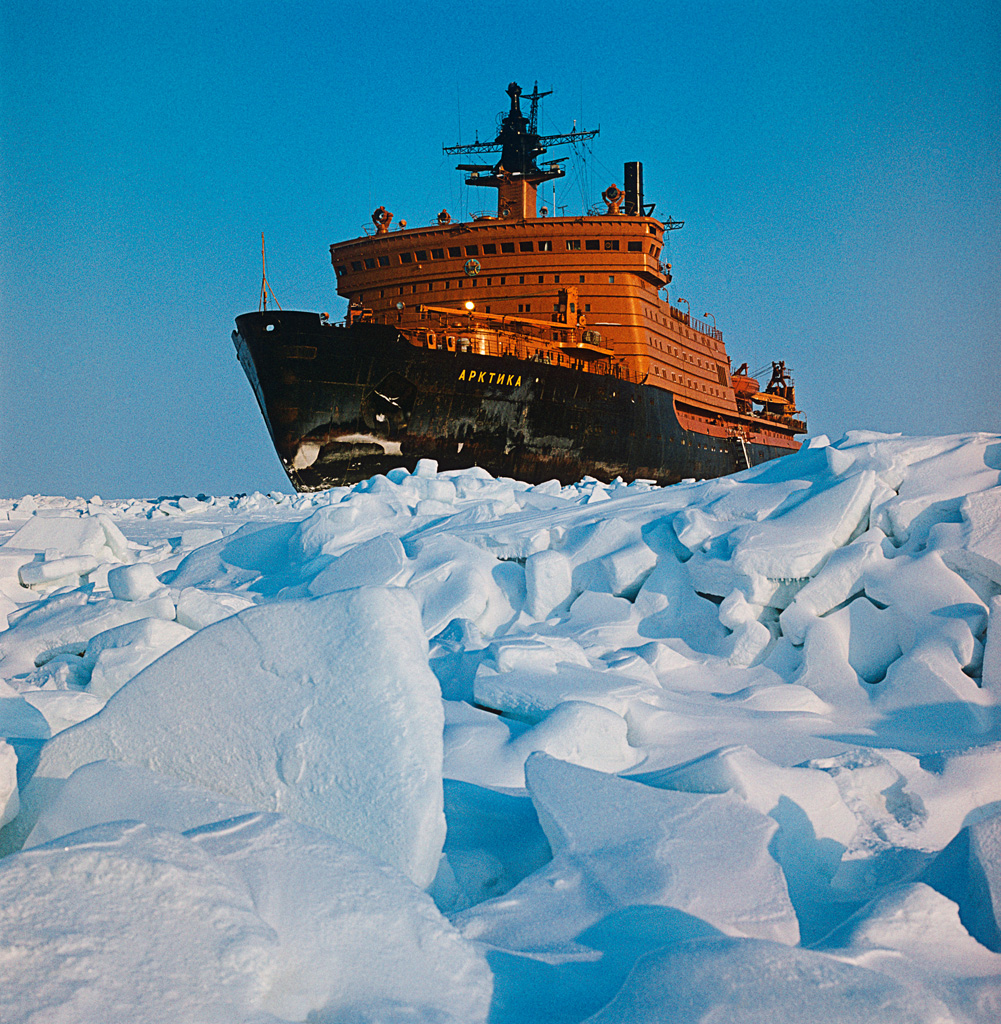
- Arktika in November 1980

Class overview
- Builders: Baltic Shipyard
- Operators: FSUE Atomflot
- Succeeded by: Project 22220 icebreaker
- Built: 1971–2007
- In service: 1975–present
- Completed: 6
- Active: 2
- Retired: 4

General characteristics
- Type: Icebreaker
- Tonnage: 20-24,000 GT
- Displacement: 23,000–25,168 tons
- Length: 148 m (486 ft)
- Beam: 30 m (98 ft)
- Height: 17.2 m (56 ft)
- Draught: 11 m (36 ft)
- Installed power: Two OK-900A nuclear reactors (2 × 171 MW); Two steam turbogenerators (2 × 27.6 MW)
- Propulsion: Nuclear-turbo-electric; Three shafts (3 × 18 MW)
- Speed: 20.6 knots (38.2 km/h; 23.7 mph) (maximum)
- Endurance: 7.5 months
- Crew: 189
- Aircraft carried: 1 × Mi-2, Mi-8 or Ka-27 helicopter
- Aviation facilities: Helipad and hangar for one helicopter

The Arktika class is a Russian (formerly Soviet) class of nuclear-powered icebreakers. Also known by their Russian designations Project 10520 (first two ships) and Project 10521 (from third ship onwards), they were the world's largest and most powerful icebreakers until the 2016 launch of the first Project 22220 icebreaker, also named Arktika.

Ships of the Arktika class are owned by the federal government, but were operated by the Murmansk Shipping Company (MSCO) until 2008, when they were transferred to the fully state-owned corporation Atomflot. Of the ten civilian nuclear-powered vessels built by Russia or the Soviet Union, six were of this type.

They are used for escorting merchant ships in the Arctic Ocean north of Siberia as well as for scientific and recreational expeditions to the Arctic.

== History ==
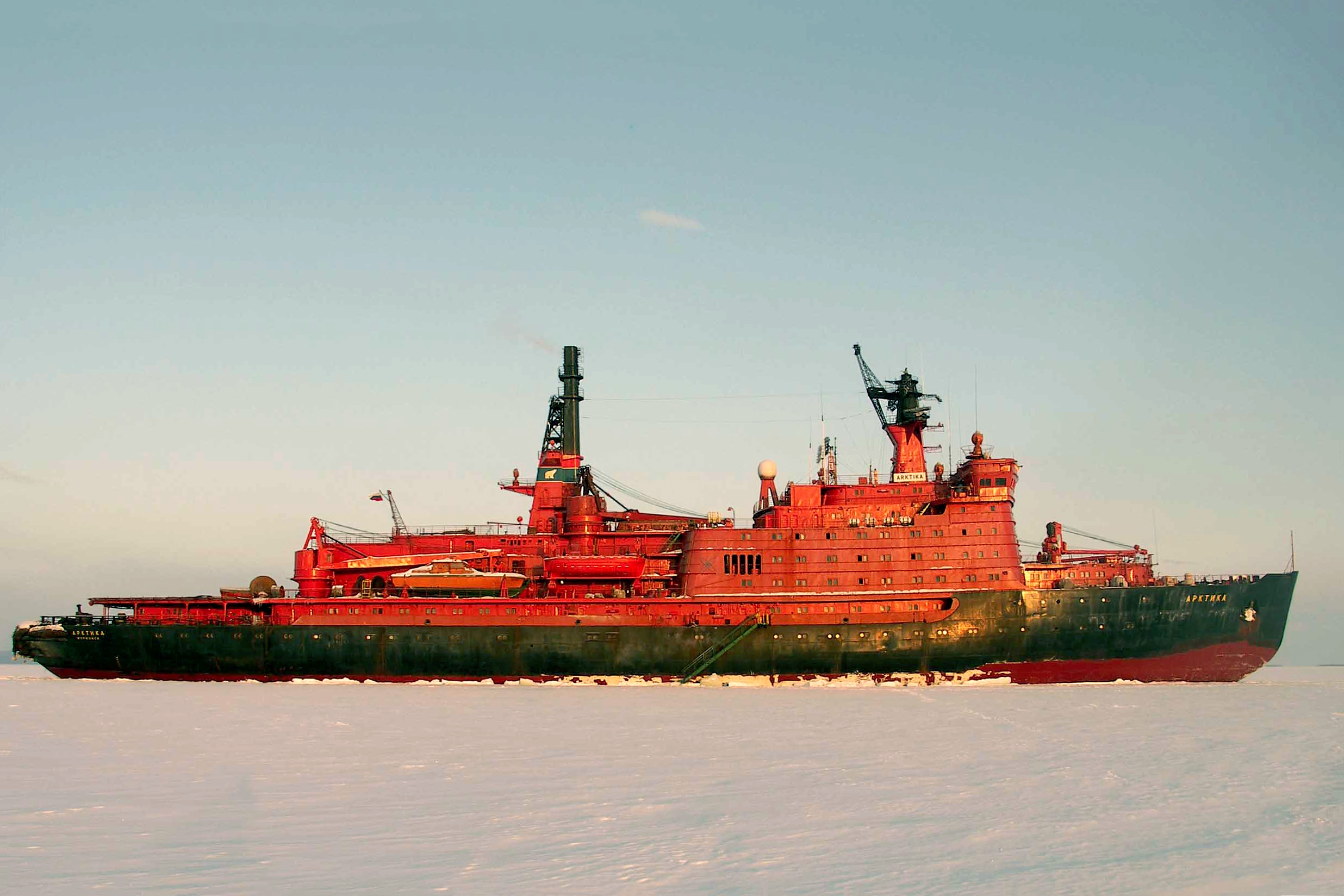
Arktika

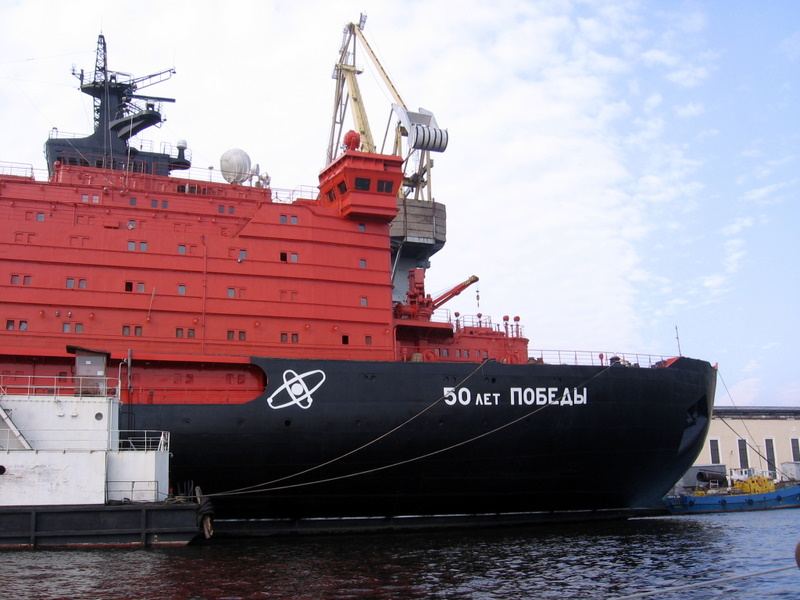
50 Let Pobedy

On 3 July 1971, construction began on a conceptual design of a larger nuclear icebreaker, dubbed Arktika, in the Baltic Shipyard in then Leningrad. Four years later on 17 December 1975, the first ship completed sea trials.

Arktika was the first surface ship to reach the North Pole, on 17 August 1977.

As the leading vessel in Russia's second nuclear icebreaker class, Arktika became the classification name for five icebreakers to follow: the Sibir in 1977, Rossiya in 1985, Sovetskiy Soyuz in 1989, the Yamal in 1992, and the 50 Let Pobedy in 2007.

The first of new class of nuclear icebreakers, Project 22220, was launched in 2016. Also called Arktika, it was launched in anticipation of decreasing ice due to global warming and increased traffic.

== Design and construction ==
=== OK-900A reactors ===
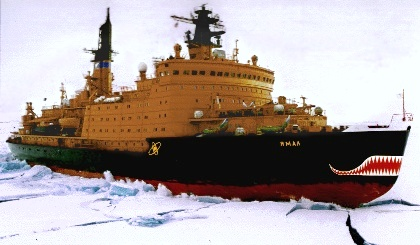
Yamal

Over the period December 1967 to May 1970, Lenin, precursor of the Arktika and the first nuclear-propelled icebreaker, had its three OK-150 reactors, capable of 90 MW each, replaced with two OK-900 reactors, capable of 159 MW each. The work was carried out at the Zvezdochka yard in Severodvinsk.

Arktika and the entire Arktika-class icebreaker fleet are outfitted with two OK-900A reactors, which deliver 171 MW each. Each reactor is contained in its own closed compartment and weighs 160 tonnes. They are shielded by water, steel, and high density concrete, and ambient radiation is monitored throughout the ship by 86 sensors. The reactors were originally fuelled by a 90% enriched, zirconium-clad, uranium fuel. Those reactors still in operation today now use a 20%-90% enriched with 60% average enrichment uranium dispersed in an aluminium matrix. The chain reaction can be stopped in 0.6 seconds by the full insertion of safety rods.

Arktika consumes up to 200 grams of fuel a day when breaking ice. There are 500 kg of uranium isotopes in each reactor, allowing for at least 13.7 years between changing reactor cores. The used cores are extracted and replaced in Murmansk, the spent fuel reprocessed and waste disposed of at a radioactive waste plant.

=== Propulsion ===
The OK-900A is a pressurized water reactor, meaning that cooling water is continually pumped under pressure through the reactor to remove heat, keeping the cores and the reactor cool. The heated water is pumped from the reactor to a boiler (four boilers per reactor), where it transfers its heat into another body of water, producing steam at a rate of 30 kgf/cm^{2} (2.94 MPa, or approximately 1,084 psi). Each set of four boilers drives two steam turbines, which turn three dynamos. One kilovolt of direct current is then delivered to three double-wound motors directly connected to the propeller, providing an average screw velocity of 120-180 rpm. Five auxiliary steam turbines are tied into the plant to provide electricity, turning generators with a cumulative electric power of 10 MW.

Three fixed-pitch propellers provide Arktika with its thrust, power, and maneuverability. The starboard and centerline propellers turn clockwise while the port turns counter clockwise to compensate. Each propeller sits at the end of a 20-metre (65.6 ft) shaft and has four blades, which weigh seven tons and are attached by nine bolts to the hub which is 5.7 meters (18.7 ft) in diameter and weighs 50 tonnes. Arktika also carries four spare blades along with the appropriate diving equipment and tools so that propeller repairs may be made at sea; the operation can take anywhere from one to four days depending on the extent of the damage.

The propellers can deliver a combined bollard pull of 480 tons with 18-43 MW (25,000 shaft horsepower) [totals: 55.3 MW (75,000 shp)]. This amounts to a maximum speed of 22 knots (41 km/h; 25 mph) on open water, full speed of 19 knots (35 km/h; 22 mph), and an average speed of 3 knots (5.6 km/h; 3.5 mph) while icebreaking 2–3 m (7–10 ft) thick level ice.

== Ships ==
Name	Builder	Laid down	Launched	Commissioned	Status
Arktika	Baltic Shipyard	3 July 1971	26 December 1972	25 April 1975	Decommissioned in 2008, moored in Murmansk
Sibir	Baltic Shipyard	26 June 1974	23 February 1976	28 December 1977	Decommissioned in 1992, moored in Murmansk
Rossiya	Baltic Shipyard	20 February 1981	2 November 1983	20 December 1985	Decommissioned in 2013, laid up in Murmansk
Sovetskiy Soyuz	Baltic Shipyard	2 November 1983	31 October 1986	29 December 1989	Decommissioned in 2014, laid up in Murmansk
Yamal	Baltic Shipyard	1986	1989	October 1992	In service
50 Let Pobedy	Baltic Shipyard	4 October 1989	29 December 1993	23 March 2007	In service

== See also ==
- Taymyr (1987 icebreaker)
- Vaygach (1989 icebreaker)
