= Vaygach (icebreaker) =

Two icebreakers have been named Vaygach:

- Vaygach (1909 icebreaker) (1909–1918), a steam-powered icebreaker that sank in 1918
- Vaygach (1989 icebreaker), a nuclear-powered shallow draft icebreaker that entered service in 1990
