= Sovetskiy Soyuz (icebreaker) =

Arktika-class icebreaker built in 1989

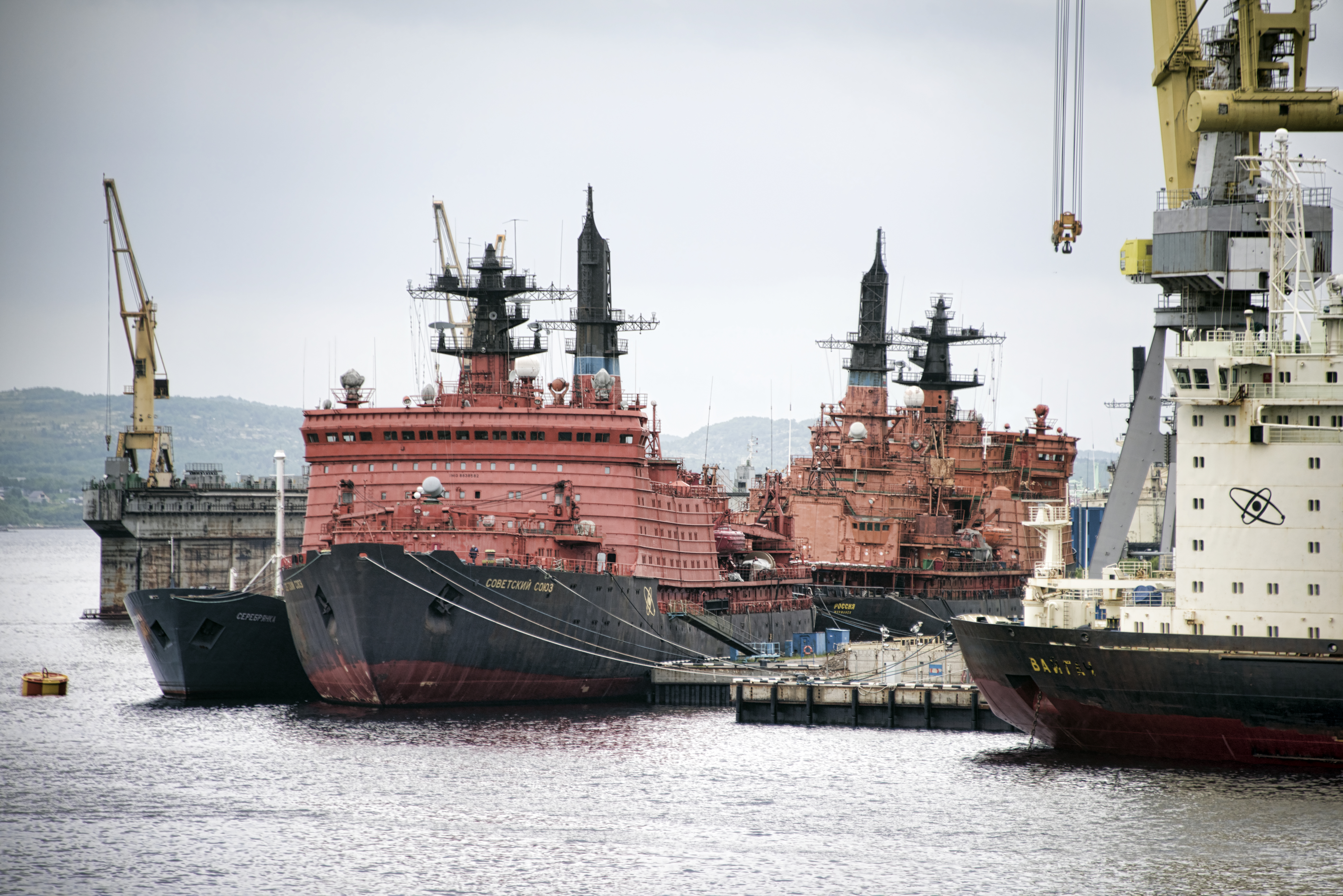
- Sovetskiy Soyuz and other Russian icebreakers in Murmansk on June 27, 2015

History

Russia
- Name: Sovetskiy Soyuz (Советский Союз)
- Namesake: Soviet Union
- Owner: Russian Federation
- Operator: FSUE Atomflot
- Port of registry: 1990–1992: Murmansk, Soviet Union; 1992 onwards: Murmansk, Russia
- Builder: Baltic Shipyard
- Yard number: 703
- Laid down: 2 November 1983
- Launched: 31 October 1986
- Commissioned: 29 December 1989
- Decommissioned: 2014
- In service: 1989–2014
- Identification: Call sign: UCJJ; IMO number: 8838582; MMSI number: 273132300
- Status: Laid up since 2 August 2012

General characteristics
- Class & type: Arktika-class icebreaker
- Tonnage: 20,646 GT; 6,194 NT; 2,750 DWT
- Displacement: 23,000 tons
- Length: 148 m (486 ft)
- Beam: 30 m (98 ft)
- Draught: 11 m (36 ft)
- Depth: 17.2 m (56 ft)
- Installed power: Two OK-900A nuclear reactors (2 × 171 MW); Two steam turbogenerators (2 × 27.6 MW)
- Propulsion: Nuclear-turbo-electric; Three shafts (3 × 18 MW)
- Speed: 20.6 knots (38.2 km/h; 23.7 mph) (maximum)
- Endurance: 7.5 months
- Aircraft carried: 1 × Mi-2, Mi-8 or Ka-27 helicopter
- Aviation facilities: Helipad and hangar for one helicopter

Sovetskiy Soyuz (Russian: Советский Союз, IPA: [sɐˈvʲetskʲɪj sɐˈjus]; literally: Soviet Union) was the fourth Russian Arktika-class nuclear-powered icebreaker operated by FSUE Atomflot. The ship, which is named after the Soviet Union, was built by Baltic Shipyard in Leningrad and entered service in 1990. She was decommissioned in 2014.

In January 2016, it was reported that the icebreaker will be converted into a command ship. However, this was later retracted and the nuclear-powered icebreaker is now slated for scrapping.
