= 50 Let Pobedy =

Russian Arktika-class icebreaker

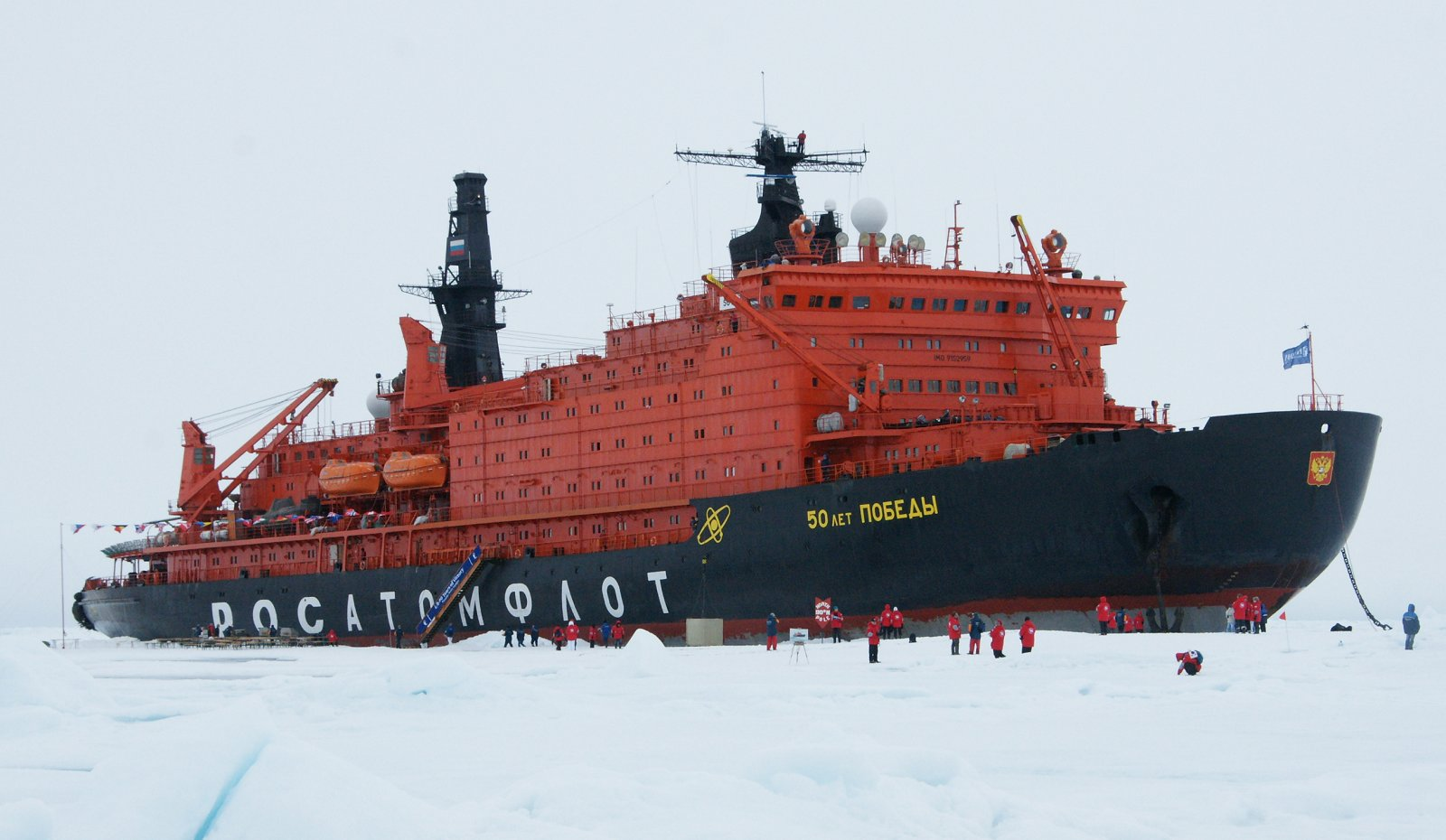

History

Russia
- Name: 50 Let Pobedy (50 лет Победы)
- Namesake: 50th anniversary of the end of the Great Patriotic War
- Owner: Russian Federation
- Operator: FSUE Atomflot
- Port of registry: Murmansk, Russia
- Builder: Baltic Shipyard
- Yard number: 705
- Laid down: 4 October 1989
- Launched: 29 December 1993
- Commissioned: 23 March 2007
- Maiden voyage: 2007
- Home port: Murmansk
- Identification: IMO number: 9152959; Call sign: UGYU
- Status: In service

General characteristics
- Class & type: Arktika-class icebreaker
- Tonnage: 23,439 GT; 3,505 DWT
- Displacement: 25,168 tons
- Length: 159.6 m (524 ft)
- Beam: 30 m (98 ft)
- Draught: 11 m (36 ft)
- Depth: 17.2 m (56 ft)
- Installed power: Two OK-900A nuclear reactors (2 × 171 MW); Two steam turbogenerators (2 × 27.6 MW)
- Propulsion: Nuclear-turbo-electric; Three shafts (3 × 17.6 MW)
- Speed: 21.4 knots (39.6 km/h; 24.6 mph) (maximum)
- Endurance: 7.5 months
- Crew: 140
- Aircraft carried: 1 × Mi-2, Mi-8 or Ka-27 helicopter
- Aviation facilities: Helipad and hangar for one helicopter

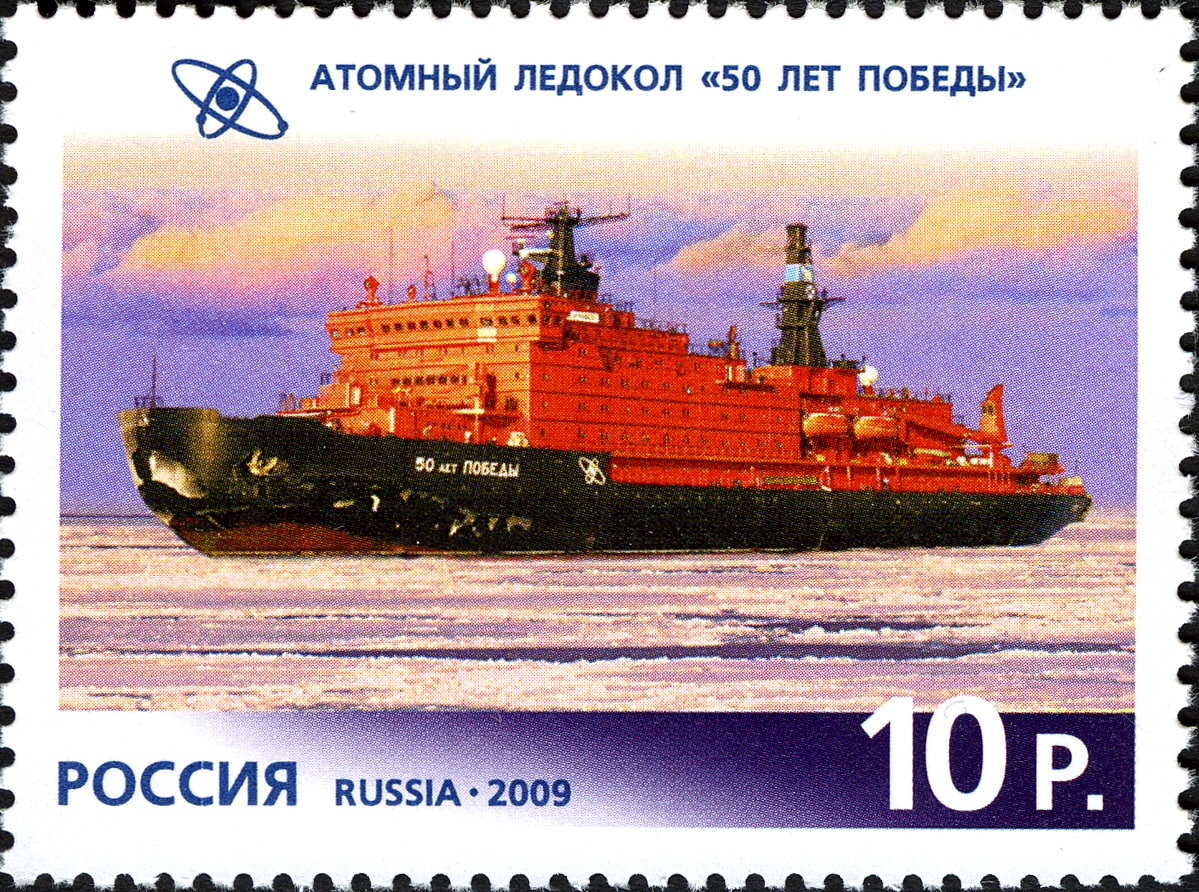
50 Let Pobedy on a Russian stamp

50 Let Pobedy (Russian: 50 лет Победы; "50 Years of Victory", referring to the anniversary of victory of the Soviet Union in World War II) is a Russian Arktika-class nuclear-powered icebreaker. The ship was laid down in the Soviet Union in 1989, and construction was halted by the Russian government in 1994 following the dissolution of the Soviet Union. Construction was restarted in 2003 and completed in 2007.

== History ==
Construction on project no. 10521 started on 4 October 1989, at the Baltic Works in Leningrad (now Saint Petersburg), USSR. Originally the ship was named Ural. It was launched in 1993. Work was halted in 1994 for lack of funds, so that the actual fiftieth anniversary of Victory Day in 1995, after which she was named, found the ship in an abandoned state. Construction was restarted in 2003.

On 30 November 2004, a fire broke out on the ship. All workers aboard the vessel had to be evacuated while the fire crews battled the fire for some 20 hours before getting it under control; one worker was sent to the hospital.

She was finally completed in the beginning of 2007, after the sixtieth anniversary. The icebreaker sailed into the Gulf of Finland for two weeks of sea trials on 1 February 2007. Upon completing sea trials, the icebreaker returned to St. Petersburg Baltic shipyard and started preparations for her maiden voyage to Murmansk. The new ship showed superior characteristics for an icebreaker, such as exceptional maneuverability and a top speed of 21.4 knots (39.6 km/h; 24.6 mph).

She arrived at her homeport Murmansk on 11 April 2007.

On 26 January 2025, 50 Let Pobedy collided with the dry bulk cargo ship Yamal Krechet while transiting the Kara Sea. The collision resulted in damage to the port side edge plating in a section of the bow of the ship. However, the damage did not affect the operational capability of the ship, nor compromise the security of the ships nuclear reactor. No crew were injured.

== Characteristics ==
The icebreaker is an upgrade of the Arktika class. The 159.60 m (524 ft) long and 30.0 m (98 ft) wide vessel, with a displacement of 25,840 metric tons, is designed to break through ice up to 2.5 metres (8.2 ft) thick. She operates with a crew of 140.

50 Let Pobedy is also an experimental project; for the first time in the history of Russian icebreakers the design incorporated a spoon-shaped bow. As predicted by the ship's designers, such a shape increases the efficiency of the ship's efforts in breaking ice. The icebreaker was equipped in 2007 with a new digital automated control system. The biological shielding complex was heavily modernized and re-certified by the State Commission. A new ecological compartment was created.

The ship is equipped with an air bubbling system and water ballast located in between the inner and outer hulls to aide ice breaking capabilities. The air bubbling system uses from jets at 9m under the surface that can output up to 24 m³/s.

== Arctic tourism ==
Since 1989 the nuclear-powered icebreakers have also been used for tourist purposes carrying passengers to the North Pole. Each participant pays up to US$45,000 for a cruise lasting two weeks. The Fiftieth Anniversary of Victory contains an accommodation deck customised for tourists, a helicopter deck suitable for Mil Mi-2 and Ka-32 helicopters for tours to remote islands and several Zodiac boats for transport to and from land. The ship has a capacity of 140 crew and 128 passengers. For entertainment, an athletic/exercise facility, a swimming pool, a library, a restaurant, a massage facility, and a music salon are onboard.

Quark Expeditions chartered 50 Let Pobedy (which they refer to as 50 Years of Victory) for expeditions to the North Pole in 2008.

As of February 2013, Quark Expeditions as well as international polar cruise company Poseidon Expeditions were both offering North Pole cruises on 50 Let Pobedy. On 30 July 2013 50 Let Pobedy reached the North Pole for the 100th time in the history of icebreaker navigation during one of Poseidon Expeditions cruises.

In October 2013, the vessel carried the Olympic Flame to the North Pole, in the runup to the 2014 Winter Olympics

In August 2017, the vessel set a new record for transit time to the North Pole, making the journey from Murmansk to the Pole in 79 hours, arriving at 02:33 AM on 17 August 2017.
