= Rossiya (1983 icebreaker) =

Arktika-class icebreaker built in 1985

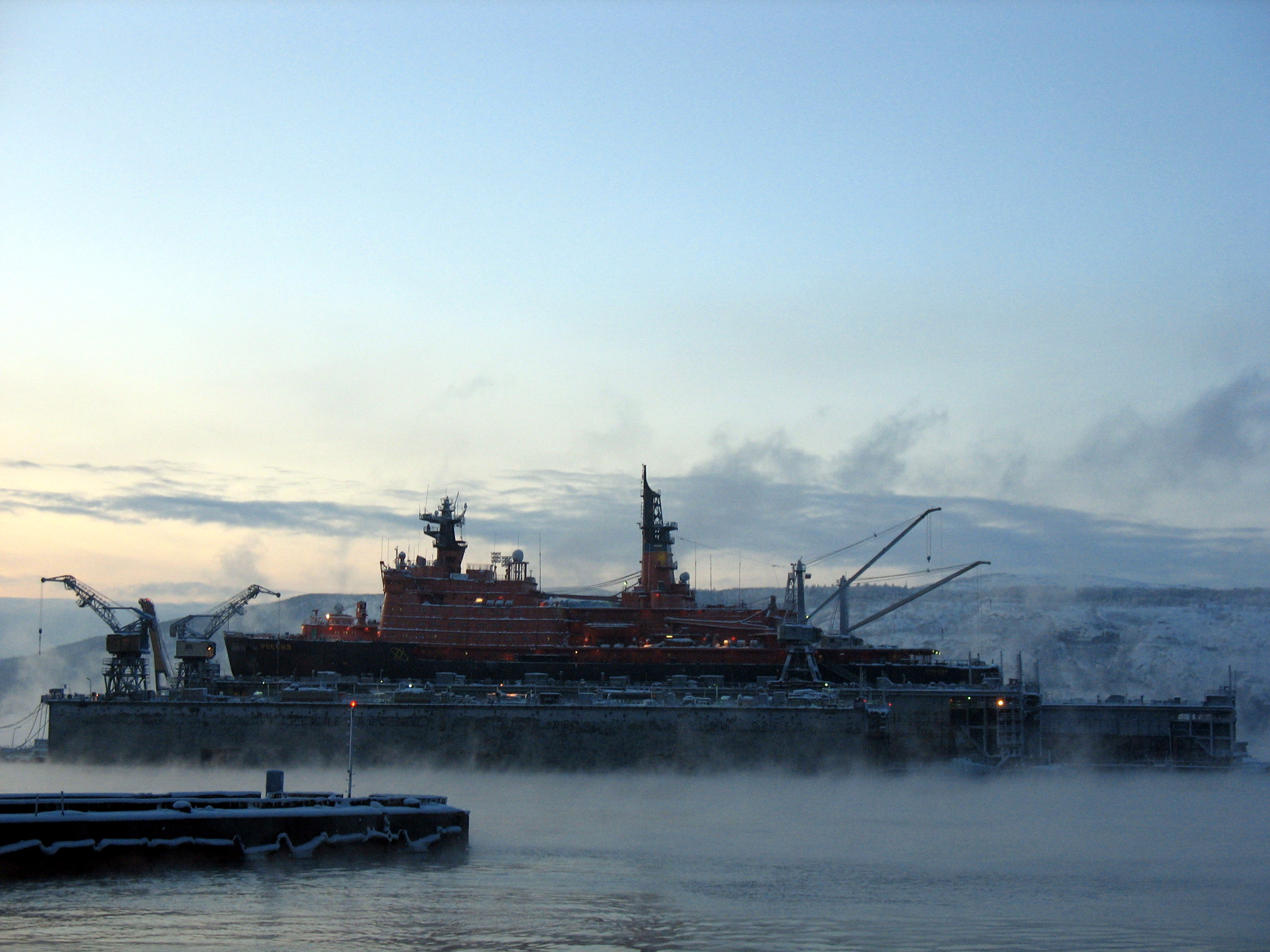
- Rossiya on a dry dock

History

Russia
- Name: Rossiya (Россия)
- Namesake: Russia
- Owner: Russian Federation
- Operator: FSUE Atomflot
- Port of registry: 1985–1992: Murmansk, Soviet Union; 1992 onwards: Murmansk, Russia
- Builder: Baltic Shipyard
- Yard number: 702
- Laid down: 20 February 1981
- Launched: 2 November 1983
- Commissioned: 20 December 1985
- Decommissioned: 2013
- In service: 1985–2013
- Identification: Call sign: UCJU; IMO number: 8424240; MMSI number: 273133400
- Status: Laid up

General characteristics
- Class & type: Arktika-class icebreaker
- Tonnage: 20,680 GT; 6,204 NT; 2,713 DWT
- Displacement: 23,000 tons
- Length: 148 m (486 ft)
- Beam: 30 m (98 ft)
- Draught: 11 m (36 ft)
- Depth: 17.2 m (56 ft)
- Ice class: RMRS Icebreaker9
- Installed power: Two OK-900A nuclear reactors (2 × 171 MW); Two steam turbogenerators (2 × 27.6 MW)
- Propulsion: Nuclear-turbo-electric; Three shafts (3 × 18 MW)
- Speed: 20.6 knots (38.2 km/h; 23.7 mph) (maximum)
- Endurance: 7.5 months
- Crew: 189
- Aircraft carried: 1 × Mi-2, Mi-8 or Ka-27 helicopter
- Aviation facilities: Helipad and hangar for one helicopter

Rossiya (Russian: Россия; literally: Russia) is a Russian Arktika-class nuclear-powered icebreaker. In 1990, it became the first ship to carry commercial passenger traffic to the geographic North Pole. Its sister ship Arktika was the first surface ship to reach the pole.

During the winter of 2012–2013, Rossiya was stationed in the Gulf of Finland.

According to Bellona, Rossiya was taken out of service in 2013 and is currently in "cold lay-up" awaiting disposal.
