= Arktika (1972 icebreaker) =

Russian Arktika-class icebreaker

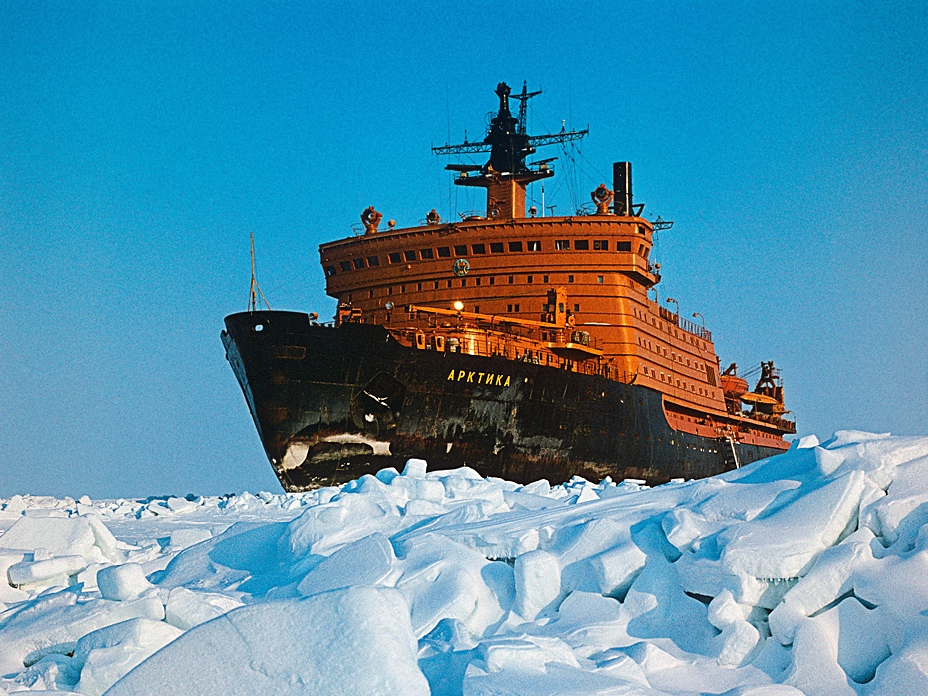
- Arktika in 1980

History

Russia
- Name: Arktika (Арктика)
- Owner: Russian Federation
- Operator: FSUE Atomflot
- Port of registry: Murmansk, Russia
- Builder: Baltic Shipyard
- Laid down: 3 July 1971
- Launched: 26 December 1972
- Commissioned: 25 April 1975
- Decommissioned: 2008
- In service: 1975–2008
- Identification: IMO number: 7429061; MMSI number: 273135500; Call sign: UCKH
- Status: Moored in Murmansk

General characteristics
- Class & type: Arktika-class icebreaker
- Tonnage: 18,172 GRT
- Displacement: 23,000 tons
- Length: 148 m (486 ft)
- Beam: 30 m (98 ft)
- Draught: 11 m (36 ft)
- Depth: 17.2 m (56 ft)
- Installed power: Two OK-900A nuclear reactors (2 × 171 MW); Two steam turbogenerators (2 × 27.6 MW)
- Propulsion: Nuclear-turbo-electric; Three shafts (3 × 18 MW)
- Speed: 18 knots (33 km/h; 21 mph) (maximum)
- Endurance: 7.5 months
- Crew: 189
- Aircraft carried: 1 × Mi-2, Mi-8 or Ka-27 helicopter
- Aviation facilities: Helipad and hangar for one helicopter

Arktika (Russian: А́рктика, IPA: [ˈarktʲɪkə]; literally: Arctic) is a retired nuclear-powered icebreaker of the Soviet (now Russian) Arktika class. In service from 1975 to 2008, she was the first surface ship to reach the North Pole, a feat achieved on August 17, 1977, during an expedition dedicated to the 60th anniversary of the October Revolution.

The Arktika is a double-hulled icebreaker; the outer hull is 48 millimetres (1.9 in) thick, the inner 25 millimetres (0.98 in) thick, with the space in between utilized for water ballasting. At the strongest point, the cast steel prow is 50 centimetres (20 in)) thick and bow-shaped to aid in icebreaking, the curve applying greater dynamic force to fracture the ice than a straight bow would. The maximum ice thickness it can break through is approximately 2.8 metres (9 ft 2 in). Arktika also has an air bubbling system (ABS) which delivers 24 m^{3}/s of steam from jets 9 metres (30 ft) below the surface to further aid in the breakup of ice.

The ship is divided by eight bulkheads, providing nine watertight compartments, and can undergo short towing operations when needed. It also comes equipped with a helicopter pad and hangar at the aft of the ship. Mil Mi-2 "Hoplite", dubbed ptichka (Russian for "little bird"), or Kamov Ka-27 "Helix" helicopters are used for scouting expeditions to find safe routes through the ice floes.

== Construction ==
Construction of the ship began in the Baltic Shipyard in Leningrad on July 3, 1971. Sea trials completed successfully on December 17, 1975. For further information on the ship's design, construction and propulsion system, see Arktika-class icebreaker.

== Renaming controversy ==
In 1982, she was rechristened Leonid Brezhnev in honour of Leonid Brezhnev, the General Secretary of the Central Committee of the Communist Party of the Soviet Union from 1964 until his death in 1982. In 1986 the name reverted to Arktika, according to some accounts because the ship's crew disliked the new name and refused to respond to radio messages unless the ship was referred to as Arktika. Within a week of the strike, the name was changed back. Another explanation is that the original name change had been due to an administrative mixup, and the name Leonid Brezhnev had never been supposed to apply to Arktika at all, but had been intended for a different ship.

== Service history ==
The vessel was in service from 1975 to 2008.

Arktika was retired for several years, but was repaired in the late 1990s.

Originally designed for 100,000 hours of reactor life, Arktika's service life was prolonged another 50,000 hours in 2000, and another 25,000 hours after that, adding eight years to a 25-year planned service life. The life extension was accomplished by means of replacing critical equipment to allow the safe and continued operation of the nuclear plant. On May 17, 2000, a conference of Russian engineers, scientists, and government officials took place on board Arktika after her first service extension. The extension cost only $4 million, compared to the $30–50 million cost of a new nuclear icebreaker, and proved to be a successful endeavor. The conference therefore concluded that the lifetimes of Russian nuclear icebreakers could be successfully extended to 175,000 hours, and possibly more.

On April 9, 2007, a fire broke out on Arktika. The fire caused minor damage to three cabins and knocked out an electricity-distribution panel. The nuclear reactor was not damaged. There were no injuries. The icebreaker was in the Kara Sea when the blaze erupted, and was sent to Murmansk.

== Withdrawal ==
After 33 years of reliable icebreaking, having become the first surface ship to reach the North Pole in 1977, and the first civilian ship to spend more than a year at sea without making port in 2000, and covering more than a million nautical miles by 2005, Arktika was retired in October 2008. She is docked at Atomflot, the nuclear base and dock in Murmansk, 1.5 kilometres (0.9 mi) away from the main docks, where she will remain until policies can be drawn up to dismantle her. In the meantime, she is a subject of important research, focused mainly on how to further extend the service life of the other Arktika-class icebreakers. There have been calls for the ship to be converted to a museum, either in Murmansk or St. Petersburg. An earlier Soviet nuclear icebreaker, Lenin, is already a museum ship in Murmansk.

== Gallery ==
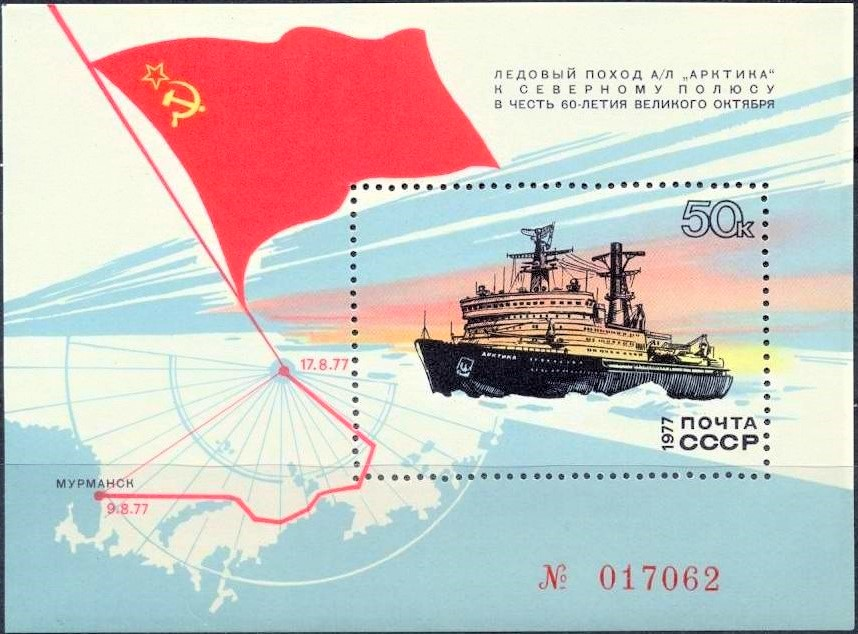
1977 Soviet miniature sheet dedicated to the expedition

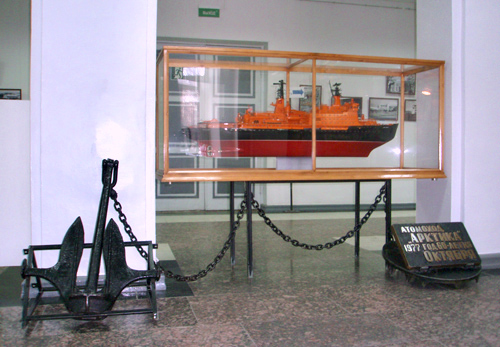
Memorial in honor of icebreaker Arktika's conquest of the North Pole in 1977, in hall of museum of local lore of the Murmansk region

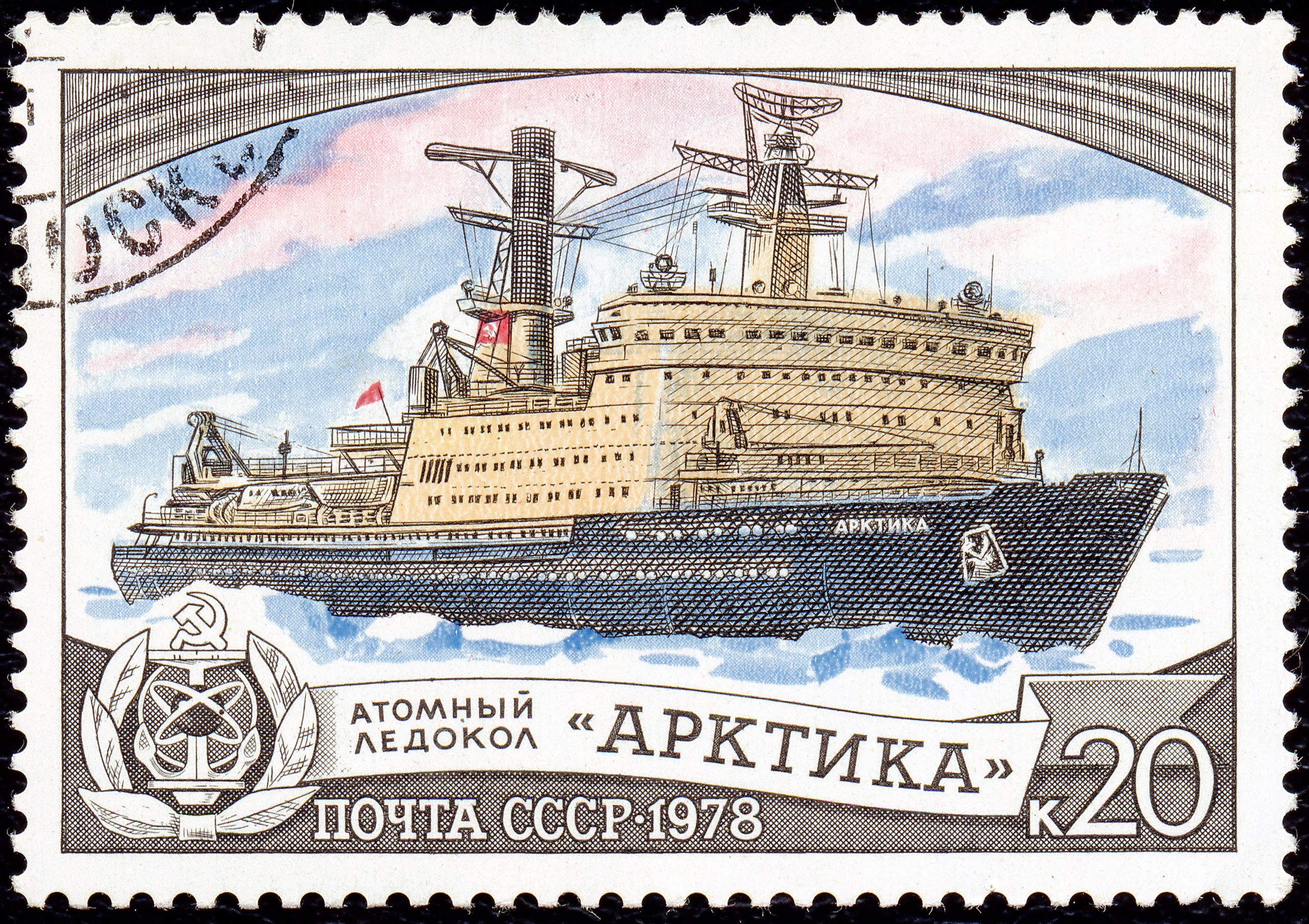
Arktika on a Soviet stamp

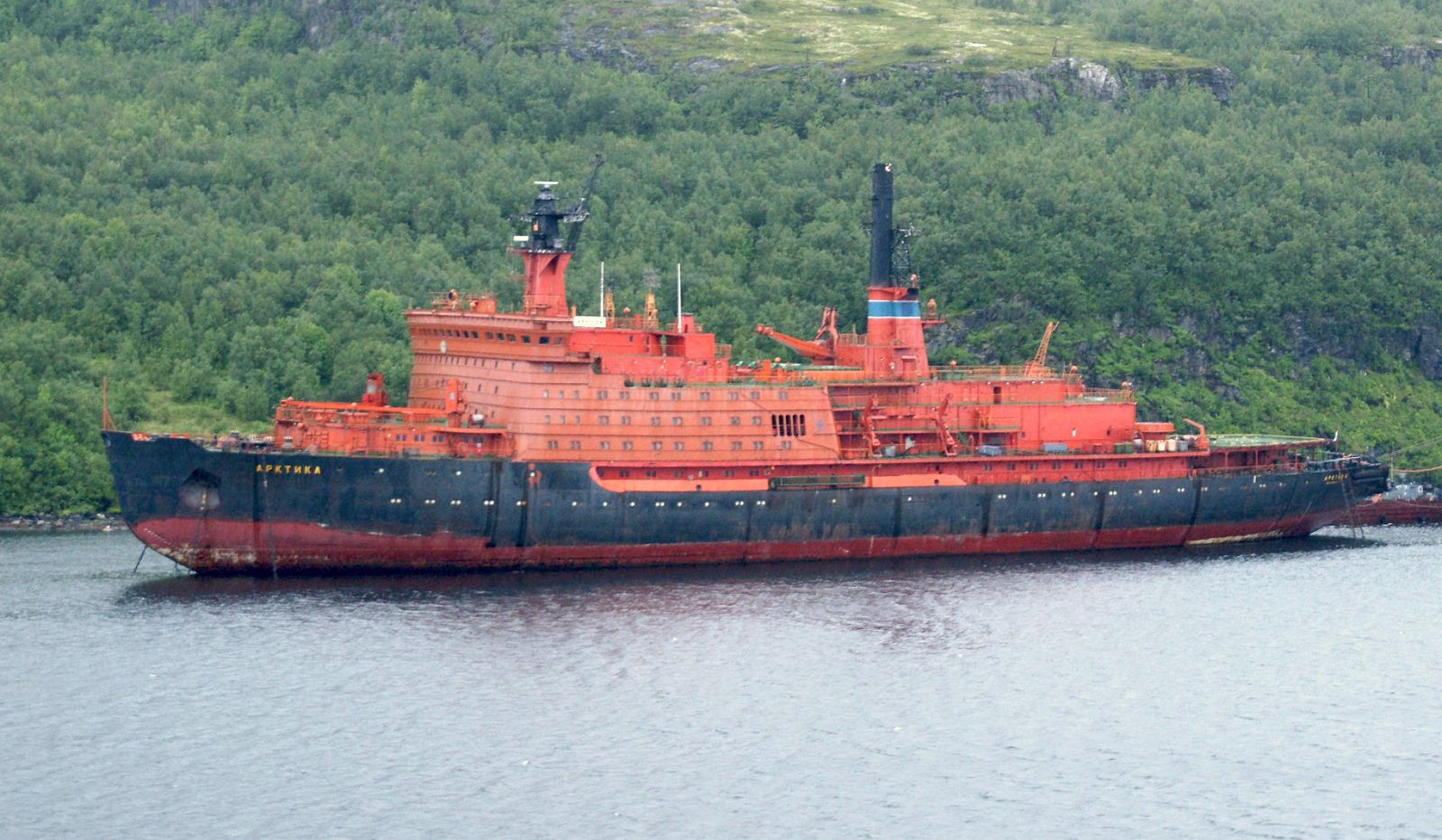
Arktika laid up at Murmansk, July 2012

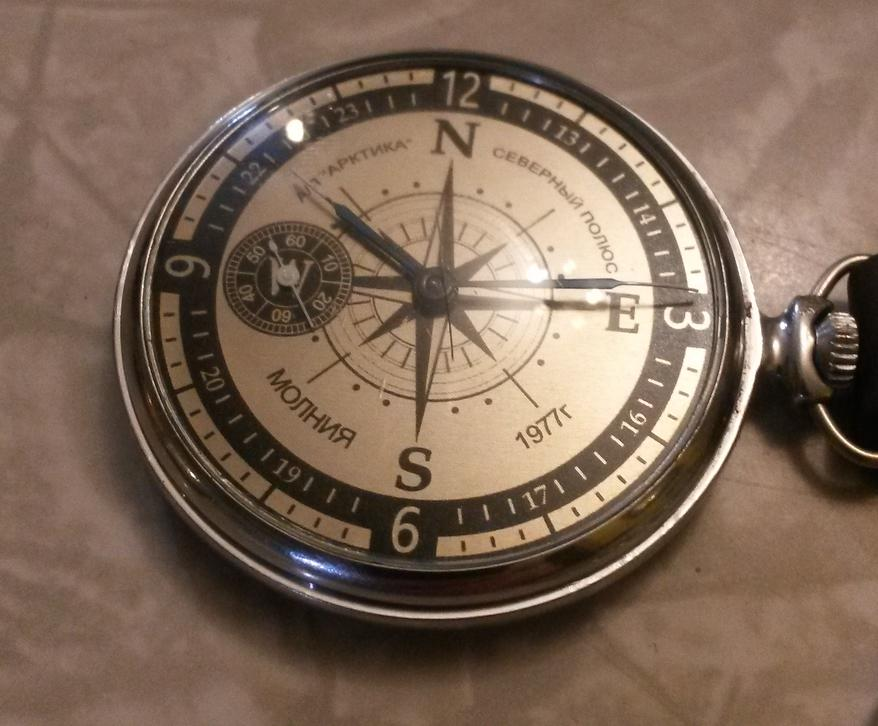
Pocket watch produced by Molnija to commemorate the expedition.
