= Taymyr (1987 icebreaker) =

Nuclear-powered shallow draft icebreaker

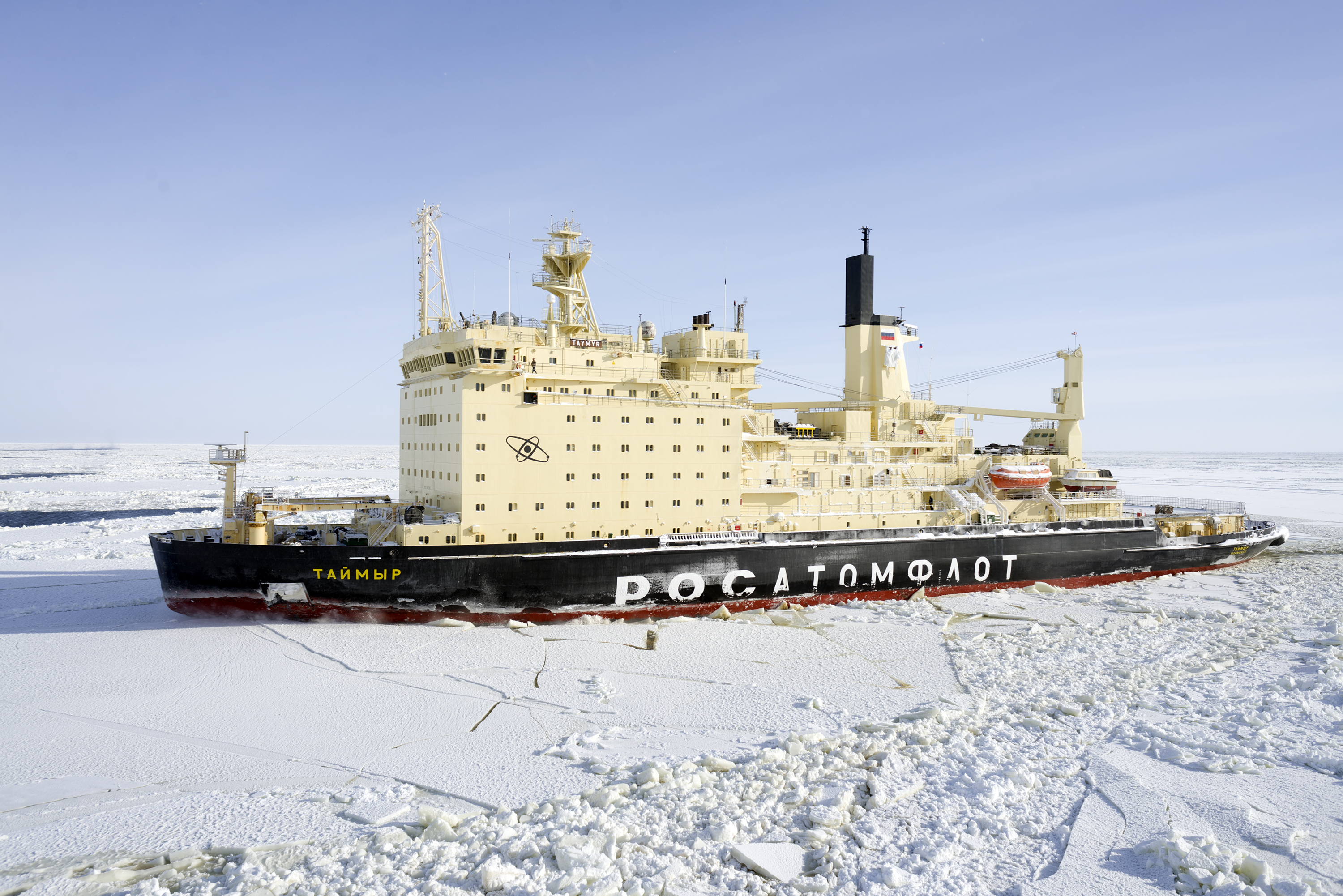
- Taymyr breaking ice in the Gulf of Ob in March 2015.

History

Russia
- Name: Taymyr (Таймыр)
- Namesake: Taymyr Peninsula
- Owner: Russian Federation
- Operator: FSUE Atomflot
- Port of registry: 1990–1992: Murmansk, Soviet Union; 1992 onwards: Murmansk, Russia
- Builder: Wärtsilä Marine, Helsinki Shipyard, Finland; Baltic Shipyard, Leningrad, Soviet Union
- Yard number: 474
- Laid down: January 1985
- Launched: 10 April 1987 (without reactor)
- Completed: 7 April 1988
- Commissioned: 30 June 1989
- Identification: IMO number: 8417481; MMSI number: 273135100; Call sign: UEMM
- Status: In service

General characteristics
- Class & type: Taymyr-class icebreaker
- Tonnage: 20,791 GT; 6,237 NT; 3,550 DWT
- Displacement: 21,000 tons
- Length: 151.8 m (498 ft)
- Beam: 29.2 m (96 ft)
- Draught: 7.5–9.0 m (24.6–29.5 ft)
- Depth: 15.68 m (51.4 ft)
- Ice class: RMRS LL2
- Installed power: KLT-40M nuclear reactor (171 MW); Two GTA 6421-OM5 turbogenerators (2 × 18,400 kW)
- Propulsion: Nuclear-turbo-electric (AC/AC); Three shafts (3 × 12 MW)
- Speed: 18.5 knots (34.3 km/h; 21.3 mph) (maximum)
- Endurance: 7.5 months
- Crew: 100+
- Aircraft carried: 1 × Ka-32 helicopter
- Aviation facilities: Helipad and hangar for one helicopter

Taymyr (Russian: Таймыр, IPA: [tɐjˈmɨr]) is a shallow-draft nuclear-powered icebreaker, and the first of two similar vessels. She was built in 1989 for the Soviet Union in Finland, at the Helsinki Shipyard by Wärtsilä Marine, by order of the Murmansk Shipping Company. Her sister ship is Vaygach.

== Design ==
=== General characteristics ===
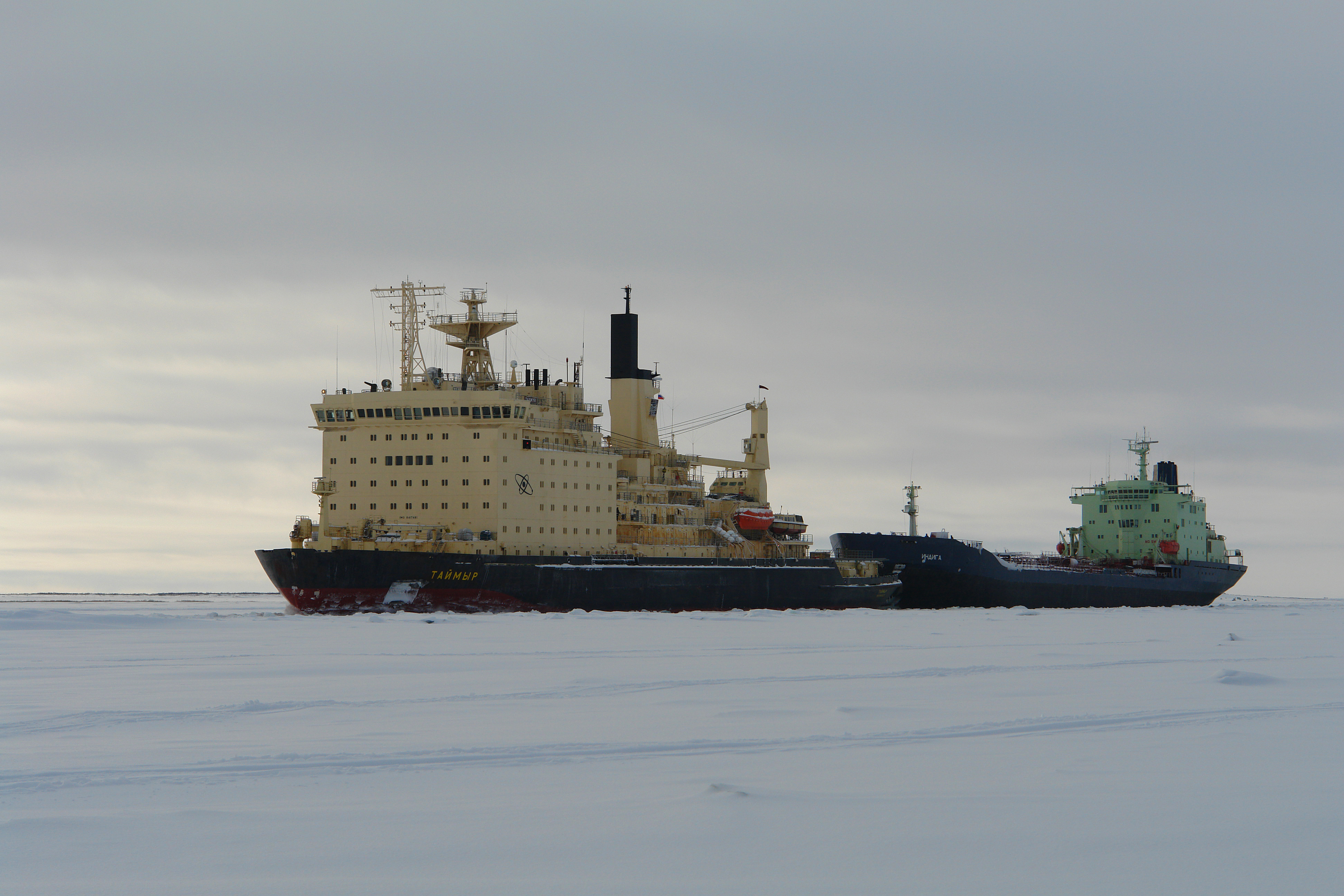
Taymyr escorting product tanker Indiga near the port of Dudinka.

While Taymyr is slightly smaller than the Arktika-class nuclear icebreakers, with an overall length of nearly 150 metres (490 ft) and beam of 28 metres (92 ft) she is still among the largest polar icebreakers ever built. At the maximum draught of 9 metres (30 ft), Taymyr has a displacement of 21,000 tons. However, she can also operate at a reduced draught of only 7.5 metres (25 ft).

Taymyr has a traditional icebreaker hull with highly raked stem and sloping sides to reduce the ice loads in compressive ice fields and improve maneuverability. The special cold-resistant steel used in the hull was delivered by the Soviet Union. Although designed for a crew of slightly over 100, the large superstructure of Taymyr contains accommodation and facilities for 138 personnel. In addition to messes and other social premises, there is a large auditorium that doubles as a recreational room and a winter garden that can be used to provide fresh vegetables for the crew during the polar night. In the aft, there is a helideck and a hangar for single Kamov Ka-32 helicopter. Being an escort icebreaker, Taymyr is equipped with a standard towing winch and a stern notch for close towing in difficult conditions.

Taymyr is classified by the Russian Maritime Register of Shipping with the Russian ice class LL2, which means that she is intended for icebreaking operations on Arctic coastal routes in level ice up to 2 metres (6.6 ft) thick during winter and spring. The shallow draught of the icebreaker allows it to operate in rivers, estuaries and other locations where the water is not deep enough for bigger Arktika-class icebreakers and the ice conditions are so severe that refueling of diesel-powered icebreakers would be difficult, even impossible.

When the Taymyr-class icebreakers were designed, considerable effort was put into improving the safety of these nuclear-powered ships. The vessels were designed to operate in areas where there might be only 80 centimetres (31 in) of water beneath the keel, less than the thickness of the ice floes the icebreaking bow is pushing under the ship. The scenarios used for structural dimensioning of the reactor compartment and shielding included a 25,000-ton SA-15 type arctic freighter striking the icebreaker amidships at 7 knots (13 km/h; 8.1 mph). Furthermore, all critical systems are duplicated to improve reliability and allow the ship to maintain most of its operational capability after a collision.

=== Power and propulsion ===
Taymyr is powered by a single KLT-40M nuclear fission reactor located amidships with a thermal output of 171 MW. The nuclear power plant on board the icebreaker produces superheated steam, which is used to generate electricity for the propulsion motors and other shipboard consumers as well as heat to maintain operational capability at −50 °C (−58 °F). Taymyr has two main turbogenerators aft of the reactor compartment consisting of Soviet-made steam turbines coupled to Siemens generators, each producing 18,400 kW of electricity at 3,000 rpm for the propulsion motors. In addition the ship has two auxiliary turbogenerators, manufactured in the Soviet Union, which produce 2,000 kW of electrical power for shipboard consumers.

Taymyr has a nuclear-turbo-electric powertrain, in which steam produced by the nuclear reactor is converted first into electricity, which in turn rotates the propulsion motors coupled to the propellers. The ship has three shafts with 12,000 kW (16,000 hp) Strömberg AC motors controlled by cycloconverters. The propulsion motors are coupled directly to four-bladed fixed pitch propellers rotating at 180 rpm. The ship can maintain a speed of 18.5 knots (34.3 km/h; 21.3 mph) in open water and 3 knots (5.6 km/h; 3.5 mph) in 2.2-metre (7 ft) level ice.

If the nuclear power can not be utilized, electricity can also be produced by three 16-cylinder Wärtsilä 16V22 medium-speed diesel engines coupled to 3,200 kVA Strömberg alternators. Two of the three generating sets, located ahead of the reactor compartment under the superstructure, can be used to provide approximately 4 MW of power for the propulsion motors while the third takes care of the auxiliary load. In case of emergency Vaygach also has two 200 kW emergency diesel generators of Soviet origin.

Taymyr and her sister ship are one of the last icebreakers equipped with Wärtsilä Air Bubbling System (WABS). When pressurized air released from nozzles located below the waterline, it lubricates the hull and, by reducing friction between steel and ice, improves the ship's ability to operate in difficult ice conditions such as pressure ridges and reduces the risk of becoming stuck in ice.

== Radioactivity release ==
In the spring of 2011 a minor release of radioactivity was detected in the ship's reactor ventilation system – the second such leak on board the vessel in as many years. Taymyr returned to Murmansk under diesel power for repair. By then 6,000 litres of coolant had leaked from its nuclear reactor.

== See also ==
- Arktika-class icebreaker
