= Sibir (1977 icebreaker) =

Russian Arktika-class icebreaker

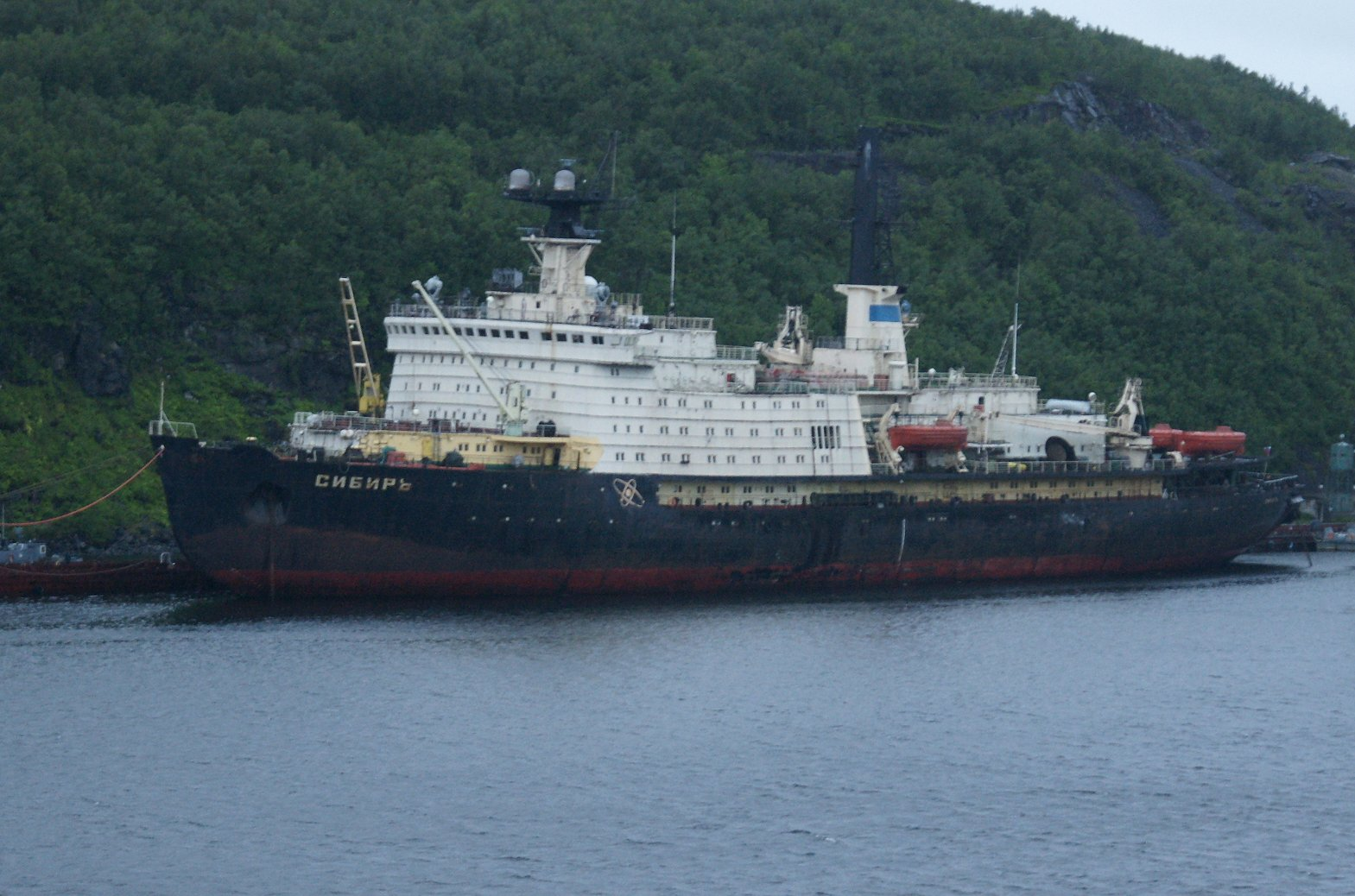
- Sibir in 2012

History

Russia
- Name: Sibir (Сибирь)
- Namesake: Siberia
- Owner: Russian Federation
- Operator: FSUE Atomflot
- Port of registry: 1977–1992: Murmansk, Soviet Union; 1992 onwards: Murmansk, Russia
- Builder: Baltic Shipyard
- Yard number: 701
- Laid down: 26 June 1974
- Launched: 23 February 1976
- Commissioned: 28 December 1977
- Decommissioned: 1992
- In service: 1977–1992
- Identification: Call sign: UWDS; IMO number: 7604491; MMSI number: 273138200
- Status: Being demolished

General characteristics
- Class & type: Arktika-class icebreaker
- Tonnage: 20,665 GT; 4,096 DWT
- Displacement: 23,000 tons
- Length: 148 m (486 ft)
- Beam: 30 m (98 ft)
- Draught: 11 m (36 ft)
- Depth: 17.2 m (56 ft)
- Installed power: Two OK-900A nuclear reactors (2 × 171 MW); Two steam turbogenerators (2 × 27.6 MW)
- Propulsion: Nuclear-turbo-electric; Three shafts (3 × 18 MW)
- Speed: 20.6 knots (38.2 km/h; 23.7 mph) (maximum)
- Endurance: 7.5 months
- Crew: 189
- Aircraft carried: 1 × Mi-2, Mi-8 or Ka-27 helicopter
- Aviation facilities: Helipad and hangar for one helicopter

Sibir (Russian: Сибирь; literally: Siberia), built in 1977, is a retired Russian nuclear-powered icebreaker of the Arktika class. She was the only icebreaker of her class that does not feature a red superstructure.

The ship was equipped with two OK-900A nuclear reactors, each producing 171 MW of thermal power. The reactors were in operation from 1977 to 1992. The reactors powered two steam turbines to which six generators were connected. The radiation intensity was always monitored using sensors distributed throughout the ship.

Sibir was withdrawn from service in 1992 and was reported in 2012 as being moored at Murmansk awaiting scrapping.

She had a gross tonnage of 20,655 and a dead weight of 4,096 tonnes.
