= Lenin (1957 icebreaker) =

Soviet nuclear-powered icebreaker

Coordinates: 68°58′28.98″N 33°3′32.21″E

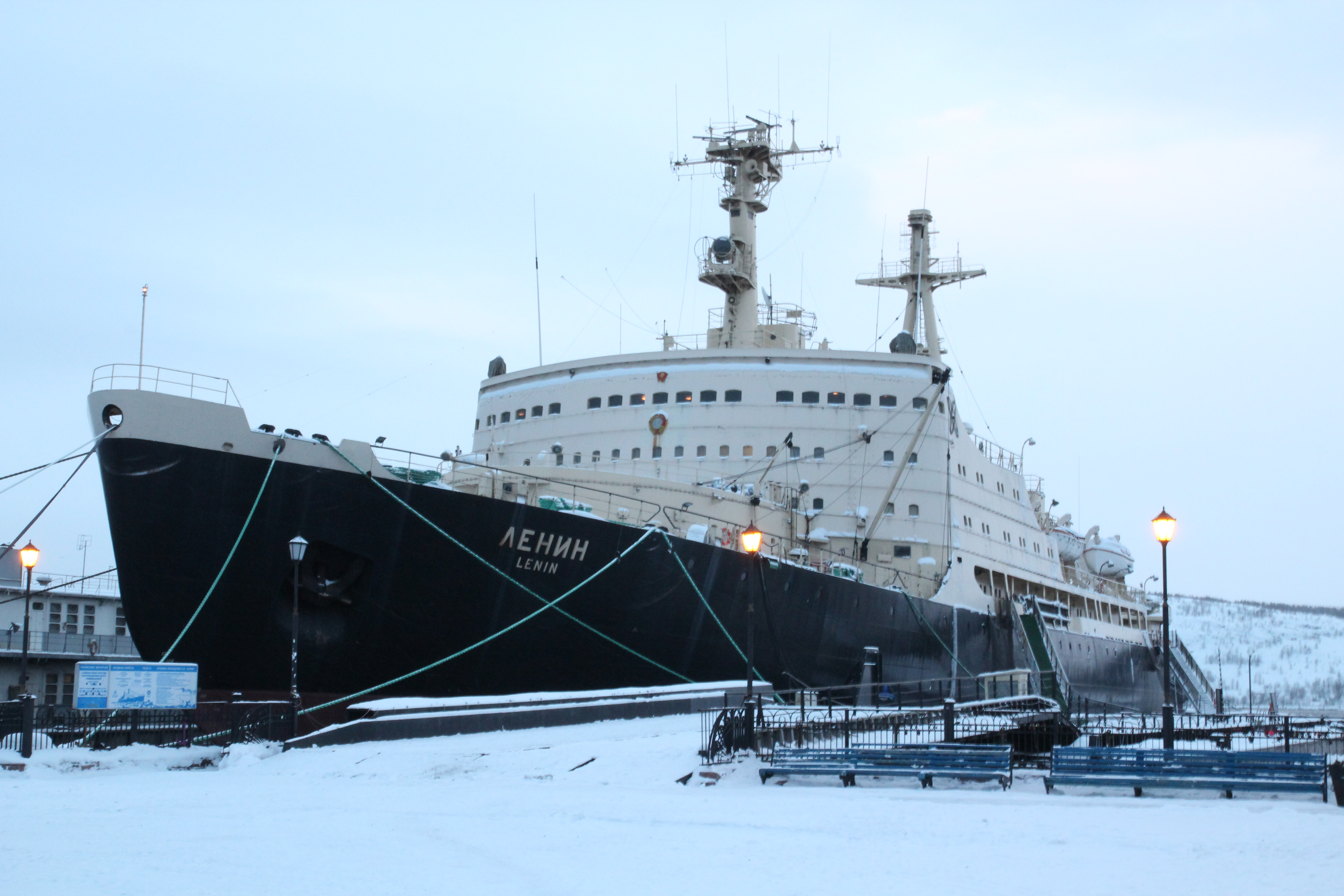
- Lenin docked at Murmansk

History

Soviet Union
- Name: Lenin (Ленин)
- Namesake: Vladimir Lenin
- Builder: Admiralty Shipyards, Leningrad USSR
- Launched: 1957
- Completed: 1959
- In service: 1959–1989
- Identification: IMO number: 5206087
- Status: Preserved as a museum ship

General characteristics
- Displacement: 16,000 tonnes
- Length: 134 m (440 ft)
- Beam: 27.6 m (91 ft)
- Draught: 10.5 m (34 ft)
- Depth: 16.1 m (53 ft)
- Installed power: Three OK-150 nuclear reactors (3 × 90 MW) (until 1970); Two OK-900 nuclear reactors (2 × 171 MW) (since 1970); Four steam turbine generators
- Propulsion: Nuclear-turbo-electric, three shafts
- Speed: 18 knots (33 km/h; 21 mph)
- Crew: 243
- Aviation facilities: Helipad

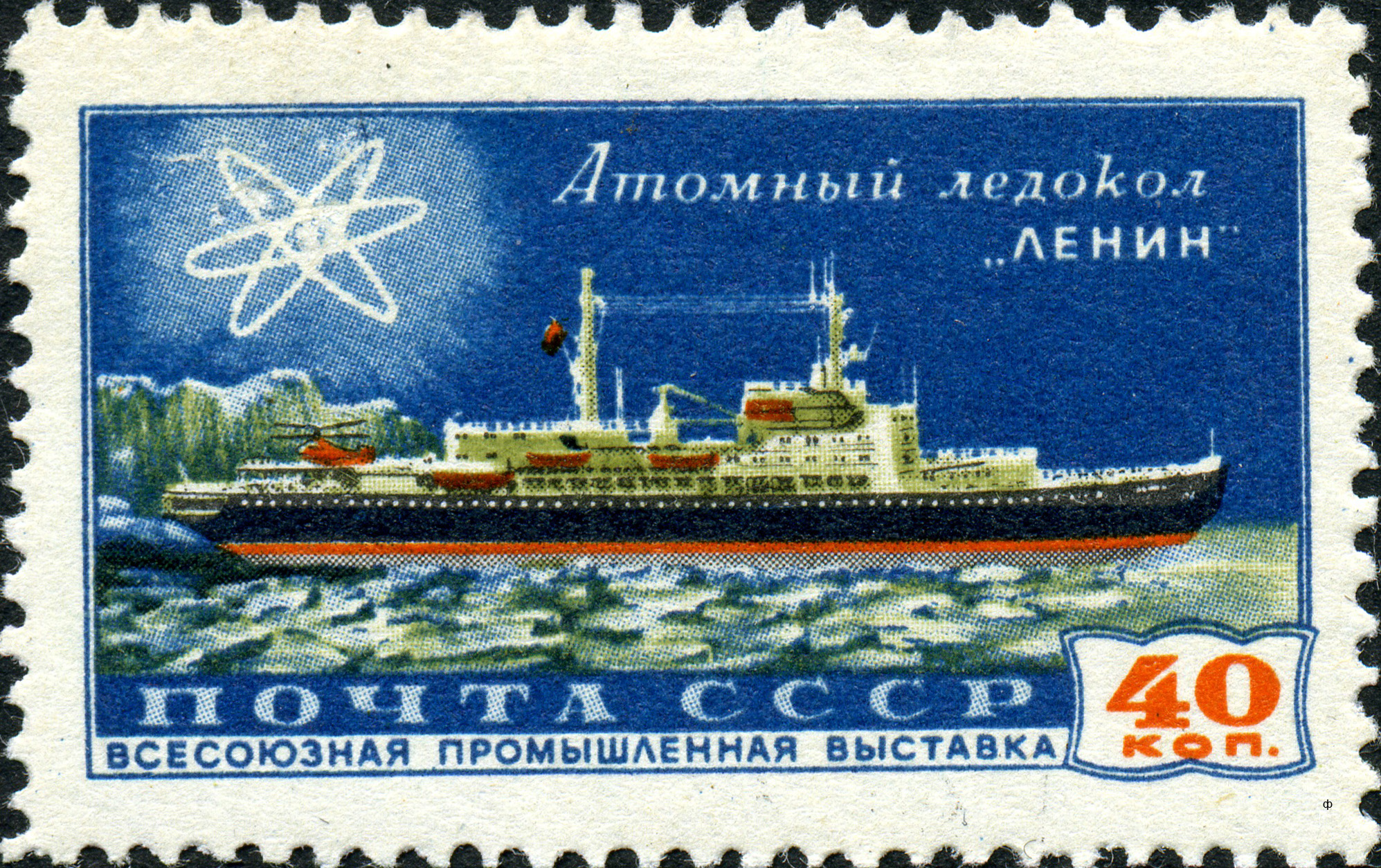
Lenin on a 1958 stamp

Lenin (Russian: Ленин) is a Soviet nuclear-powered icebreaker, the first nuclear-powered icebreaker in the world. Launched in 1957, it is both the world's first nuclear-powered surface ship and the first nuclear-powered civilian vessel. Lenin entered operation in 1959 and worked clearing sea routes for cargo ships along Russia's northern coast. From 1960 to 1965 the ship covered over 157,000 kilometres (85,000 nautical miles) during the Arctic navigation season, of which almost 120,000 km (65,000 nmi) was through ice. Nuclear power proved to be an ideal technology for a vessel working in such a remote area as it removed the need for regular replenishment of fuel. On 10 April 1974 the vessel was awarded the Order of Lenin. It was officially decommissioned in 1989. It was subsequently converted to a museum ship and is now permanently based at Murmansk.

== Propulsion ==
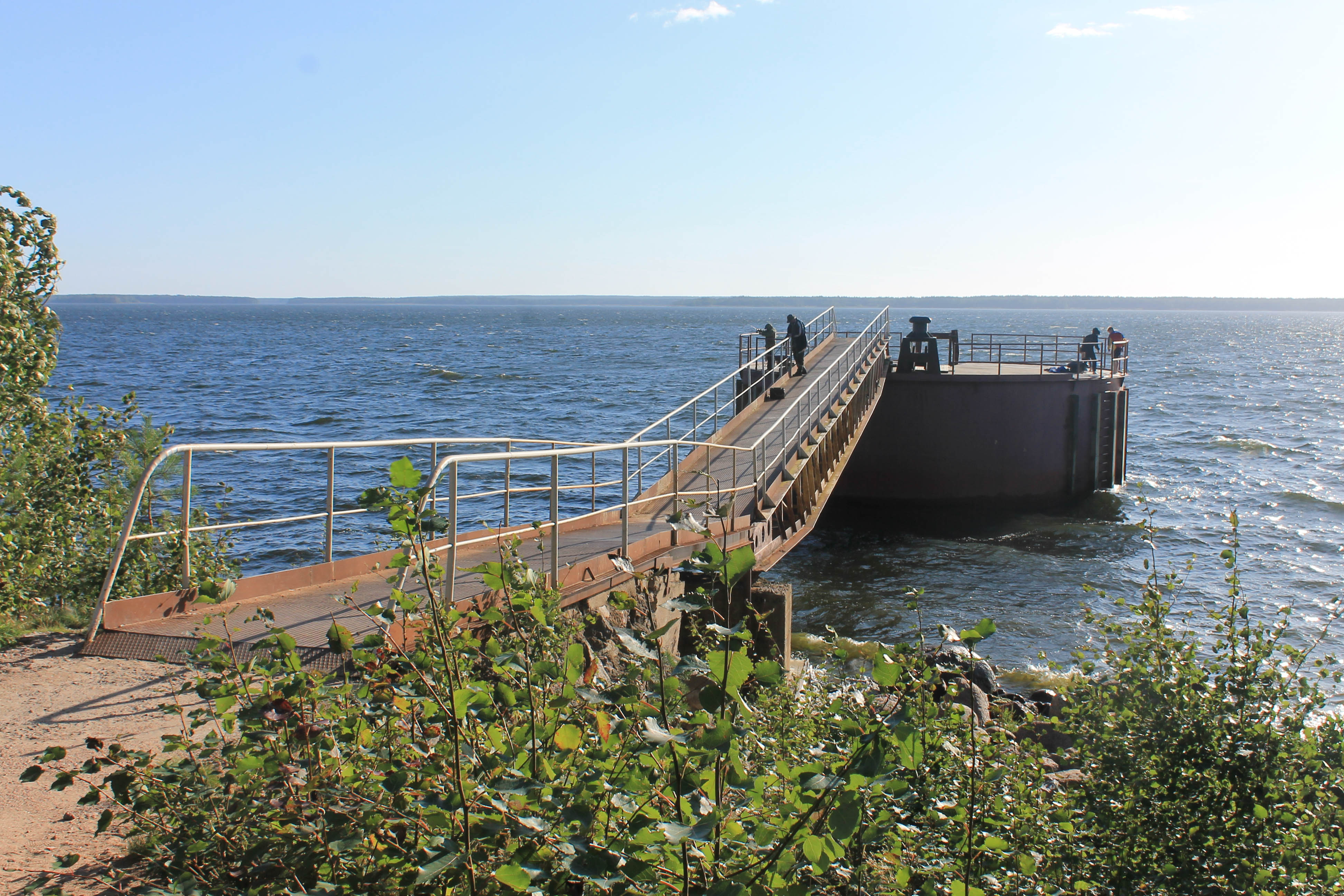
Pier near Primorsk where Lenin underwent sea trials

When launched in 1957, Lenin was powered by three OK-150 reactors. In its late-1960s configuration, at full capacity the ship used 2.5 to 3 kg (five to six pounds) of uranium-235 per 100 days.

In the configuration employed from 1970, two OK-900 reactors provided steam for four steam turbines, that were in turn connected to generators, which powered three sets of electric motors to drive the ship's three propellers.

== Nuclear accidents ==
In February 1965, there was a loss-of-coolant accident. After being shut down for refueling, the coolant was removed from the number two reactor before the spent fuel had been removed. As a result, some of the fuel elements melted and deformed inside the reactor. When the spent elements were being unloaded for storage and disposal, it was found that 124 fuel assemblies (about 60% of the total) were stuck in the reactor core. It was decided to remove the fuel, control grid, and control rods as a unit for disposal; they were placed in a special cask, solidified, stored for two years, and dumped in Tsivolki Bay (near the Novaya Zemlya archipelago) in 1967.

The second accident was a cooling system leak which occurred in 1967, shortly after refueling. Finding the leak required breaking through the concrete and metal biological shield with sledgehammers. Once the leak was found, it became apparent that the sledgehammer damage could not be repaired; subsequently, all three reactors were removed by blowing them off the ship with shaped charges above a burial site off Novaya Zemlya, and replaced by two OK-900 reactors. This was completed in early 1970.

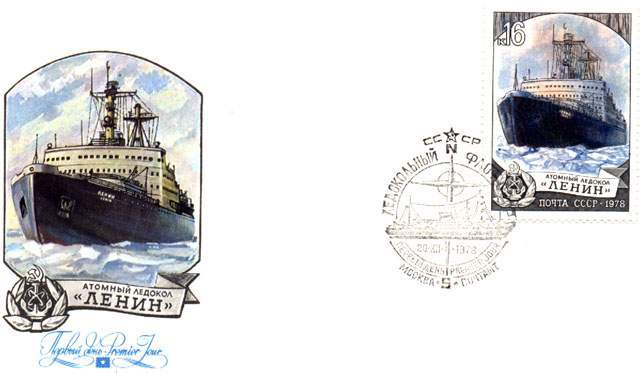
A 1978 Soviet Union postage stamp featured the Icebreaker Lenin

== Retirement ==
Lenin was decommissioned in 1989, because its hull had worn thin from ice friction. She was laid up at Atomflot, a base for nuclear icebreakers in Murmansk, and repair and conversion into a museum ship was completed in 2005.
