= Vaygach (1989 icebreaker) =

Russian nuclear-powered icebreaker

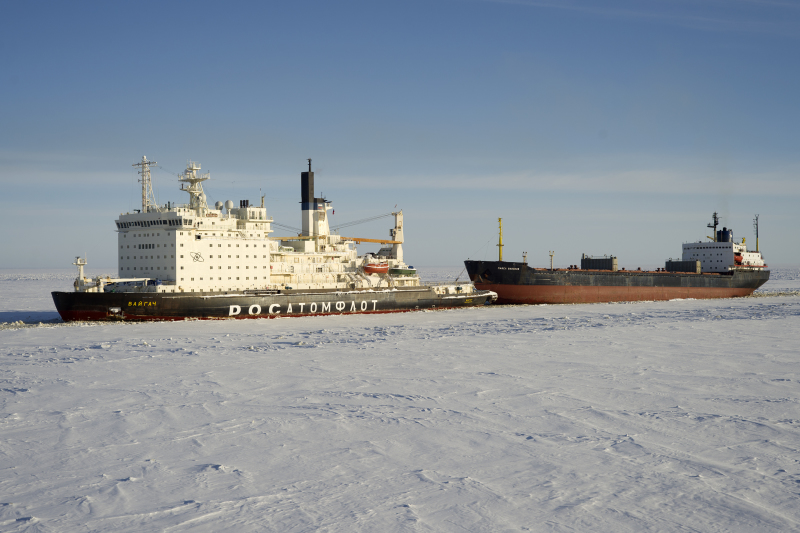
- Vaygach escorting Pavel Vavilov from the port of Sabetta in April 2015

History

Russia
- Name: Vaygach (Вайгач)
- Namesake: Vaygach Island
- Owner: Russian Federation
- Operator: FSUE Atomflot
- Port of registry: 1990–1992: Murmansk, Soviet Union; 1992 onwards: Murmansk, Russia
- Builder: Wärtsilä Marine, Helsinki Shipyard, Finland; Baltic Shipyard, Leningrad, Soviet Union
- Yard number: 475
- Launched: 26 February 1988
- Commissioned: 1 August 1990
- Identification: IMO number: 8417493; MMSI number: 273133100; Call sign: UBNY
- Status: In service

General characteristics
- Class & type: Taymyr-class icebreaker
- Tonnage: 20,791 GT; 6,237 NT; 3,550 DWT
- Displacement: 21,000 tons
- Length: 151.8 m (498 ft)
- Beam: 29.2 m (96 ft)
- Draught: 7.5–9.0 m (24.6–29.5 ft)
- Depth: 15.68 m (51.4 ft)
- Ice class: RMRS LL2
- Installed power: KLT-40M nuclear reactor (171 MW); Two GTA 6421-OM5 turbogenerators (2 × 18,400 kW)
- Propulsion: Nuclear-turbo-electric (AC/AC); Three shafts (3 × 12 MW)
- Speed: 18.5 knots (34.3 km/h; 21.3 mph) (maximum)
- Endurance: 7.5 months
- Crew: 100+
- Aircraft carried: 1 × Ka-32 helicopter
- Aviation facilities: Helipad and hangar for one helicopter

Vaygach (Russian: Вайгач, IPA: [vɐjˈɡatɕ]) is a shallow-draught nuclear-powered icebreaker. She was built in 1989 for the Soviet Union by Wärtsilä Marine Helsinki Shipyard in Finland by order of the Murmansk Shipping Company and its KL-40 reactor was installed at the Baltic Shipyard in St. Petersburg. Her sister ship is Taymyr.

== Career ==
Vaygach is a shallow-draught nuclear-powered icebreaker of Project 10580 Taimyr. It is named after the early 20th century hydrographic icebreaker of the same name. Vaygach was built in Finland in 1989 and its KL-40 reactor was installed at the Baltic Shipyard in St. Petersburg. Entered service in July 1990.

Vaygach underwent work on its steam generator No. 3 in February 2003 as a defect in steam generator was found.

On 15 December 2011, two crew members died and a third one was seriously injured in a fire on board Vaygach while the icebreaker was escorting merchant ships from Dudinka to Murmansk. The fire, which started in one of the crew cabins presumably due to negligence and was extinguished by the crew by 03:58 am Moscow time, did not cause any damage to the ship's nuclear reactor. The two killed were 32-year-old machinist Pavel Bazhukov, and 55-year-old ship instrumentation and control foreman Valery Morozov. Technician Alexander Shevchenko sustained burns to his upper respiratory tract

On 25 December 2015, Vaygach completed the fastest transit of the Northern Sea Route. It took just 7 1/2 days to complete the trip. It left from the Siberian side of the Bering Strait on December 17, covering more than 2,200 nautical miles before reaching its destination in the White Sea on December 25.

On 31 March 2016, Vaygach received a 200,000-hour engineered lifespan extension on its reactor machine-building enterprise of the state corporation Rosatom JSC Afrikantov OKBM, meaning the vessel could continue running until 2023 as the country builds its next generation of nuclear icebreaking vessels,

In 2018, the reactor on the Vaygach nuclear icebreaker steamed past what many thought a near impossible barrier, reaching 177,205 hours of operating time – beating the record set by the Arktika nuclear icebreaker, whose reactor had run for one hour less when it was retired in 2008. That's 7,383 and a half straight days, or just over 20 years.

The event was widely reported in Russia's official press, which elevated what had until then been an unremarkable Arctic workhorse to heroic status.

In 2019, Nornickel and Gazprom Neft signed a 10 year long lease agreement with Rosatom for exclusive rights to apply the Taymyr and Vaygach until the end of the vessels’ service lives. Both ships are due to be taken out of service in 2029 at the latest.

== Design ==
=== General characteristics ===
While Vaygach is slightly smaller than the Arktika-class nuclear icebreakers, with an overall length of nearly 150 metres (490 ft) and beam of 28 metres (92 ft) she is still among the largest polar icebreakers ever built. At the maximum draught of 9 metres (30 ft), Vaygach has a displacement of 21,000 tons. However, she can also operate at a reduced draught of only 7.5 metres (25 ft).

Vaygach has a traditional icebreaker hull with highly raked stem and sloping sides to reduce the ice loads in compressive ice fields and improve maneuverability. The special cold-resistant steel used in the hull was delivered by the Soviet Union. Although designed for a crew of slightly over 100, the large superstructure of Vaygach contains accommodation and facilities for 138 personnel. In addition to messes and other social premises, there is a large auditorium that doubles as a recreational room and a winter garden that can be used to provide fresh vegetables for the crew during the polar night. In the aft, there is a helideck and a hangar for single Kamov Ka-32 helicopter. Being an escort icebreaker, Vaygach is equipped with a standard towing winch and a stern notch for close towing in difficult conditions.

Vaygach is classified by the Russian Maritime Register of Shipping with the Russian ice class LL2, which means that she is intended for icebreaking operations on Arctic coastal routes in level ice up to 2 metres (6.6 ft) thick during winter and spring. The shallow draught of the icebreaker allows it to operate in rivers, estuaries and other locations where the water is not deep enough for bigger Arktika-class icebreakers and the ice conditions are so severe that refueling of diesel-powered icebreakers would be difficult, even impossible.

When the Taymyr-class icebreakers were designed, considerable effort was put into improving the safety of these nuclear-powered ships. The vessels were designed to operate in areas where there might be only 80 centimetres (31 in) of water beneath the keel, less than the thickness of the ice floes the icebreaking bow is pushing under the ship. The scenarios used for structural dimensioning of the reactor compartment and shielding included a 25,000-ton SA-15 type arctic freighter striking the icebreaker amidships at 7 knots (13 km/h; 8.1 mph). Furthermore, all critical systems are duplicated to improve reliability and allow the ship to maintain most of its operational capability after a collision.

=== Power and propulsion ===
Vaygach is powered by a single KLT-40M nuclear fission reactor located amidships with a thermal output of 171 MW. The nuclear power plant on board the icebreaker produces superheated steam, which is used to generate electricity for the propulsion motors and other shipboard consumers as well as heat to maintain operational capability at −50 °C (−58 °F). Vaygach has two main turbogenerators aft of the reactor compartment consisting of Soviet-made steam turbines coupled to Siemens generators, each producing 18,400 kW of electricity at 3,000 rpm for the propulsion motors. In addition the ship has two auxiliary turbogenerators, manufactured in the Soviet Union, which produce 2,000 kW of electrical power for shipboard consumers.

Vaygach has a nuclear-turbo-electric powertrain, in which steam produced by the nuclear reactor is converted first into electricity, which in turn rotates the propulsion motors coupled to the propellers. The ship has three shafts with 12,000 kW (16,000 hp) Strömberg AC motors controlled by cycloconverters. The propulsion motors are coupled directly to four-bladed fixed pitch propellers rotating at 180 rpm. The ship can maintain a speed of 18.5 knots (34.3 km/h; 21.3 mph) in open water and 3 knots (5.6 km/h; 3.5 mph) in 2.2-metre (7 ft) level ice.

If the nuclear power can not be utilized, electricity can also be produced by three 16-cylinder Wärtsilä 16V22 medium-speed diesel engines coupled to 3,200 kVA Strömberg alternators. Two of the three generating sets, located ahead of the reactor compartment under the superstructure, can be used to provide approximately 4 MW of power for the propulsion motors while the third takes care of the auxiliary load. In case of emergency Vaygach also has two 200 kW emergency diesel generators of Soviet origin.

Vaygach and her sister ship are one of the last icebreakers equipped with Wärtsilä Air Bubbling System (WABS). When pressurized air released from nozzles located below the waterline, it lubricates the hull and, by reducing friction between steel and ice, improves the ship's ability to operate in difficult ice conditions such as pressure ridges and reduces the risk of becoming stuck in ice.

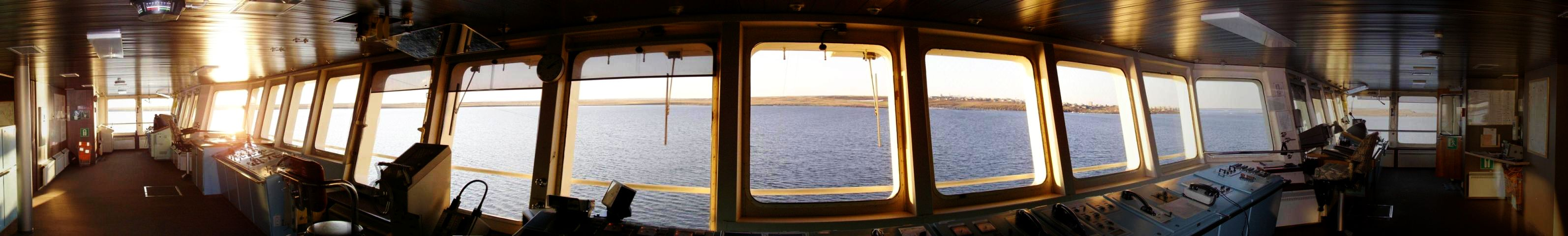
Interior view

== See also ==
- Arktika-class icebreaker
