= OK-150 reactor =

Soviet marine nuclear reactor

The OK-150 reactor (1st generation) and its successor, the OK-900 reactor (2nd generation) are Soviet marine nuclear reactors used to power ships at sea. They are pressurized water reactors (PWRs) that use enriched uranium-235 fuel. They have been used in various Russian nuclear-powered icebreaker ships. The reactor was developed by OKBM.

OK-150 specifications:

- Fuel: 5% enriched uranium in the form of ceramic uranium dioxide (UO_{2}) fuel elements with a cladding. Different cladding materials were used; initially zirconium, later on, stainless steel as well as a zirconium-niobium alloy were tried.
- Fuel load: 75 to 85 kilograms
- Power production: 90 megawatts

Distilled water was used for heat transfer and as a moderator. The core was 1.6 m high by 1 m diameter. It consisted of 219 fuel assemblies, totalling 7,704 fuel pins. There was a biological shield made of concrete mixed with metal shavings.

OK-900A specifications:

- Fuel: 35-40% enriched uranium in the form of metallic uranium-zirconium alloy fuel elements
- Fuel load: 150.7 kg
- Power production: 171 megawatts

Three OK-150s were used to power the Soviet icebreaker Lenin at the time of its launch in 1957. Later, after damage caused by nuclear accidents in 1965 and 1967, these were removed and replaced with two OK-900s.
