= Ukraina-class motorship =

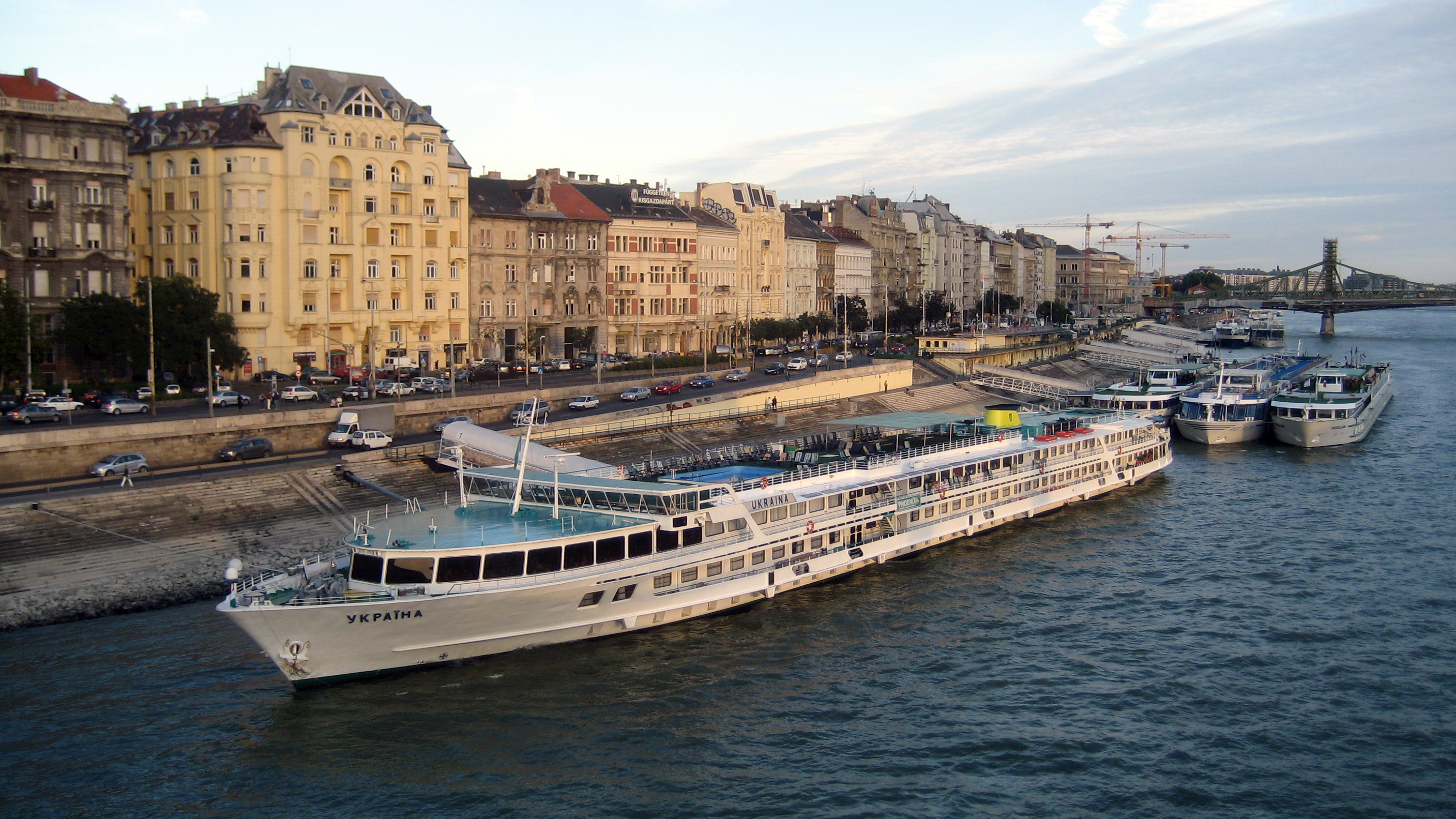
- River cruise ship Ukraina in Budapest in 2008

Class overview
- Builders: Österreichische Schiffswerften AG, Korneuburg, Austria
- Built: 1979
- Planned: 2
- Building: 2
- Completed: 2
- Active: 2

General characteristics
- Tonnage: 3,200 GT
- Length: 115.66 m (379.5 ft)
- Beam: 16.98 m (55.7 ft)
- Draught: 1.56 m (5.1 ft)
- Decks: 2 passenger decks
- Installed power: 2 × MWM TbD 440-8K 1,720 kilowatts (2,310 hp)
- Propulsion: 2
- Speed: 24 km/h (15 mph; 13 kn)
- Capacity: 232 passengers
- Crew: 86

Ukraina class is a class of Russian river passenger ships. It is named after the first ship in the class Ukraina, which in her turn was named after Ukraine.

Three-deck cruise ships manufactured by Österreichische Schiffswerften AG at their shipyard in Korneuburg, Austria in 1979.

== River cruise ships of the Austrian project Q-003 ==
Ukraina-class motorships
No.	Original name	English transliteration
1	Украина (Україна)	Ukraina (Ukraina)
2	Молдавия (Молдавiя)	Moldavia (Moldavia)

== Overview ==
Ukraina class
Month and year of build	Hull No	Image	Name	Operator	Port of Registry	Flag	Status
1979	K715		Ukraina		Izmail	→	RSU 2-600766; ENI 42000001
1979	K716		Moldavia		Izmail	→	RSU 2–601782;ENI 42000002

== See also ==
- List of river cruise ships
- Valerian Kuybyshev-class motorship
- Rossiya-class motorship (1952)
- Rossiya-class motorship (1973)
- Anton Chekhov-class motorship
- Vladimir Ilyich-class motorship
- Rodina-class motorship
- Baykal-class motorship
- Sergey Yesenin-class motorship
- Oktyabrskaya Revolyutsiya-class motorship
- Yerofey Khabarov-class motorship
- Dunay-class motorship
- Volga-class motorship
- Amur-class motorship
- Dmitriy Furmanov-class motorship
