= Amur-class motorship =

Class of Russian river passenger ships

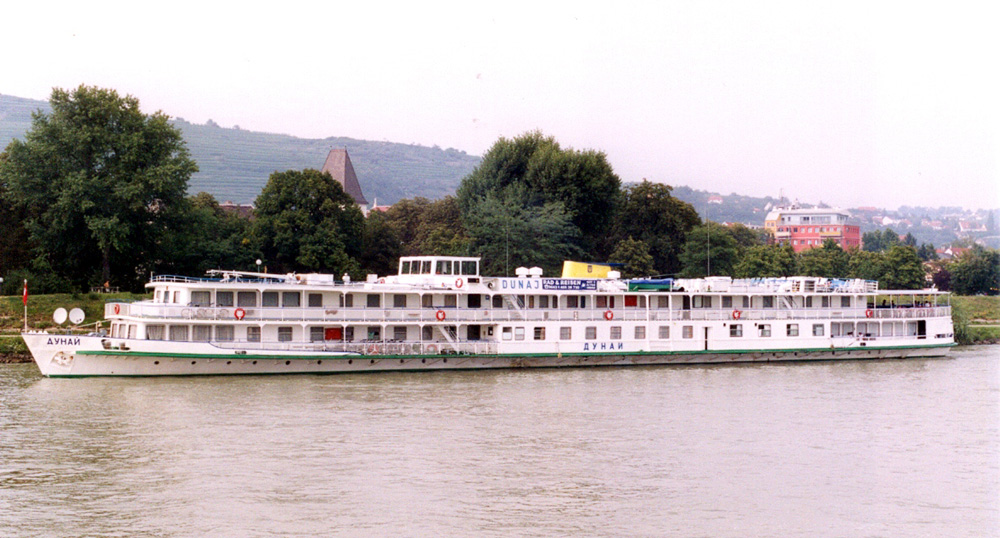
- River cruise ship Dunay in Krems in 2002

Class overview
- Builders: Österreichische Schiffswerften AG, Korneuburg, Austria
- Built: 1960
- Planned: 2
- Building: 2
- Completed: 2
- Active: 1

General characteristics
- Tonnage: 850 GT
- Displacement: 850 t
- Length: 85.8 m (281 ft)
- Beam: 14.06 m (46.1 ft)
- Draught: 1.55 m (5.1 ft)
- Decks: 2 passenger decks
- Installed power: 2 × Deutz RBV8M 545 1,766 kilowatts (2,368 hp)
- Propulsion: 2
- Speed: 29 km/h (18 mph; 16 kn)
- Capacity: 212 passengers
- Crew: 56

Amur class is a class of Russian river passenger ships. It is named after the first ship in the class, which in her turn was named after the Amur River.

Two-deck cruise ships manufactured by Österreichische Schiffswerften AG at their shipyard in Korneuburg, Austria in 1960. These vessels cruised the Danube regularly, as far west as Vienna, Austria. "Amur" was laid up at Budapest, Hungary and signed "for sale" in late 2011.

== River cruise ships of the Austrian project Q-003 ==
Amur class motorships
No.	Original name	English transliteration
1	Амур	Amur
2	Дунай	Dunay

== Overview ==
Amur class
Month and year of build	Hull No	Image	Name	Operator	Port of Registry	Flag	Status
June 1960	596		Amur	Ukr-Dunayskoye-Parohodstvo	Izmail → Budapest	→ →	out of service June 2012, scrapped in Komárno
April 1960	595		Dunay	Ukr-Dunayskoye-Parohodstvo	Izmail	→	No. 2-600852 (RSU)

== See also ==
- List of river cruise ships
- Valerian Kuybyshev-class motorship
- Rossiya-class motorship (1952)
- Rossiya-class motorship (1973)
- Anton Chekhov-class motorship
- Vladimir Ilyich-class motorship
- Rodina-class motorship
- Baykal-class motorship
- Sergey Yesenin-class motorship
- Oktyabrskaya Revolyutsiya-class motorship
- Yerofey Khabarov-class motorship
- Dunay-class motorship
- Volga-class motorship
- Dmitriy Furmanov-class motorship
