= Volga-class motorship =

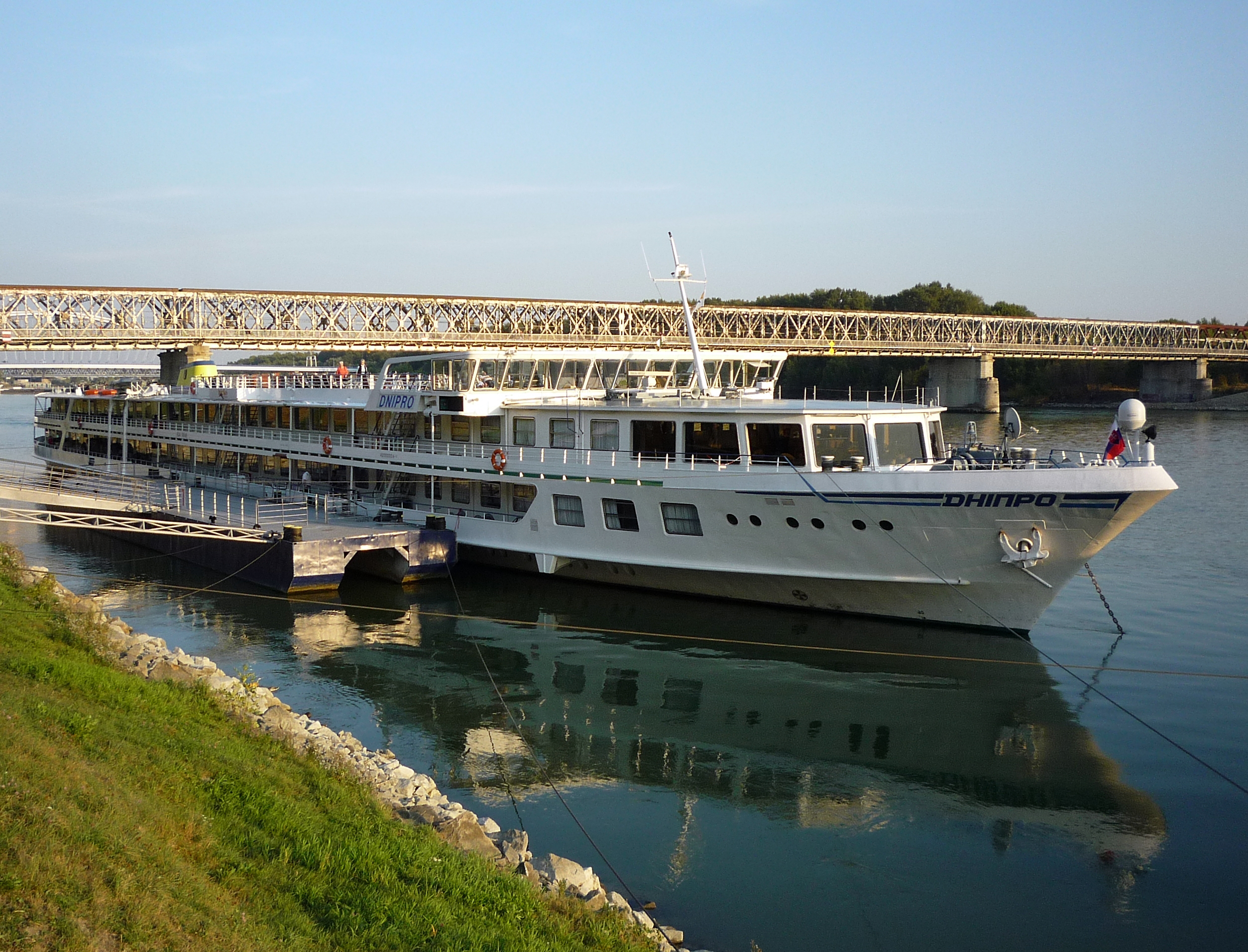
- River cruise ship Dnipro at pier in Bratislava in 2011

Class overview
- Builders: Österreichische Schiffswerften AG, Korneuburg, Austria
- Built: 1970
- In service: 1970
- Planned: 2
- Building: 2
- Completed: 2
- Active: 2

General characteristics
- Tonnage: 2,125 GT
- Length: 105.9 m (347 ft)
- Beam: 16.1 m (53 ft)
- Draught: 1.65 m (5.4 ft)
- Decks: 3 passenger decks
- Installed power: 2 × MWM TbD 440-8 1,324 kilowatts (1,776 hp)
- Propulsion: 2
- Speed: 26.2 km/h (16.3 mph; 14.1 kn)
- Capacity: 212 passengers
- Crew: 77

The Volga class is a class of Russian river passenger ships. It is named after the first ship in the class Volga, which in her turn was named after Volga River.

Three deck cruise ships built by Österreichische Schiffswerften AG at their shipyard in Korneuburg, Austria in 1970.

== River cruise ships of the Austrian project Q-031 ==
Volga-class motorships
No.	Original name	English transliteration
1	Волга	Volga
2	Днепр (Дніпро)	Dnepr (Dnipro)

== Overview ==
Volga class
Month and year of build	Hull No	Image	Name	Owner	Port of Registry	Flag	Status
1970	K687		Volga	Ukrainian Danube Shipping Company	Izmail	→	RSU 2-601784; ENI 42000003
1970	K688		Dnipro	Ukrainian Danube Shipping Company	Izmail	→	RSU 2-601783; ENI 42000004

== See also ==
- List of river cruise ships
- Valerian Kuybyshev-class motorship
- Rossiya-class motorship (1952)
- Rossiya-class motorship (1973)
- Anton Chekhov-class motorship
- Vladimir Ilyich-class motorship
- Rodina-class motorship
- Baykal-class motorship
- Sergey Yesenin-class motorship
- Oktyabrskaya Revolyutsiya-class motorship
- Yerofey Khabarov-class motorship
- Dunay-class motorship
- Amur-class motorship
- Dmitriy Furmanov-class motorship
