= List of river cruise ships =

This is a list of river cruise ships, both those in service and those that have since ceased to operate. As some river cruise ships have operated under multiple names, all names will be listed in the "Notes" section.

Name	Image	Year of build	Length	Capacity	Operator	Class	Port of registry	Flag	Register No.	Notes
A-Rosa Alva		2019	79.80 m (262 ft)	126	A-ROSA Flussschiff			(Portugal)	IMO 9902158	
A-Rosa Aqua		2009	135.0 m (443 ft)	202	A-ROSA Flussschiff		Rostock	(Germany)	IMO 9524176	ENI 04807500
A-Rosa Bella		2002	124.5 m (408 ft)	242	A-ROSA Flussschiff		Rostock	(Germany)	IMO 9271482	ENI 04801170
A-Rosa Brava		2011	135.0 m (443 ft)	202	A-ROSA Flussschiff		Rostock	(Germany)	ENI 04809910	
A-Rosa Donna		2002	124.5 m (408 ft)	242	A-ROSA Flussschiff		Rostock	(Germany)	IMO 9271470	ENI 04801130
A-Rosa Flora		2014	135.0 m (443 ft)	183	A-ROSA Flussschiff		Rostock	(Germany)	ENI 04810970	
A-Rosa Luna		2004	125.8 m (413 ft)	174	A-ROSA Flussschiff		Rostock	(Germany)	ENI 04803520	
A-Rosa Mia		2003	124.0 m (407 ft)	242	A-ROSA Flussschiff		Rostock	(Germany)	IMO 8979283	ENI 04801870
A-Rosa Riva		2004	124.5 m (408 ft)	242	A-ROSA Flussschiff		Rostock	(Germany)	IMO 8979295	ENI 04802780
A-Rosa Silva		2012	135.0 m (443 ft)	186	A-ROSA Flussschiff		Rostock	(Germany)	ENI 04810230	
A-Rosa Stella		2005	125.8 m (413 ft)	174	A-ROSA Flussschiff		Rostock	(Germany)	ENI 04803530	
A-Rosa Viva		2010	135.0 m (443 ft)	202	A-ROSA Flussschiff		Rostock	(Germany)	IMO 9524188	ENI 04808020
A. I. Gertsen	Image	1959	95.8 m (314 ft)		AkademFlot	Rodina / 588	Nizhny Novgorod	(Soviet Union) → (Russia)	RRR 082650	
A. Matrosov		1954	95.8 m (314 ft)	150	PassazhirRechTrans	Rodina / 588	Krasnoyarsk	(Soviet Union) → (Russia)	RRR 142502	
A. S. Popov		1961	95.8 m (314 ft)	245	Oka	Rodina / 588	Nizhny Novgorod	(Soviet Union) → (Russia)	RRR 145002	
Afanasiy Nikitin		1959	96.27 m (316 ft)	294		Oktyabrskaya Revolyutsiya / 26-37	Nizhny Novgorod	(Soviet Union) → (Russia)	RRR 140111	originally, the Mir
Alegria		1985	90.0 m (295 ft)	136	Rein Ouwinga		Rotterdam	(Netherlands)	ENI 02205451	originally, the De Zonneblom, formerly Harbourlight
Aleksandr Benua		1960	96.27 m (316 ft)	312	Infoflot	Oktyabrskaya Revolyutsiya / 26-37	Moscow	(Soviet Union) → (Russia)	RRR 140132	originally, the Yakov Sverdlov
Aleksandr Blok	Image	1959	77.91 m (256 ft)			Dunay / 305	Moscow	(Soviet Union) → (Russia)	RRR 142911	originally, the Dunay
Aleksandr Fadeyev		1961	95.8 m (314 ft)		Kama Shipping	Rodina / 588	Perm	(Soviet Union) → (Russia)	RRR 145008	
Aleksandr Grin		1984	90.4 m (297 ft)	180	Mosturflot	Sergey Yesenin / Q-065/PV08	Moscow	(Soviet Union) → (Russia)	RRR 235702	originally, the Aleksandr Blok
Aleksandr Nevskiy		1957	95.8 m (314 ft)	232	Kruiz	Rodina / 588	Volgograd	(Soviet Union) → (Russia)	RRR 142578	
Aleksandr Pushkin		1974	110.1 m (361 ft)	200	Vodohod	Maksim Gorkiy / Q-040	Nizhny Novgorod	(Soviet Union) → (Russia)	RRR 019377	
Aleksandr Radishchev		1982	125.0 m (410 ft)	216	Vodohod	Vladimir Ilyich / 301	Nizhny Novgorod	(Soviet Union) → (Russia)	IMO 8225682	RRR 160216
Aleksandr Sveshnikov		1961	77.91 m (256 ft)			Dunay / 305	Nizhny Novgorod	(Soviet Union) → (Russia)	RRR 142948	originally, the Volkhov
Aleksandr Suvorov		1981	135.75 m (445 ft)	400	Vodohod	Valerian Kuybyshev / 92-016	Nizhny Novgorod	(Soviet Union) → (Russia)	RRR 140661	disaster on 5 June 1983, collision with Ulyanovsk railway bridge on the Volga river
Aleksandra		1991	129.1 m (424 ft)	258		Dmitriy Furmanov/302MK	Rostov-on-Don	(Soviet Union) → (Ukraine) → (Kazakhstan) → (Russia)	IMO 8925036	originally, the Taras Shevchenko, formerly T. G. Shevchenko
Aleksey Tolstoy		1954	95.8 m (314 ft)	179		Rodina / 588	Samara	(Soviet Union) → (Russia)	RRR 142503	
Alemannia		1971	110.0 m (361 ft)	184	Nicko Tours		Basel		ENI 07001703	
Alesha Popovich		1957	95.8 m (314 ft)	140	Berkut	Rodina / 588	Moscow	(Soviet Union) → (Russia)	RRR 082169	
Alina		2011	135.0 m (443 ft)	220	Scylla		Basel		ENI 07001934	
Allegro	Image	1991	105.8 m (347 ft)	150	Calanda Riverline Cruises		Enkhuizen	(France) → (Netherlands)	ENI 02326758	originally, the Liberte, formerly Abel Tasman
Allure	Image	1908	42.26 m (139 ft)	24	Martien van de Velde		Amsterdam	(Netherlands)	ENI 02202474	originally, the Hoop op Zegen, formerly Adelaar; coaster cargo ship converted to cruise ship in 1998
Altay	Image	1958	95.8 m (314 ft)	339		Rodina / 588	Leningrad	(Soviet Union)	unknown	sold to Baltics, out of service 199*, scrapped
AmaBella		2010	135.0 m (443 ft)	162	AmaWaterways		Basel		ENI 02332082	
AmaCello		2008	110.0 m (361 ft)	150	AmaWaterways		Basel		ENI 02329809	
AmaCerto		2012	135.0 m (443 ft)	164	AmaWaterways		Basel		ENI 07001949	
AmaDagio		2006	110.0 m (361 ft)	150	Australian Pacific Touring		Basel		ENI 07001828	
AmaDante		2008	110.0 m (361 ft)	150	AmaWaterways		Basel		ENI 02329183	
Amadeus		1997	110.0 m (361 ft)	146	Lueftner Cruises		Passau	(Germany)	ENI 08848003	
Amadeus Queen		2018	135.00 m (445 ft)	160	Lueftner Cruises		Passau	(Germany)	ENI 02337456	
Amadeus Brilliant		2011	114.0 m (374 ft)	150	Lueftner Cruises		Passau	(Germany)	ENI 04809350	
Amadeus Classic		2001	110.0 m (361 ft)	146	Lueftner Cruises		Passau	(Germany)	ENI 04801620	
Amadeus Diamond		2008	114.0 m (374 ft)	150	Lueftner Cruises		Passau	(Germany)	ENI 04807380	
Amadeus Elegant		2010	114.0 m (374 ft)	150	Danubia Kreuzfahrten		Passau	(Germany)	ENI 04808350	
Brabant		2006	110.0 m (361 ft)	148	Lueftner Cruises		Passau	(Germany)	ENI 04804710	
Amadeus Rhapsody		1998	110.0 m (361 ft)	142	Lueftner Cruises		Passau	(Germany)	ENI 08848002	
Amadeus Royal		2005	110.0 m (361 ft)	150	Lueftner Cruises		Passau	(Germany)	ENI 04803670	
Amadeus Silver		2013	135.0 m (443 ft)	180	Lueftner Cruises		Passau	(Germany)	ENI 02335475	
Amadeus Silver II		2015	135.0 m (443 ft)	168	Lüftner Cruises		Passau	(Germany)	ENI 02336369	
Amadeus Symphony		2003	110.0 m (361 ft)	146	Danubia Kreuzfahrten		Passau	(Germany)	ENI 04802330	
AmaDolce		2009	110.0 m (361 ft)	148	AmaWaterways		Basel		ENI 02331267	
AmaLegro		2007	110.0 m (361 ft)	150	Sanssouci		Hamburg	(Germany)	ENI 07001837	
AmaLyra		2009	110.0 m (361 ft)	148	Amalyra		Basel		ENI 02331266	
AmaMagna		2018	135.0 m (443 ft)	194	AmaWaterways		Basel		ENI 07002100	Twice as wide as traditional river cruise
AmaPrima		2013	135.0 m (443 ft)	164	AmaWaterways		Basel		ENI 07001958	
AmaReina		2014	135.0 m (443 ft)	162	AmaWaterways		Basel		ENI 02335818	
AmaSerena		2015	135.0 m (443 ft)	164	AmaWaterways		Basel		ENI 07002014	
AmaSonata		2014	135.0 m (443 ft)	164	AmaWaterways		Basel		ENI 07001981	
AmaVenita		2014	135.0 m (443 ft)	162	AmaWaterways		Basel	Switzerland	ENI 07002005	built as AmaVista
AmaVerde		2011	135.0 m (443 ft)	162	Australian Pacific Touring		Basel		ENI 07001948	
AmaVida	Image	2013	79.0 m (259 ft)	108	AmaWaterways		unknown	(Portugal)	unknown	
Amelia		2012	135.0 m (443 ft)	220	Scylla		Basel		ENI 02205451	
American Empress		2003	116.0 m (381 ft)	223	American Queen Steamboat Co.			(United States)	IMO 9263538	originally, Empress of the North
American Queen		1995	127.4 m (418 ft)	436	American Queen Steamboat Co.			(United States)	IMO 9084542	
American Spirit		2005	60.8 m (199 ft)	100	American Cruise Lines		Wilmington	(United States)	IMO 9283124	
American Star	Image	2007	57.2 m (188 ft)	100	American Cruise Lines		Dover	(United States)	IMO 9427615	
Amsterdam		1948	77.55 m (254 ft)	100	Wenniger River Cruises		Workum	→ (Germany) → (Netherlands)	ENI 02325953	originally, the tugboat Schwyz, formerly Heinrich Liesen I, Rex-Rheni, Tremella II
Amur		1960	85.8 m (281 ft)	212		Amur / Q-003	Budapest	(Soviet Union) → (Ukraine) → (Hungary)	unknown	scrapped in 2012
Amwaj Livingstone		2014	73.00 m (240 ft)	124				(Egypt)	unknown	
Andante		1959	74.4 m (244 ft)	90	Calanda Riverline Cruises		Enkhuizen	(Netherlands)	ENI 02325292	originally, the tugboat Damco 21, formerly Alexander von Engelberg, Scylla, Kellermann
Andrey Rublyov		1981	125.0 m (410 ft)	300	MosTurFlot	Vladimir Ilyich / 301	Moscow	(Soviet Union) → (Ukraine) → (Russia)	IMO 8131532	RRR 233821, originally, the Nikolay Dobrolyubov
Anesha		2014	135.0 m (443 ft)	180	Scylla		Basel		ENI 07002024	
Anichka		1959	95.8 m (314 ft)			Rodina / 588	Sligo	(Soviet Union) → (Russia) → (Republic of Ireland)	unknown	originally, the T. G. Shevtshenko, formerly Svyatoy Petr; sank near Sligo, Ireland; out of service since 2003
Anna Akhmatova		1959	77.91 m (256 ft)	311		Dunay / 305	Moscow	(Soviet Union) → (Russia)	RRR 142913	originally, the Dnepr, formerly Mikhail Nazarov, Don, Vladimir Monomakh
Anton Chekhov		1978	115.6 m (379 ft)	220	Orthodox Cruise Company	Anton Chekhov / Q-056	Rostov-on-Don	(Soviet Union) → (Russia)	RRR 034941	
Antonio Bellucci		2012	110.0 m (361 ft)	141	Medi Ship AG		Basel		ENI 02334599	
Arabella		1955	95.8 m (314 ft)	150	Admiral	Rodina / 588	Kazan	(Soviet Union) → (Russia)	RRR 142504	originally, the L. Dovator, decommissioned in 2014, scrapped
Ariana		2012	110.0 m (361 ft)	162	Dunav Tours		Ruse	(Bulgaria)	ENI 02334084	
Arlene		2012	91.20 m (299 ft)	109	HTL Cruises		Arnhem	(Netherlands)	ENI 02326752	
Armeniya	Image	1953	80.22 m (263 ft)	233		Rossiya / 785	Perm	(Soviet Union)	unknown	in Chaykovskiy slip in Perm
Aurelia		2007	110.0 m (361 ft)	159	Scylla		Basel		ENI 07001841	
Avalon Affinity		2009	110.0 m (361 ft)	138	Avalon Waterways		Hamburg	(Germany)	ENI 02330846	
Avalon Artistry II		2013	110.0 m (361 ft)	128	Avalon Waterways		Hamburg	(Germany)	ENI 02334737	
Avalon Creativity		2009	110.0 m (361 ft)	138	Avalon Waterways		Hamburg	(Germany)	ENI 02331194	
Avalon Expression		2013	135.0 m (443 ft)	168	Avalon Waterways		Hamburg	(Germany)	ENI 02334920	
Avalon Felicity		2010	110.0 m (361 ft)	138	Avalon Waterways		Hamburg	(Germany)	ENI 02332007	
Avalon Impression		2014	135.0 m (443 ft)	166	Avalon Waterways		Basel		ENI 02335436	
Avalon Luminary		2010	110.0 m (361 ft)	138	Avalon Waterways		Hamburg	(Germany)	ENI 02332637	
Avalon Panorama		2011	135.0 m (443 ft)	170	Avalon Waterways		Basel		ENI 02333460	
Avalon Poetry II		2014	110.0 m (361 ft)	128	Avalon Waterways		Basel		ENI 02335229	
Avalon Tranquility II		2015	110.0 m (361 ft)	130	Avalon Waterways		Basel		ENI 02335906	
Avalon Visionary		2012	110.0 m (361 ft)	138	Avalon Waterways		Hamburg	(Germany)	ENI 02334430	
Avalon Vista	Image	2012	135.0 m (443 ft)	170	Avalon Waterways		Basel		ENI 02333954	
Avicena	Image	1978	125.0 m (410 ft)		Andrea Navigation	Vladimir Ilyich / 301	Kingstown	(Soviet Union) → (Saint Vincent and the Grenadines)	IMO 8884749	originally, the 60 let Oktyabrya, formerly Floks, Eye Clinic, scrapped in Alang, 16 May 2006
Avrora		1960	95.8 m (314 ft)			Rodina / 588	Saint Petersburg	(Soviet Union) → (Russia)	unknown	
Azerbaydzhan	Image	1953	80.22 m (263 ft)	233		Rossiya / 785	Sevastopol	(Soviet Union) → (Ukraine)	unknown	hotelship near Chernobyl Nuclear Power Plant after Chernobyl disaster; watersport center in Sevastopol
Azolla		1938	76.50 m (251 ft)	90	Vranken River Line		Maasbracht	(Netherlands)	ENI 02311625	built as tugboat Adolf Linden 1, formerly Ernst Tengelmann, Pionier Andreas, rebuilt to river cruise ship in 1966
Bagration		1958	95.8 m (314 ft)	339		Rodina / 588	Nizhny Novgorod	(Soviet Union) → (Russia)	unknown	out of service 1999, scrapped
Bashkortostan		1962	77.91 m (256 ft)	311		Dunay / 305	Ufa	(Soviet Union) → (Russia)	RRR 142961	originally, the Daugava, formerly Aleksey Kiselev
Beethoven		2004	110.0 m (361 ft)	180	CroisiEurope		Strasbourg	(France)	ENI 01823122	
Bellejour		2004	127.0 m (417 ft)	180	KD Cruise Services		Valletta		ENI 09948006	originally, the Johann Strauss (ENI 01823029)
Bellevue		2006	135.0 m (443 ft)	198	Transocean	TwinCruiser	Valletta		ENI 09948013	
Bellisima		2004	110.0 m (361 ft)	134	Nicko-Tours		Basel	(Netherlands) →	ENI 02324885	originally, the Royal Lindavia, since 2012 in operation on the Po River
Bellriva		1971	104.64 m (343 ft)	186	1AVista Reisen		Heesch	(Netherlands)	ENI 07001702	originally, the Holland Emerald, formerly Italia, Bonaventura Emerald, Rhine Emerald
Belorussiya	Image	1953	80.22 m (263 ft)	233		Rossiya / 785	Kazan	(Soviet Union)	unknown	hotelship near Chernobyl Nuclear Power Plant after Chernobyl disaster, scrapped in 1989
Belvedere	Image	2005	126.6 m (415 ft)	176	KD Cruise Services		Valletta		ENI 09948010	originally, the Avalon Poetry
Bizet		2002	110.0 m (361 ft)	120	Bizet Schiffahrt		Basel	(Netherlands) →	ENI 07001815	
Bolero		2003	126.7 m (416 ft)	180	KD Cruise Servises		Valletta		ENI 09948004	
Borodino		1961	77.91 m (256 ft)	311		Dunay / 305	Nizhny Novgorod	(Soviet Union) → (Russia)	RRR 142940	originally, the Berezina, formerly Motovilikhinskiy Rabochiy
Botticelli		2004	110.0 m (361 ft)	160	CroisiEurope		Strasbourg	(France)	ENI 01823123	
Brilliant		1948	63.49 m (208 ft)	82	BTR International River Cruises		Loenen	(Netherlands)	ENI 02312870	originally, the tugboat Jean Millot, rebuilt into a river cruise ship 1976
Britannia		1969	110.0 m (361 ft)	184	Nicko Tours		Basel		ENI 07001701	damaged on the IJssel River on June 21, 2014
Bulgariya		1955	80.22 m (263 ft)	180	Briz (sub), AgroRechTur	Rossiya / 785	Perm	(Soviet Union) → (Russia)	RRR 140031	† sunk 10 July 2011 on the Volga river, scrapped
Calypso		1978	74.75 m (245 ft)	95	Phoenix Reisen		Maassluis	(Netherlands)	ENI 02321970	
Camargue		1995	105.0 m (344 ft)	148	CroisiEurope		Tain-l'Hermitage	(France)	unknown	
Casanova		2003	103.5 m (340 ft)	96	Nicko Tours		Basel	(Germany) →	ENI 04800110	formerly for Peter Deilmann Cruises, Neustadt in Holstein
Cézanne		1993	118.75 m (390 ft)	100	Nicko Tours		Basel	(Germany) →	IMO 9037927	ENI 05117120
Chaykovskiy	Image	1956	80.22 m (263 ft)	233		Rossiya / 785	Volgograd	(Soviet Union)	unknown	hotelship near Chernobyl Nuclear Power Plant after Chernobyl disaster, out of service 2005
Clara Schumann		1991	94.8 m (311 ft)	112	Viking Flussreisen		Oberwesel	(Germany)	ENI 05113920	
Classica		2000	111.2 m (365 ft)	160	Nicko Tours		Valletta		ENI 09948009	originally, the Viking Star
Club Vision		1984	48.0 m (157 ft)	39	Travcotels			(Egypt)	unknown	
Crystal Bach		2017	135 m (443 ft)	106	Crystal River Cruises	Rhine	Valletta	(Malta)	ENI 04812680	
Crystal Mahler		2017	135 m (443 ft)	106	Crystal River Cruises	Rhine	Valletta	(Malta)	ENI 04812700	
Crystal Mozart		1987	120.6 m (396 ft)	207	Crystal River Cruises		Valletta	(Germany) → → (Malta)	ENI 04805980	originally, the Mozart (Peter Deilmann Cruises then DETOUR Mozart with Premicon-AG; DERTOUR
Cyrano de Bergerac		2013	110.0 m (361 ft)	176	CroisiEurope		Strasbourg	(France)	ENI 01831891	
Da Vinci		1995	104.5 m (343 ft)	114	Medi Ship AG		Basel		ENI 07001839	
Danubia		1980	98.98 m (325 ft)	154	Danubia Kreuzfahrten		Passau	(Netherlands) → (Germany) → (Romania) → (Germany)	ENI 46000113	originally, the William F. Feenstra Sr., formerly Filia Rheni, Franz Liszt
DCS Amethyst		2004	127.3 m (418 ft)	178	KD Cruise Servises		Valletta		ENI 09948007	originally, the Artistry
De Zonnebloem		2005	115.0 m (377 ft)	135	De Zonnebloem		Breda	(Netherlands)	ENI 02327391	
Debusi	Image	2000	110.0 m (361 ft)	120			Aktau	(Netherlands) → (Kazakhstan)	ENI 07001738	originally, the Debussy, hotelship on the Caspian Sea
Delta Queen		1927	86.9 m (285 ft)	174	Majestic America Line			(United States)	IMO 8643327	originally, the Delta Queen, formerly Delta Queen YHF 7, Delta Queen YFB 56; hotelship
Demyan Bednyy		1985	90.4 m (297 ft)	160	LenaTurFlot	Sergey Yesenin / Q-065	Yakutsk	(Soviet Union) → (Russia)	RRR 216304	
Denis Davydov	Image	1959	95.8 m (314 ft)			Rodina / 588	Perm	(Soviet Union) → (Russia)	unknown	
Der kleine Prinz		1990	93.3 m (306 ft)	90	Quality Tours ApS		Bremen	(Germany)	ENI 04803150	
Diana		1931	31.66 m (104 ft)		Strömma Kanalbolaget		Gothenburg	(Sweden)	IMO 8634120	
Diana		1964	78.63 m (258 ft)		Trans River Line		Rotterdam	(Netherlands)	ENI 02325128	
Dmitriy Pozharskiy		1957	95.8 m (314 ft)	140	Zesar Travel	Rodina / 588	Nizhny Novgorod	(Soviet Union) → (Russia)	RRR 142582	
Dnipro		1970	105.9 m (347 ft)	140	UDP	Volga / Q-031	Izmail	(Soviet Union) → (Ukraine)	ENI 42000004	originally, the Dnepr
Dong Fang Zhi Xing	Image	1994	77 m (253 ft)	543				(China)		
Douro Cruiser		2005	78.11 m (256 ft)	130	Douroazul		Portimão	(Portugal)	IMO 9329344	
Douro Queen		2005	78.11 m (256 ft)	130	Douroazul		Portimão	(Portugal)	IMO 9329356	
Dunay		1960	85.8 m (281 ft)	212		Amur / Q-003	Izmail	(Soviet Union) → (Ukraine)	unknown	scrapped in 2017
Dve Stolitsy		1961	95.8 m (314 ft)	140	Voyazh	Rodina / 588	Rostov-on-Don	(Soviet Union) → (Russia)	RRR 145004	originally, the K. E. Tsiolkovskiy, Anatoliy Papanov
Elegant Lady		2003	110.0 m (361 ft)	128	Dunav Tours		Ruse	(Bulgaria)	ENI 08923003	
Esmeralda		1979	90.0 m (295 ft)	134	Trans River Line		Rotterdam	(Netherlands)	ENI 02315764	
Excellence Coral	Image	1998	82.0 m (269 ft)	90	Reisebüro Mittelthurgau		Basel		ENI 07001711	originally, the Swiss Coral
Excellence Queen		2011	110.0 m (361 ft)	142	Swiss Excellence River Cruise		Basel		ENI 02333632	
Excellence Rhone		2006	110.0 m (361 ft)	142	Swiss Excellence River Cruise		Basel		ENI 07001833	formerly Excellence
Excellence Royal		2010	110.0 m (361 ft)	144	Swiss Excellence River Cruise		Basel		ENI 02332815	
F. Engels	Image	1956	95.8 m (314 ft)	150		Rodina / 588	Kaliningrad	(Soviet Union) → (Russia)	unknown	† sank on 6. November 2003 in the Baltic Sea on the way from Saint Petersburg to Kaliningrad, 20 nautical miles off Kaliningrad
F. I. Panfyorov		1961	95.8 m (314 ft)	160	Voyazh	Rodina / 588	Perm	(Soviet Union) → (Russia)	RRR 145006	
F. Zholio-Kyuri	Image	1961	95.8 m (314 ft)	339	Kama Shipping	Rodina / 588	Perm	(Soviet Union) → (Russia)	RRR 145005	burnt on 3. Oktober 2011, damaged
Fedor Abramov		1962	77.91 m (256 ft)	130		Dunay / 305	Moscow	(Soviet Union) → (Russia)	RRR 142963	originally, the Neman
Fedor Dostoyevskiy		1983	125.0 m (410 ft)	300	Kama Two Shipping Company	Vladimir Ilyich / 301	Perm	(Soviet Union) → (Russia)	IMO 8212910	RRR 160218
Fedor Gladkov	Image	1961	95.8 m (314 ft)	310	Viktoriya	Rodina / 588	Perm	(Soviet Union) → (Russia)	RRR 145007	
Forever Lucky		1991	129.1 m (424 ft)	258		Dmitriy Furmanov/302MK		(China) → (Philippines)	IMO 8529179	originally, the Konstantin Stanyukovich, formerly Xian Ni
Fedor Shalyapin		1977	135.75 m (445 ft)	400	Vodohod	Valerian Kuybyshev / 92-016	Nizhny Novgorod	(Soviet Union) → (Russia)	RRR 140656	originally, the Kliment Voroshilov
Feliks Dzerzhinskiy		1978	135.75 m (445 ft)	400	Vodohod	Valerian Kuybyshev / 92-016	Nizhny Novgorod	(Soviet Union) → (Russia)	RRR 140657	
Ferris Flotel		1979	125.0 m (410 ft)			Vladimir Ilyich / 301	Busan	(Soviet Union) → (Russia) → (South Korea)	IMO 8031366	originally, the 30 let GDR, formerly Vladimir Arsenyev; sank 2003 at quay in Busan, scrapped in 2005
Fidelio		1995	110.0 m (361 ft)	148	Nicko Tours		Basel	(Netherlands)	ENI 04801210	
Filia Rheni		1999	110.0 m (361 ft)	148	Rijfers River Cruises		Arnhem	(Germany) → (Netherlands)	ENI 04608050	originally, the Blue Danube III , formerly Viking Danube
Flamenco		2005	135.0 m (443 ft)	200	KD Cruise Servises	TwinCruiser	Valletta		ENI 09948011	
Florentina	Image	1980	80.0 m (262 ft)	90	Nicko Tours		Prague	(Germany) → (Czech Republic)	ENI 32108292	originally, the Kieler Sprotte
France		2003	110.0 m (361 ft)	160	CroisiEurope		Strasbourg	(France)	ENI 01823029	
Frederic Chopin		2002	82.93 m (272 ft)	79	Nicko Tours		Basel	(Germany) →	IMO 9272515	formerly for Peter Deilmann Cruises, Neustadt in Holstein; ENI 04801240
G. V. Plekhanov		1959	95.8 m (314 ft)			Rodina / 588	Nizhny Novgorod	(Soviet Union) → (Russia)	RRR 082519	
General I. D. Chernyakhovskiy	Image	1960	95.8 m (314 ft)		Kama SK	Rodina / 588	Perm	(Soviet Union) → (Russia)	RRR 041021	
General Lavrinenkov		1990	129.1 m (424 ft)	212	Orthodox Cruise Company	Dmitriy Furmanov/302	Rostov-on-Don	(Soviet Union) → (Ukraine) → (Russia)	IMO 8963595	RRR 222708
General Vatutin		1986	129.1 m (424 ft)	280	Chervona Ruta	Dmitriy Furmanov/302	Belize City	(Soviet Union) → (Ukraine) → (Belize)	IMO 8963595	originally, the General Vatutin (in Russian); RSU 2-010193
Georgiy Chicherin		1988	129.1 m (424 ft)	294	Vodohod	Dmitriy Furmanov / 302	Nizhny Novgorod	(Soviet Union) → (Russia)	IMO 8822507	RRR 222705
Georgiy Zhukov		1983	135.75 m (445 ft)	400	Vodohod	Valerian Kuybyshev / 92-016	Nizhny Novgorod	(Soviet Union) → (Russia)	RRR 140663	
Gerard Schmitter		2012	110.0 m (361 ft)	176	CroisiEurope		Strasbourg	(France)	ENI 01831335	
Gleb Krzhizhanovskiy		1990	129.1 m (424 ft)	310		Dmitriy Furmanov/302M	Moscow	(Soviet Union) → (Russia)	RRR 222710	hotelship on the Caspian Sea
Gospodin Velikiy Novgorod		1954	65.2 m (214 ft)			Baykal / 646	Veliky Novgorod	(Soviet Union) → (Russia)	RRR 142515	originally, the Sevan, formerly Geroy Y. Gagarin
Gruziya	Image	1953	80.22 m (263 ft)	233		Rossiya / 785	Kazan	(Soviet Union)	unknown	hotelship near Chernobyl Nuclear Power Plant after Chernobyl disaster, scrapped 1989
Heidelberg		2004	109.79 m (360 ft)	160	Nicko Tours		Basel	(Germany) →	ENI 04802890	
Heinrich Heine		1991	106.38 m (349 ft)	110	WT Cruises		Russe	(Bulgaria)	ENI 08948008	originally, the Ursula III
Hispania		1961	93.2 m (306 ft)	144	KD Cruise Servises		Oberwesel	(Germany)	ENI 04804450	originally, the Helvetia
Holland		1924	37.73 m (124 ft)		J. H. Sieben		Venlol	(Netherlands)	ENI 02301864	originally, the Verandering, formerly Germa, rebuilt into a river cruise ship in 1989
Horizon		1956	80.0 m (262 ft)	99	Vof. de Bruin-Edelijn		Rotterdam	(Netherlands)	ENI 02316938	originally, the tugboat Triton, formerly Victoria Cruziana, rebuilt into a river cruise ship in 1994, Victoria Amazonica
I. A. Krylov		1956	95.8 m (314 ft)	263		Rodina / 588	Moscow	(Soviet Union) → (Russia)	RRR 142509	
I. S. Turgenev	Image	1959	95.8 m (314 ft)			Rodina / 588	Nizhny Novgorod	(Soviet Union) → (Russia)	RRR 083028	
Ilya Muromets		1958	95.8 m (314 ft)	140	Zesar Travel	Rodina / 588	Moscow	(Soviet Union) → (Russia)	RRR 082168	
Ilya Repin		1975	110.1 m (361 ft)	220	Mosturflot	Maksim Gorkiy / Q-040A	Moscow	(Soviet Union) → (Russia)	RRR 019379	
Ilyich	Image	1956	95.8 m (314 ft)	172		Rodina / 588	Nizhny Novgorod	(Soviet Union) → (Russia)	RRR 142577	
Inspire		2014	135 m (443 ft)	142	Scylla (Tauck Tours)		Basel		ENI 65000006	
Ippolitov-Ivanov	Image	1956	80.22 m (263 ft)	233	PassazhirRechTrans	Rossiya / 785	Krasnoyarsk	(Soviet Union) → (Russia)	RRR 140050	for sale
Ivan Bunin		1985	129.1 m (424 ft)	260	Doninturflot	Dmitriy Furmanov/302	Rostov-on-Don	(Soviet Union) → (Ukraine) → (Russia)	IMO 8521921	RRR 219748
Ivan Kulibin		1960	96.27 m (316 ft)	296	Gama	Oktyabrskaya Revolyutsiya / 26-37	Nizhny Novgorod	(Soviet Union) → (Russia)	RRR 140137	originally, the Andrey Zhdanov
Johann Brahms		1998	81.95 m (269 ft)	80	Swiss River Cruises		Hamburg	(Germany)	ENI 04033510	
Juno		1874	31.45 m (103 ft)	125	Strömma Kanalbolaget		Gothenburg	(Sweden)	IMO 8634132	the oldest cruise steamship in service
K. A. Timiryazev	Image	1959	95.8 m (314 ft)			Rodina / 588	Astrakhan	(Soviet Union) → (Russia)	RRR 091176	
Kapitan Pushkaryov	Image	1960	96.27 m (316 ft)	312	Volga-Flot-Tur	Oktyabrskaya Revolyutsiya / 26-37	Nizhny Novgorod	(Soviet Union) → (Russia)	RRR 140126	originally, the XXI Syezd KPSS; rebuilt into 92-055
Kapitan Rodin	Image	1957	80.22 m (263 ft)	259	PassazhirRechTrans	Rossiya / 785	Krasnoyarsk	(Soviet Union) → (Russia)	RRR 140085	originally, the A. P. Chekhov, formerly Baykal, out of service in 2005
Kareliya	Image	1955	80.22 m (263 ft)	233		Rossiya / 785	Samara	(Soviet Union)	RRR 140027	hotelship near Chernobyl Nuclear Power Plant after Chernobyl disaster, laid up in 2006
Karl Marks		1957	95.8 m (314 ft)	148	Infoflot	Rodina / 588-317	Moscow	(Soviet Union) → (Russia)	RRR 142579	
Karl Marks	Image	1958	80.22 m (263 ft)	233		Rossiya / 785	Kiev	(Soviet Union)	unknown	hotelship near Chernobyl Nuclear Power Plant after Chernobyl disaster, out of service 1989
Katharina von Bora		2000	82.92 m (272 ft)	80	Nicko-Tours		Basel	(Germany) →	ENI 04033510	
Kazakhstan	Image	1954	80.22 m (263 ft)	233		Rossiya / 785	Omsk	(Soviet Union)	unknown	scrapped in the 1990s
Khirurg Razumovskiy		1961	95.8 m (314 ft)	160	Volga	Rodina / 588	Perm	(Soviet Union) → (Russia)	RRR 145009	plus one deck
Klara Tsetkin		1961	96.27 m (316 ft)	312		Oktyabrskaya Revolyutsiya / 26-37	Nizhny Novgorod	(Soviet Union) → (Russia)	unknown	
Knyaz Donskoy		1957	95.8 m (314 ft)	266	Farvater	Rodina / 588	Nizhny Novgorod	(Soviet Union) → (Russia)	RRR 142580	originally, the Dmitriy Donskoy, formerly Kabargin, sank at shipyard in Mari El during repairing on October 4, 2016
Knyaz Vorontsov		1955	80.22 m (263 ft)	259		Rossiya / 785	Moscow	(Soviet Union) → (Russia)	RRR 140028	originally, the Estoniya, formerly Kievskaya Rus
Knyazhna Anastasiya		1989	129.1 m (424 ft)	332	MosTurFlot	Dmitriy Furmanov/302	Moscow	(Soviet Union) → (Russia)	IMO 8922450	originally, the Nikolay Bauman; since 2011 hotelship at Kurmangasy-oilfield; RRR 222707
Knyazhna Viktoriya		1982	125.0 m (410 ft)	360	MosTurFlot	Vladimir Ilyich / 301	Moscow	(Soviet Union) → (Russia)	IMO 8225694	originally, the Aleksandr Griboyedov;RRR 160217
Kolomenskiy Shtandart		1953	80.22 m (263 ft)	233		Rossiya / 785	Moscow	(Soviet Union) → (Russia)	RRR 140018	originally, the Uzbekistan, formerly Tsar Petr, hotelship, cafe at Kolomenskoye in Moscow
Kompozitor Alyabyev	Image	1958	80.22 m (263 ft)	259		Rossiya / 785	Omsk	(Soviet Union) → (Russia)	RRR 140088	
Kompozitor Balakirev	Image	1957	80.22 m (263 ft)	259		Rossiya / 785	Omsk	(Soviet Union) → (Russia)	unknown	
Kompozitor Glazunov	Image	1956	80.22 m (263 ft)	150	Yunona i Avos	Rossiya / 785	Perm	(Soviet Union) → (Russia)	RRR 140052	for sale
Kompozitor Glinka	Image	1956	80.22 m (263 ft)			Rossiya / 785	Perm	(Soviet Union) → (Russia)	RRR 140045	laid up
Kompozitor Kalinnikov	Image	1957	80.22 m (263 ft)	259		Rossiya / 785	Krasnoyarsk	(Soviet Union) → (Russia)	RRR 140055	out of service, floating hotel in Krasnoyarsk
Kompozitor Prokofyev	Image	1957	80.22 m (263 ft)	259		Rossiya / 785	Krasnoyarsk	(Soviet Union) → (Russia)	RRR 140054	out of service, floating wharf in Krasnoyarsk
Kompozitor Skryabin	Image	1957	80.22 m (263 ft)	259		Rossiya / 785	Perm	(Soviet Union) → (Russia)	unknown	laid up
Konstantin Fedin		1980	125.0 m (410 ft)	256	Vodohod	Vladimir Ilyich / 301	Nizhny Novgorod	(Soviet Union) → (Russia)	IMO 8031354	RRR 160210
Konstantin Korotkov		1976	125.0 m (410 ft)	248	Vodohod	Vladimir Ilyich / 301	Nizhny Novgorod	(Soviet Union) → (Russia)	IMO 7515432	originally, the Sovetskaya Ukraina; RRR 160203
Konstantin Simonov		1984	129.1 m (424 ft)	258	Vodohod	Dmitriy Furmanov / 302	Nizhny Novgorod	(Soviet Union) → (Russia)	IMO 8422618	RRR 160223
Korolenko		1954	65.2 m (214 ft)			Baykal / 646	Saint Petersburg	(Soviet Union) → (Russia)	RRR 142517	floating hotel at Vyborg
Kosmonavt Gagarin		1958	95.8 m (314 ft)	201	AkademFlot	Rodina / 588	Nizhny Novgorod	(Soviet Union) → (Russia)	RRR 082170	originally, the Kavkaz
Kozma Minin	Image	1960	95.8 m (314 ft)		Gamma	Rodina / 588	Perm	(Soviet Union) → (Russia)	RRR 027610	
Kremas	Image	1954	80.22 m (263 ft)	233		Rossiya / 785	Navashino	(Soviet Union) → (Russia)	unknown	originally, the Tadzhikistan; out of service in 2007
Kronshtadt		1979	125.0 m (410 ft)	270	Vodohod	Vladimir Ilyich / 301	Saint Petersburg	(Soviet Union) → (Ukraine) → (Russia)	IMO 7706691	originally, the Aleksandr Ulyanov; RRR 160208
Kurmangazy	Image	1999	126.5 m (415 ft)	150		Cézanne GI. A. / 179-RI	Aktau	→ (Russia) → (Belize) → (Kazakhstan)	IMO 8634132	originally, the Cézanne G. I., formerly Kazan, London Night
L'Europe		2006	110.0 m (361 ft)	180	CroisiEurope		Strasbourg	(France)	ENI 01823178	
La Boheme		1995	110.0 m (361 ft)	162	CroisiEurope		Strasbourg	(France)	ENI 01822744	
Lady Anne		1903	67.35 m (221 ft)	100	Nieuwe Rijnvaart Mij		Maasbommel	(Netherlands)	ENI 02007059	originally, the Waalwijk, formerly Avanti, rebuilt into a river cruise ship in 1963
Lenin		1987	129.1 m (424 ft)	318	Vodohod	Dmitriy Furmanov / 302	Nizhny Novgorod	(Soviet Union) → (Russia)	IMO 8707678	RRR 222701
Leonardo da Vinci		2003	105.0 m (344 ft)	144	CroisiEurope		Strasbourg	(France)	ENI 01823119	
Leonid Krasin		1989	129.1 m (424 ft)	332	MosTurFlot	Dmitriy Furmanov / 302	Moscow	(Soviet Union) → (Russia)	IMO 8922448	RRR 222706
Leonid Sobolev		1985	129.1 m (424 ft)	286	Vodohod	Dmitriy Furmanov / 302	Nizhny Novgorod	(Soviet Union) → (Russia)	IMO 8501000	RRR 160224
Lev Tolstoy		1979	115.6 m (379 ft)	220	Vodohod	Anton Chekhov / Q-056	Rostov-on-Don	(Soviet Union) → (Russia)	RRR 034942	
Litva		1955	80.22 m (263 ft)	233		Rossiya / 785	Krasnoyarsk	(Soviet Union) → (Russia)	RRR 140030	Hotel Litva in Krasnoyarsk
Lunnaya Sonata		1988	129.1 m (424 ft)	280		Dmitriy Furmanov / 302	Nizhny Novgorod	(Soviet Union) → (Ukraine) → (Belize) → (Russia)	RSU 2-000191	originally, the Marshal Rybalko, Zirka Dnipra (ukr.), Zirka Dnipra (rus.)
M. V. Lomonosov		1962	77.91 m (256 ft)			Dunay / 305	Moscow	(Soviet Union) → (Russia)	RRR 142964	originally, the Olekma
M. Y. Lermontov	Image	1958	80.22 m (263 ft)	259	PassazhirRechTrans	Rossiya / 785	Krasnoyarsk	(Soviet Union) → (Russia)	RRR 140058	
Maksim Gorkiy		1974	110.1 m (361 ft)	160	Vodohod	Maksim Gorkiy / Q-040	Nizhny Novgorod	(Soviet Union) → (Russia)	RRR 019376	
Maksim Litvinov		1991	129.1 m (424 ft)	260	Orthodox Cruise Company	Dmitriy Furmanov / 302M	Rostov on Don	(Soviet Union) → (Russia)	RRR 225814	
Mamin-Sibiryak		1956	65.2 m (214 ft)			Baykal / 646	Nizhny Novgorod	(Soviet Union) → (Russia)	RRR 142588	
Maribelle		2000	111.24 m (365 ft)	153	Premicon AG		Valletta		ENI 04608430	originally, the Viking Sky, formerly Viking Burgundy, Maribelle, Bijou
Mayak	Image	1955	80.22 m (263 ft)	233		Rossiya / 785	Krasnoyarsk	(Soviet Union) → (Russia)	RRR 140029	originally, the Latviya, formerly Mikhail Godenko, Hotelship in Krasnoyarsk
Mekhanik Kulibin		1955	65.2 m (214 ft)			Baykal / 646	Yakutsk	(Soviet Union) → (Russia)	RRR 142559	
Michelangelo		2000	110.0 m (361 ft)	158	CroisiEurope		Strasbourg	(France)	unknown	
Mikhail Bulgakov		1978	125.0 m (410 ft)	300	MosTurFlot	Vladimir Ilyich / 301	Moscow	(Soviet Union) → (Ukraine) → (Russia)	IMO 7706689	originally, the V. I. Lenin, formerly Maksym Rilskiy (ukr.), Maksim Rylskiy (russ.); RRR 196471
Mikhail Frunze		1980	135.8 m (446 ft)	400	Vodohod	Valerian Kuybyshev / 92-016	Nizhny Novgorod	(Soviet Union) → (Russia)	RRR 140659	
Mikhail Godenko	Image	1956	80.22 m (263 ft)	233		Rossiya / 785	Krasnoyarsk	(Soviet Union) → (Russia)	RRR 140659	originally, the Borodin, out of service 1989
Mikhail Kutuzov		1957	95.8 m (314 ft)	140	Zesar Travel	Rodina / 588	Nizhny Novgorod	(Soviet Union) → (Russia)	RRR 142581	
Mikhail Lermontov		1958	95.8 m (314 ft)	339		Rodina / 588	Nizhny Novgorod	(Soviet Union) → (Russia)	unknown	originally, the Kazbek, out of service 1988, scrapped
Mikhail Sholokhov		1985	129.1 m (424 ft)	260	Doninturflot	Dmitriy Furmanov/302	Nizhny Novgorod	(Soviet Union) → (Russia)	IMO 8521919	RRR 160225
Mikhail Svetlov		1986	90.4 m (297 ft)	160	Alrosa Hotels	Sergey Yesenin / Q-065	Yakutsk	(Soviet Union) → (Russia)	RRR 216305	
Mikhail Tanich		1962	96.27 m (316 ft)	227		Oktyabrskaya Revolyutsiya / 26-37	Nizhny Novgorod	(Soviet Union) → (Russia)	RRR 140204	originally, the N. Shchors
Mistral		1999	110.0 m (361 ft)	158	CroisiEurope		Tain-l'Hermitage	(France)	unknown	
Modigliani		2001	110.0 m (361 ft)	158	CroisiEurope		Strasbourg	(France)	ENI 01823030	
Moldavia		1979	115.66 m (379 ft)	150		Ukraina / Q-053	Izmail	(Soviet Union) → (Ukraine)	ENI 42000002	originally, the Moldaviya
Moldaviya	Image	1953	80.22 m (263 ft)	233		Rossiya / 785	Trabzon	(Soviet Union) → (Turkey)	unknown	† sunk
Mstislav Rostropovich		1981	135.75 m (445 ft)	220	Vodohod	Valerian Kuybyshev / 92-016	Nizhny Novgorod	(Soviet Union) → (Russia)	RRR 140660	originally, the Mikhail Kalinin
Musorgskiy	Image	1956	80.22 m (263 ft)	233		Rossiya / 785	Moscow	(Soviet Union) → (Turkey)	unknown	
My Story		1971	104.64 m (343 ft)	174	Euro Shipping Voyages		Bemmel	(Netherlands) → (Germany) → → (Netherlands)	ENI 07001704	originally, the Holland Pearl, formerly Austria, Bonaventura Pearl, Danube Pearl, Papageno, Aurora, Basilea Danubia
N. A. Nekrasov		1961	96.27 m (316 ft)	312	Infoflot	Oktyabrskaya Revolyutsiya / 26-37	Nizhny Novgorod	(Soviet Union) → (Russia)	RRR 140138	originally, the Sergo Ordzhonikidze
N. V. Gogol		1911	70.7 m (232 ft)	53			Severodvinsk	(Russia) → → (Soviet Union) → (Russia)	RR 4018	steamer, the oldest cabin ship of Russia
N. V. Gogol		1959	95.8 m (314 ft)	339	Gamma	Rodina / 588	Perm	(Soviet Union) → (Russia)	RRR 082649	
Nestroy		2007	124.85 m (410 ft)	230	Swiss Cruises International		Basel		ENI 07001848	
Nikolay Chernyshevskiy		1981	125.0 m (410 ft)	267	Vodohod	Vladimir Ilyich / 301	Nizhny Novgorod	(Soviet Union) → (Russia)	IMO 8131520	RRR 160214
Nikolay Karamzin		1981	125.0 m (410 ft)	300	MosTurFlot	Vladimir Ilyich / 301	Moscow	(Soviet Union) → (Russia)	IMO 8131518	originally, the Sovetskaya Konstitutsiya; RRR 160213
Nizhny Novgorod		1977	125.0 m (410 ft)	246	Vodohod	Vladimir Ilyich / 301	Nizhny Novgorod	(Soviet Union) → (Russia)	IMO 7617785	originally, the Sovetskaya Rossiya; RRR 160205
Normandie		1989	91.2 m (299 ft)	108	Cruiselines Nijmegen		Heesch	(Netherlands)	ENI 02327268	
Ocean Diva Original		2003	85.45 m (280 ft)	1500	Oceandiva		Amsterdam	(Netherlands)	ENI 02322031	built as Dmitriy Furmanov class river cruise ship; rebuilt to the biggest party boat of Europe
Ocharovannyy Strannik		1956	95.8 m (314 ft)	150	Kazan Shipping	Rodina / 588	Nizhny Novgorod	(Soviet Union) → (Russia)	RRR 142507	originally, the Andrey Vyshinskiy, formerly Taras Shevchenko, Sergey Kuchkin, Taras Shevchenko
Ogni Bolshogo Goroda		1977	125.0 m (410 ft)	230	Orthodox Cruise Company	Vladimir Ilyich / 301	Nizhny Novgorod	(Soviet Union) → (Ukraine) → (Russia)	IMO 7608526	originally, the XXV Syezd KPSS, formerly Lesya Ukrai’nka (ukr. Леся Українка), Lesya Ukrainka (rus. Леся Украинка); Petr Chaikovskiy RRR → RKO 196015
Oktyabrskaya Revolyutsiya		1957	96.27 m (316 ft)	294	Oka	Oktyabrskaya Revolyutsiya / 26-37	Nizhny Novgorod	(Soviet Union) → (Russia)	RRR 140090	
Olympia		1984	88.5 m (290 ft)	100	Nicko Tours		Basel	→ (Luxembourg) →	ENI 08046009	originally, the Olympia, formerly Venezia, Thurgau
Omar El Khayam		2008	113.00 m (371 ft)	160	Travco Group		Cairo	(Egypt)	unknown	
Patria		1940	67.18 m (220 ft)	72	Sail & Cruises		Zutphen	(Germany) → (Netherlands)	ENI 02312744	originally, the Hoesch 1, formerly Georg Reitz 1, Ruhr, rebuilt into a river cruise ship in 1969
Petr Alabin		1954	80.22 m (263 ft)	180	Sputnik-Germes	Rossiya / 785	Samara	(Soviet Union) → (Russia)	RRR 140044	originally, the Kirgiziya; hotelship near Chernobyl Nuclear Power Plant after Chernobyl disaster
Printsesa Dnipra		1976	125.0 m (410 ft)	260	Chervona Ruta	Vladimir Ilyich / 301	Kherson	(Soviet Union) → (Ukraine)	RSU 2-000364	originally, the Yevgeniy Vuchetich
Radamis II		2000	72.0 m (236 ft)	150				(Egypt)	unknown	
Rasputin	Image	1952	80.22 m (263 ft)	233		Rossiya / 785	Kimry	(Soviet Union) → (Russia)	RRR 140006	originally, the Rossiya, formerly Rossich; out of service 2011
Regina Rheni		2000	111.24 m (365 ft)	160	Rijfers River Cruises		Amsterdam	(Germany) → (Netherlands)	ENI 02324591	originally, the Viking Rhône, formerly Viking Seine, Spirit of Caledonia
Rembrandt		2003	82.0 m (269 ft)	89	Waterway Rembrandt		Basel		ENI 07001819	
Rembrandt van Rijn		1985	109.75 m (360 ft)	125	Tondia		Zwijndrecht	→ (Netherlands)	ENI 02319818	originally, the Ursula II
Renoir		1999	110.0 m (361 ft)	158	CroisiEurope		Strasbourg	(France)	ENI 01822865	
Rex-Rheni		1979	90.5 m (297 ft)	149	Rijfers River Cruises		Rotterdam	(Germany) → (Netherlands)	ENI 02007993	
Rhein Prinzessin		1998	110.0 m (361 ft)	140	Rhein Prinzessin		Valletta	→	ENI 07001717	originally, the River Symphony
Rhine Princess		1960	83.27 m (273 ft)	120	Princess River Cruise		Basel	(Germany) →	ENI 07000661	originally, the Schwabenland, formerly Ursula, rebuilt into a river cruise ship in 1963
Rhone Princess		2001	110.0 m (361 ft)	120	CroisiEurope		Strasbourg	(France)	ENI 01823026	
Rigoletto		1987	105.0 m (344 ft)	120	Vof. Sijbrands-Faasen		Malden	→ (Netherlands)	ENI 02325887	
Rikhard Zorge		1963	77.91 m (256 ft)	311		Dunay / 305	Nizhny Novgorod	(Soviet Union) → (Russia)	RRR 142985	originally, the Sungari
Rimskiy-Korsakov		1956	80.22 m (263 ft)	180	Irtysch-Reederei	Rossiya / 785	Omsk	(Soviet Union) → (Russia)	RRR 140048	
River Adagio		2003	125.5 m (412 ft)	164	Grand Circle Travel		Valletta	→	ENI 07001803	
River Allegro		1991	110.0 m (361 ft)	90	Grand Circle Travel		Valletta	(Germany) →	ENI 04031940	originally, the Dresden
River Empress		2002	110.0 m (361 ft)	134	Uniworld River Cruises		Basel		ENI 07001746	
River Duchess		2003	110.0 m (361 ft)	138	Uniworld River Cruises		Basel		ENI 07001805	
River Princess		2001	110.0 m (361 ft)	138	Uniworld River Cruises		Rheinfelden	(Netherlands) →	ENI 02325078	
Rossiya		1978	125.0 m (410 ft)	216	Grand Circle Cruise Line	Vladimir Ilyich / 301	Moscow	(Soviet Union) → (Ukraine) → (Russia)	IMO 7638155	originally, the Rossiya, formerly Sovetskaya Rossiya; RRR 233720
Royal Crown		1996	109.90 m (361 ft)	90	Euro Shipping Voyages		Hamburg	(Germany)	ENI 07001647	originally, the River Cloud
Rügen		1979	83.03 m (272 ft)	99	Quality Tours ApS		Oberwesel	(Germany)	ENI 04031590	originally, the Spree Berlin, formerly St. Alban, Victoria,Polonaise
Rus		1987	129.1 m (424 ft)	318	Vodohod	Dmitriy Furmanov/302	Nizhny Novgorod	(Soviet Union) → (Russia)	IMO 8707666	RRR 219752
Ryleev		1957	95.8 m (314 ft)		Farvater	Rodina / 588	Nizhny Novgorod	(Soviet Union) → (Russia)	RRR 082244	originally, the Dmitriy Donskoy, formerly Kabarginъ
Sankt-Peterburg		1975	125.0 m (410 ft)	296	Vodohod	Vladimir Ilyich / 301	Saint Petersburg	(Soviet Union) → (Russia)	RRR 160201	originally, the Vladimir Ilyich
Sans Souci		2000	82.0 m (269 ft)	81	Transocean		Peißen	(Germany)	ENI 02324177	
Saxonia		2001	82.0 m (269 ft)	89	Scylla		Basel		ENI 07001736	
Scenic Crystal		2012	135.0 m (443 ft)	171	Scenic Tours		Valletta		ENI 02334159	
Scenic Diamond		2009	135.0 m (443 ft)	169	Scenic Tours		Valletta		ENI 02330594	
Scenic Emerald		2008	135.0 m (443 ft)	171	Scenic Tours		Valletta		ENI 04806790	
Scenic Pearl		2011	135.0 m (443 ft)	171	Scenic Tours		Valletta		ENI 65000002	
Scenic Ruby		2009	135.0 m (443 ft)	169	Scenic Tours		Valletta		ENI 07001907	
Scenic Sapphire		2008	135.0 m (443 ft)	171	Scenic Tours		Valletta		ENI 02330040	
Semyon Budyonnyy		1981	135.75 m (445 ft)	300	Vodohod	Valerian Kuybyshev / 92-016	Nizhny Novgorod	(Soviet Union) → (Russia)	RRR 140662	
Sergey Dyagilev		1983	129.1 m (424 ft)	242	Orthodox Cruise Company	Dmitriy Furmanov / 302	Rostov-on-Don	(Soviet Union) → (Russia)	RRR 160221	originally, the Novikov-Priboy
Sergey Kuchkin		1979	135.75 m (445 ft)	300	Vodohod	Valerian Kuybyshev / 92-016	Nizhny Novgorod	(Soviet Union) → (Russia)	RRR 140658	originally, the Georgiy Dimitrov
Sergey Obraztsov		1961	77.91 m (256 ft)	153	MosTur Flot	Dunay / 305	Moscow	(Soviet Union) → (Russia)	RRR 142947	originally, the Vilyuy, formerly N. G. Slavyanov
Sergey Yesenin		1985	90.4 m (297 ft)	160	MosTurFlot	Sergey Yesenin / Q-065	Moscow	(Soviet Union) → (Russia)	RRR 216301	
Shlisselburg		1955	65.2 m (214 ft)			Baykal / 646	Nizhny Novgorod	(Soviet Union) → (Ukraine) → (Russia)	RRR 142519	originally, the Belinskiy
Dmitriy Furmanov		1983	129.1 m (424 ft)	318	Asurit	Dmitriy Furmanov / 302	Nizhny Novgorod	(Soviet Union) → (Russia)	IMO 8218598	originally, the Dmitriy Furmanov, RRR 160219
Solnechnyy Gorod		1956	95.8 m (314 ft)	227		Rodina / 588	Rostov-on-Don	(Soviet Union) → (Russia)	RRR 142510	originally, the Karl Libknekht, formerly Y. Nikulin
Spirit of Chartwell		1997	63.9 m (210 ft)	32	DouroAzul		London →	Portugal	IMO 8739384	ENI 07001842 originally, the Vincent van Gogh, formerly Charlemagne
Swiss Corona		2004	110.0 m (361 ft)	155	Scylla		Basel		ENI 07001807	
Swiss Crown		2000	110.0 m (361 ft)	154	Scylla		Basel		ENI 07001725	
Swiss Crystal		1995	101.3 m (332 ft)	125	Scylla		Basel		ENI 07001643	
Swiss Diamond		1996	101.3 m (332 ft)	123	Scylla		Basel		ENI 07001646	
Swiss Emerald		2006	110.0 m (361 ft)	124	Scylla		Basel		ENI 07001825	
Swiss Gloria		2005	110.0 m (361 ft)	153	Scylla		Basel		ENI 07001814	
Swiss Jewel		2009	110.0 m (361 ft)	124	Scylla		Basel		ENI 07001906	
Swiss Pearl		1993	110.0 m (361 ft)	123	Scylla		Basel		ENI 07001632	
Swiss Ruby		2002	85.0 m (279 ft)	88	Scylla		Basel		ENI 07001742	
Swiss Sapphire		2008	110.0 m (361 ft)	124	Scylla		Basel		ENI 07001858	
Swiss Tiara		2006	110.0 m (361 ft)	153	Scylla		Basel		ENI 07001832	
T. G. Shevchenko		1958	80.22 m (263 ft)	233		Rossiya / 785	Kiev	(Soviet Union)	unknown	originally, the V. I. Lenin (ukr.); hotelship near Chernobyl Nuclear Power Plant after Chernobyl disaster, out of service in 1989, later sank
Theodor Körner		1965	85.53 m (281 ft)	161	Concordia Cruises		Vienna	(Austria)	ENI 30000218	
Tikhiy Don		1977	125.0 m (410 ft)	216	Phoenix	Vladimir Ilyich / 301	Rostov-on-Don	(Soviet Union) → (Russia)	IMO 7523752	RRR 160204
Tosca		2009	72.0 m (236 ft)	82	Uniworld Boutique River Cruises		Cairo	(Egypt)	unknown	
Travelmarvel Diamond		2007	135.0 m (443 ft)	170	Australian Pacific Touring	TwinCruiser	Valletta		ENI 09948014	built as Avalon Imagery
Travelmarvel Jewel		2007	135.0 m (443 ft)	170	Australian Pacific Touring	TwinCruiser	Valletta		ENI 09948015	built as Avalon Tranquility
Treasures		2010	110.0 m (361 ft)	158	Scylla		Basel		ENI 07001943	
Ukraina	Info	1952	80.22 m (263 ft)	233		Rossiya / 785	Gorky	(Soviet Union) → (Russia)	unknown	burnt on Don; out of service in 1953
Ukraina		1979	115.66 m (379 ft)	150		Ukraina / Q-053	Izmail	(Soviet Union) → (Ukraine)	ENI 42000001	originally, the Ukraina (Украина)
V. Chkalov		1954	95.8 m (314 ft)	150	PassazhirRechTrans	Rodina / 588	Krasnoyarsk	(Soviet Union) → (Russia)	RRR 142501	
Valentina Tereshkova		1958	95.8 m (314 ft)			Rodina / 588	Astrakhan	(Soviet Union)	unknown	originally, the Elbrus, out of service in 1978, scrapped
Valerian Kuybyshev		1976	135.75 m (445 ft)	300	Vodohod	Valerian Kuybyshev / 92-016	Nizhny Novgorod	(Soviet Union) → (Russia)	RRR 140655; scrapped in 2018	
Valeriy Bryusov		1985	90.4 m (297 ft)	160	MosTurFlot	Sergey Yesenin / Q-065	Moscow	(Soviet Union) → (Russia)	RRR 216303	
Vienna I		2006	135.0 m (443 ft)	164	Viking River Cruises	TwinCruiser	Valletta		ENI 09948012	originally, the Avalon Tapestry
Viking Aegir		2012	135.0 m (443 ft)	190	Viking River Cruises	Viking Long Ship	Basel		ENI 07001957	
Viking Akun		1988	129.1 m (424 ft)	240	Viking River Cruises	Dmitriy Furmanov / 302	Saint Petersburg	(Soviet Union) → (Ukraine) → (Russia)	IMO 8707707	originally, the Marshal Koshevoy; RRR 222704
Viking Alsvin		2014	135.0 m (443 ft)	190	Viking River Cruises	Viking Long Ship	Basel		ENI 07001989	
Viking Astrild		2015	109.90 m (361 ft)	98	Viking River Cruises		Basel		ENI 07002023	Identical to Viking Beyla
Viking Atla		2013	135.0 m (443 ft)	190	Viking River Cruises	Viking Long Ship	Basel		ENI 07001968	
Viking Baldur		2013	135.0 m (443 ft)	190	Viking River Cruises	Viking Long Ship	Basel		ENI 07001969	
Viking Bestla		2014	135.0 m (443 ft)	190	Viking River Cruises	Viking Long Ship	Basel		ENI 07001988	
Viking Beyla		2015	109.90 m (361 ft)	98	Viking River Cruises		Basel		ENI 07002022	Identical to Viking Astrild
Viking Bragi		2012	135.0 m (443 ft)	190	Viking River Cruises	Viking Long Ship	Basel		ENI 07001961	
Viking Buri		2014	135.0 m (443 ft)	190	Viking River Cruises	Viking Long Ship	Basel		ENI 07001978	
Viking Delling		2014	135.0 m (443 ft)	190	Viking River Cruises	Viking Long Ship	Basel		ENI 07001982	
Viking Eir		2015	135.0 m (443 ft)	190	Viking River Cruises	Viking Long Ship	Basel		ENI 07002021	
Viking Eistla		2014	135.0 m (443 ft)	190	Viking River Cruises	Viking Long Ship	Basel		ENI 07001987	
Viking Embla		2012	135.0 m (443 ft)	190	Viking River Cruises	Viking Long Ship	Basel		ENI 07001956	
Viking Europe		2001	114.34 m (375 ft)	150	Viking River Cruises		Oberwesel	(Germany)	ENI 04800250	
Viking Forseti		2013	135.0 m (443 ft)	190	Viking River Cruises	Viking Long Ship	Basel		ENI 07001965	
Viking Freya		2012	135.0 m (443 ft)	190	Viking River Cruises	Viking Long Ship	Basel		ENI 07001954	
Viking Gefjon		2015	135.0 m (443 ft)	190	Viking River Cruises	Viking Long Ship	Basel		ENI 07002016	
Viking Gullveig		2014	135.0 m (443 ft)	190	Viking River Cruises	Viking Long Ship	Basel		ENI 07001984	
Viking Heimdal		2014	135.0 m (443 ft)	190	Viking River Cruises	Viking Long Ship	Basel		ENI 07001979	
Viking Helgi		1984	129.1 m (424 ft)	210	Viking River Cruises	Dmitriy Furmanov / 302	Saint Petersburg	(Soviet Union) → (Russia)	IMO 8422606	originally, the Aleksey Surkov; RRR 160222
Viking Helvetia		2006	131.8 m (432 ft)	198	Viking River Cruises		Oberwesel	(Germany)	ENI 04804700	
Viking Hermod		2014	135.0 m (443 ft)	190	Viking River Cruises	Viking Long Ship	Basel		ENI 07001977	
Viking Hlin		2014	135.0 m (443 ft)	190	Viking River Cruises	Viking Long Ship	Basel		ENI 07002001	
Viking Idi		2014	135.0 m (443 ft)	190	Viking River Cruises	Viking Long Ship	Basel		ENI 07001992	
Viking Idun		2012	135.0 m (443 ft)	190	Viking River Cruises	Viking Long Ship	Basel		ENI 07001951	
Viking Ingvar		1990	129.1 m (424 ft)	210	Viking River Cruises	Dmitriy Furmanov / 302	Saint Petersburg	(Soviet Union) → (Russia)	RRR 222709	originally, the Narkom Pakhomov
Viking Ingvi		2014	135.0 m (443 ft)	190	Viking River Cruises	Viking Long Ship	Basel		ENI 07001973	
Viking Jarl		2013	135.0 m (443 ft)	190	Viking River Cruises	Viking Long Ship	Basel		ENI 07001970	
Viking Kara		2014	135.0 m (443 ft)	190	Viking River Cruises	Viking Long Ship	Basel		ENI 07002000	
Viking Kvasir		2014	135.0 m (443 ft)	190	Viking River Cruises	Viking Long Ship	Basel		ENI unknown	
Viking Legend		2009	134.9 m (443 ft)	189	Viking River Cruises	Viking Long Ship	Basel		ENI 07001911	
Viking Lif		2014	135.0 m (443 ft)	190	Viking River Cruises	Viking Long Ship	Basel		ENI 07001983	
Viking Lofn		2015	135.0 m (443 ft)	190	Viking River Cruises	Viking Long Ship	Basel		ENI 07002020	
Viking Magni		2013	135.0 m (443 ft)	190	Viking River Cruises	Viking Long Ship	Basel		ENI 07001972	
Viking Mani		2014	135.0 m (443 ft)	190	Viking River Cruises	Viking Long Ship	Basel		ENI 07002003	
Viking Mississippi		2022	137.0 m (449 ft)	193	Viking River Cruises		New Orleans	(United States)		
Viking Modi		2015	135.0 m (443 ft)	190	Viking River Cruises	Viking Long Ship	Basel		ENI 07002017	
Viking Neptune		2001	114.34 m (375 ft)	150	Viking River Cruises		Oberwesel	(Germany)	ENI 04804700	
Viking Njord		2012	135.0 m (443 ft)	190	Viking River Cruises	Viking Long Ship	Basel		ENI 07001955	
Viking Odin		2012	135.0 m (443 ft)	190	Viking River Cruises	Viking Long Ship	Basel		ENI 07001950	
Viking Prestige		2011	134.9 m (443 ft)	188	Viking River Cruises		Basel		ENI 07001942	
Viking Pride		2001	114.34 m (375 ft)	150	Viking River Cruises		Oberwesel	(Germany)	ENI 04800210	
Viking Rinda		2013	135.0 m (443 ft)	190	Viking River Cruises	Viking Long Ship	Basel		ENI 07001966	
Viking Rurik		1975	125.0 m (410 ft)	196	Viking River Cruises	Vladimir Ilyich / 301	Saint Petersburg	(Soviet Union) → (Russia)	RRR 160202	originally, the Mariya Ulyanova, formerly Petergof
Viking Sigyn		2019	135.0 m (443 ft)	190	Viking River Cruises	Viking Long Ship	Basel		ENI 07002115	Involved in the Hableány disaster.
Viking Sineus		1979	125.0 m (410 ft)	360	Viking Ukraina	Vladimir Ilyich / 301	Kherson	(Soviet Union) → (Russia) → (Ukraine)	IMO 7823994	originally, the Mikhail Lomonosov; RSU 2-306367
Viking Skadi		2013	135.0 m (443 ft)	190	Viking River Cruises	Viking Long Ship	Basel		ENI 07001960	
Viking Spirit		2002	114.34 m (375 ft)	150	Viking River Cruises		Oberwesel	(Germany)	ENI 04800380	
Viking Tor		2013	135.0 m (443 ft)	190	Viking River Cruises	Viking Long Ship	Basel		ENI 07001962	
Viking Truvor		1987	129.1 m (424 ft)	210	Viking River Cruises	Dmitriy Furmanov / 302	Saint Petersburg	(Soviet Union) → (Russia)	RRR 222702	originally, the Sergey Kirov
Viking Var		2013	135.0 m (443 ft)	190	Viking River Cruises	Viking Long Ship	Basel		ENI 07001963	
Viking Ve		2015	135.0 m (443 ft)	190	Viking River Cruises	Viking Long Ship	Basel		ENI 07002015	
Viking Vidar		2015	135.0 m (443 ft)	190	Viking River Cruises	Viking Long Ship	Basel		ENI 07002019	
Viktoria		2004	127.7 m (419 ft)	180	KD Cruise Services		Valletta		ENI 09948008	
Viktoriya	Image	1958	80.22 m (263 ft)	180	MVK	Rossiya / 785	Moscow	(Soviet Union) → (Russia)	RRR 140086	originally, the A. S. Griboyedov, formerly I. I. Shishkin
Virginia		1965	67.51 m (221 ft)	138	Trans River Line		Rotterdam	(Netherlands)	ENI 02207430	
Vissarion Belinskiy		1980	125.0 m (410 ft)	293	Vodohod	Vladimir Ilyich / 301	Saint Petersburg	(Soviet Union) → (Russia)	RRR 160212	
Vistaprima		2010	110.0 m (361 ft)	158	Scylla		Basel		ENI 07001923	
Vladimir Mayakovskiy		1978	125.0 m (410 ft)	196	Kama One Shipping	Vladimir Ilyich / 301	Perm	(Soviet Union) → (Russia)	RRR 160207	
Volga		1970	105.9 m (347 ft)	140	UDP	Volga / Q-031	Izmail	(Soviet Union) → (Ukraine)	ENI 42000003	
Volga Star		1983	129.1 m (424 ft)	240	Orthodox Cruise Company	Dmitriy Furmanov/302	Rostov-on-Don	(Soviet Union) → (Ukraine) → (Russia)	IMO 8326008	originally, the Akademik Viktor Glushkov, formerly (ukr.) Akademik Viktor Glushkov, Akademik Viktor Glushkov; Igor Stravinskiy RRR 160220
William Shakespeare		2014	110.0 m (361 ft)	152	Select Voyages AG		Arnhem	(Netherlands)	ENI 02335914	
Xian Na	Image	1991	129.1 m (424 ft)	258	Regal China Cruises	Dmitriy Furmanov/302MK	Nantong	(China)	unknown	
Xian Ting		1991	129.1 m (424 ft)	258	Regal China Cruises	Dmitriy Furmanov/302MK	Nantong	(China)	unknown	
Y. Dolgorukiy		1960	95.8 m (314 ft)			Rodina / 588	Nizhny Novgorod	(Soviet Union) → (Russia)	RRR 083722	scrapped in 2012
Yuriy Andropov		1986	129.1 m (424 ft)	275		Dmitriy Furmanov / 302	Rostov-on-Don	(Soviet Union) → (Russia)	RRR 219749	since 2010 hotelship at Kurmangasy-oilfield (Курмангазы) Yuriy Andropov image
Zeina		1993	72.0 m (236 ft)		Song of Egypt Nile Cruises			(Egypt)	unknown	
Zosima Shashkov		1986	129.1 m (424 ft)	298	Vodohod	Dmitriy Furmanov / 302	Nizhny Novgorod	(Soviet Union) → (Russia)	RRR 219750	

== See also ==
- List of cruise ships
