= Lev Tolstoy (disambiguation) =

Lev Tolstoy (1828–1910) was a Russian author.

Lev Tolstoy may also refer to:

- Lev Tolstoy (film), 1984 Soviet film about the author
- Lev Tolstoy (rural locality), a settlement in Russia
- Lev Tolstoy (ship), Soviet and Russian cruise ship

== See also ==
- Lev (given name)
- Lev Lvovich Tolstoy born 1869, Russian writer and fourth child of Lev Tolstoy
- Tolstoy family
