= Dunay-class motorship =

Class of Russian river passenger ships

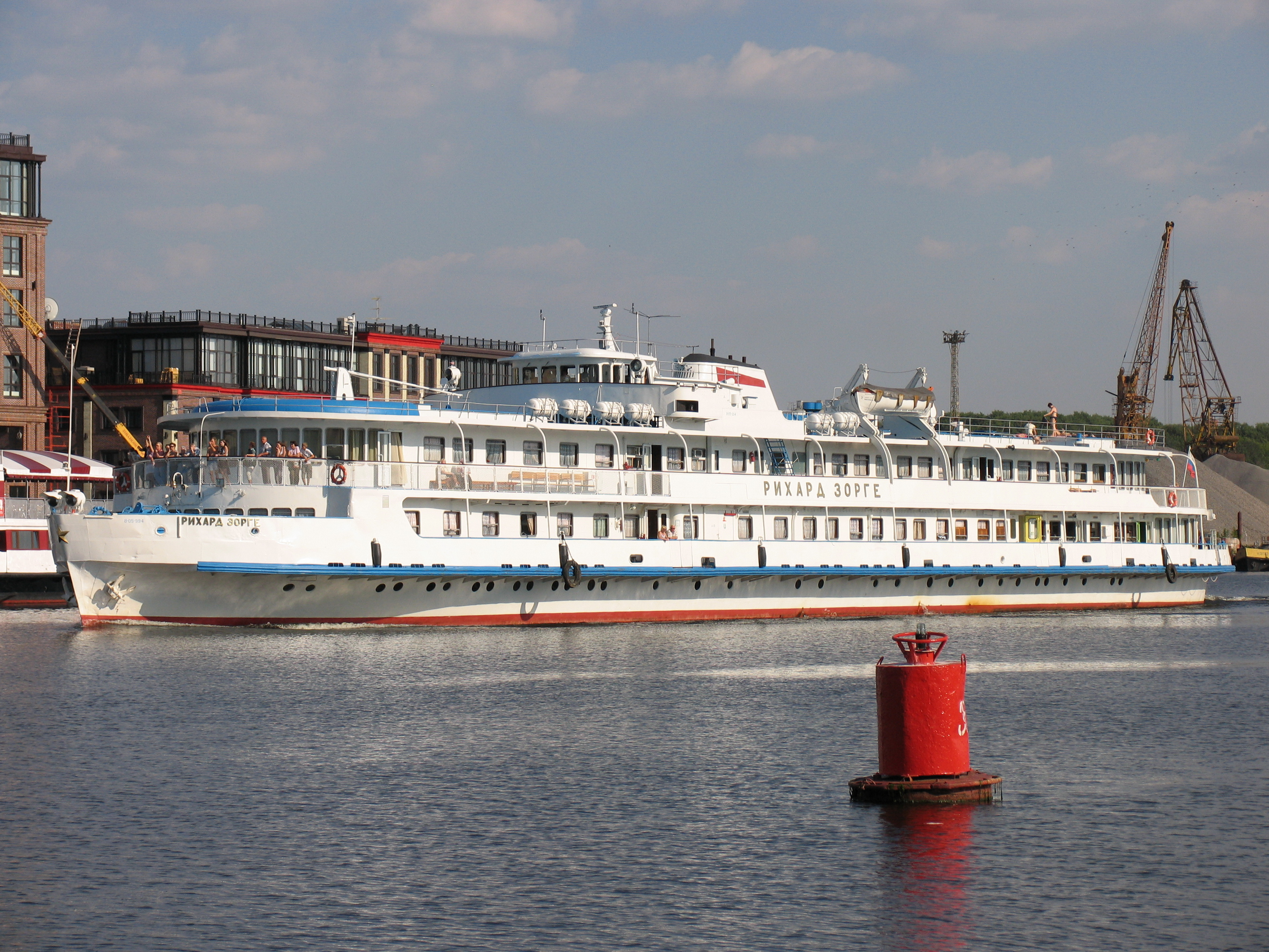
- River cruise ship Rikhard Zorge - Project 305

Class overview
- Builders: Obuda Hajogyar, Budapest, Hungary
- Built: 1959–1964
- In service: 1959
- Planned: 47
- Building: 47
- Completed: 47

General characteristics
- Type: River cruise ship
- Displacement: 800 t
- Length: 77.91 m (255.6 ft)
- Beam: 15.2 m (50 ft)
- Draught: 1.36 m (4.5 ft)
- Decks: 2 passenger decks
- Installed power: 2 × 8NVD36 or 6NVD36 4-cycle noncompressor reversive diesels 588 kilowatts (789 hp)
- Propulsion: 2
- Speed: 20 km/h (12 mph; 11 kn)
- Capacity: 311 passengers
- Crew: 55

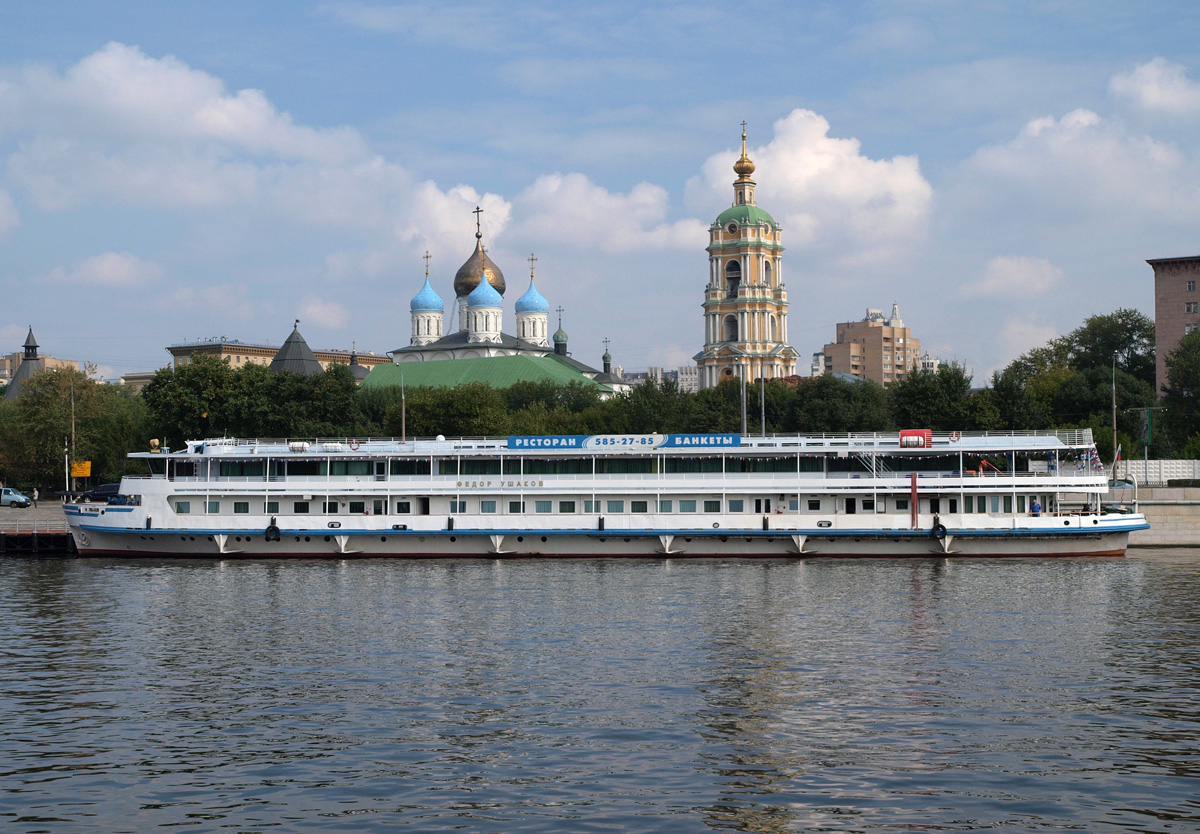
Floating restaurant Fyodor Ushakov, originally passenger ship Kuban (built in Hungary in 1963, see also Dunay class motorship, Дунай (тип речных судов)) parked in front of Novospassky Monastery, Moscow

The Dunay class is a class of Russian river passenger ships, named after Danube River. They are two-deck cargo-passenger ships built in Hungary between 1959 and 1964.

== River cruise ships of the Hungarian project 305 ==
Dunay-class motorship
| No. | Original name | English transliteration |
|---|---|---|
| 1 | Дунай (Александр Блок) | Dunay (Aleksandr Blok) |
| 2 | Дон (Виталий Закруткин, Európa) | Don (Vitaliy Zakrutkin, Európa) |
| 3 | Днепр (Михаил Назаров, Дон, Владимир Мономах, Анна Ахматова) | Dnepr (Mikhail Nazarov, Don, Vladimir Monomakh, Anna Akhmatova) |
| 4 | Днестр (Герой Ю. Гагарин) | Dnestr (Geroy Y. Gagarin) |
| 5 | Ахтуба (В. Хользунов) | Akhtuba (V. Kholzunov) |
| 6 | Ангара (В. М. Зайцев) | Angara (V. M. Zaytsev) |
| 7 | Аргунь (Герой Александр Головачёв) | Argun (Geroy Aleksandr Golovachyov) |
| 8 | Аракс (Михаил Чеботарёв, Адеми) | Araks (Mikhail Chebotaryov, Ademi) |
| 9 | Алдан | Aldan |
| 10 | Аму-Дарья (Николай Островский, Казань) | Amu-Darya (Nikolay Ostrovskiy, Kazan) |
| 11 | Анадырь (М. Вахитов, Мулланур Вахитов) | Anadyr (M. Vakhitov, Mullanur Vakhitov) |
| 12 | Баргузин (Муса Гареев) | Barguzin (Musa Gareyev) |
| 13 | Арагва (Николай Зеров) | Aragva (Nikolay Zerov) |
| 14 | Белая (Л. В. Собинов, Видин) | Belaya (L. V. Sobinov, Vidin) |
| 15 | Березина (Мотовилихинский Рабочий, Бородино) | Berezina (Motovilikhinskiy Rabochiy, Borodino) |
| 16 | Буг (Григорий Пирогов) | Bug (Grigoriy Pirogov) |
| 17 | Бурея (Сергей Даньщин) | Bureya (Sergey Danyshchin) |
| 18 | Вычегда (Герой А. Сутырин) | Vychegda (Geroy A. Sutyrin) |
| 19 | Вишера | Vishera |
| 20 | Вилюй (Н. Г. Славянов, С. Образцов) | Vilyuy (N. G. Slavyanov, S. Obraztsov) |
| 21 | Волхов (Александр Свешников) | Volkhov (Aleksandr Sveshnikov) |
| 22 | Десна (Борис Полевой) | Desna (Boris Polevoy) |
| 23 | Енисей (Федор Кибальник) | Yenisey (Fedor Kibalnik) |
| 24 | Зея (Капитан Пирожков, Град Китеж, Паллада) | Zeya (Kapitan Pirozhkov, Grad Kitezh, Pallada) |
| 25 | Висла (Павел Миронов) | Visla (Pavel Mironov) |
| 26 | Даугава (Алексей Киселев, Башкортостан) | Daugava (Aleksey Kiselev, Bashkortostan) |
| 27 | Индигирка (Адмирал Кузнецов) | Indigirka (Admiral Kuznetsov) |
| 28 | Неман (Федор Абрамов) | Neman (Fedor Abramov) |
| 29 | Олекма (М. В. Ломоносов) | Olekma (M. V. Lomonosov) |
| 30 | Пинега (Ганза, Hansa) | Pinega (Ganza, Hansa) |
| 31 | Свияга (Александр Шемагин, Ласточка-2) | Sviyaga (Aleksandr Shemagin, Lastochka-2) |
| 32 | Чулым (Г. Тукай) | Chulym (G. Tukay) |
| 33 | Ветлуга (Салават Юлаев) | Vetluga (Salavat Yulayev) |
| 34 | Днестр (Павел Юдин) | Dnestr (Pavel Yudin) |
| 35 | Кубань (Александр Пирогов, Фёдор Ушаков, Нерей) | Kuban (Aleksandr Pirogov, Fyodor Ushakov, Nerey) |
| 36 | Истра (Борис Чирков) | Istra (Boris Chirkov) |
| 37 | Сура (Профессор Звонков, Александр Свирский) | Sura (Professor Zvonkov, Aleksandr Svirskiy) |
| 38 | Сухона (Степан Здоровцев, Эрмитаж) | Sukhona (Stepan Zdorovtsev, Ermitazh) |
| 39 | Сыр-Дарья (Юрий Завадский) | Syr-Darya (Yuriy Zavadskiy) |
| 40 | Сунгари (Рихард Зорге) | Sungari (Rikhard Zorge) |
| 41 | Терек (Комдив Гай) | Terek (Komdiv Gay) |
| 42 | Урал (Николай Масленников) | Ural (Nikolay Maslennikov) |
| 43 | Михаил Калинин (Ремикс) | Mikhail Kalinin (Remiks) |
| 44 | Патрис Лумумба (Парис) | Patris Lumumba (Paris) |
| 45 | Василий Чапаев | Vasiliy Chapayev |
| 46 | Марина Раскова (Бригантина) | Marina Raskova (Brigantina) |
| 47 | Мария Ульянова (Виктор Гашков) | Mariya Ulyanova (Viktor Gashkov) |

== Overview ==
Dunay class
| Month and year of build | Hull No | Image | Name | Customer | Port of registry | Flag | Status |
|---|---|---|---|---|---|---|---|
| 1959 | 1535 | Image | Aleksandr Blok | Volga-Don Shipping Company | Rostov-on-Don → unknown → Moscow | → | originally, the Dunay; No. 142911 (RRR) |
| 1959 | 1536 | | Európa | Volga-Don Shipping Company | Rostov-on-Don → Budapest | → | originally, the Don, formerly Vitaliy Zakrutkin; |
| 1959 | 1537 | | Anna Akhmatova | Volga-Don Shipping Co. | Rostov-on-Don → Moscow | → | originally, the Dnepr, formerly Mikhail Nazarov, Don, Vladimir Monomakh; No. 142913 (RRR); burned out on January 29, 2012 |
| 1959 | 1540 | | V. Kholzunov | Volga Shipping Company | Gorky → Nizhny Novgorod | → | originally, the Akhtuba; laid up in 1998 |
| September 1960 | 1546 | | Aldan | Volga-Don Shipping Company | Rostov-on-Don → Nizhny Novgorod | → | No. 142922 (RRR) |
| 21 June 1961 | | | Borodino | Kama Shipping Co. | Chistopol → Nizhny Novgorod | → | originally, the Berezina, formerly Motovilikhinskiy Rabochiy; No. 142940 (RRR) |
| 1961 | | | Grigoriy Pirogov | Moskva River Shipping Co. | Kasimov → Moscow | → | originally, the Bug; No. 142943 (RRR) |
| 1961 | 1570 | | Sergey Obraztsov | MosTurFlot | Chistopol → Moscow | → | originally, the Vilyuy, formerly N. G. Slavyanov; RRR 142947 |
| December 1961 | 1571 | | Aleksandr Sveshnikov | Volga Shipping Company | Gorky → Nizhny Novgorod | → | originally, the Volkhov; No. 142948 (RRR) |
| December 1961 | 1572 | | Boris Polevoy | Kama Shipping Co. | Chistopol → Kazan | → | originally, the Desna; No. 142949 (RRR) |
| 1962 | 1545 | | Mikhail Chebotaryov | Volga-Don Shipping Company | Rostov-on-Don → Kaliningrad | → | originally, the Araks; No. 142921 (RRR) |
| March 1962 | 1576 | | Pallada | Kama Shipping Co. | Chistopol → Moscow | → | originally, the Zeya, formerly Kapitan Pirozhkov, Grad Kitezh; No. 142954 (RRR) |
| June 1962 | 1586 | | Bashkortostan | Moskva River Shipping Co. | Moscow → Ufa | → | originally, the Daugava, formerly Aleksey Kiselev; No. 142961 (RRR) |
| 1962 | 1588 | | Fedor Abramov | Northern River Shipping Co. | Arkhangelsk → Moscow | → | originally, the Neman; No. 142963 (RRR) |
| September 1962 | 1589 | | M. V. Lomonosov | Northern River Shipping Co. | Arkhangelsk → Moscow | → | originally, the Olekma, No. 142964 (RRR) |
| 1962 | 1591 | | Lastochka-2 | Moskva River Shipping Co. | Moscow | → | originally, the Sviyaga, formerly Aleksandr Shemagin; No. 142966 (RRR) |
| September 1962 | 1592 | | G. Tukay | Belaya Shipping Co. | Ufa | → | originally, the Chulym; No. 142967 (RRR) |
| May 1963 | 1593 | | S. Yulaev | Bashkirian Shipping Co. | Ufa | → | originally, the Vetluga; No. 142968 (RRR) |
| 1963 | | | Nerey | VIP Co. | Moscow | → | originally, the Kuban, formerly Aleksandr Pirogov, Fyodor Ushakov; burned down 1 March 2018 RRR 142980 |
| 1963 | 1622 | | Aleksandr Svirskiy | Volga Shipping Company | Gorky → Nizhny Novgorod | → | originally, the Sura, formerly Professor Zvonkov; No. 142982 (RRR) |
| October 1963 | 1625 | | Rikhard Zorge | Volga Shipping Company | Gorky → Nizhny Novgorod | → | originally, the Sungari; No. 142985 (RRR) |
| June 1964 | 1630 | | Vasiliy Chapayev | Volga Shipping Company | Astrakhan → Ufa | → | No. 142990 (RRR) |

== See also ==
- List of river cruise ships
- Valerian Kuybyshev-class motorship
- Rossiya-class motorship (1952)
- Anton Chekhov-class motorship
- Vladimir Ilyich-class motorship
- Rodina-class motorship
- Baykal-class motorship
- Sergey Yesenin-class motorship
- Oktyabrskaya Revolyutsiya-class motorship
- Yerofey Khabarov-class motorship
- Dmitriy Furmanov-class motorship
