= CroisiEurope =

Cruise line

- Industry: Tourism
- Founder: Gérard Schmitter
- Headquarters: Strasbourg, France
- Area served: Europe, Asia
- Products: river cruises cruise line
- Number of employees: 1350 (2015)
- Website: www.croisieuroperivercruises.com

CroisiEurope (Alsace Croisières until 1997) is a French company founded by Gérard Schmitter in 1976, specializing in river and coastal cruises.

== Fleet ==
CroisiEurope currently has a fleet of over 50 vessels. Prestige category boats that cruise all of Europe's rivers. Accommodation capacity varies from 100 to 180 passengers depending on the ship's design.

The CroisiEurope fleet is partially renovated each year, being mostly made up of recently built vessels that are less than five years old.

French is the primary language spoken on the ships, although most staff members also speak English and other European languages. Ship announcements are made in French and in English.

RHINE AND DANUBE

| Ship name | Year built/Refit | Length | Guests | Staterooms | Image |
|---|---|---|---|---|---|
| Beethoven | 2004 | 360 ft (110 m) | 180 | 90 | |
| Douce France | 1997 | 360 ft (110 m) | 107 | 55 | |
| Gerard Schmitter | 2012 | 361 ft (110 m) | 174 | 87 | |
| France | 2001 | 360 ft (110 m) | 159 | 78 | |
| L’Europe | 2006 | 361 ft (110 m) | 180 | 90 | |
| La Boheme | 1995 | 360 ft (110 m) | 158 | 80 | |
| Lafayette | 1992 | 295 ft (90 m) | 82 | 43 | |
| Leonardo Da Vinci | 2003 | 344 ft (105 m) | 143 | 72 | |
| Modigliani | 2001 | 360 ft (110 m) | 159 | 78 | |
| Mona Lisa | 2000 | 269 ft (82 m) | 94 | 47 | |
| Monet | 1999 | 360 ft (110 m) | 158 | 78 | |
| Symphonie | 1997 | 361 ft (110 m) | 107 | 55 | |
| Victor Hugo | 2000 | 269 ft (82 m) | 90 | 45 | |
| Vivaldi | 2009 | 361 ft (110 m) | 176 | 88 | |
| R.E. Waydelich L.J. | 2018 | 334 ft (102 m) | 81 | 42 | |

SEINE

| Ship name | Year built/Refit | Length | Guests | Staterooms | Image |
|---|---|---|---|---|---|
| Botticelli | 2004 | 360 ft (110 m) | 149 | 75 | |
| Renoir | 1999 | 360 ft (110 m) | 105 | 54 | |
| Seine Princess | 2002 | 360 ft (110 m) | 138 | 67 | |

RHONE

| Ship name | Year built/Refit | Length | Guests | Staterooms | Image |
|---|---|---|---|---|---|
| Mistral | 1999 | 361 ft (110 m) | 157 | 78 | |
| Rhône Princess | 2001 | 361 ft (110 m) | 138 | 69 | |
| Camargue | 1995 | 361 ft (110 m) | 104 | 54 | |
| Van Gogh | 1999 | 360 ft (110 m) | 105 | 54 | |

GIRONDE

| Ship name | Year built/Refit | Length | Guests | Staterooms | Image |
|---|---|---|---|---|---|
| Cyrano de Bergerac | 2013 | 361 ft (110 m) | 174 | 87 | |

LOIRE

| Ship name | Year built/Refit | Length | Guests | Staterooms | Image |
|---|---|---|---|---|---|
| Loire Princesse | 2015 | 295 ft (90 m) | 96 | 48 | |

ELBE

| Ship name | Year built/Refit | Length | Guests | Staterooms | Image |
|---|---|---|---|---|---|
| Elbe Princesse | 2016 | 312 ft (95 m) | 80 | 40 | |
| Elbe Princesse II | 2017 | 331 ft (101 m) | 95 | 45 | |

DOURO

| Ship name | Year built/Refit | Length | Guests | Staterooms | Image |
|---|---|---|---|---|---|
| Fenrnao de Magalhaes | 2003 | 246 ft (75 m) | 142 | 71 | |
| Gil Eanes | 2015 | 262 ft (80 m) | 142 | 66 | |
| Infante don Henrique | 2003 | 246 ft (75 m) | 142 | 71 | |
| Vasco de Gama | 2003 | 246 ft (75 m) | 142 | 71 | |
| Amalia Rodrigues | 2018 | 246 ft (75 m) | 142 | 66 | |
| Miguel Torga | 2017 | 246 ft (75 m) | 142 | 66 | |

GUADALQUIVIR

| Ship name | Year built/Refit | Length | Guests | Staterooms | Image |
|---|---|---|---|---|---|
| La Belle de Cadix | 2005 | 361 ft (110 m) | 176 | 88 | |

PO

| Ship name | Year built/Refit | Length | Guests | Staterooms | Image |
|---|---|---|---|---|---|
| Michelangelo | 2000 | 158 ft (48 m) | 158 | 78 | |

CANALS OF FRANCE AND BELGIUM

| Ship name | Year built/Refit | Length | Guests | Staterooms | Image |
|---|---|---|---|---|---|
| Anne-Marie | 2014 | 128 ft (39 m) | 24 | 12 | |
| Jeanine | 2013 | 130 ft (40 m) | 24 | 12 | |
| Madeleine | 2013 | 130 ft (40 m) | 24 | 12 | |
| Raymonde | 2013 | 130 ft (40 m) | 24 | 12 | |
| Danièle | 2016 | 130 ft (40 m) | 22 | 11 | |
| Déborah | 2016 | 130 ft (40 m) | 22 | 11 | |

COASTAL CRUISES

| Ship name | Year built/Refit | Length | Guests | Staterooms | Image |
|---|---|---|---|---|---|
| La Belle de L’Adriatique | 2007 | 360 ft (110 m) | 200 | 100 | |
| La Belle des Océans | 1990 | 337 ft (103 m) | 130 | 65 | |

MEKONG

| Ship name | Year built/Refit | Length | Guests | Staterooms | Image |
|---|---|---|---|---|---|
| Toum Tiou I | 2002 | 124 ft (38 m) | 20 | 10 | |
| Toum Tiou II | 2008 | 124 ft (38 m) | 28 | 14 | |
| Lan Diep | 2017 | 164 ft (50 m) | 44 | 22 | |
| Indochine I | 2008 | 167 ft (51 m) | 48 | 24 | |
| Indochine II | 2017 | 213 ft (65 m) | 62 | 31 | |

SOUTHERN AFRICA

| Ship name | Year built/Refit | Length | Guests | Staterooms | Image |
|---|---|---|---|---|---|
| African Dream | 2018 | 108 ft (33 m) | 16 | 8 | |
| Zimbabwean Dream | 2020 | 108 ft (33 m) | 16 | 8 | |

== Destinations ==
In France, CroisiEurope sails on the Seine, the Rhône, the Gironde, the Loire and the Rhine; in Italy, on the Po; in Spain, on the Guadalquivir; in Portugal, on the Douro; in Germany, Belgium, and the Netherlands, on the Rhine; in Germany, Austria, Hungary, Serbia, and Romania, on the Danube; and in Germany, on the Havel and the Oder.

CroisiEurope also has two coastal ship, the MS Belle de l'Adriatique and the MS Belle des Océans, which operates in the Mediterranean, the Adriatic, the Aegean and the Atlantic.
