= Oktyabrskaya Revolyutsiya-class motorship =

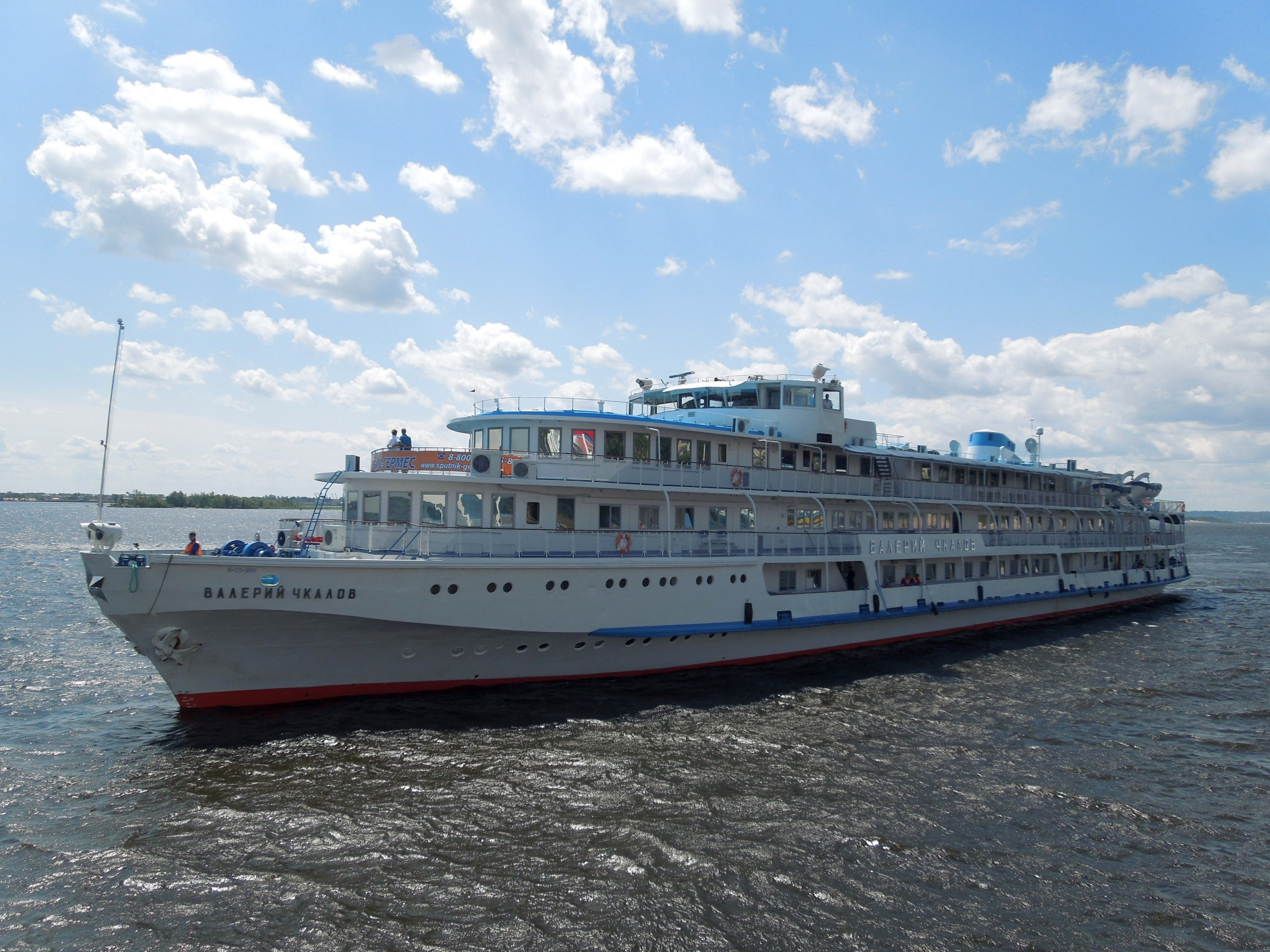
- River cruise ship Valeriy Chkalov on the Volga river in 2012

Class overview
- Builders: Slovenské Lodenice, Komárno, Czechoslovakia
- Built: 1957–1962
- Completed: 14

General characteristics
- Type: Passenger ship
- Displacement: 1,473 t
- Length: 96.27 m (315 ft 10 in)
- Beam: 14.98 m (49 ft 2 in)
- Draught: 2.39 m (7 ft 10 in)
- Decks: 3 passenger decks
- Installed power: 3 × 6L275B 1,158 kW (1,553 hp)
- Propulsion: 3
- Speed: 26 km/h (16 mph; 14 kn)
- Capacity: 312 passengers
- Crew: 70

The Oktyabrskaya Revolyutsiya-class motorship is a class of Russian river passenger ships. The class takes its named from the lead ship, Oktyabrskaya Revolyutsiya, which is named after the October Revolution. The vessels are three-deck cargo-passenger ships built in Czechoslovakia, from 1957 to 1962.

== River cruise ships of the project 26-37 ==
Oktyabrskaya Revolyutsiya class motorships
No.	Original name	English transliteration
1	Октябрьская Революция	Oktyabrskaya Revolyutsiya
2	Комарно (Волга Дрим)	Komarno (Volga Drim)
3	Мир (Афанасий Никитин)	Mir (Afanasiy Nikitin)
4	Дружба (Капитан Рачков, Сергей Абрамов)	Druzhba (Kapitan Rachkov, Sergey Abramov)
5	XXI Съезд КПСС (Капитан Пушкарёв)	XXI S'ezd KPSS (Kapitan Pushkaryov)
6	Яков Свердлов (Александр Бенуа)	Yakov Sverdlov (Aleksandr Benua)
7	Андрей Жданов (Иван Кулибин)	Andrey Zhdanov (Ivan Kulibin)
8	Серго Орджоникидзе (Н. А. Некрасов)	Sergo Ordzhonikidze (N. A. Nekrasov)
9	Клемент Готвальд (Профессор Лукачев, Екатерина Великая, Родная Русь)	Klement Gotvald (Professor Lukachev, Yekaterina Velikaya, Rodnaya Rus)
10	Клара Цеткин	Klara Tsetkin
11	Вацлав Воровский	Vatslav Vorovskiy
12	Валерий Чкалов	Valeriy Chkalov
13	Сергей Лазо (Президент)	Sergey Lazo (President)
14	Н. Щорс (Михаил Танич)	N. Shchors (Mikhail Tanich)

== See also ==
- List of river cruise ships
- Rossiya-class motorship
- Rossiya-class motorship (1973)
- Dmitriy Furmanov-class motorship
- Baykal-class motorship
- Rodina-class motorship
- Anton Chekhov-class motorship
- Vladimir Ilyich-class motorship
- Maksim Gorkiy-class motorship
- Sergey Yesenin-class motorship
