= Lev Tolstoy (ship) =

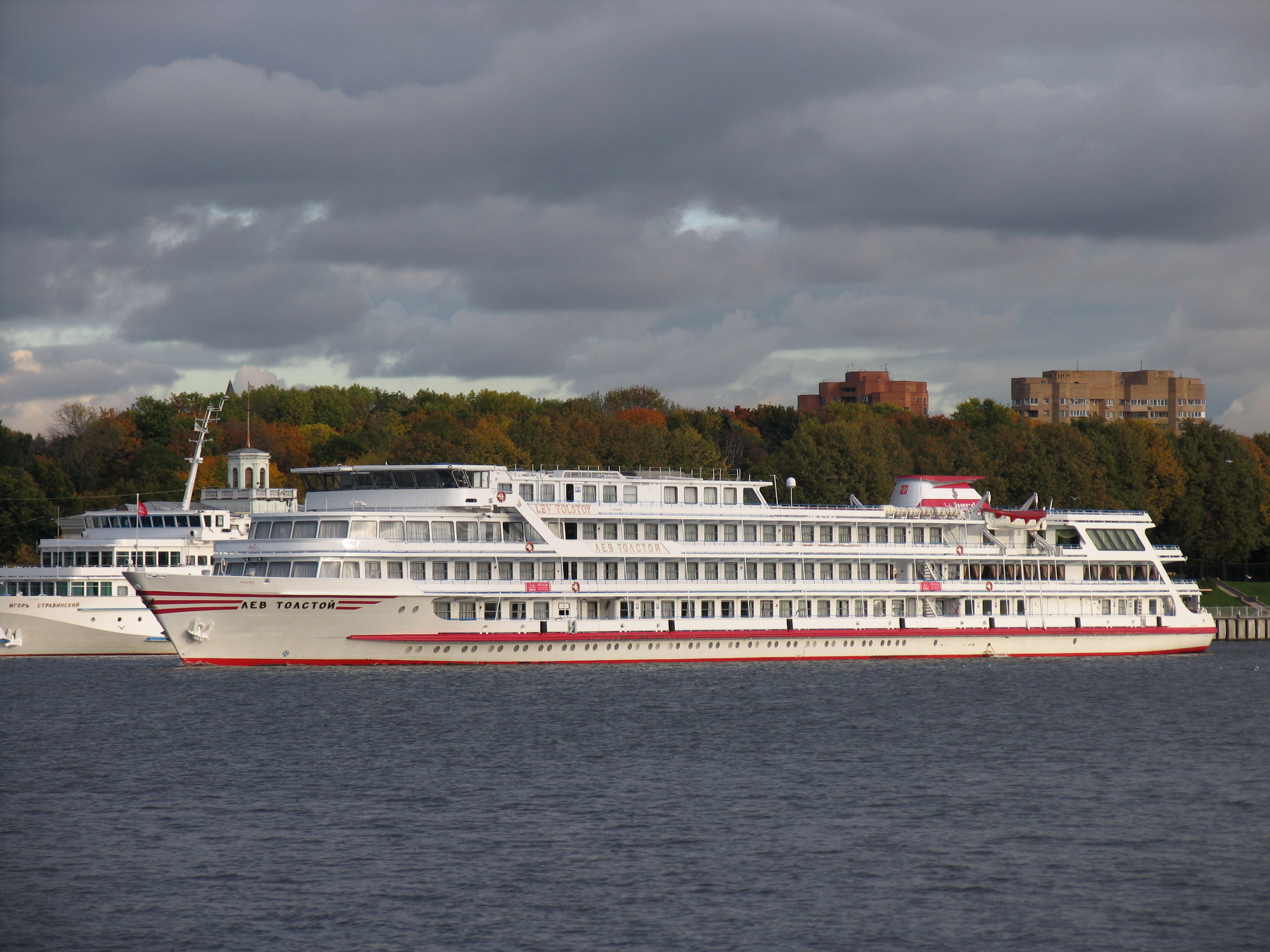
- Lev Tolstoy on the Volga

History

Soviet Union → Russia
- Name: Lev Tolstoy
- Namesake: Lev Tolstoy
- Owner: Vodohod
- Operator: Vodohod
- Route: St. Petersburg - Moscow - Astrakhan
- Builder: Österreichische Schiffswerften AG Linz Korneuburg (ÖSWAG),Austria
- Launched: 1979
- Completed: May 1979
- Home port: Nizhny Novgorod
- Identification: Hull no.: K714; MMSI number: 273350150
- Status: in service

General characteristics
- Class & type: Anton Chekhov-class river cruise ship
- Displacement: 2920 t.
- Length: 115.8 m (379 ft 11 in)
- Beam: 15.2 m (49 ft 10 in)
- Draught: 2.8 m (9 ft 2 in)
- Ice class: "O" (inland waterways, rivers and reservoirs)
- Installed power: 2,700
- Propulsion: 3 propellers
- Speed: 25.5 km/h (13.8 kn; 15.8 mph)
- Capacity: 160 people

Lev Tolstoy is a four-deck cruise ship (type Q-056), named after the famous Russian novelist Lev Tolstoy; and has been specifically designed to navigate European waterways. Lev Tolstoy was originally built to serve and transport high-ranking Kremlin officials and foreign dignitaries. It was built in Austria in 1979 and refurbished in 2012. It is still one of the top cruise ships in Russia.

== Description ==
Lev Tolstoy was primarily built for soviet high-ranking Kremlin officials and also to provide river cruises to the important foreign guest of the soviet government. Shipbuilding company Österreichische Schiffswerften AG (ÖSWAG) an Austrian company constructed the ship in Austria in May 1979. It was refurbished in the year 2012 and is currently owned and operated by Vodohod. It is a four-deck vessel with air-conditioned cabins with private facilities. It has single, double and triple accommodation cabins. All cabins face the water (approx. 29.5 sq. ft.) with low berths it provides a private bathroom with shower, air conditioning, radio, television, hair-dryer, heating and ventilation system, 220-volt sockets, room-to-room telephone and large window. Tolstoy accommodates 160 guests, other ships of the similar size normally accommodate 200-300 guests.

== Technical specifications ==
Its type – Q-056 Anton Chekhov-class river cruise vessel. It has five decks, four are passenger accessible. Its length is 115.8 m, width 15.2 m, immersion – 2.8 m, speed – 25 km per hour (around 17 MpH). It's a three propeller three engine vessel. It's an inland water transportation vessel designed for travel through rivers and water reservoirs. On-board generated electricity is 220 V AC. Passenger capacity is 160 persons. The number of cabins is 85. All cabins are air-conditioned and with a heating system. Its MMSI number is 273350150.

== Route ==
Lev Tolstoy cruises along Russian rivers and waterways, like the Volga River and Moscow canals and cruise from Moscow to St. Petersburg as well as Astrakhan to Moscow.
