= Rossiya-class motorship =

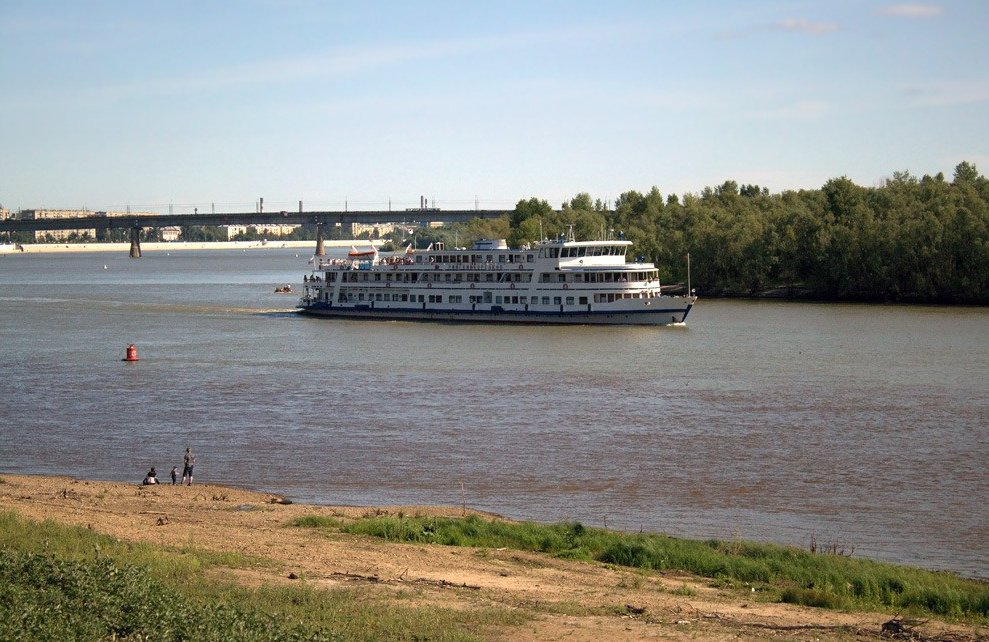
- River cruise ship Rimskiy Korsakov - Project 785 / OL800

Class overview
- Builders: Slovenské Lodenice, Komárno, Czechoslovakia
- In service: 1952
- Completed: 36

General characteristics
- Type: Cruise ship
- Tonnage: GT
- Length: 80.22 m (263.2 ft)
- Beam: 12.55 m (41.2 ft) ; third series 14.0 m (45.9 ft)
- Draught: 1.9 m (6.2 ft)
- Decks: 2 passenger decks
- Installed power: 3 × 6L275 588 kilowatts (789 hp)
- Propulsion: 3
- Speed: 20.5 km/h (12.7 mph; 11.1 kn)
- Capacity: 259 passengers

Rossiya class is a class of Russian river passenger ships, project 785. "Rossiya" means "Russia" in Russian. Two-deck cruise ships manufactured in Komárno, Czechoslovakia, 1952–1958. The shipyard's designation: OL800 (osobna lod - passenger motor ship 800 h.p.).

== River cruise ships of the project 785 / OL800 ==
Rossiya-class motorships
No.	Original name	English transliteration
First series of Project 785
1	Россия (Россич, Распутин)	Rossiya (Rossich, Rasputin)
2	Украина	Ukraina
3	Белоруссия	Belorussiya
4	Азербайджан	Azerbaydzhan
5	Грузия	Gruziya
6	Армения	Armeniya
7	Молдавия	Moldaviya
8	Узбекистан (Царь Пётр, Коломенский Штандарт)	Uzbekistan (Tsar Pyotr, Kolomenskiy Shtandart)
9	Казахстан	Kazakhstan
Second series of Project 785
10	Таджикистан (Кремас)	Tadzhikistan (Kremas)
11	Туркменистан	Turkmenistan
12	Киргизия (Петр Алабин)	Kirgiziya (Petr Alabin)
13	Карелия	Kareliya
14	Эстония (Киевская Русь, Князь Воронцов)	Estoniya (Kievskaya Rus, Knyaz Vorontsov)
15	Латвия (Михаил Годенко, Маяк)	Latviya (Mikhail Godenko, Mayak)
16	Литва	Litva
17	Украина (Булгария)	Ukraina (Bulgariya)
18	Мусоргский	Musorgskiy
19	Композитор Чайковский	Kompozitor Chaykovskiy
20	Бородин	Borodin
21	Римский-Корсаков	Rimskiy-Korsakov
22	Ипполитов-Иванов	Ippolitov-Ivanov
23	Антон Рубинштейн (Пересвет)	Anton Rubinshteyn (Peresvet)
24	Композитор Глазунов	Kompozitor Glazunov
25	Композитор Глинка	Kompozitor Glinka
Third series of Project 785
26	Композитор Калинников	Kompozitor Kalinnikov
27	Композитор Прокофьев	Kompozitor Prokofyev
28	Композитор Скрябин	Kompozitor Skryabin
29	Композитор Алябьев	Kompozitor Alyabyev
30	Композитор Балакирев	Kompozitor Balakirev
31	А. П. Чехов (Байкал, Капитан Родин)	A. P. Chekhov (Baykal, Kapitan Rodin)
32	М. Ю. Лермонтов	M. Y. Lermontov
33	А. С. Грибоедов (И. И. Шишкин, Виктория)	A. S. Griboyedov (I. I. Shishkin, Viktoria)
34	Радянський Союз	Radyansykyy Soyuz
35	В. I. Ленiн (Т. Г. Шевченко)	V. I. Lenin (T. G. Shevtchenko)
36	Карл Маркс	Karl Marks

== Overview ==
Rossiya-class ships
Year of build	Hull No	Series	Image	Name	Customer	Status
1952		I		Rasputin	Volga Shipping Company, Gorky	originally, the Rossiya, formerly: Rossich; hotelship near Chernobyl (1986–1989); scrapped in October 2011
1952		I		Ukraina (1952)	Volga Shipping Company, Gorky	burnt on Don and scrapped in 1953
1953		I	Image	Belorussiya	Volga Shipping Company, Gorky	1960 Kazan; hotelship near Chernobyl (1986–1989); out of service; scrapped in 1989
1953		I	Image	Azerbaydzhan	Volga Shipping Company, Gorky	hotelship near Chernobyl (1986–1989); WaterCenter near Sevastopol
1953		I	Image	Armeniya	Volga Shipping Company, Gorky	1961–1992 in Perm; out of service in 1989; near Chaikovskiy in Perm in 1993
1953		I	Image	Gruziya	Volga Shipping Company, Gorky	in Kazan in 1960; hotelship near Chernobyl (1986–1989); out of service
1953		I	Image	Moldaviya	Volga Shipping Company, Gorky	1962 Ob-Irtysh Shipping Company, Omsk; Volga-Don Shipping Company (Rostov-on-Don) (1975–1992), hotelship in Turkey, sank in September 1996
1953	318	I		Kolomenskiy Shtandart	Volga Shipping Company, Gorky	originally, the Uzbekistan, Tsar Petr; hotelship near Chernobyl (1986–1989); hotelship and cafè near Kolomenskoye in Moscow
1954		I	Image	Kazakhstan	Volga Shipping Company, Gorky	out of service
1954		II	Image	Kremas	Volga Shipping Company, Gorky	originally, the Kremas, formerly: Tadzhikistan; hotelship near Chernobyl (1986–1989); in Navashino for repair
1954		II	Image	Turkmenistan	Volga Shipping Company, Gorky	burnt in 1986, out of service
1954	328	II		Petr Alabin	Volga Shipping Company, Gorky	originally, the Kirgiziya; hotelship near Chernobyl (1986–1989); arrested on the Volga on July 15, 2011
1955	323	II	Image	Kareliya	Volga Shipping Company, Gorky	hotelship near Chernobyl (1986–1989); out of service in 2006
1955	324	II		Knyaz Vorontsov	Volga Shipping Company, Gorky	originally, the Estoniya, hotelship near Chernobyl (1986–1989); sold to Samara Kievskaya Rus (2003) OOO RusAgroTorg, Moscow
1955		II		Mayak	Volga Shipping Company, Gorky	originally, the Latviya, formerly: Mikhail Godenko; hotelship Mayak in Krasnoyarsk
1955	326	II		Litva	Volga Shipping Company, Gorky	sold to OOO Selikhov as hotelship in Krasnoyarsk
1955		II		Bulgariya	Volga Shipping Company, Gorky	originally, the Ukraina, sank on the Volga on July 10, 2011
1956		II		Musorgskiy	Volga Shipping Company, Gorky	delivered to Volga-Don Shipping Company, Rostov-on-Don
1956		II		Chaykovskiy	Volga Shipping Company, Gorky	out of service
1956		II		Mikhail Godenko	Yenissey Shipping Company, Krasnoyarsk	originally, the Borodin
1956		II		Rimskiy-Korsakov	Volga Shipping Company, Gorky	listed for sale in October 2011 again
1956		II		Ippolitov-Ivanov	Yenissey Shipping Company, Krasnoyarsk	out of service in 2005
1956		II		Peresvet	Yenissey Shipping Company, Krasnoyarsk	originally, the Anton Rubinshteyn, out of service in 1992, since 2004 hotelship Peresvet in Krasnoyarsk
1956		II		Kompozitor Glazunov	Volga Shipping Company, Gorky	
1956		II		Kompozitor Glinka	Volga Shipping Company, Gorky	out of service in 1995
1957		III		Kompozitor Kalinnikov	Yenissey Shipping Company, Krasnoyarsk	out of service, since 1997 hotelship Viktoria in Krasnoyarsk
1957		III		Kompozitor Prokofyev	Yenissey Shipping Company, Krasnoyarsk	out of service in Krasnoyarsk in 2005
1957		III	Image	Kompozitor Skryabin	Kama Shipping Company, Molotov	out of service, in Chshaykovskiy in Perm
1957		III		Kompozitor Alyabyev	Ob-Irtysch-Reederei, Omsk	out of service in 1999
1957		III		Kompozitor Balakirev	Ob-Irtysch-Reederei, Omsk	out of service
1957		III		Kapitan Rodin	Yenissey Shipping Company, Krasnoyarsk	originally, the Baykal, formerly: A. P. Chekhov; out of service in 2005
1958	31	III	Image of ship hull No.	M. Yu. Lermontov	Yenissey Shipping Company, Krasnoyarsk	
1958	343	III		Viktoria	Kama Shipping Company	originally, the A. S. Griboyedov, formerly: I. I. Shishkin; out of service
1958		III		Radyansykyy Soyus	Dnepr Shipping Company, Dnipropetrovsk	1986-1989 hotelship near Chernobyl; forgotten near Kiev
1958		III		T. G. Shevchenko	Dnepr Shipping Company, Dnepropetrovsk	originally, the V. I. Lenin, out of service in 1989 and sank later
1958		III	Image	Karl Marks	Dnepr Shipping Company, Kiev	hotelship near Chernobyl (1986–1989); out of service in 1989, forgotten near Kiev

== See also ==
- List of river cruise ships
- Valerian Kuybyshev-class motorship
- Dmitriy Furmanov-class motorship
- Baykal-class motorship
- Anton Chekhov-class motorship
- Sergey Yesenin-class motorship
- Oktyabrskaya Revolyutsiya-class motorship
- Ukraina-class motorship
- Dunay-class motorship
