= Sergey Yesenin-class motorship =

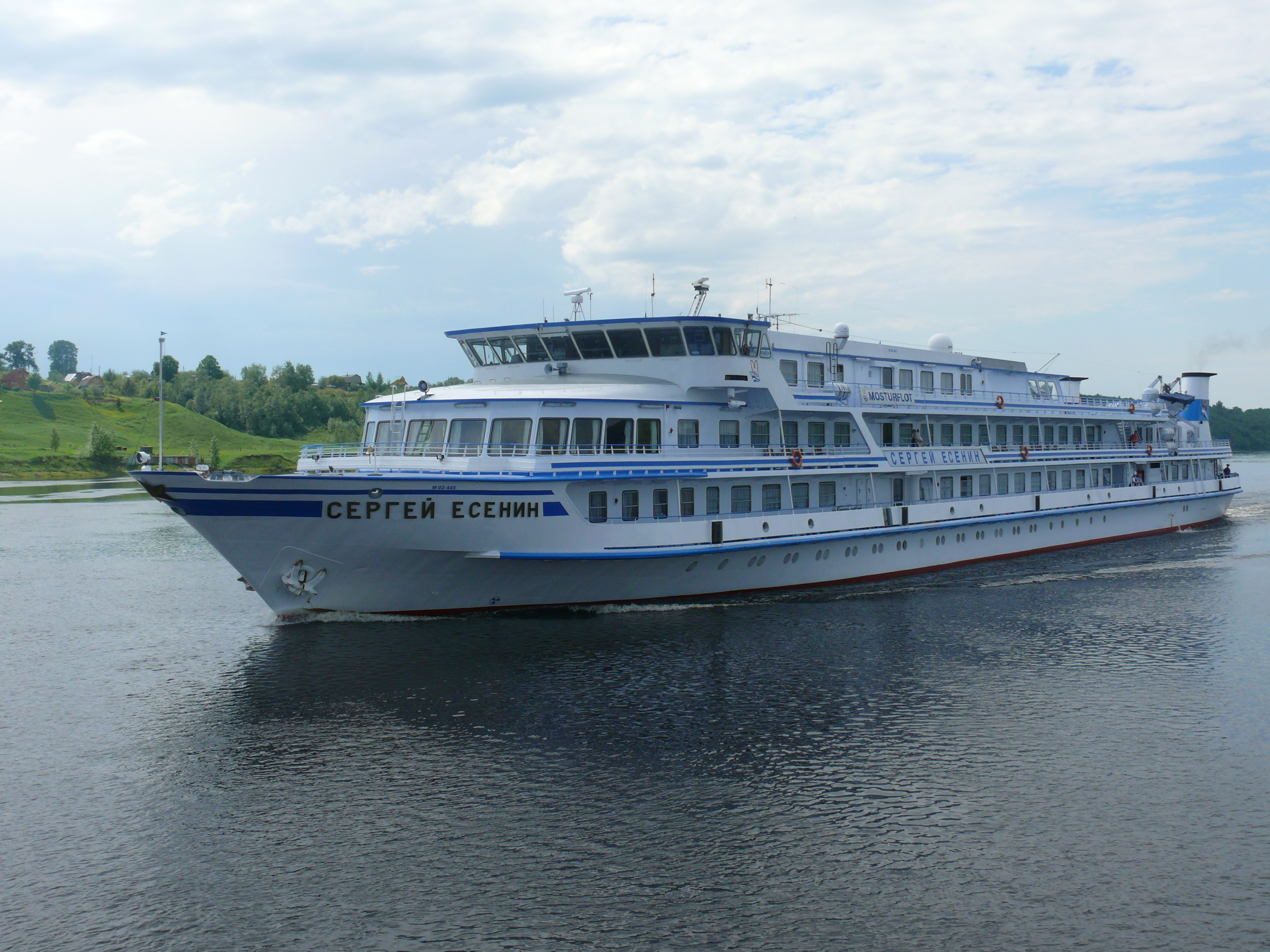
- River cruise ship Sergey Yesenin in Moscow

Class overview
- Builders: Österreichische Schiffswerften AG, Korneuburg, Austria
- Built: 1984–1986
- Planned: 5
- Building: 5
- Completed: 5
- Active: 5

General characteristics
- Tonnage: GT
- Displacement: 1,345 t
- Length: 90.4 m (297 ft)
- Beam: 15.0 m (49.2 ft)
- Draught: 1.63 m (5.3 ft)
- Decks: 3 passenger decks
- Installed power: 3 × 6VD18/15 AL-1 987 kilowatts (1,324 hp)
- Propulsion: 3
- Speed: 22.6 km/h (14.0 mph; 12.2 kn)
- Capacity: 180 passengers
- Crew: 55

Sergey Yesenin class is a class of Russian river passenger ships. It is named after Sergei Yesenin.

Three-deck cruise ships built in Austria, 1984–1986.

== River cruise ships of the Austrian project Q-065 ==
Sergey Yesenin-class motorships
No.	Original name	English transliteration
1	Сергей Есенин	Sergey Yesenin
2	Александр Блок (Александр Грин)	Aleksandr Blok (Aleksandr Grin)
3	Валерий Брюсов	Valeriy Bryusov
4	Демьян Бедный	Demyan Bednyy
5	Михаил Светлов	Mikhail Svetlov

== Overview ==
Sergey Yesenin (project Q-065) class motorships
Month and year of build	Hull No	Image	Name	Customer	Port of registry	Flag	Status
1984	K745		Sergey Yesenin	Moscow Shipping Company	Moscow	→	No. 216301 (RRR)
1984	K746		Aleksandr Grin	Moscow Shipping Company	Moscow	→	originally, the Aleksandr Blok, RRR 235702
1985	K747		Valeriy Bryusov	Moscow Shipping Company	Moscow	→	No. 216303 (RRR)
1985	K750		Demyan Bednyy	Lena Shipping Company	Yakutsk → Zhatay	→	No. 216304 (RRR)
1986	K751		Mikhail Svetlov	Lena Shipping Company	Yakutsk	→	No. 216305 (RRR)

== See also ==
- List of river cruise ships
- Valerian Kuybyshev-class motorship
- Rossiya class (project 785) motorship
- Rossiya class (project 1877) motorship
- Anton Chekhov-class motorship
- Vladimir Ilyich-class motorship
- Rodina-class motorship
- Baykal-class motorship
- Dmitriy Furmanov-class motorship
- Maksim Gorkiy-class motorship
