= Baykal-class motorship =

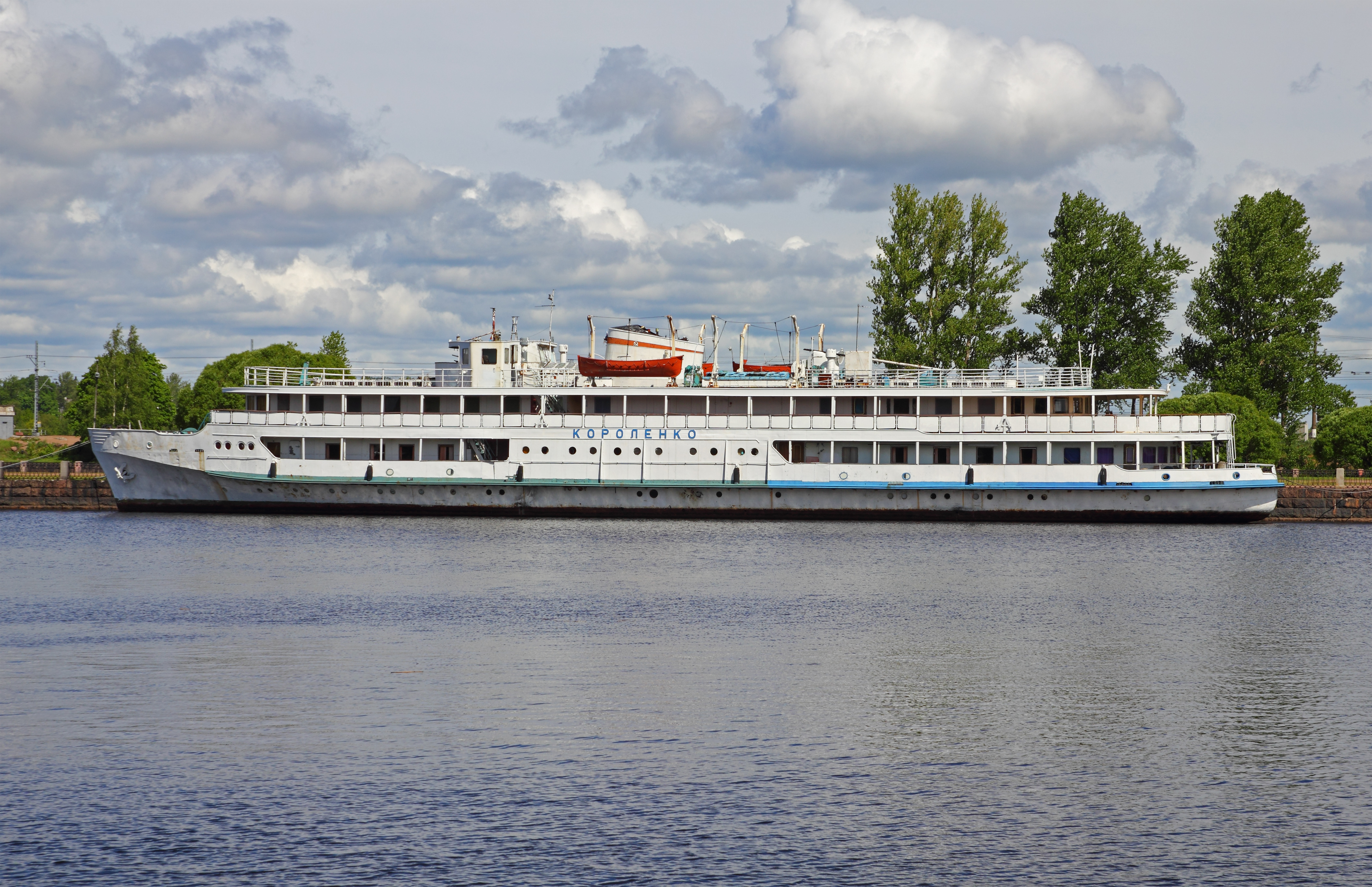
- River cruise ship Korolenko as hotel in Vyborg

Class overview
- Builders: VEB Warnowwerft Warnemünde, Warnemünde, East Germany
- Built: 1953-1956
- Planned: 15
- Completed: 15
- Active: 3

General characteristics
- Tonnage: 1,091 GT
- Displacement: 774 t
- Length: 65.2 m (214 ft)
- Beam: 12 m (39 ft)
- Draught: 2.22 m (7.3 ft)
- Decks: 2 passenger decks
- Installed power: 2 × 6NVD48 588 kilowatts (789 hp)
- Propulsion: 2
- Speed: 25.5 km/h (15.8 mph; 13.8 kn)
- Capacity: 197 passengers
- Crew: 40

Baykal class is a class of Russian river passenger ships. It is named after Baikal.

Two-deck cargo-passenger ships were built by VEB Warnowwerft Warnemünde, at their shipyard in Warnemünde, in East Germany in 1953–1956.

== River cruise ships of the project 646 ==
Baykal-class motorships
No.	Original name	English transliteration
1	Байкал (Академик Киренский)	Baykal (Akademik Kirenskiy)
2	Иссык-Куль (40 лет ВЛКСМ, Капитан Пономарев)	Issyk-Kul (40 let VLKSM, Kapitan Ponomarev)
3	Балхаш (Профессор Близняк, Близняк)	Balkhash (Professor Bliznyak, Bliznyak)
4	Онега	Onega
5	Севан (Герой Ю. Гагарин, Господин Великий Новгород)	Sevan (Geroy Yu. Gagarin, Gospodin Velikiy Novgorod)
6	Ладога (Ladoga)	Ladoga (Ladoga)
7	Короленко	Korolenko
8	Ленинский Комсомол	Leninskiy Komsomol
9	Белинский	Belinskiy
10	Радищев (Красногвардеец, Сергей Орлов)	Radishchev (Krasnogvardeets, Sergey Orlov)
11	Чернышевский	Chernyshevskiy
12	Механик Кулибин	Mekhanik Kulibin
13	Механик Калашников	Mekhanik Kalashnikov
14	Сергеев-Ценский (Родина)	Sergeev-Tsenskiy (Rodina)
15	Мамин-Сибиряк	Mamin-Sibiryak

== See also ==
- Rossiya-class motorship (1952)
- Rossiya-class motorship (1973)
- Dmitriy Furmanov-class motorship
- Valerian Kuybyshev-class motorship
- Rodina-class motorship
- Anton Chekhov-class motorship
- Maksim Gorkiy-class motorship
- Sergey Yesenin-class motorship
- Oktyabrskaya Revolyutsiya-class motorship
- Yerofey Khabarov-class motorship
