= Anton Chekhov-class motorship =

Class of Russian river passenger ships

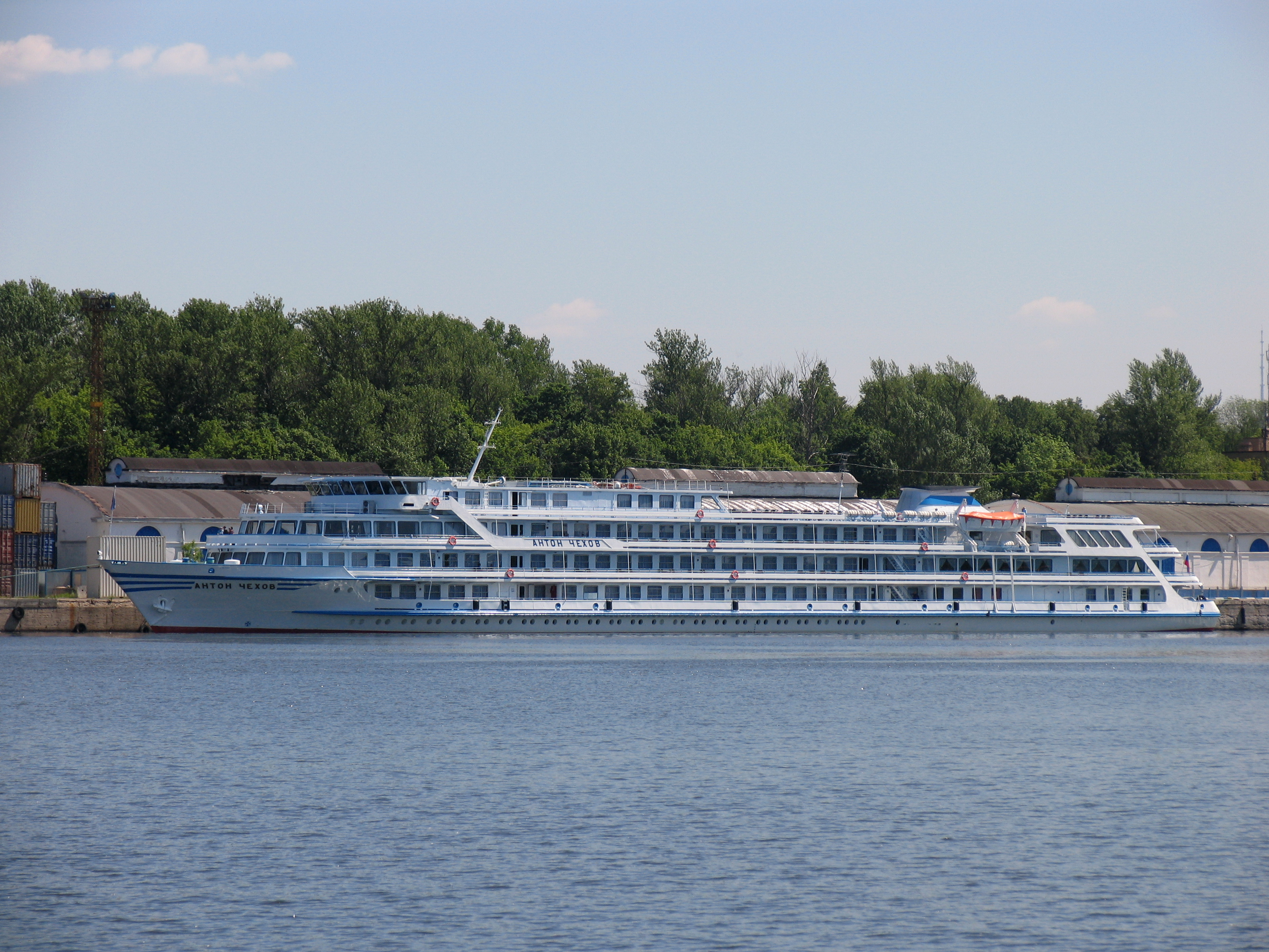
- Cruise ship Anton Chekhov in Moscow

Class overview
- Builders: Österreichische Schiffswerften AG, Korneuburg, Austria
- Built: 1978-1979
- Planned: 2
- Building: 2
- Completed: 2
- Active: 2

General characteristics
- Tonnage: GT
- Displacement: 2,920 t
- Length: 115.63 m (379.4 ft)
- Beam: 16.46 m (54.0 ft)
- Draught: 2.8 m (9.2 ft)
- Decks: 4 passenger decks
- Installed power: 3 × 6ChRN 36/45 EG-60 1,987 kilowatts (2,665 hp)
- Propulsion: 3
- Speed: 25.5 km/h (15.8 mph; 13.8 kn)
- Capacity: 250 passengers
- Crew: 75

Anton Chekhov-class motorship is a class of Russian river passenger ships. It is named after Anton Chekhov.

Four-deck cruise ships manufactured in Austria, 1978–1979.

== River cruise ships of the Austrian project Q-056 ==
Anton Chekhov-class motorships
No.	Original name	English transliteration
1	Антон Чехов	Anton Chekhov
2	Лев Толстой	Lev Tolstoy

== Overview ==
Anton Chekhov-class motorships
Month and year of build	Hull No	Image	Name	Operator	Port of Registry	Flag	Status
June 1978	K713		Anton Chekhov	Doninturflot	Krasnoyarsk → Rostov-on-Don	→	No. 034941 (RRR)
May 1979	K714		Lev Tolstoy	Vodohod	Gorky → Nizhny Novgorod	→	No. 034942 (RRR)

== See also ==
- Rossiya-class motorship (1952)
- Rossiya-class motorship (1973)
- Dmitriy Furmanov-class motorship
- Valerian Kuybyshev-class motorship
- Rodina-class motorship
- Baykal-class motorship
- Maksim Gorkiy-class motorship
