= A-Rosa Cruises =

River cruise line in Rostock, Germany

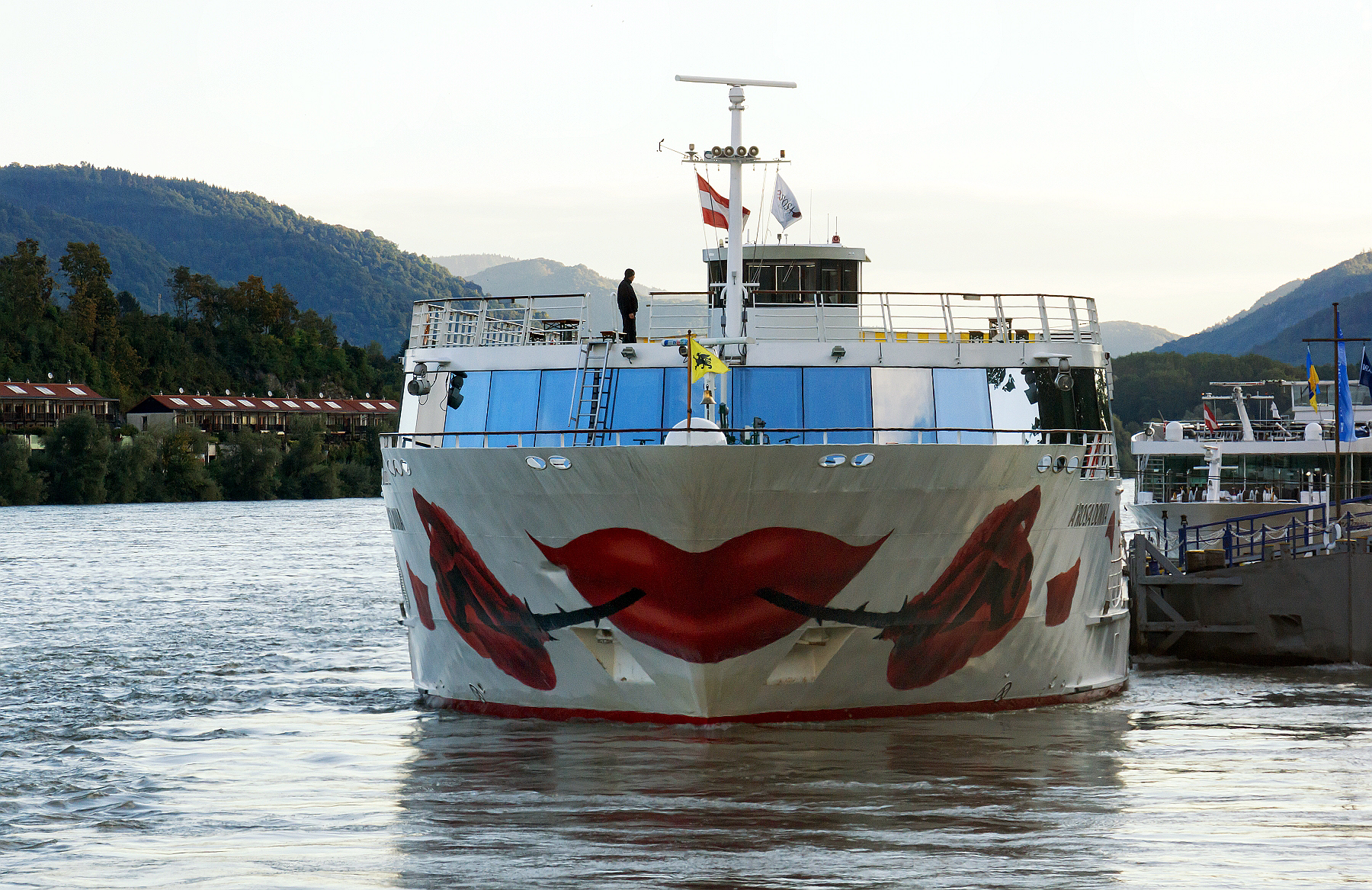
- Company type: GmbH
- Industry: Transportation
- Founded: 2001
- Founder: P&O Princess Cruises
- Fate: Sold by Carnival Corporation & plc, 2003
- Headquarters: Rostock, Germany
- Area served: Germany
- Services: River cruises
- Website: www.arosa-cruises.com

A-Rosa Cruises is a cruise line based in Rostock, Germany, which operates river cruises in Germany.

== History ==
A-Rosa was established in 2001 as A'Rosa, a subsidiary of P&O Princess Cruises. The company was created to serve the German cruise market alongside the AIDA Cruises fleet, which P&O had acquired in 1999. A'Rosa was loosely modelled on the AIDA concept and initially operated three ships.

A'Rosa Blu was the sole ocean-going cruise ship in the fleet, accompanied by A'Rosa Bella and A'Rosa Donna, two newly built river cruise ships.

In 2003, P&O Princess merged with Carnival Corporation to form Carnival Corporation & plc. The A'Rosa brand was sold shortly after the merger and was acquired by a private company that owned A-ROSA Flussschiff. The company continues to operate river cruises on the Danube, Main, Mosel, Rhine, Rhône and Saône rivers.

== A-Rosa Cruises fleet ==
=== Current fleet ===
Built	Ship	Builder	Entered service for A'Rosa Cruises	Gross Tonnage	Image
2002	A-Rosa Bella	Neptun Werft	2002–present	3,524 tons	
2002	A-Rosa Donna	Neptun Werft	2002–present	3,524 tons	
2003	A-Rosa Mia	Neptun Werft	2003–present	3,524 tons	
2004	A-Rosa Riva	Neptun Werft	2004–present	3,524 tons	
2004	A-Rosa Luna	Neptun Werft	2005–present	3,524 tons	
2005	A-Rosa Stella	Neptun Werft	2005–present	3,524 tons	
2008	A-Rosa Aqua	Neptun Werft	2009–present	3,524 tons	
2010	A-Rosa Viva	Neptun Werft	2010–present	3,524 tons	
2011	A-Rosa Brava	Neptun Werft	2011–present	3,524 tons	
2011	A-Rosa Silva	Neptun Werft	2012–present	3,524 tons	
2013	A-Rosa Flora	Neptun Werft	2014–present	3,524 tons	

=== Former Fleet ===
Built	Ship	Builder	Entered service for A'Rosa Cruises	Gross tonnage	Notes	Image
1991	A'Rosa Blu	Fincantieri	2002–2004	69,845 tons	Sold for scrap in 2020.	
