= A-Rosa Silva =

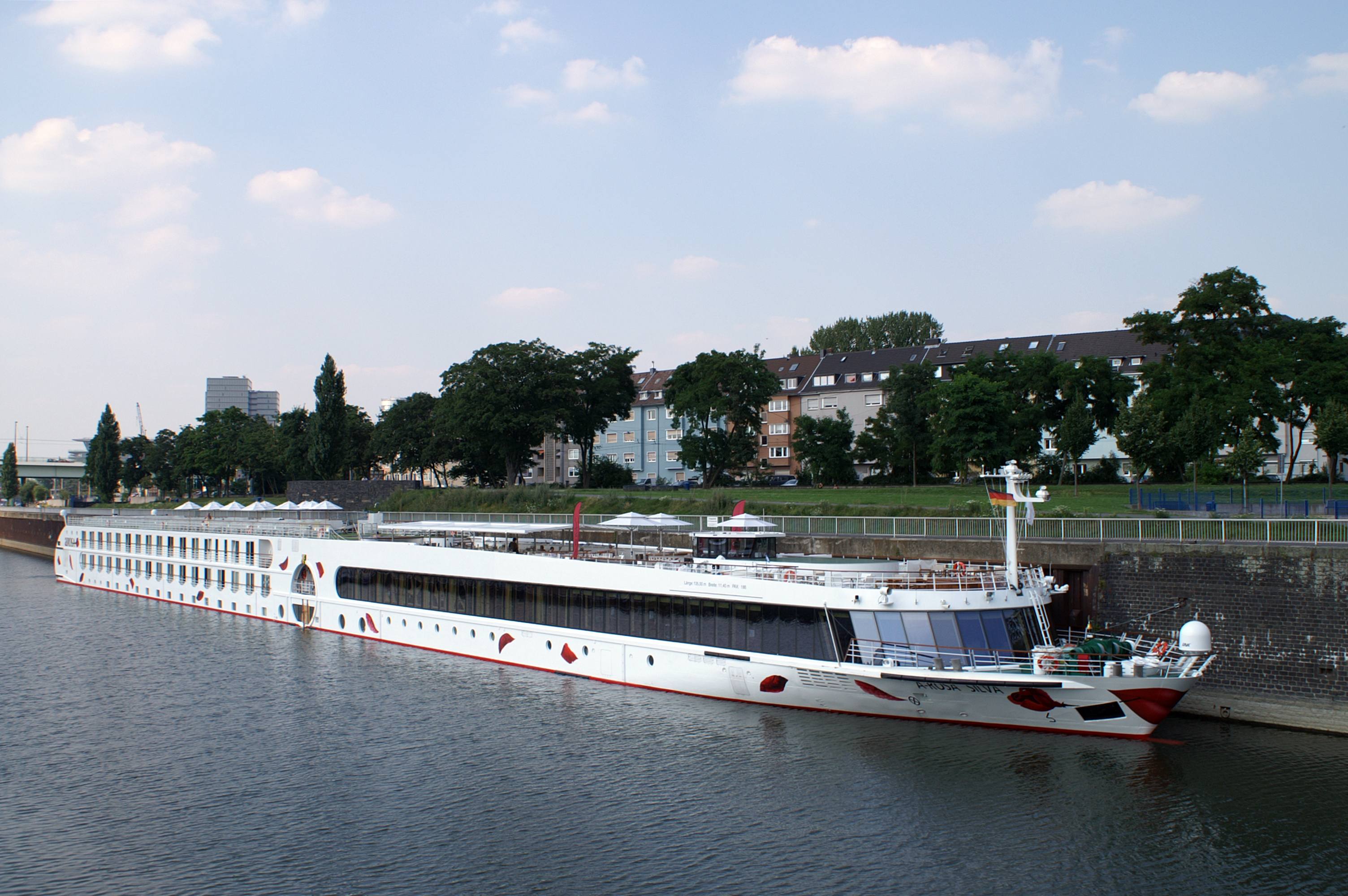
- A-Rosa Silva on the Rhine in Cologne

History

Germany
- Name: A-Rosa Silva
- Owner: 2012–2014: A-ROSA Flussschiff
- Operator: A-ROSA Flussschiff
- Port of registry: Rostock, Germany
- Route: Frankfurt – Strasbourg, Nuremberg – Regensburg
- Builder: Neptun Werft, Warnemünde, Germany
- Yard number: S.519
- Laid down: 4 November 2011
- Christened: 2 July 2012
- Maiden voyage: 3 July 2012
- In service: 3 July 2012
- Identification: Call sign: DD7467; MMSI number: 211572460; ENI number: 04810230
- Status: in service

General characteristics
- Class & type: River cruise ship
- Displacement: 1,824 t
- Length: 135.0 m (442.9 ft)
- Beam: 11.4 m (37 ft)
- Draught: 2.0 m (6.6 ft)
- Decks: 2,5
- Installed power: 4 × Volvo Penta D12-450MH; 1,324 kilowatts (1,776 hp)
- Propulsion: 4 propellers (Z-drive)
- Speed: 22 km/h (14 mph; 12 kn)
- Capacity: 186 passengers (89 cabins)
- Crew: 50

A-Rosa Silva is a German river cruise ship, cruising in the Rhine – Main – Danube basin. It was built by Neptun Werft GmbH at their shipyard in Warnemünde, Germany, and entered service in 2012. Her sister ship is A-Rosa Flora. Her home port is currently Rostock.

== Features ==
The ship has two restaurants, two lounges and bar, big-chess, Finnish sauna, steam sauna and resting area.

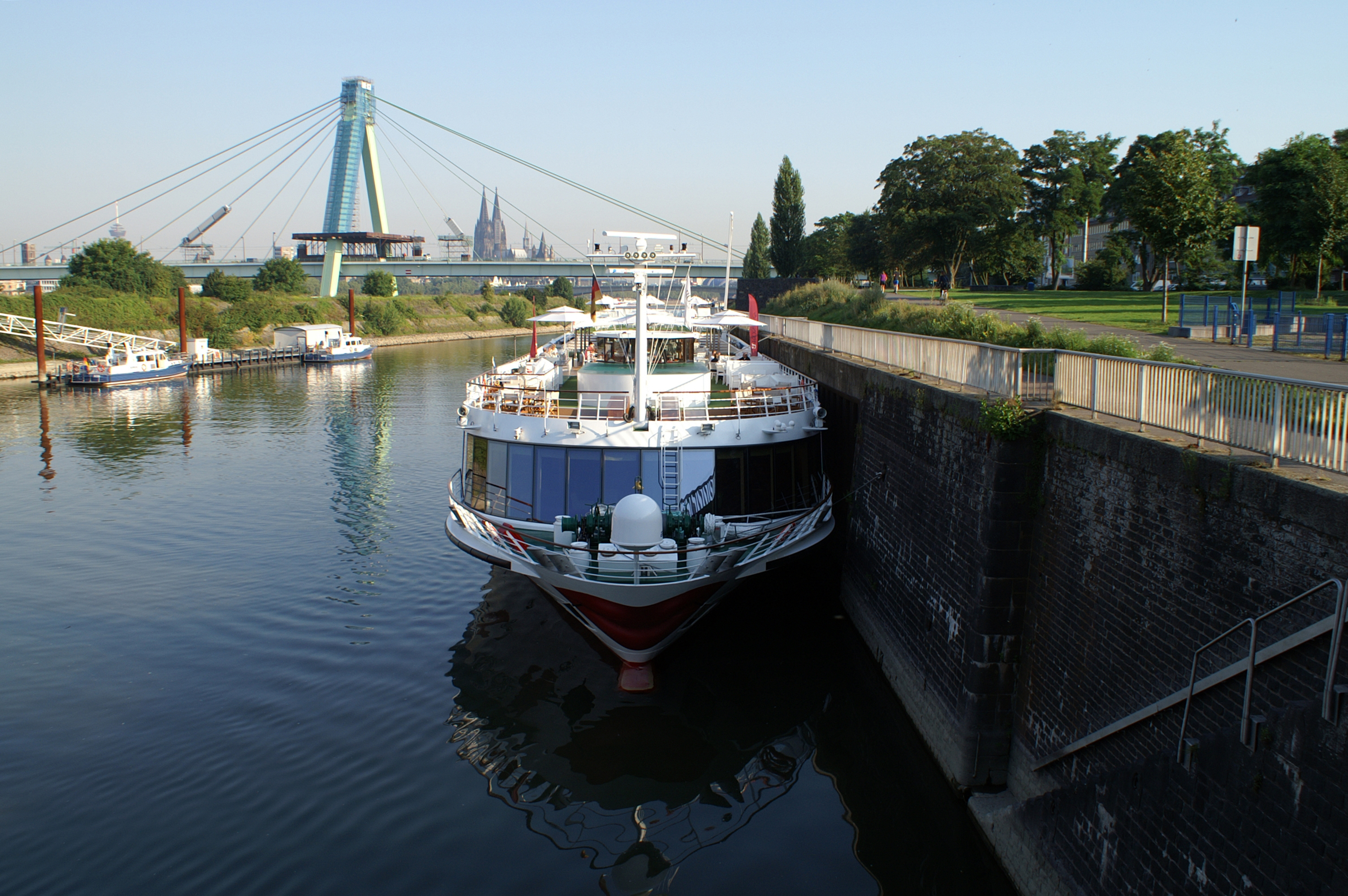
A-Rosa Silva in Cologne

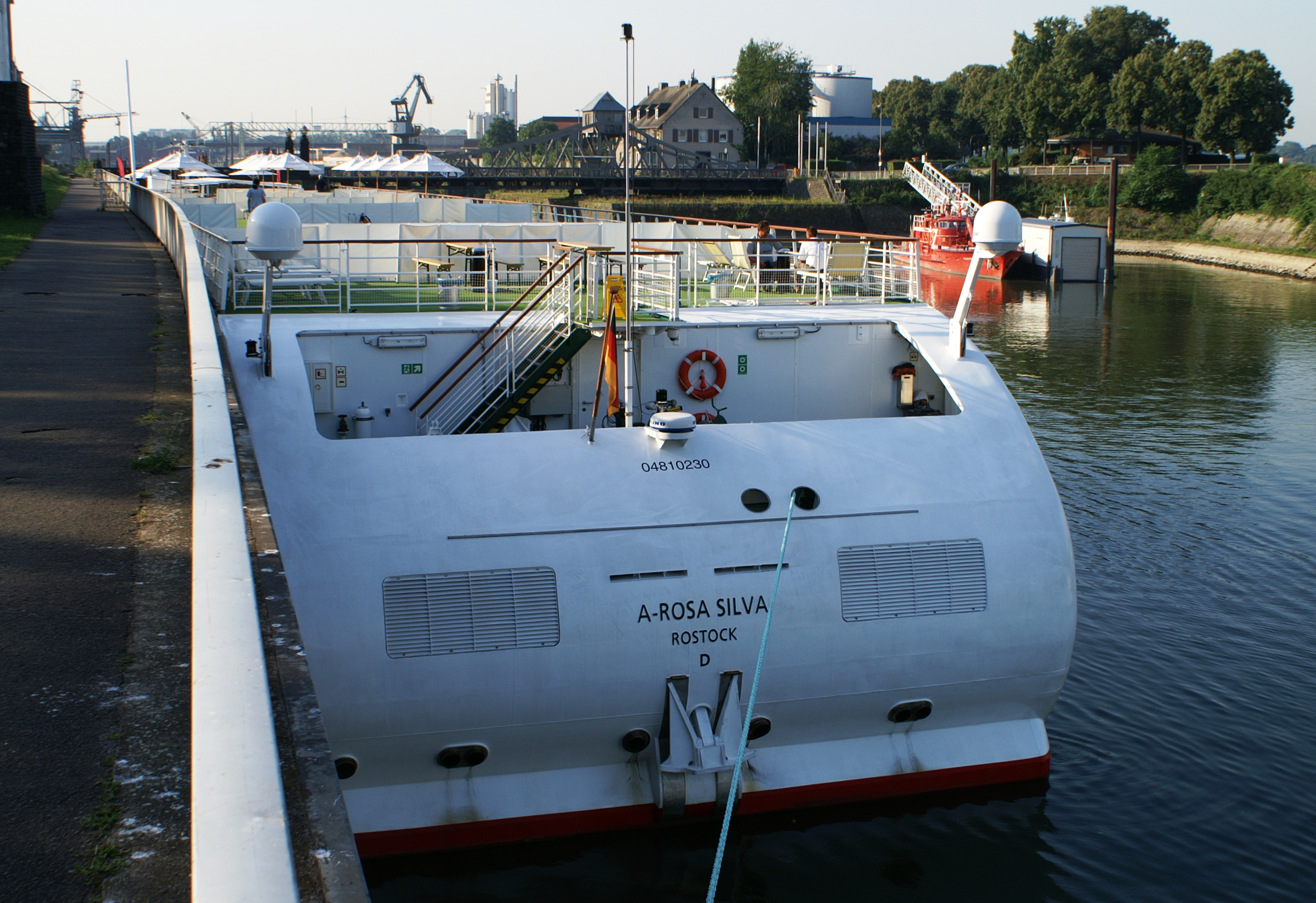
A-Rosa Silva on the Rhine

== See also ==
- List of river cruise ships
