= A-Rosa Riva =

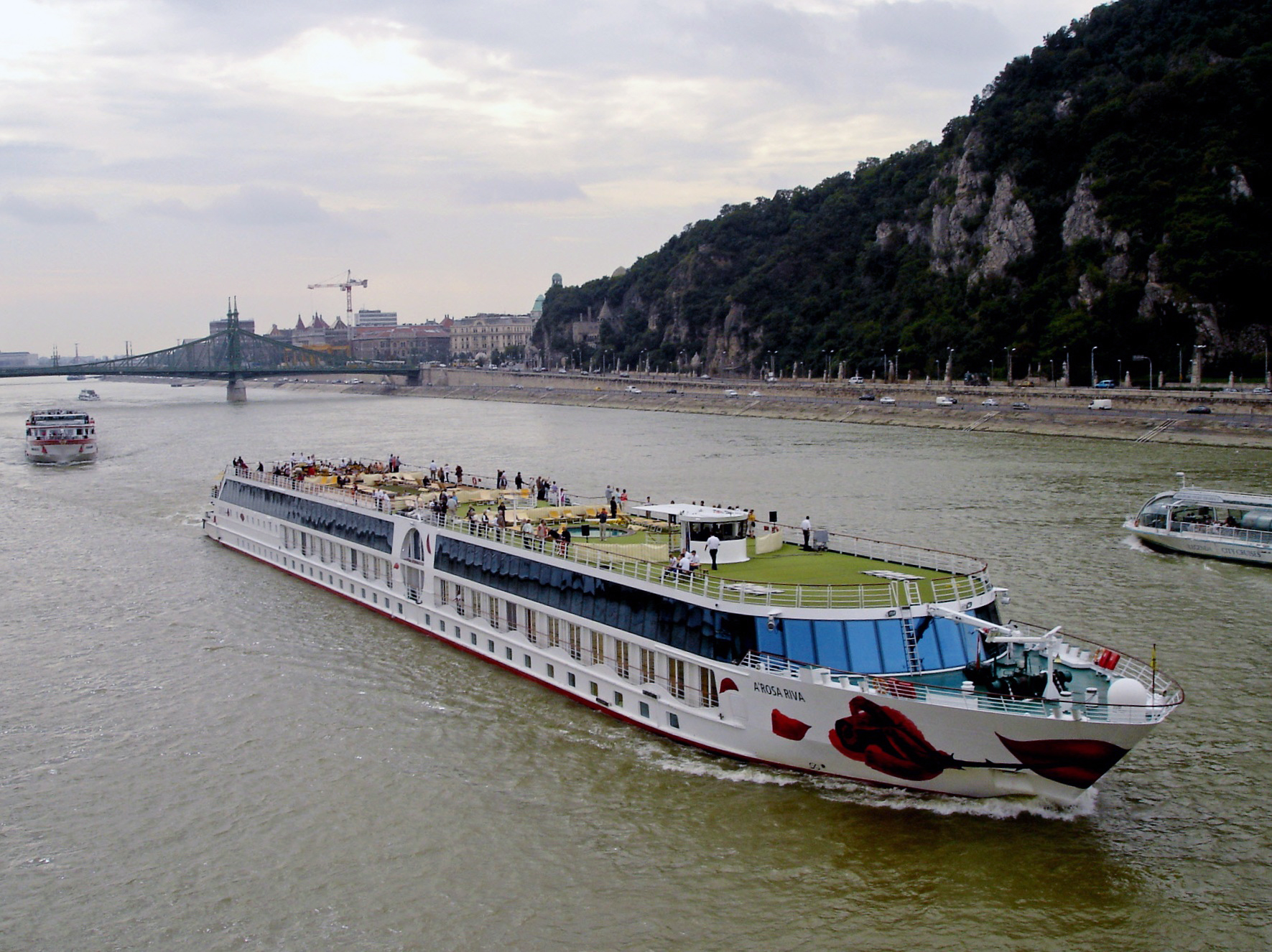
- A-Rosa Riva on the Danube in Budapest

History

Germany
- Name: A-Rosa Riva
- Owner: 2004–2012: A-ROSA Flussschiff
- Operator: A-ROSA Flussschiff
- Port of registry: Rostock, Germany
- Route: Passau – Vylkove
- Builder: Neptun Werft, Warnemünde, Germany
- Yard number: S.504
- Christened: 9 April 2004
- Completed: March 2004
- Maiden voyage: 9 April 2004
- In service: 9 April 2004
- Identification: Call sign: DA4157; IMO number: 8979295; MMSI number: 211160710; ENI number: 04802780
- Status: in service

General characteristics
- Class & type: River cruise ship
- Tonnage: 3,524 GT
- Displacement: 1,850 t
- Length: 124.50 m (408 ft 6 in)
- Beam: 14.4 m (47 ft 3 in)
- Draught: 1.87 m (6 ft 2 in)
- Decks: 4
- Installed power: 2 × MTU 16V 2000 M60; 1,600 kilowatts (2,100 hp)
- Propulsion: 2 propellers (Z-drive) STP 500 1 × Schottel-Pump Jet-SPJ 57
- Speed: 24 km/h (15 mph; 13 kn)
- Capacity: 242 passengers (100 cabins)
- Crew: 50

A-Rosa Riva (registered ship name: A'Rosa Riva) is a German river cruise ship, cruising on the Danube river. The ship was built by Neptun Werft GmbH at their shipyard in Warnemünde, Germany, and entered service in April 2004. Her sister ships are A-Rosa Bella, A-Rosa Donna and A-Rosa Mia. Her home port is currently Rostock.

== Features ==
The ship has two restaurants, two lounges and two bars, Finnish sauna, biosauna and resting area.

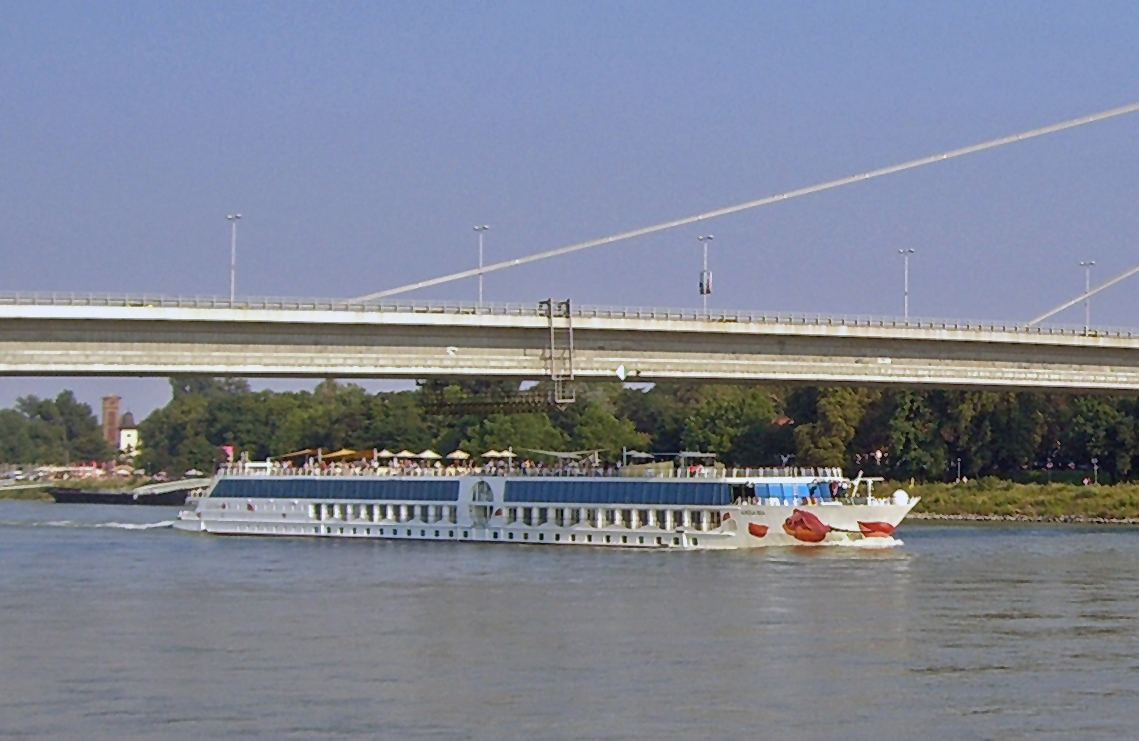
A-Rosa Riva underway

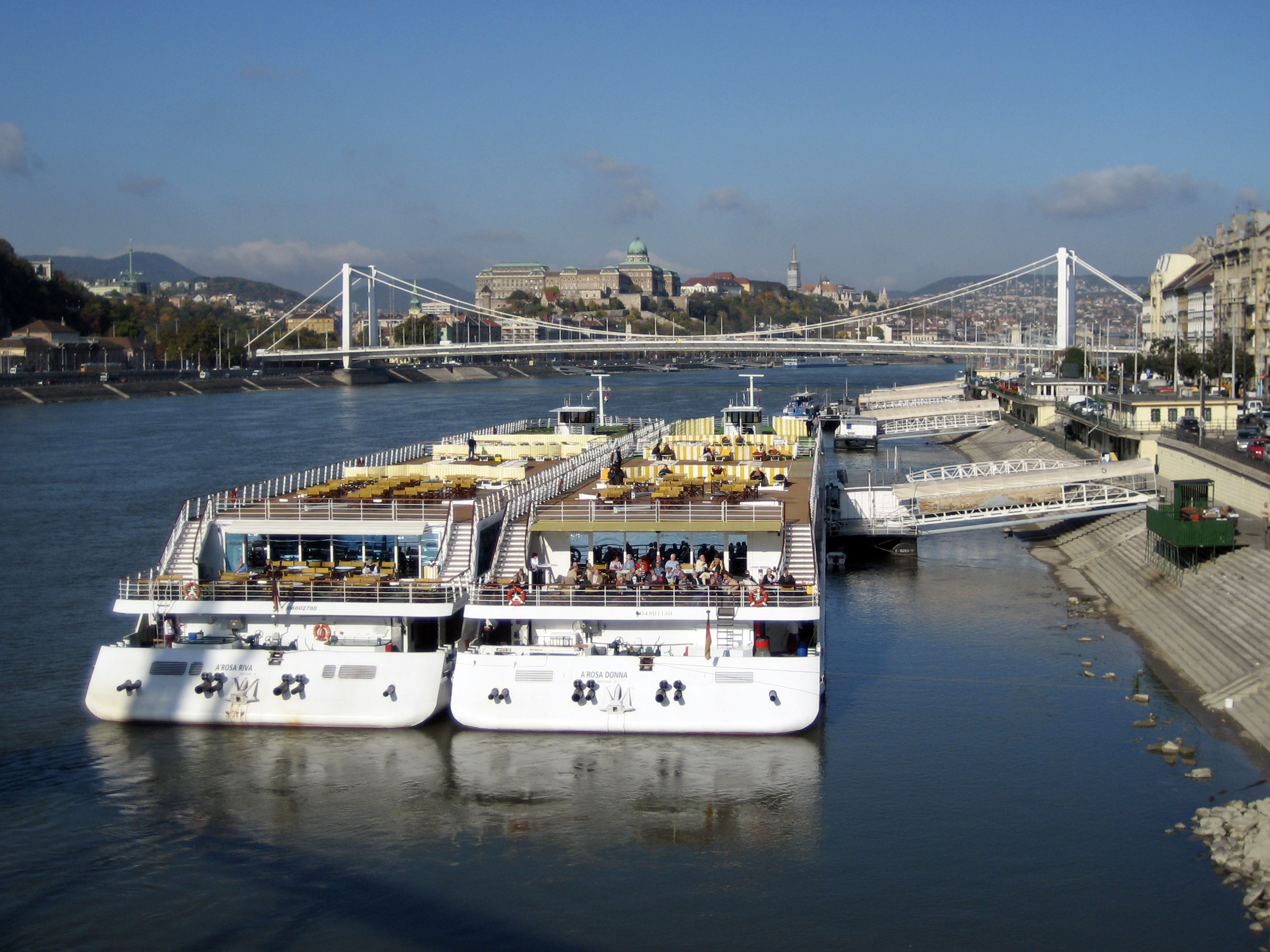
River cruise ships
A-Rosa Riva and A-Rosa Donna

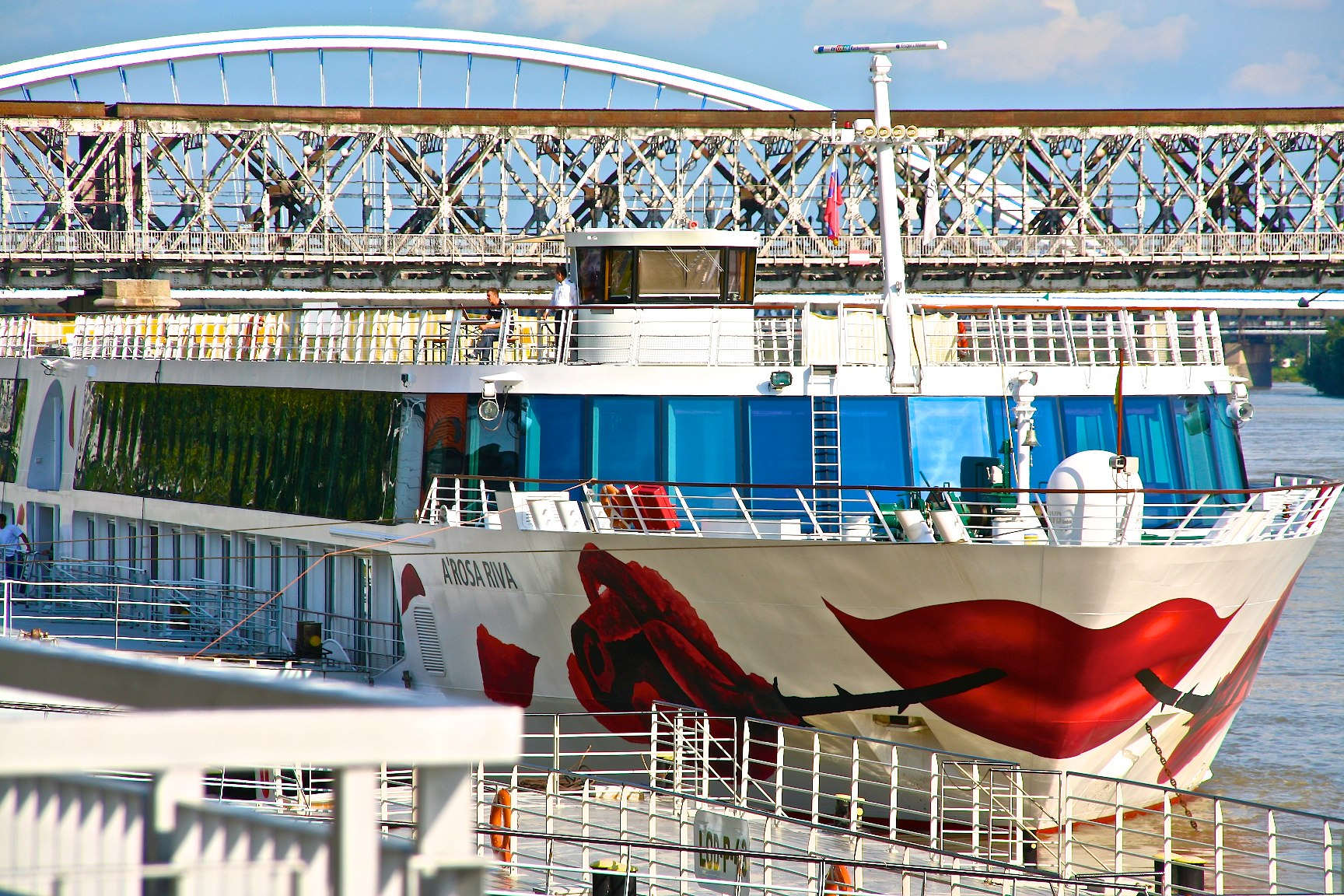
A-Rosa Riva at pier

== See also ==
- List of river cruise ships
