= A-Rosa Flora =

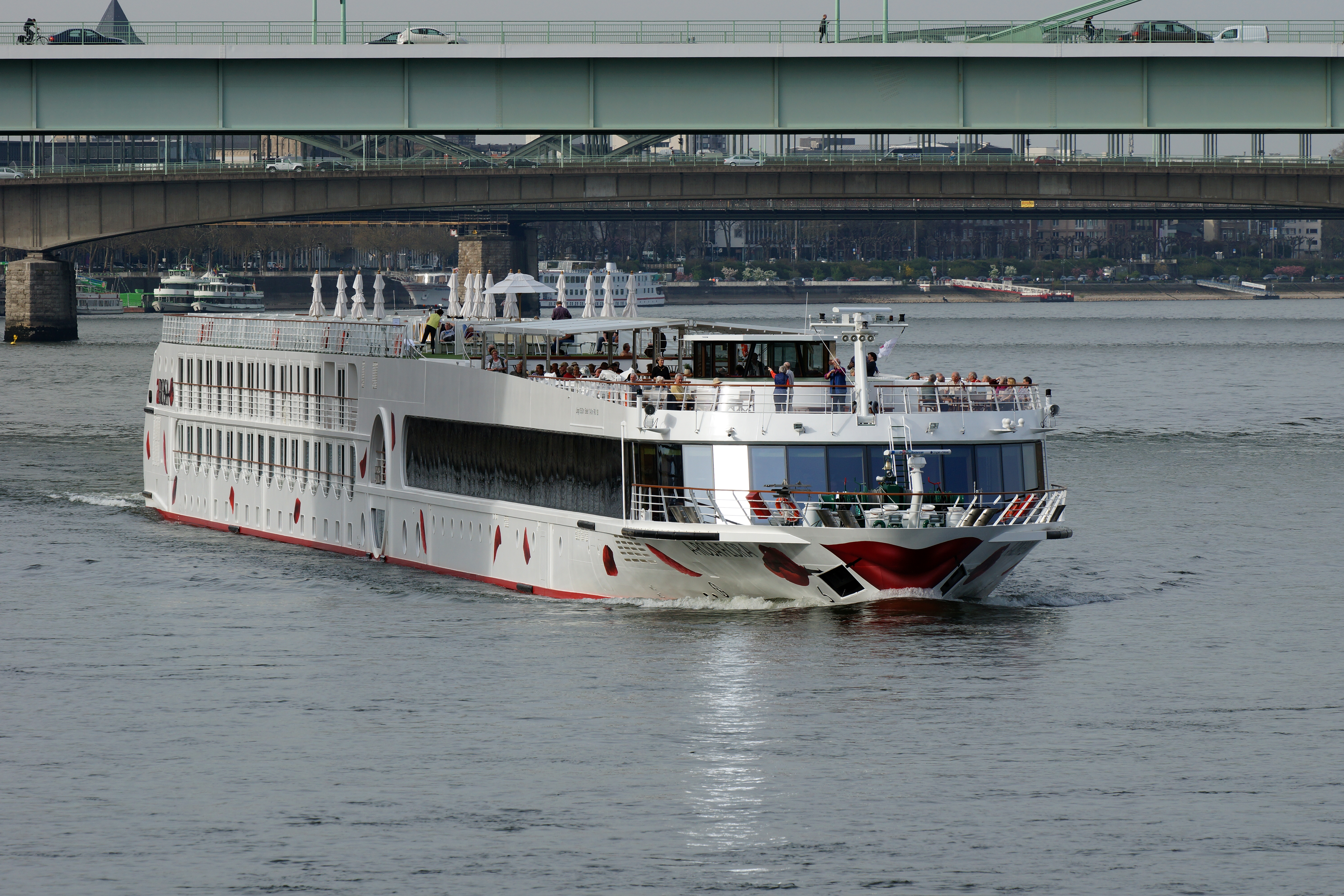
- A-Rosa Flora on the Rhine in Cologne

History

Germany
- Name: A-Rosa Flora
- Owner: 2014–2014: A-ROSA Flussschiff
- Operator: A-ROSA Flussschiff
- Port of registry: Rostock, Germany
- Route: Cologne – Amsterdam, Cologne – Rotterdam, Cologne – Mainz, Cologne – Koblenz
- Ordered: 14 February 2011
- Builder: Neptun Werft, Warnemünde, Germany
- Yard number: S. 520
- Laid down: 12 April 2013
- Christened: 3 April 2014
- Acquired: 13 March 2014
- Maiden voyage: 5 April 2014
- In service: 5 April 2014
- Identification: Call sign: DMBD; MMSI number: 211621310; ENI number: 04810970
- Status: In service

General characteristics
- Class & type: River cruise ship
- Tonnage: 3,524 GT
- Displacement: 1,824 t
- Length: 135.0 m (442.9 ft)
- Beam: 11.4 m (37 ft)
- Decks: 4
- Installed power: 4 × Volvo Penta D12-450MH; 1,324 kilowatts (1,776 hp)
- Propulsion: 4 propellers (Z-drive)
- Speed: 22 km/h (14 mph; 12 kn)
- Capacity: 183 passengers (83 cabins)
- Crew: 50

A-Rosa Flora is a German river cruise ship, cruising in the Rhine – Main – Danube basin. It was built by Neptun Werft GmbH at their shipyard in Warnemünde, Germany, and entered service in 2014. Her sister ship is A-Rosa Silva. Her home port is currently Rostock.

== Features ==
The ship has two restaurants, two lounges and bar, big-chess, Finnish sauna, steam sauna and resting area.

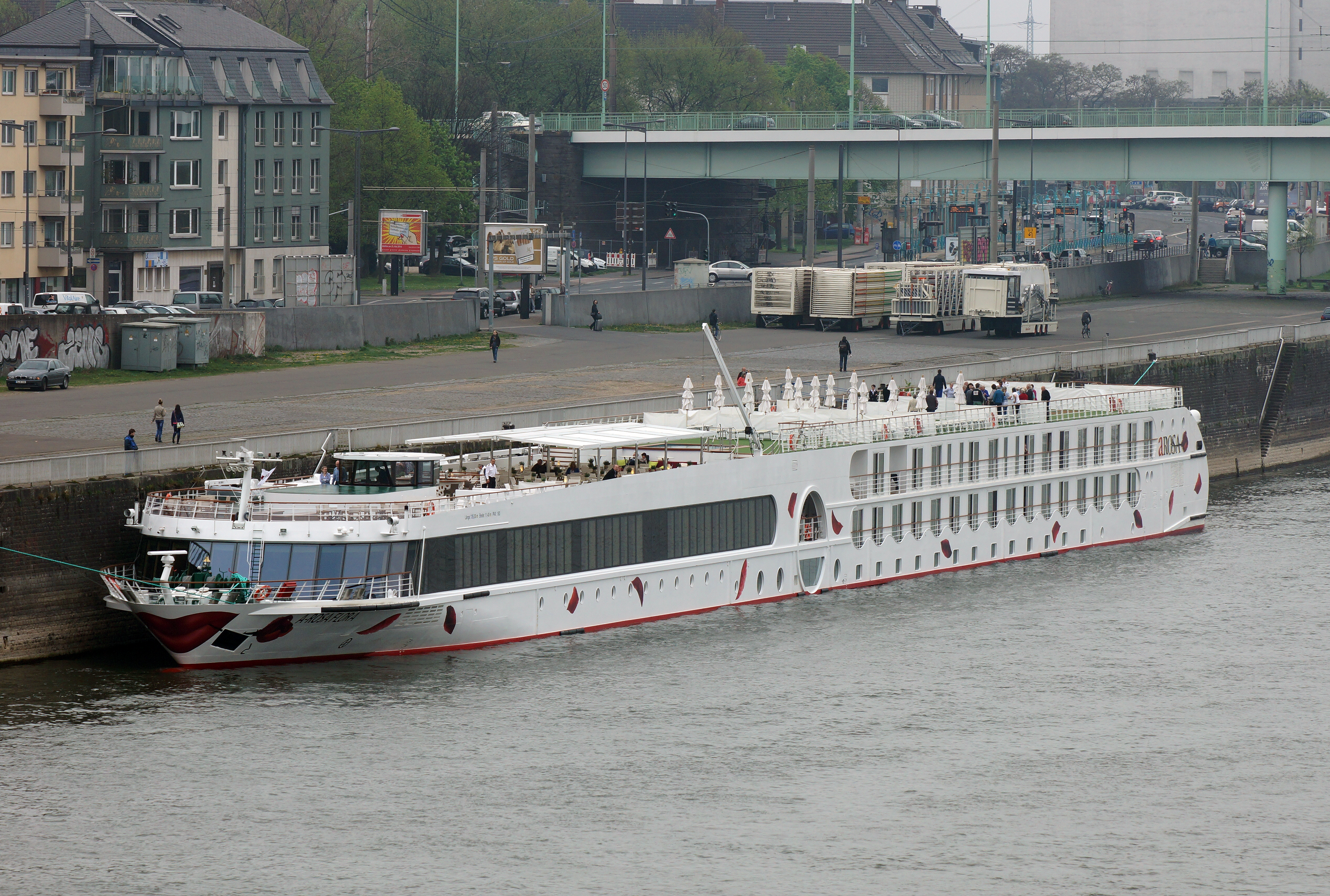
A-Rosa Flora at quay in Cologne-Deutz

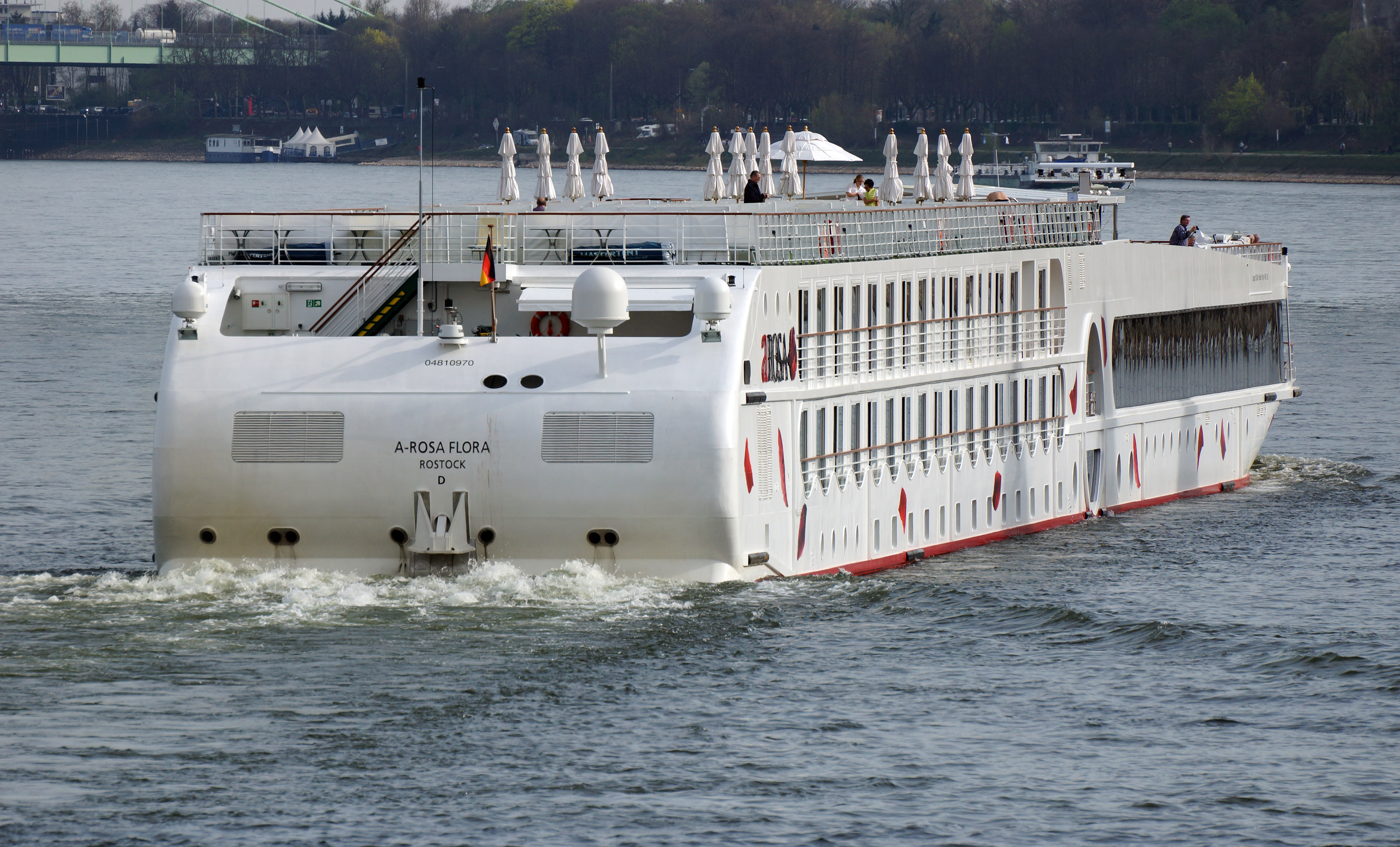
A-Rosa Flora on the Rhine

== See also ==
- List of river cruise ships
