= A-Rosa Stella =

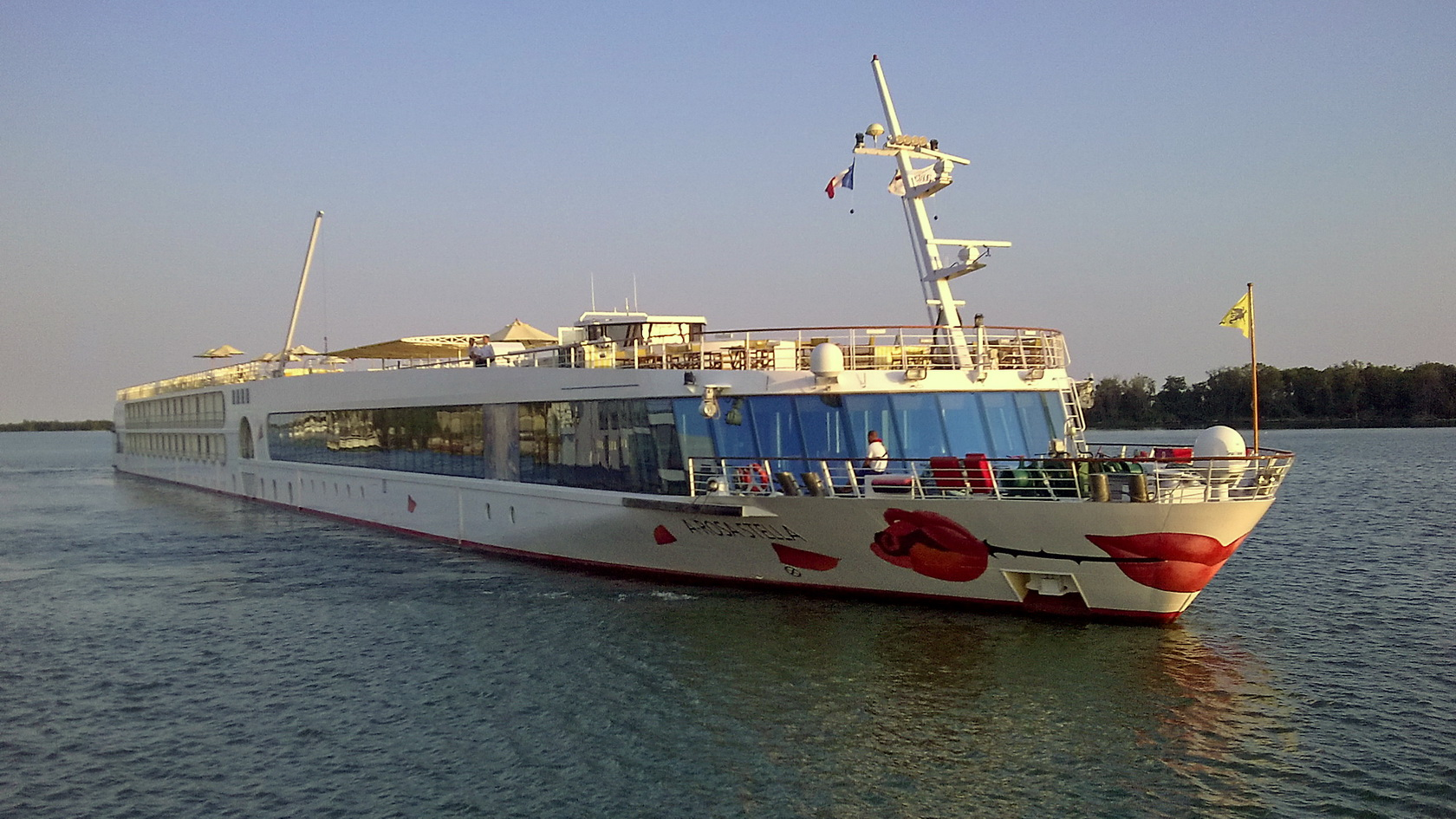
- A-Rosa Stella on the Rhone

History

Germany
- Name: A-Rosa Stella
- Owner: 2005–2012: A-ROSA Flussschiff
- Operator: A-ROSA Flussschiff
- Port of registry: Rostock, Germany
- Route: Lyon – Avignon
- Builder: Neptun Werft, Warnemünde, Germany
- Yard number: S.512
- In service: 2005
- Identification: Call sign: DF2446; MMSI number: 211587790; ENI number: 04803530
- Status: in service

General characteristics
- Class & type: River cruise ship
- Tonnage: 3,524 GT
- Displacement: 1,850 t
- Length: 125.80 m (412.7 ft)
- Beam: 11.4 m (37 ft)
- Draught: 1.6 m (5.2 ft)
- Decks: 4
- Installed power: 2 × MTU 16V 2000 M60; 1,600 kilowatts (2,100 hp)
- Propulsion: 2 Schottel twin propellers (Z-drive) STP 500; 1 × Schottel Pump Jet-SPJ 57
- Speed: 24 km/h (15 mph; 13 kn)
- Capacity: 174 passengers
- Crew: 45

The A-Rosa Stella is a German river cruise ship, cruising in the Rhone – Saône basin. The ship was built by Neptun Werft GmbH at their shipyard in Warnemünde, Germany, and entered service in 2005. Her sister ship is A-Rosa Luna. Her home port is currently Rostock.

== Features ==
The ship has restaurant, two lounges and bar, big-chess, Finnish sauna, steam sauna and resting area.

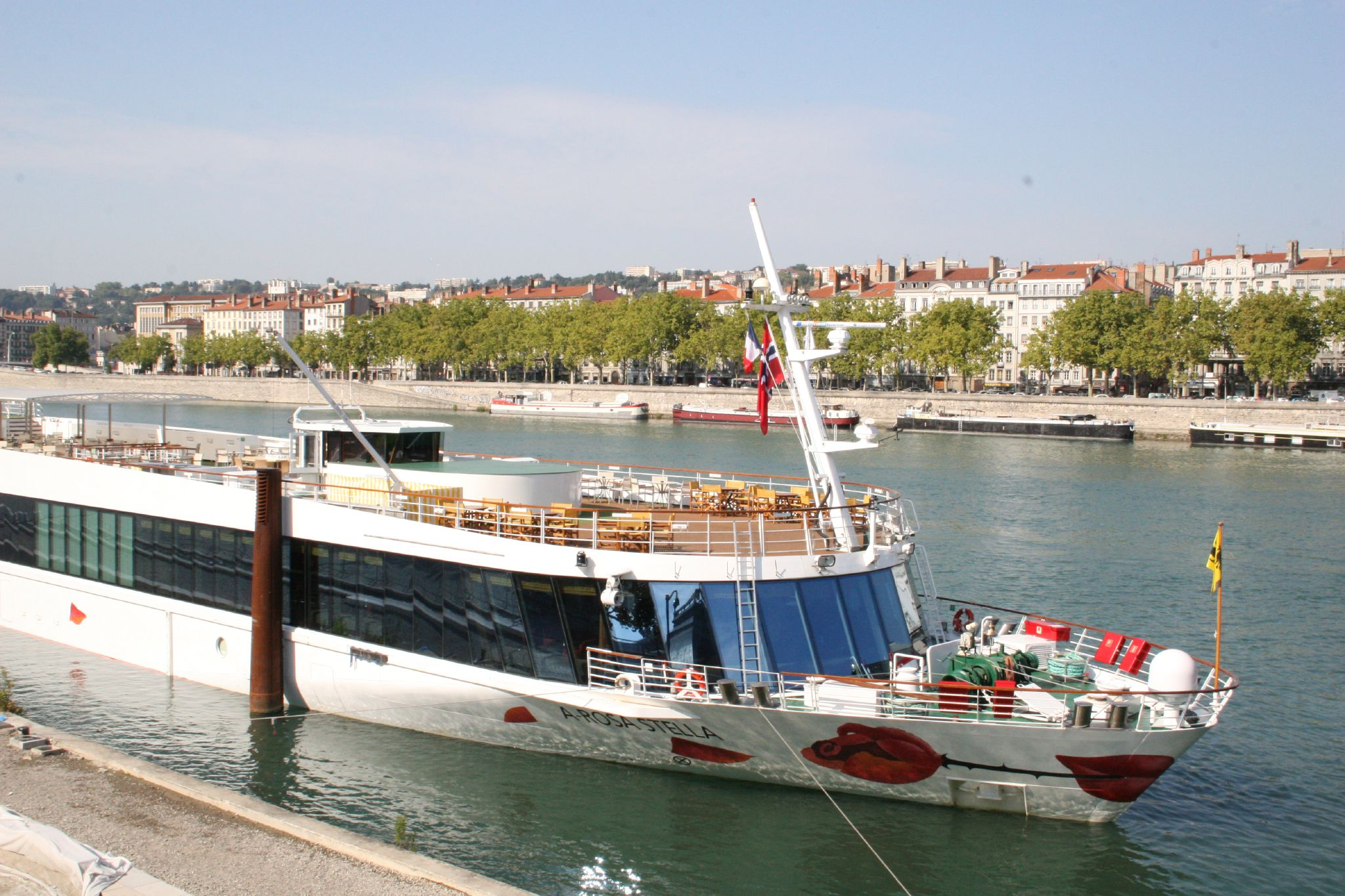
A-Rosa Stella on the Rhone

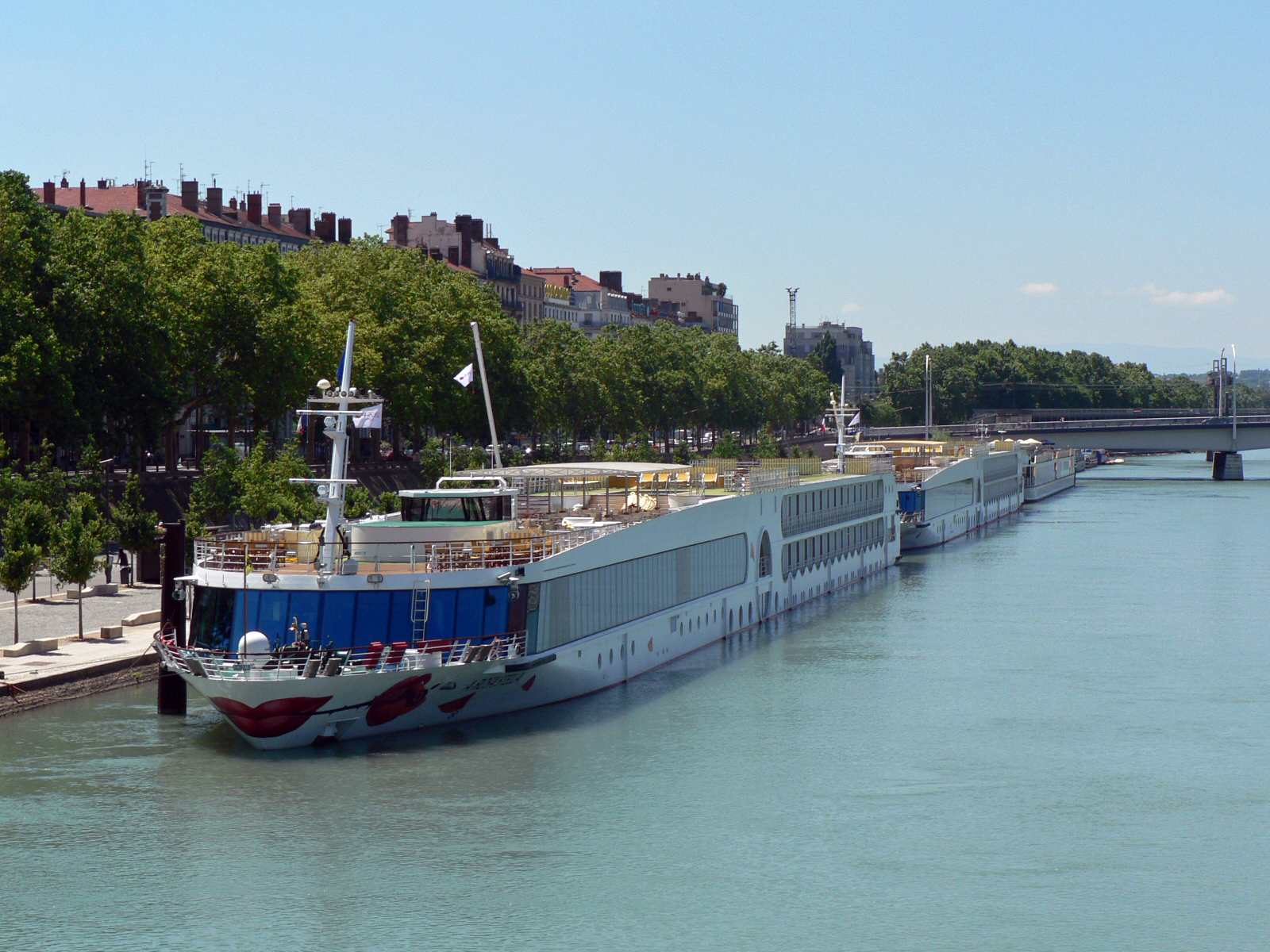
River cruise ships on the Rhone in Lyon

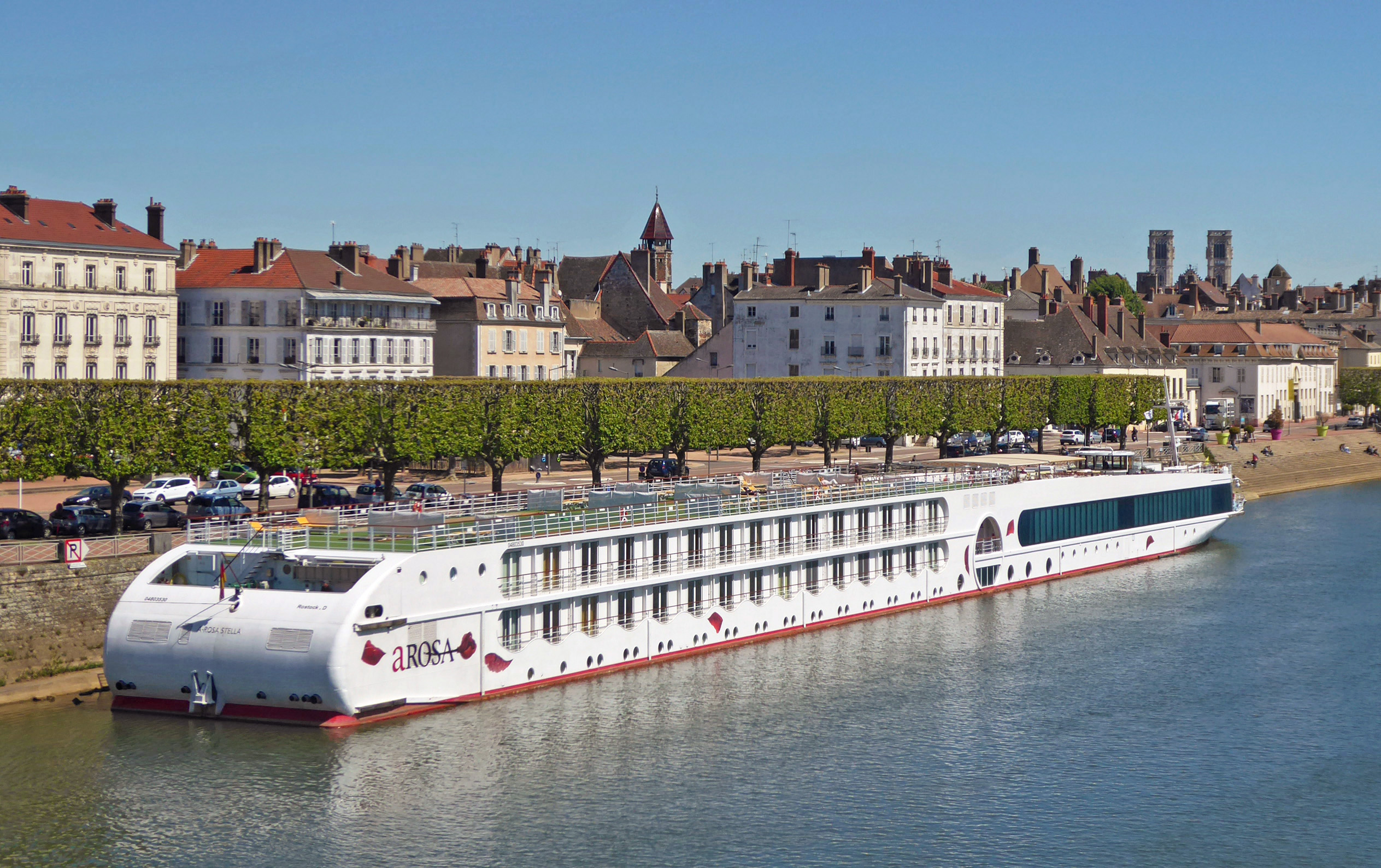
A-Rosa Stella in Chalon sur Saône

== See also ==
- List of river cruise ships
