= A-Rosa Donna =

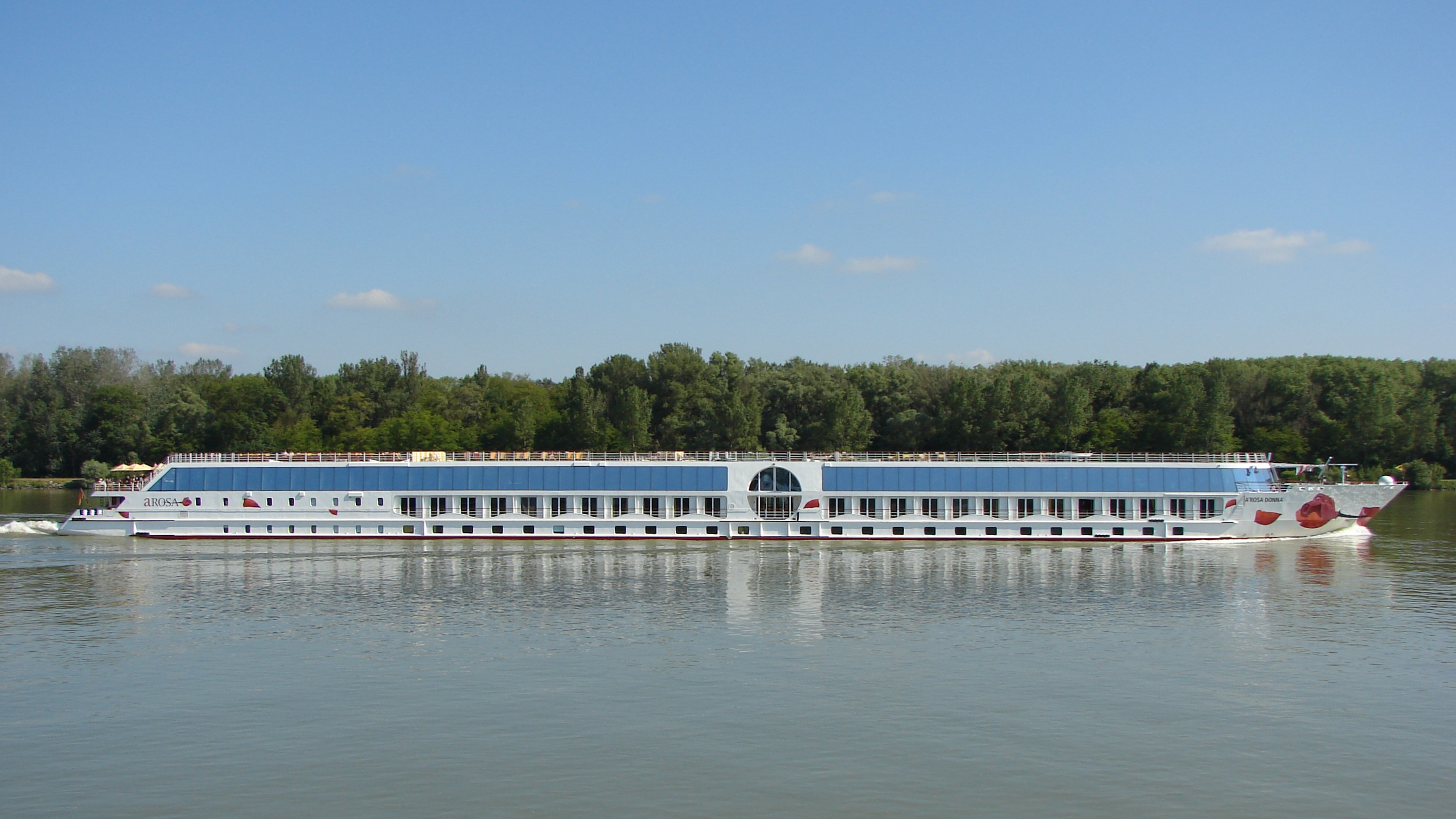
- A-Rosa Donna on the Danube in Lower Austria

History

Germany
- Name: A-Rosa Donna
- Owner: 2002–2012: A-ROSA Flussschiff
- Operator: A-ROSA Flussschiff
- Port of registry: Rostock, Germany
- Route: Passau – Vylkove
- Builder: Neptun Werft, Warnemünde, Germany
- Yard number: S.502
- Completed: March 2002
- Maiden voyage: 10 May 2002
- In service: 10 May 2002
- Identification: Call sign: DC8431; IMO number: 9271470; MMSI number: 211160680; ENI number: 04801130
- Status: in service

General characteristics
- Class & type: River cruise ship
- Tonnage: 3,524 GT
- Displacement: 1,850 t
- Length: 124.50 m (408.5 ft)
- Beam: 14.4 m (47 ft)
- Draught: 1.87 m (6.1 ft)
- Decks: 4
- Installed power: 2 × MTU 16V 2000 M60; 1,600 kilowatts (2,100 hp)
- Propulsion: 2 propellers (Z-drive) STP 500 1 × Schottel-Pump Jet-SPJ 57
- Speed: 24 km/h (15 mph; 13 kn)
- Capacity: 242 passengers (100 cabins)
- Crew: 50

A-Rosa Donna (registered ship name: A'Rosa Donna) is a German river cruise ship, cruising on the Danube river. The ship was built by Neptun Werft GmbH at their shipyard in Warnemünde, Germany, and entered service in May 2002. Her sister ships are A-Rosa Bella, A-Rosa Mia and A-Rosa Riva. Her home port is currently Rostock.

== Features ==
The ship has two restaurants, two lounges and two bars, Finnish sauna, biosauna and resting area.

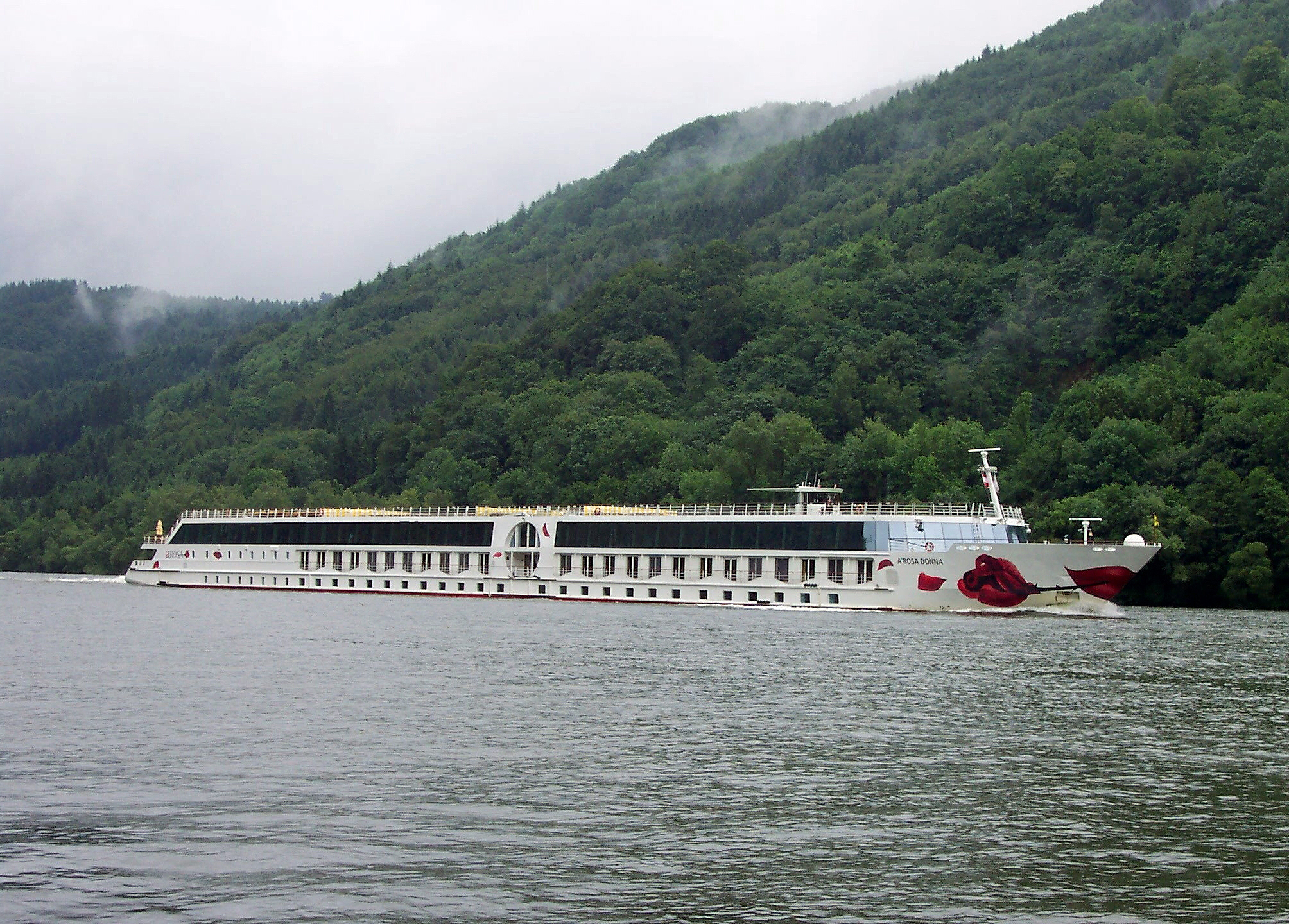
A-Rosa Donna underway

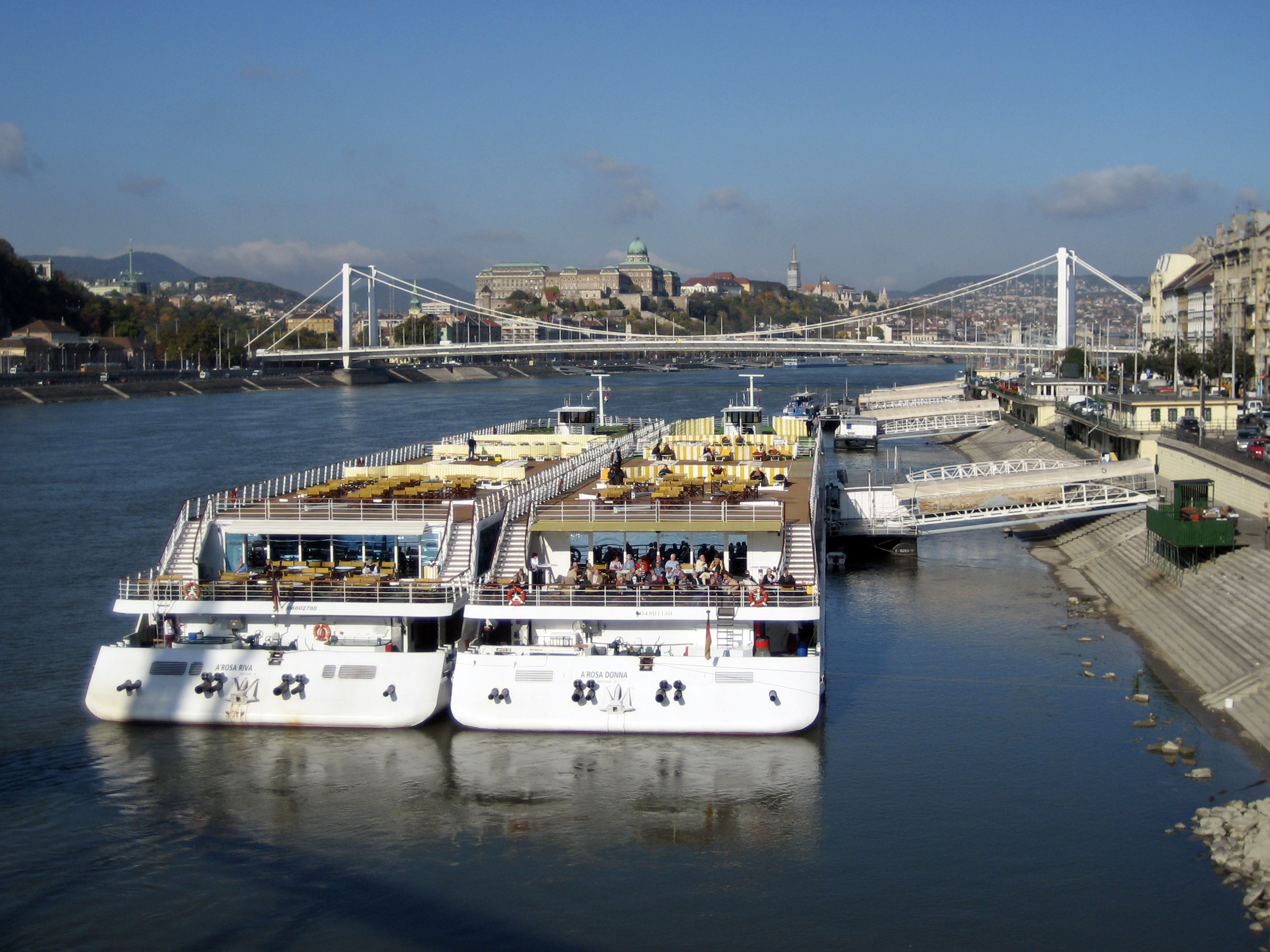
River cruise ships
A-Rosa Riva and A-Rosa Donna

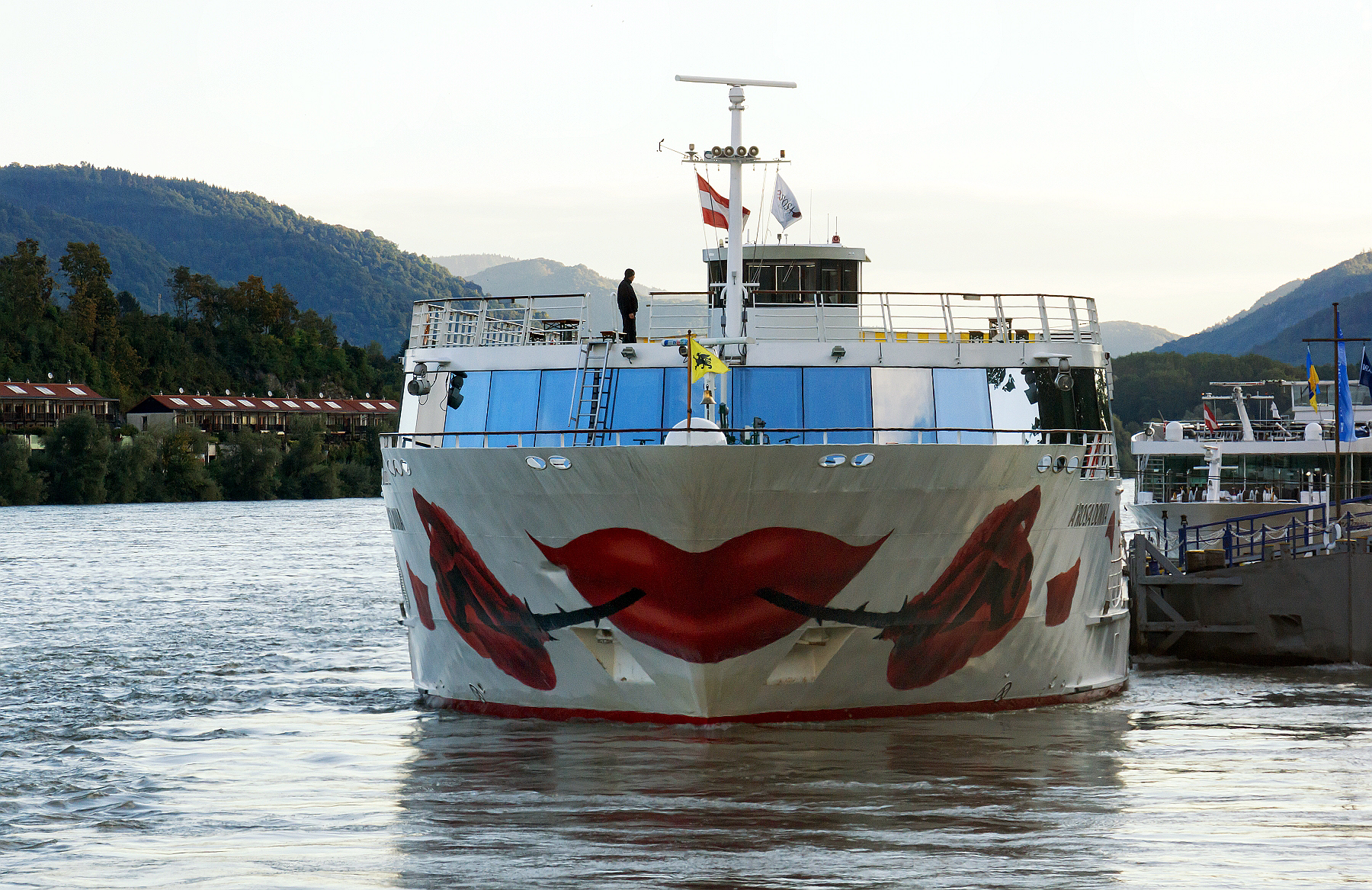
A'Rosa Donna

== See also ==
- List of river cruise ships
