= A-Rosa Luna =

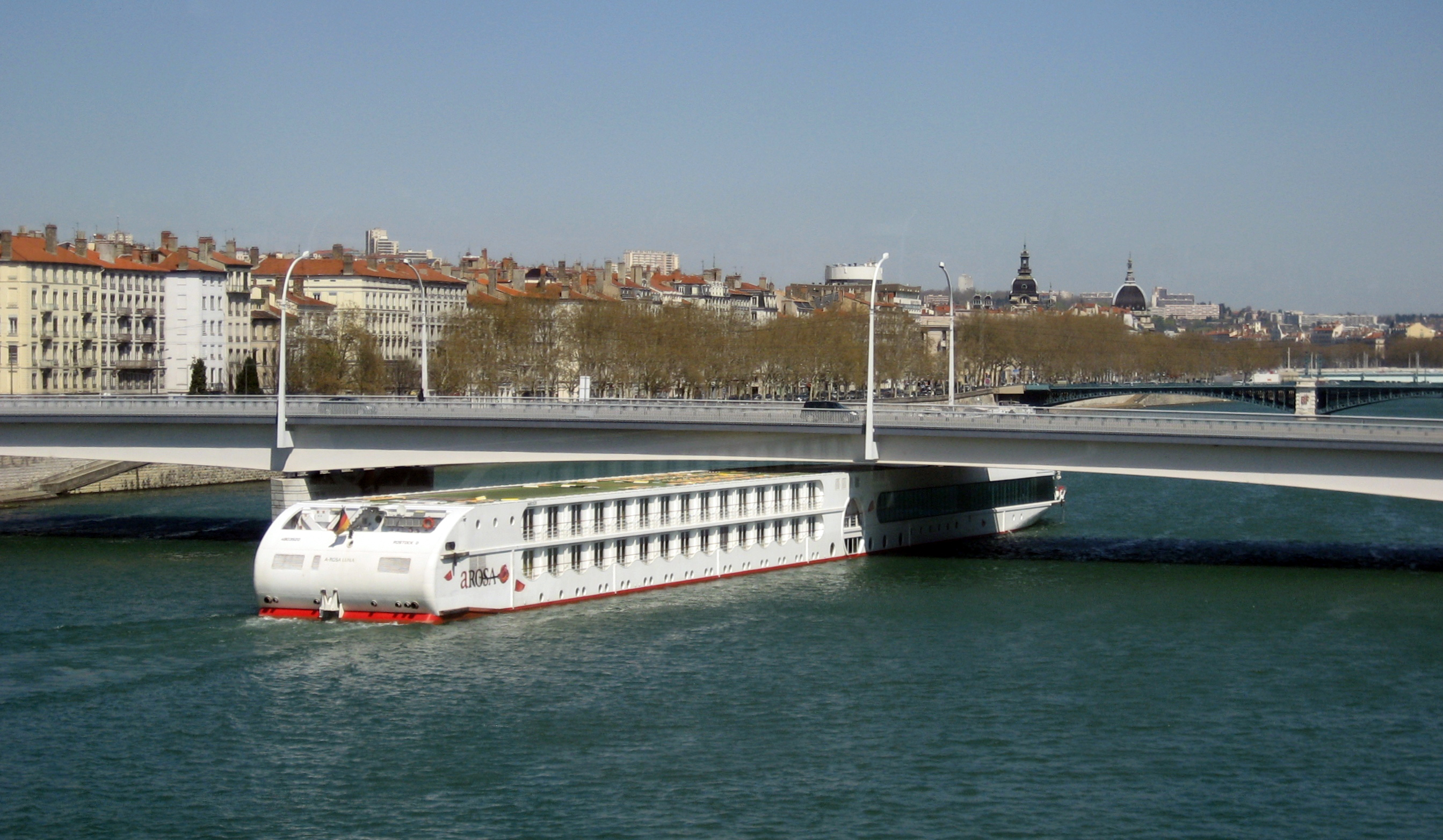
- A-Rosa Luna on the Rhone in Lyon

History

Germany
- Name: A-Rosa Luna
- Owner: 2005–2012: A-ROSA Flussschiff
- Operator: A-ROSA Flussschiff
- Port of registry: Rostock, Germany
- Route: Lyon – Avignon
- Ordered: 22 January 2004
- Builder: Neptun Werft, Warnemünde, Germany
- Yard number: S.511
- Launched: 16 December 2004
- Christened: 7 April 2005
- Completed: 6 April 2005
- In service: 2005
- Identification: Call sign: DF2445; MMSI number: 211160720; ENI number: 04803520
- Status: in service

General characteristics
- Class & type: River cruise ship
- Tonnage: 3,524 GT
- Displacement: 1,850 t
- Length: 125.80 m (412 ft 9 in)
- Beam: 11.4 m (37 ft 5 in)
- Draught: 1.35 m (4 ft 5 in)
- Decks: 4
- Installed power: 2 × MTU 16V 2000 M60; 1,600 kilowatts (2,100 hp)
- Propulsion: 2 Schottel twin propellers (Z-drive) STP 500 1 × Schottel Pump Jet-SPJ 57
- Speed: 24 kilometres per hour (15 mph; 13 kn)
- Capacity: 174 passengers (86 cabins)
- Crew: 45

A-Rosa Luna is a German river cruise ship, cruising in the Rhone – Saône basin. The ship was built by Neptun Werft GmbH at their shipyard in Warnemünde, Germany, and entered service in 2005. Her sister ship is A-Rosa Stella. Her home port is currently Rostock.

== Features ==
The ship has restaurant, two lounges and bar, big-chess, Finnish sauna, steam sauna and resting area.

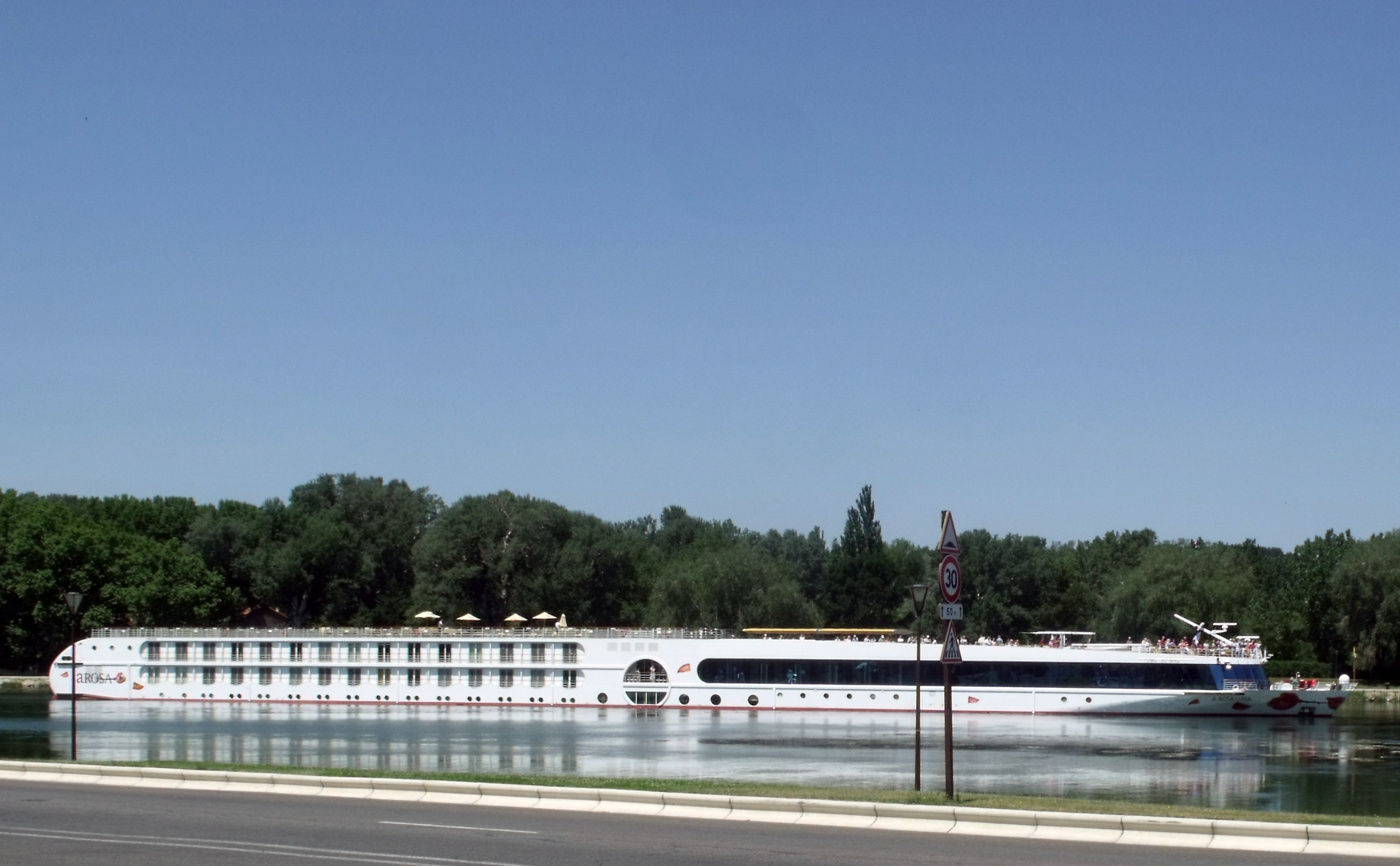
A-Rosa Luna on the Rhone

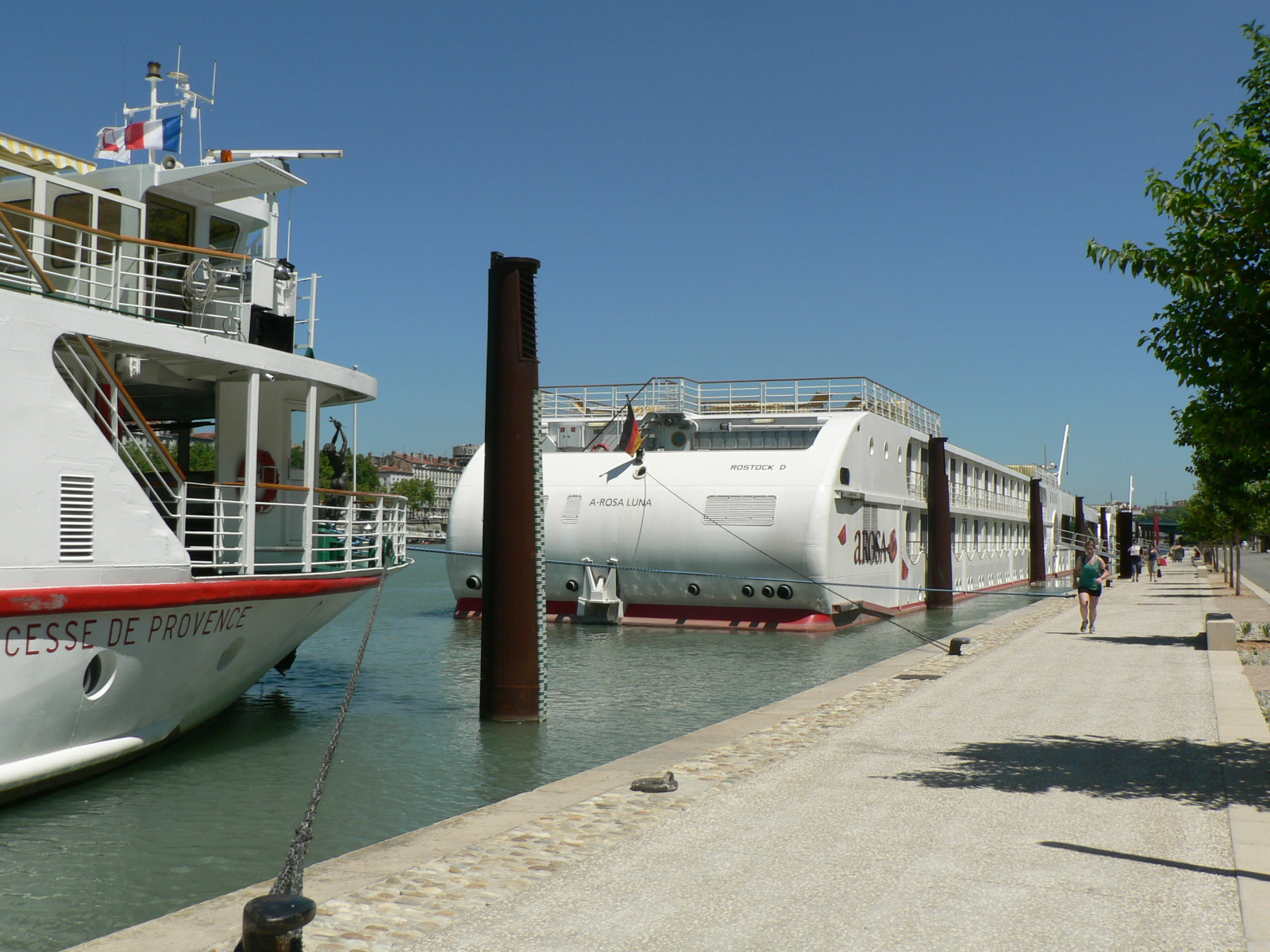
River cruise ships
Princesse de Provence and A-Rosa Luna

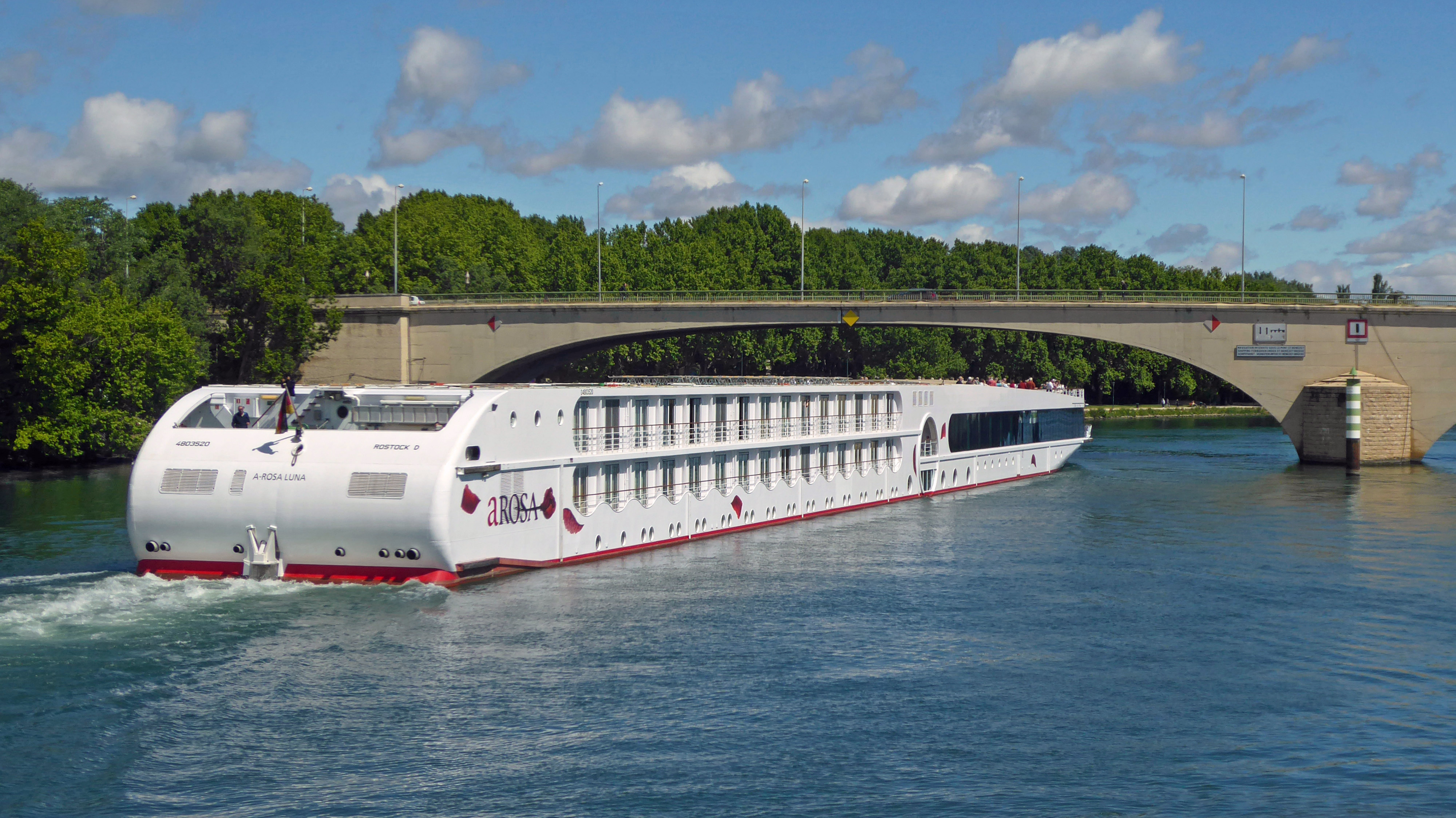
A-Rosa Luna in Avignon

== See also ==
- List of river cruise ships
