= A-Rosa Mia =

German river cruise ship

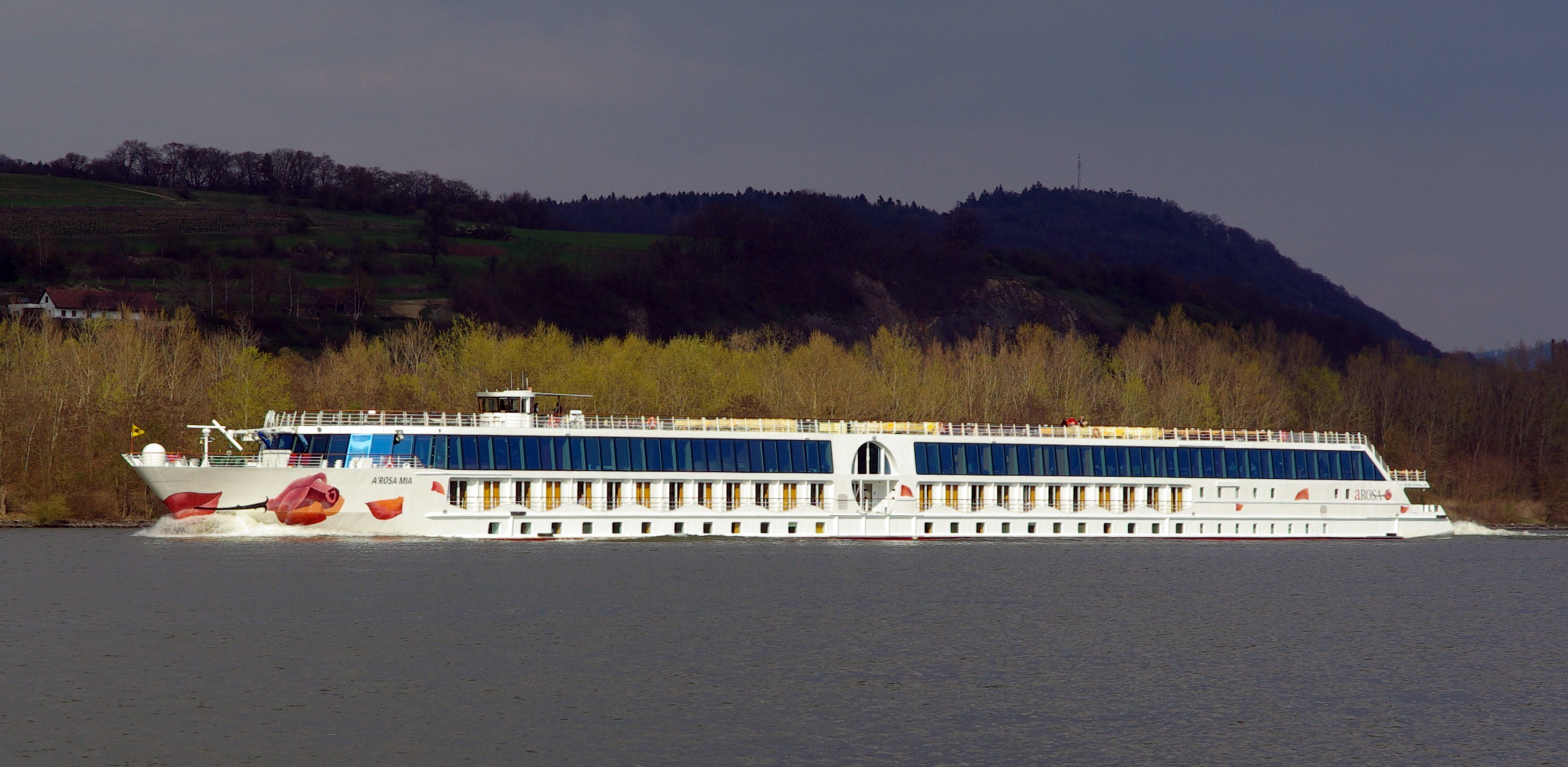
- A-Rosa Mia on the Danube in Lower Austria

History

Germany
- Name: A-Rosa Mia
- Owner: 2003–2012: A-ROSA Flussschiff
- Operator: A-ROSA Flussschiff
- Port of registry: Rostock, Germany
- Route: Passau – Vylkove
- Builder: Neptun Werft, Warnemünde, Germany
- Yard number: S.503
- Christened: 16 April 2003
- Completed: 27 February 2003
- Maiden voyage: 17 April 2003
- In service: 17 April 2003
- Identification: Call sign: DC5815; IMO number: 8979283; MMSI number: 211160700; ENI number: 04801870
- Status: in service

General characteristics
- Class & type: River cruise ship
- Tonnage: 3,524 GT
- Displacement: 1,850 t
- Length: 124.50 m (408.5 ft)
- Beam: 14.4 m (47 ft)
- Draught: 1.87 m (6.1 ft)
- Decks: 4
- Installed power: 2 × MTU 16V 2000 M60; 1,600 kilowatts (2,100 hp)
- Propulsion: 2 Schottel twin propellers (Z-drive) STP 500; 1 × Schottel Pump Jet-SPJ 57
- Speed: 24 km/h (15 mph; 13 kn)
- Capacity: 242 passengers (100 cabins)
- Crew: 50

A-Rosa Mia (registered ship name: A'Rosa Mia) is a German river cruise ship, cruising on the Danube river. The ship was built by Neptun Werft GmbH at their shipyard in Warnemünde, Germany, and entered service in April 2003. Her sister ships are A-Rosa Bella, A-Rosa Donna and A-Rosa Riva. Her home port is currently Rostock.

== Features ==
The ship has two restaurants, two lounges and two bars, Finnish sauna, biosauna and resting area.

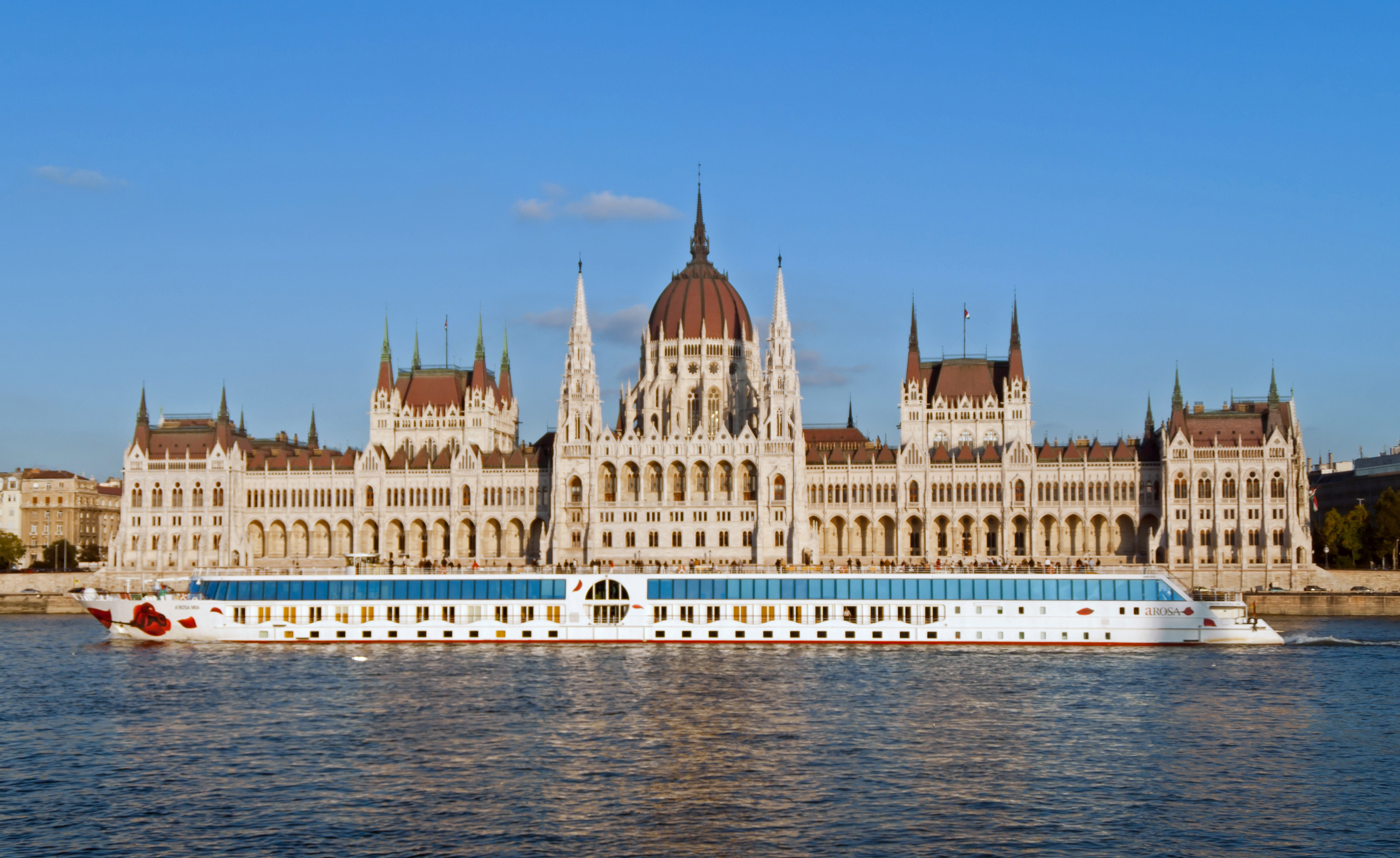
A-Rosa Mia in Budapest

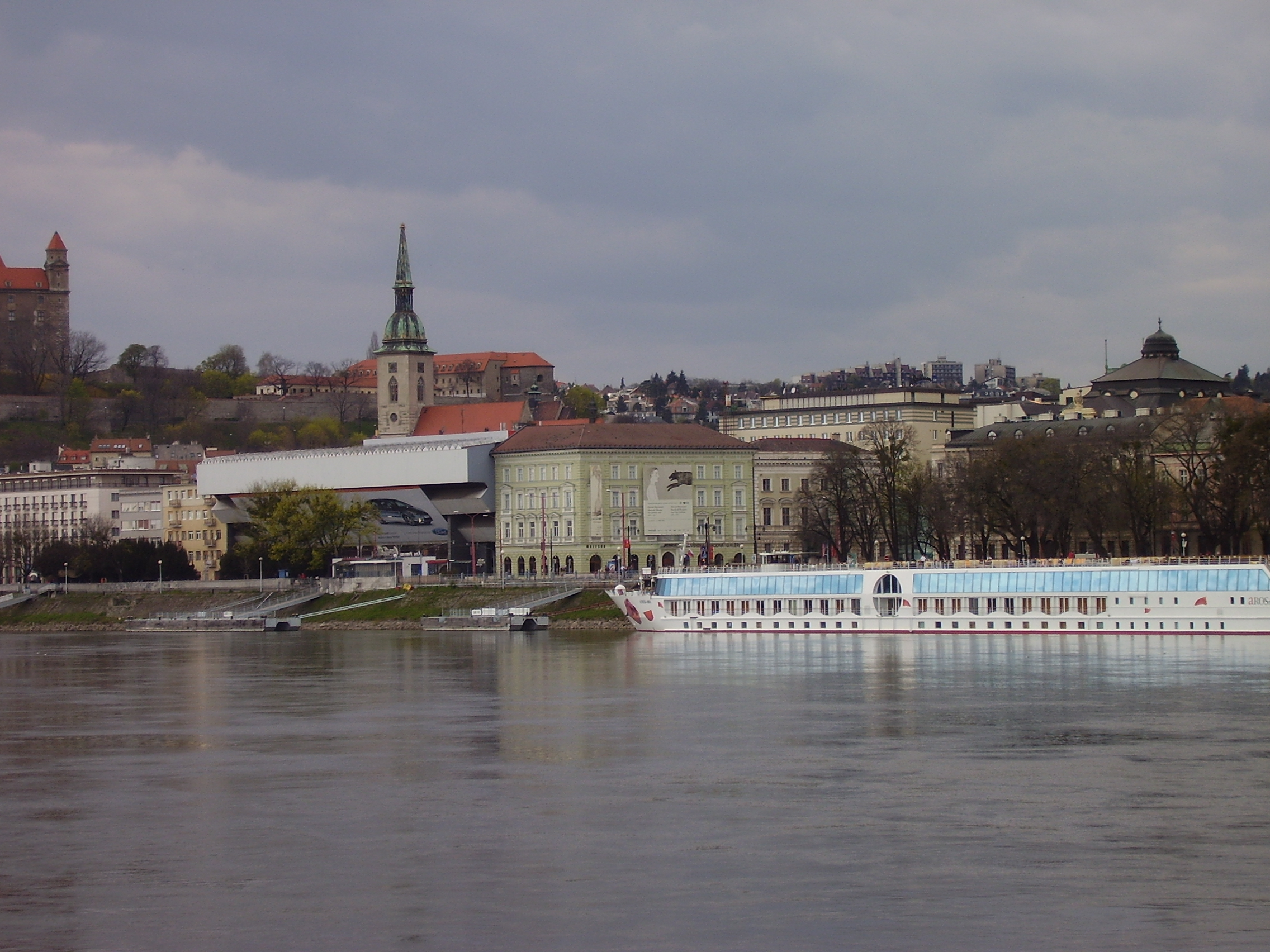
A-Rosa Mia at quay in Bratislava

== See also ==
- List of river cruise ships
