= Neptun Werft =

German shipbuilding company

Neptun Werft GmbH

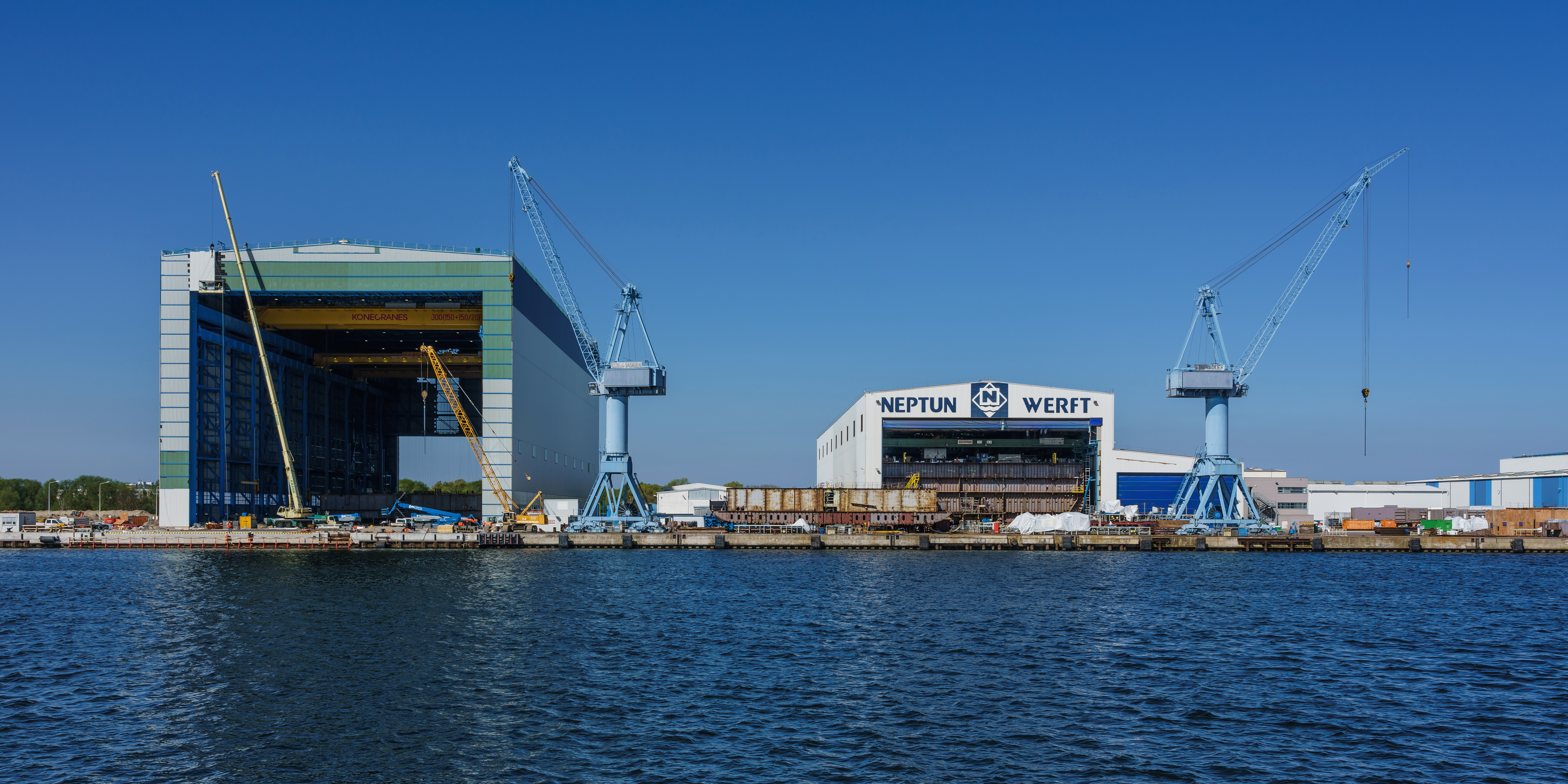
- Neptun Werft shipyard in Rostock
- Type: Subsidiary
- Industry: Shipbuilding
- Founded: 1850
- Headquarters: Rostock, Germany
- Key people: Manfred Müller-Fahrenholz (managing director)
- Number of employees: ~400
- Parent: Meyer Werft
- Website: neptunwerft.de

Neptun Werft (German pronunciation: [ˈnɛptuːn ˌvɛːʁft]; lit. 'Neptune Shipyard') is a German shipbuilding company in Rostock. Since 1997, it has been a subsidiary of Meyer Werft. As of 2026, the company specializes in building river cruise vessels.

== History ==
The company was founded as the "Schiffswerft und Maschinenfabrik von Wilhelm Zeltz und Albrecht Tischbein" in 1850 and their first iron steamship was launched in 1851. The shipyard developed quickly, and as early as in 1857 it had some 400 employees. In 1890, after several mergers and buyouts, it became the "Actien-Gesellschaft Neptun". After 1945 and the division of Germany, the shipyard focused on markets in Eastern Europe. At that time the "Schiffswerft Neptun Rostock" counted among the most renowned state-owned shipyards of the German Democratic Republic.

The changing conditions of international competition following the German reunification brought about a time of change for the company. Productivity was not up to international standards, and due to EU restrictions it was no longer allowed to build new sea-going vessels. The yard became "Neptun Industrie Rostock" (NIR), and the following years were heavily influenced by staff cuts, re-organisation and diversification. Focus was put on the repair and upgrading of ships, construction and delivery of ship components, steel constructions for hydraulic engineering and complex Ro-Ro facilities.

In 1997 Neptun Werft became part of the Meyer Neptun Group, which includes Meyer Werft in Papenburg. Neptun Werft has geared its activities to its core maritime sector, while many companies formerly belonging to NIR and dealing in different sectors were sold, or set up independent operations. Since the year 2000 the shipyard's activities have been centred on the premises in Warnemünde (a district of Rostock), and the construction of river cruise vessels has been included in the product range. New production halls were erected in 2003 which allow ship construction independent of weather conditions. A new hall was completed in 2018.

== Ships built by Neptun Werft (selection) ==
=== Civilian ships ===
Logo from 1953-1990.

==== Recent ====
- A'Rosa Bella (2002)
- A'Rosa Donna (2002)
- A'Rosa Mia (2003)
- A'Rosa Riva (2004)
- A'Rosa Luna (2005)
- A'Rosa Stella (2005)
- A'Rosa Aqua (2009)
- A'Rosa Viva (2010)
- A-Rosa Brava (2011)
- A-Rosa Silva (2012)
- A-Rosa Flora (2014)

==== Historic ====
- SS Denebola (1899)

=== Naval ships ===
- 34 x Type M1914/M1915/M1916 Minesweepers (1914 - 1918)
- 10 x Type VIIC U-boats: U-921 - U-930 (1941 - 1944)
- 2 x Replenishment oilers Type 707 tankers

=== Floating Engine Room Units ===
The shipyard is also building parts of ships for other shipyards of the Meyer Company ("Floating Engine Room Units"), for example "Floating Engine Room Units" (in 2019: 4)

=== Converter platforms ===
In the following years, the construction of converter platforms is planned. The cióntract for the first one was announced in June 2026, the completion is planned for 2034.
