= ENI number =

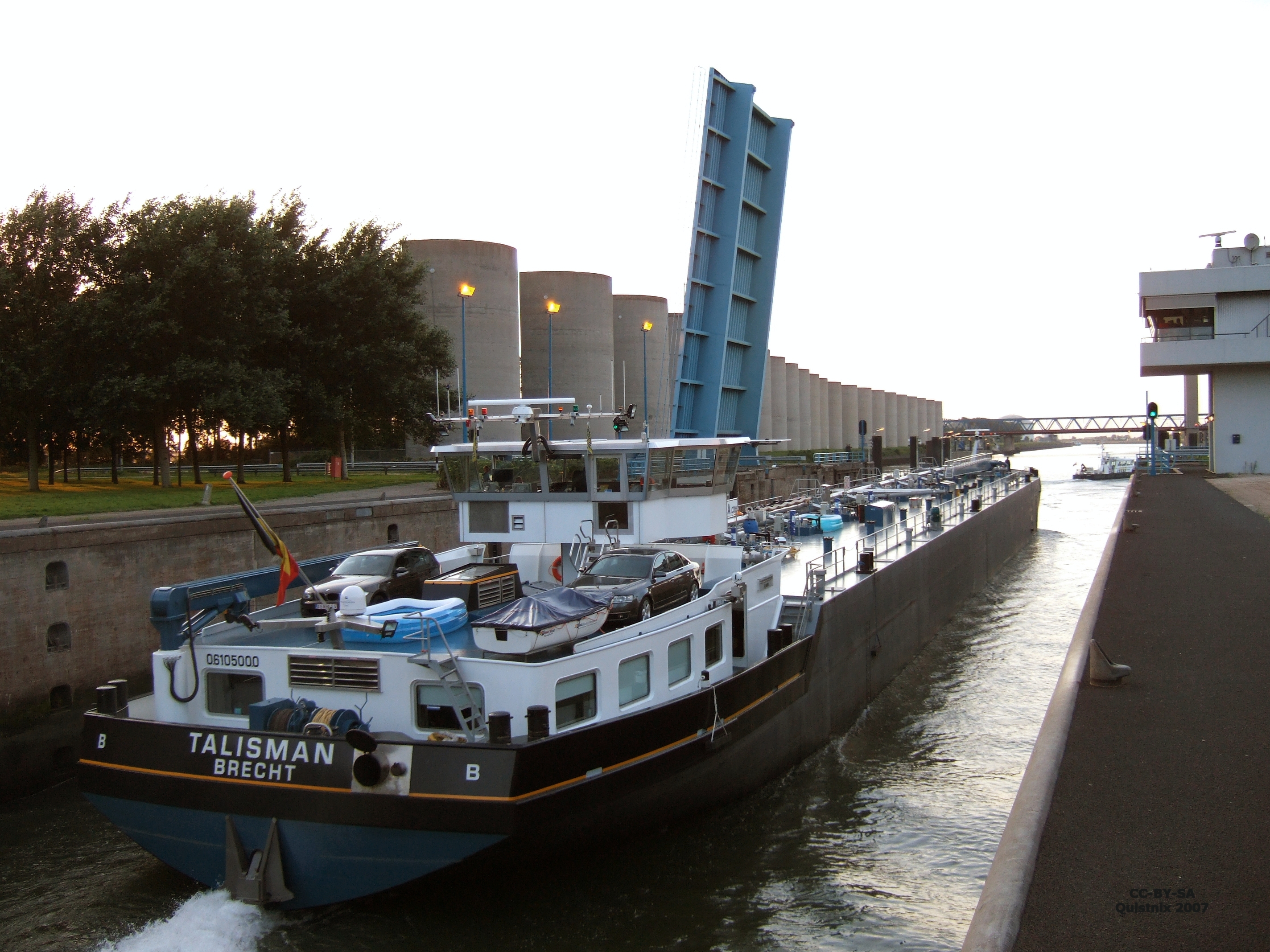
Belgian vessel Talisman of Brecht, displaying ENI number

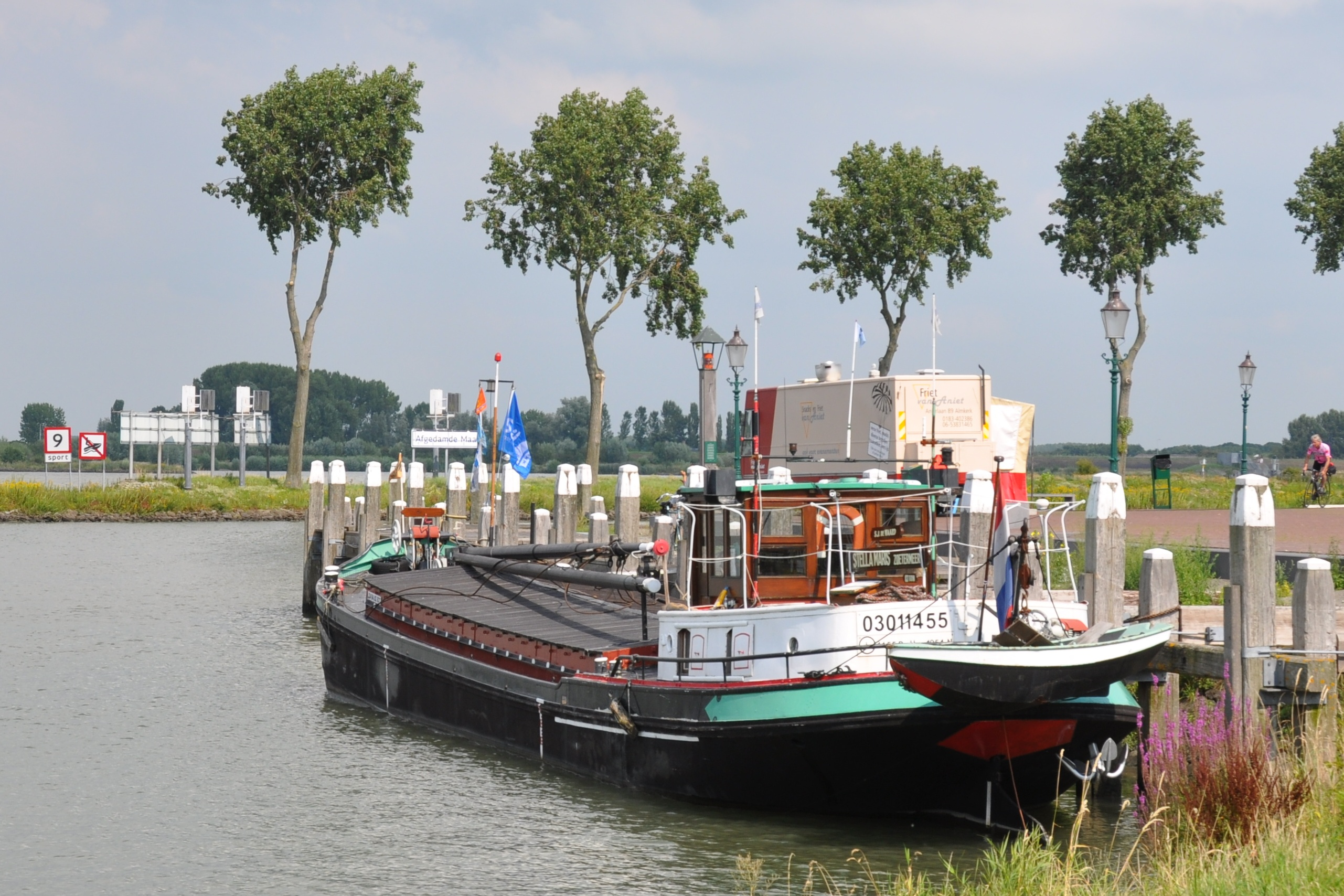
Dutch barge Stella Maris displaying ENI number

An ENI number (European Number of Identification or European Vessel Identification Number) is a registration for ships capable of navigating on inland European waters. It is a unique, eight-digit identifier that is attached to a hull for its entire lifetime, independent of the vessel's current name or flag.

ENI was introduced by the Inland Transport Committee of the United Nations Economic Commission for Europe in their meeting on 11–13 October 2006 in Geneva. It is based on the Rhine Vessel certification system previously used for ships navigating the Rhine, and is comparable to the IMO ship identification number.

== Format ==
The ENI number consists of eight Arabic numerals. The first three digits identify the competent authority where the number is assigned (see "List of prefixes" below) and the last five digits are a serial number.

Ships which have a vessel number in accordance to the Rhine Inspection Rules receive an ENI beginning with "0" and followed by the seven digit Rhine number. A vessel which has been issued an IMO number may only receive an ENI number if it has appropriate certifications for inland water travel. Its ENI will begin with "9" followed by its seven digit IMO number.

The ENI number is transmitted by Inland-Automatic Identification System transponders.

== Requirements ==
Not all European vessels are required to carry an ENI number. As of April 2007, a vessel must have an ENI if it operates on inland waterways and meets any of the following criteria: is over 20 metres (66 ft) in length; is greater than 100 cubic metres (3,531 cu ft) in volume; is a tug or push boat that operates with a qualifying vessel; is a passenger ship; or is a floating installation/equipment. If a vessel is issued an ENI, this number must be displayed on the sides and stern of the vessel.

== List of prefixes ==
Codes for countries
001 – 019 France; 020 – 039 Netherlands; 040 – 059 Germany; 060 – 069 Belgium; 070 – 079 Switzerland; 080 – 099 Reserved for ships of countries not party to the Mannheim Convention, with Rhine Vessel certificates issued before 1 April 2007.; 100 – 119 Norway; 120 – 139 Denmark; 140 – 159 United Kingdom; 160 – 169 Iceland; 170 – 179 Ireland; 180 – 189 Portugal; 190 – 199 Reserved; 200 – 219 Luxembourg; 220 – 239 Finland; 240 – 259 Poland; 260 – 269 Estonia; 270 – 279 Lithuania; 280 – 289 Latvia; 290 – 299 Reserved; 300 – 309 Austria	310 – 319 Liechtenstein; 320 – 329 Czech Republic; 330 – 339 Slovakia; 340 – 349 Reserved; 350 – 359 Croatia; 360 – 369 Serbia; 370 – 379 Bosnia and Herzegovina; 380 – 399 Hungary; 400 – 419 Russia; 420 – 439 Ukraine; 440 – 449 Belarus; 450 – 459 Moldova; 460 – 469 Romania; 470 – 479 Bulgaria; 480 – 489 Georgia; 490 – 499 Reserved; 500 – 519 Turkey; 520 – 539 Greece; 540 – 549 Cyprus; 550 – 559 Albania; 560 – 569 North Macedonia; 570 – 579 Slovenia	580 – 589 Montenegro; 590 – 599 Reserved; 600 – 619 Italy; 620 – 639 Spain; 640 – 649 Andorra; 650 – 659 Malta; 660 – 669 Monaco; 670 – 679 San Marino; 680 – 699 Reserved; 700 – 719 Sweden; 720 – 739 Canada; 740 – 759 United States; 760 – 769 Israel; 770 – 799 Reserved; 800 – 809 Azerbaijan; 810 – 819 Kazakhstan; 820 – 829 Kyrgyzstan; 830 – 839 Tajikistan; 840 – 849 Turkmenistan; 850 – 859 Uzbekistan; 860 – 869 Iran; 870 – 999 Reserved
