= Maksim Gorkiy-class motorship =

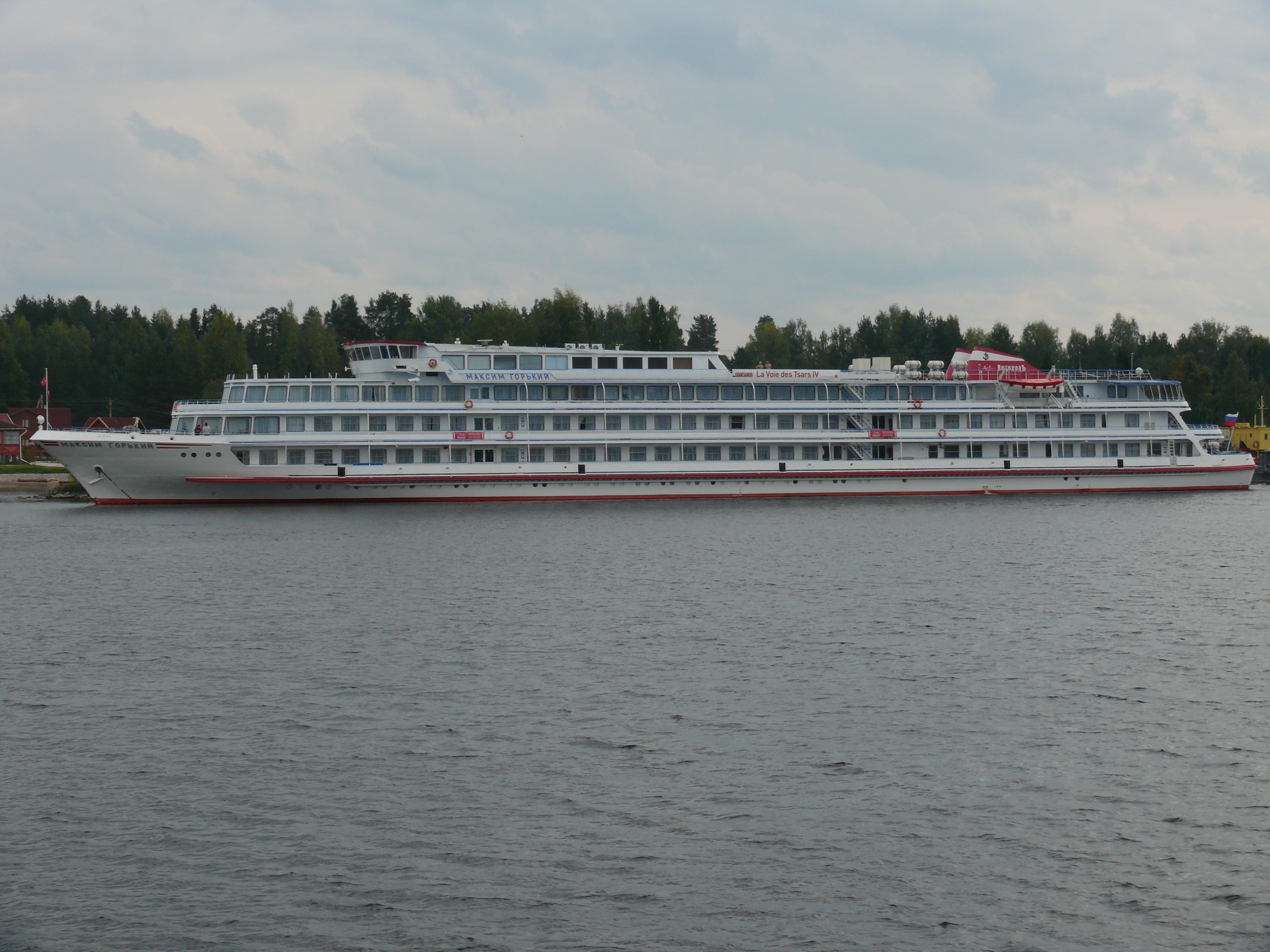
- River cruise ship Maksim Gorkiy in Moscow

Class overview
- Builders: Österreichische Schiffswerften AG, Korneuburg, Austria
- Built: 1974
- Planned: 2
- Building: 2
- Completed: 2
- Active: 2

General characteristics
- Displacement: 2,099 t
- Length: 110.1 m (361 ft 3 in)
- Beam: 14.5 m (47 ft 7 in)
- Draught: 2.2 m (7 ft 3 in)
- Decks: 4 passenger decks
- Installed power: 2 × 6ChRN 36/45 G-60 1,352 kW (1,813 hp)
- Propulsion: 2
- Speed: 22 km/h (14 mph; 12 kn)
- Capacity: 216 passengers
- Crew: 66

The Maksim Gorkiy class is a class of Russian river passenger ships. It is named after the lead ship in the class, Maksim Gorkiy. The four-deck cruise ships were built in Austria in 1974.

== River cruise ships of the Austrian project Q-040 ==
Maksim Gorkiy-class motorships
No.	Original name	English transliteration
1	Максим Горький	Maksim Gorkiy
2	Александр Пушкин	Aleksandr Pushkin

== Overview ==
Maksim Gorkiy-class motorships (project Q-040)
Month and year of build	Hull No	Image	Name	Customer	Port of registry	Flag	Status and Position
April 1974	K704		Maksim Gorkiy	Volga Shipping Company	Gorky → Nizhny Novgorod	→	RRR No.: 019376, MMSI number: 997799990
October 1974	K705		Aleksandr Pushkin	Wolga-Reederei	Gorky → Nizhny Novgorod	→	RRR No. 019377

== See also ==
- List of river cruise ships
- Valerian Kuybyshev-class motorship
- Rossiya-class motorship
- Rossiya-class motorship (1973)
- Anton Chekhov-class motorship
- Vladimir Ilyich-class motorship
- Rodina-class motorship
- Baykal-class motorship
- Dmitriy Furmanov-class motorship
- Sergey Yesenin-class motorship
- Oktyabrskaya Revolyutsiya-class motorship
- Yerofey Khabarov-class motorship
- Dunay-class motorship
