= Vladimir Ilyich-class motorship =

Russian river passenger ship

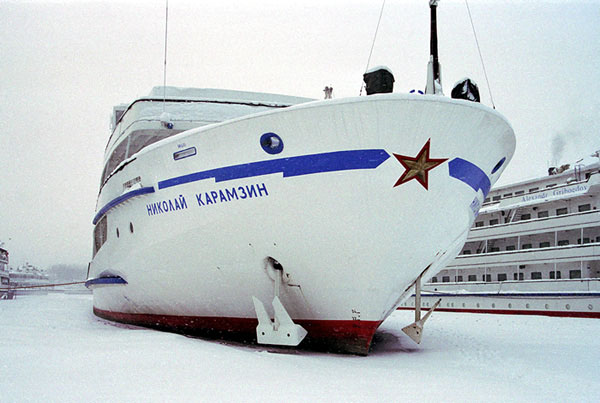
- River cruise ship Nikolay Karamzin in winter 2001 in Khlebnikovskiy MSZ

Class overview
- Builders: VEB Elbewerften Boizenburg/Roßlau, Boizenburg, East Germany
- Succeeded by: Dmitriy Furmanov-class (302)
- Built: 1974
- Planned: 22
- Building: 22
- Completed: 22
- Active: 20
- Scrapped: 2

General characteristics
- Tonnage: GT
- Displacement: 3,570 t
- Length: 125.0 m (410.1 ft)
- Beam: 16.7 m (55 ft)
- Draught: 2.76 m (9.1 ft)
- Decks: 4 passenger decks
- Installed power: 3 × 6ChRN 36/45 EG-70-5 2,208 kilowatts (2,961 hp)
- Propulsion: 3
- Speed: 26.2 km/h (16.3 mph; 14.1 kn)
- Capacity: 360 passengers
- Crew: 84

Vladimir Ilyich class is a class of Russian river passenger ships. It is named after the first ship of the class Vladimir Ilyich.

Four-deck cruise ships manufactured in Germany, 1974–1983.

== River cruise ships of the German Project 301 / BiFa125M ==
Vladimir Ilyich class
No.	Original name	English transliteration
First series of Project 301
1	Владимир Ильич (Санкт-Петербург)	Vladimir Ilyich (Sankt-Peterburg)
2	Мария Ульянова, (Петергоф, Викинг Рюрик)	Mariya Ulyanova (Petergof, Viking Rurik)
3	Евгений Вучетич (Принцеса Днiпра)	Yevgeniy Vuchetich (Printsesa Dnipra)
4	Советская Украина (Константин Коротков)	Sovetskaya Ukraina (Konstantin Korotkov)
5	Тихий Дон	Tikhiy Don
6	XXV съезд КПСС (Леся Українка, Леся Украинка, Петр Чайковский)	XXV Syezd KPSS (Lesya Ukrai’nka, Lesya Ukrainka, Petr Chaykovskiy)
Second series of Project 301
7	Советская Россия (Нижний Новгород)	Sovetskaya Rossiya (Nizhny Novgorod)
8	60 лет Октября (Floks, Avicena)	60 let Oktyabrya (Floks, Avicena)
9	Россия (Советская Россия, Россия)	Rossiya (Sovetskaya Rossiya, Rossiya)
10	Владимир Маяковский	Vladimir Mayakovskiy
11	В. И. Ленин (Максим Рильський, Максим Рыльский, Михаил Булгаков)	V. I. Lenin (Maksym Rilskiy (ukr.), Maksim Rylskiy (russ.), Mikhail Bulgakov)
12	Александр Ульянов (Кронштадт)	Aleksandr Ulyanov (Kronshtadt)
13	Михаил Ломоносов (Вікінг Сінеус)	Mikhail Lomonosov (Viking Sineus)
14	Константин Федин	Konstantin Fedin
15	30 лет ГДР (Владимир Арсеньев, Ferris Flotel)	30 let GDR (Vladimir Arsenyev, Ferris Flotel)
16	Виссарион Белинский	Vissarion Belinskiy
Third series of Project 301
17	Советская Конституция (Николай Карамзин)	Sovetskaya Konstitutsiya (Nikolay Karamzin)
18	Николай Чернышевский	Nikolay Chernyshevskiy
19	Николай Добролюбов (Андрей Рублев)	Nikolay Dobrolyubov (Andrey Rublev)
20	Александр Радищев	Aleksandr Radishchev
21	Александр Грибоедов (Княжна Виктория)	Aleksandr Griboyedov (Knyazhna Viktoriya)
22	Федор Достоевский	Fedor Dostoevskiy

== Overview ==
Year of build	Yard No	Image	Name	Owner	Operator	Port of Registry	Flag	IMO	Status
Project 301 - First Series
April 1975	326		Sankt-Peterburg	Severo-Zapadnyy Flot		Leningrad → Saint Petersburg	→		originally, the Vladimir Ilyich, RRR 160201
July 1975	327		Viking Rurik	Passazhirskiy Flot	Viking River Cruises	Leningrad → Saint Petersburg	→		originally, the Mariya Ulyanova, Petergof completely refurbished for the 2012 sailing season, RRR 160202
1976	328		Printsesa Dnipra	Chervona Ruta	Chervona Ruta	Kiev → Kherson	→		originally, the Yevgeniy Vuchetich, RSU 2-000364
July 1976	329		Konstantin Korotkov	Vodohod	Vodohod	Gorky → Nizhny Novgorod	→	7515432	originally, the Sovetskaya Ukraina
March 1977	330		Tikhiy Don	Doninturflot	Phoenix	Rostov-on-Don → Moscow → Rostov-on-Don	→	7523752	RRR 160204
1977	331		Petr Chaykovskiy	DonInturFlot	Orthodox Cruise Company	Kiev → Kherson → Moscow → Rostov-on-Don	→ →	7608526	originally, the XXV Syezd KPSS, formerly: Lesya Ukrai’nka (ukr. Леся Українка), Lesya Ukrainka (russ. Леся Украинка)
Project 301 - Second Series
September 1977	332		Nizhny Novgorod	Vodohod	Vodohod	Gorky → Nizhny Novgorod	→	7617785	originally, the Sovetskaya Rossiya
1978	333		Avicena		Andrea Navigation	Moscow → Kingstown	→	8884749	originally, the 60 let Oktyabrya, formerly: Floks, Vision Clinic, scrapped in Alang on May 16, 2006
1978	334		Rossiya	Grand Circle Cruise Line		Kiev → Kherson → Moscow	→ →	7638155	originally, the Rossiya (1978–1979), Sovetskaya Rossiya (1979–2003)
September 1978	335		Vladimir Mayakovskiy	Kama One Shipping Co Ltd.	Orthodox Cruise Company	Perm	→	7706677	
July 1979	336		Mikhail Bulgakov	–	MosTurFlot	Kiev → Kherson → Moscow	→ →	7706689	originally, the V. I. Lenin, formerly: Maksym Rilskiy (ukr.), Maksim Rylskiy (russ.)
August 1979	337		Kronshtadt	Sewero-Sapadny Flot		Leningrad → Saint Petersburg	→	7706691	originally, the Aleksandr Ulyanov
September 1979	338		Viking Sineus	Viking Ukraina	Viking River Cruises	Petrozavodsk → Saint Petersburg → Kherson	→ →	7823994	originally, the Mikhail Lomonosov
April 1980	339		Konstantin Fedin	Vodohod	Vodohod	Gorky → Nizhny Novgorod	→	8031354	
1980	370		Ferris Flotel			Rostov-on-Don → Khabarovsk → Busan	→ →	8031366	originally, the 30 let GDR, formerly: Vladimir Arsenyev; 2003 sank at quay in Busan and 2005 scrapped
November 1980	371		Vissarion Belinskiy	Vodohod	Vodohod	Leningrad → Saint Petersburg → Nizhny Novgorod → Saint Petersburg	→	8031378	
Project 301 - Third Series
May 1981	372		Nikolay Karamzin	MosTurFlot	MosTurFlot	Moscow	→	8131518	originally, the Sovetskaya Konstitutsiya
August 1981	373		Nikolay Chernyshevskiy	Vodohod	Vodohod	Gorky → Nizhny Novgorod	→	8131520	
September 1981	374		Andrey Rublev	Zentralnaja sudohodnaja kompanija	MosTurFlot	Kiev → Moscow	→ →	8131532	originally, the Nikolay Dobrolyubov
May 1982	375		Aleksandr Radishchev	Vodohod	Vodohod	Gorky → Nizhny Novgorod	→	8225682	RRR 160216
May 1982	376		Knyazhna Viktoriya	MosTurFlot	MosTurFlot	Moscow	→	8225694	originally, the Aleksandr Griboyedov
March 1983	377		Fedor Dostoevskiy	Kama One Shipping Co Ltd.	Parus	Perm	→	8212910	

== See also ==
- List of river cruise ships
- Anton Chekhov-class motorship
- Baykal-class motorship
- Dmitriy Furmanov-class motorship
- Maksim Gorkiy-class motorship
- Oktyabrskaya Revolyutsiya-class motorship
- Rodina-class motorship
- Rossiya-class motorship (1952)
- Rossiya-class motorship (1973)
- Sergey Yesenin-class motorship
- Valerian Kuybyshev-class motorship
- Yerofey Khabarov-class motorship
