= Georgiy Zhukov (ship) =

Soviet and Russian river cruise ship

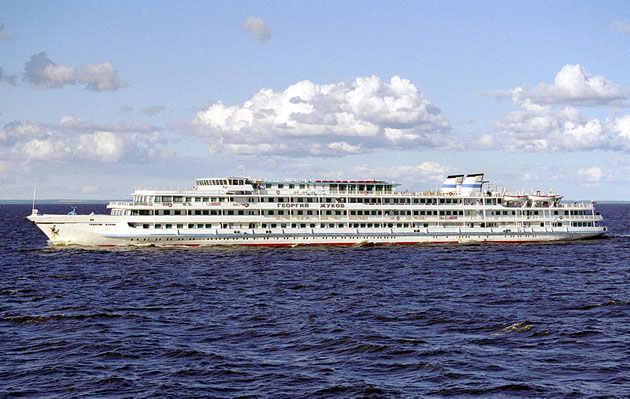
- Georgiy Zhukov passing through the Volga–Baltic Waterway, in 2001

History
- Name: Georgiy Zhukov: 1983–present
- Owner: 1983–1994: Volga Shipping Company (ГП Волжское объединённое речное пароходство МРФ РСФСР); 1994–2012: Volga Shipping Company (ОАО Волжское пароходство); 2012: OOO V. F. Passazhirskiye Perevozki (ООО В.Ф. Пассажирские перевозки); 2012–present: Vodohod
- Operator: Volga Shipping Company; Vodohod
- Port of registry: 1981–1994: Gorky, Soviet Union; 1994–2020: Nizhny Novgorod, Russia
- Route: Kazan – Samara, Nizhny Novgorod – Kazan, Samara – Volgograd, Kazan – Astrakhan, Kazan – Saint Petersburg, Samara – Rostov-on-Don
- Builder: Slovenské Lodenice, Komárno, Czechoslovakia
- Yard number: 2009
- Completed: 1983
- In service: 1983
- Identification: RRR number: 140663; MMSI number: 273359940
- Status: In service

General characteristics
- Class & type: Valerian Kuybyshev-class river cruise ship
- Tonnage: 6,315 GT; 550 DWT
- Displacement: 4,050 t
- Length: 135.75 m (445.4 ft)
- Beam: 16.8 m (55 ft)
- Draught: 2.9 m (9.5 ft)
- Decks: 5 (4 passenger accessible)
- Installed power: 3 x 6ЧРН36/45 (ЭГ70-5)2,208 kilowatts (2,961 hp)
- Propulsion: 3 propellers
- Speed: 26 km/h (16 mph; 14 kn)
- Capacity: 362 passengers
- Crew: 85

Georgiy Zhukov (Russian: Георгий Жуков) is a Valerian Kuybyshev-class (92-016, OL400) Soviet/Russian river cruise ship, cruising in the Volga basin. The ship was built by Slovenské Lodenice at their shipyard in Komárno, Czechoslovakia, and entered service in 1983. At 4,050 tonnes, Georgiy Zhukov is one of the world's biggest river cruise ships. Her sister ships are Valerian Kuybyshev, Fyodor Shalyapin, Feliks Dzerzhinskiy, Sergey Kuchkin, Mikhail Frunze, Mstislav Rostropovich, Aleksandr Suvorov and Semyon Budyonnyy. Georgiy Zhukov is currently owned and operated by Vodohod, a Russian river cruise line. Her home port is currently Nizhny Novgorod. Captain of the Georgiy Zhukov (2014) is Viktor Prigorshnev.

== Features ==
The ship has two restaurants, two bars, conference hall, solarium and library.

== See also ==
- List of river cruise ships
