= Fyodor Shalyapin (ship) =

Valerian Kuybyshev-class river cruise ship

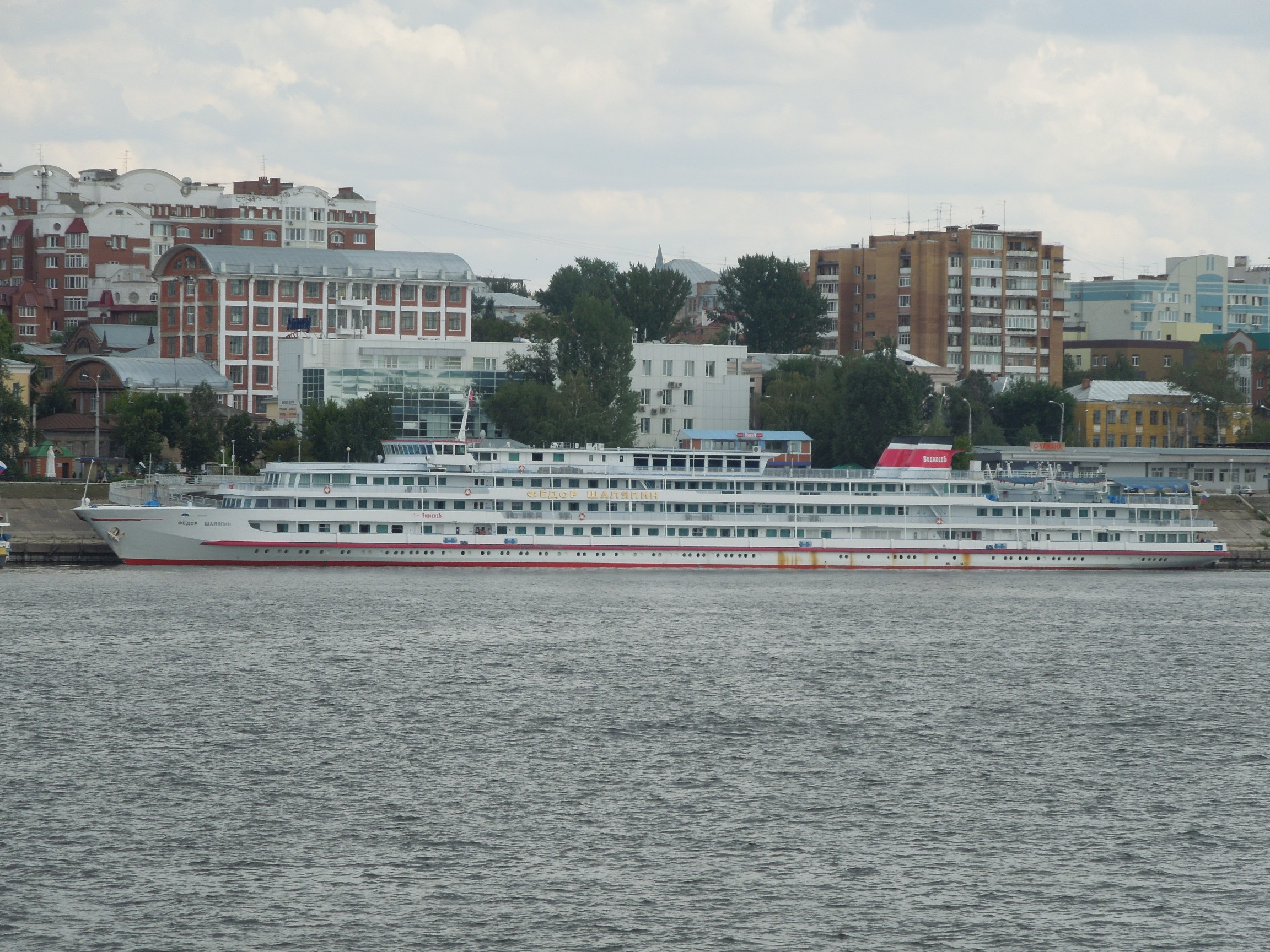
- Fyodor Shalyapin at pier in Samara, in 2012

History
- Name: Fyodor Shalyapin: 1992–present; Kliment Voroshilov: 1977–1992
- Owner: 1977–1994: Volga Shipping Company (ГП Волжское объединённое речное пароходство МРФ РСФСР); 1994–2012: Volga Shipping Company (ОАО Волжское пароходство); 2012: OOO V. F. Passazhirskiye Perevozki (ООО В.Ф. Пассажирские перевозки); 2012–present: Vodohod
- Operator: Volga Shipping Company; Volga–Flot–Tur; Vodohod
- Port of registry: 1977–1992: Gorky, Soviet Union; 1992–2014: Nizhny Novgorod, Russia
- Route: Samara – Kazan, Samara – Yaroslavl, Samara – Volgograd
- Builder: Slovenské Lodenice, Komárno, Czechoslovakia
- Yard number: 2002
- Laid down: 1976
- Completed: 1977
- In service: 1977
- Out of service: November 2022
- Identification: RRR number: 140656
- Fate: Scrapped by Chkalovsk shipyard in 2023

General characteristics
- Class & type: Valerian Kuybyshev-class River cruise ship
- Tonnage: 6,329 GT; 607 DWT
- Displacement: 3,950 t
- Length: 135.75 m (445.4 ft)
- Beam: 16.8 m (55 ft)
- Draught: 2.9 m (9.5 ft)
- Decks: 5 (4 passenger accessible)
- Installed power: 3 x 6ЧРН36/45 (ЭГ70-5)2,208 kilowatts (2,961 hp)
- Propulsion: 3 propellers
- Speed: 26 km/h (16 mph; 14 kn)
- Capacity: 347 passengers
- Crew: 84

The Fyodor Shalyapin (Russian: Фёдор Шаляпин) (former Kliment Voroshilov) was a Valerian Kuybyshev-class (92-016, OL400) Soviet/Russian river cruise ship, cruising in the Volga basin. The ship was built by Slovenské Lodenice at their shipyard in Komárno, Czechoslovakia, and entered service in 1977. At 3,950 tonnes, Fyodor Shalyapin is one of the world's biggest river cruise ships. Her sister ships are Valerian Kuybyshev, Mikhail Frunze, Feliks Dzerzhinskiy, Sergey Kuchkin, Mstislav Rostropovich, Aleksandr Suvorov, Semyon Budyonnyy and Georgiy Zhukov. Fyodor Shalyapin was operated by Vodohod, a Russian river cruise line. Her home port was Nizhny Novgorod.

== Features ==
The ship has two restaurants, three bars, solarium, sauna and resting area.

== See also ==
- List of river cruise ships
