= Semyon Budyonnyy (ship) =

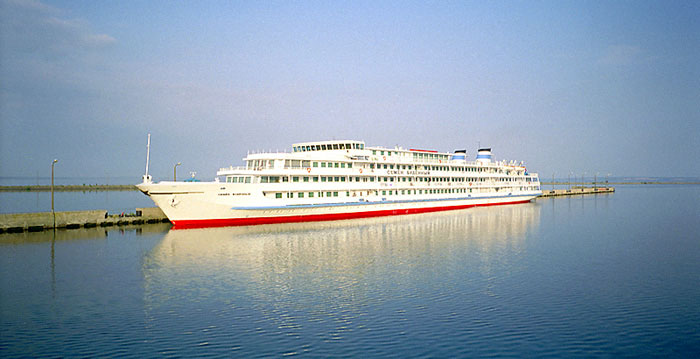
- Semyon Budyonnyy near Gorodets Hydraulic structure, in 1999

History
- Name: Semyon Budyonnyy: 1981–present
- Owner: 1981–1994: Volga Shipping Company (ГП Волжское объединённое речное пароходство МРФ РСФСР); 1994–2012: Volga Shipping Company (ОАО Волжское пароходство); 2012: OOO V. F. Passazhirskiye Perevozki (ООО В.Ф. Пассажирские перевозки); 2012–present: Vodohod
- Operator: Volga Shipping Company; Vodohod
- Port of registry: 1981–1994: Gorky, Soviet Union; 1994–2020: Nizhny Novgorod, Russia
- Route: Kazan – Samara, Nizhny Novgorod – Kazan, Samara – Volgograd, Kazan – Astrakhan, Kazan – Saint Petersburg, Samara – Rostov-on-Don
- Builder: Slovenské Lodenice, Komárno, Czechoslovakia
- Yard number: 2008
- Completed: 1981
- In service: 1981
- Identification: RRR number: 140662; MMSI number: 273358940
- Status: In service

General characteristics
- Class & type: Valerian Kuybyshev-class River cruise ship
- Tonnage: 6,328 GT; 602 DWT
- Displacement: 3,950 t
- Length: 135.75 m (445.4 ft)
- Beam: 16.8 m (55 ft)
- Draught: 2.9 m (9.5 ft)
- Decks: 5 (4 passenger accessible)
- Installed power: 3 x 6ЧРН36/45 (ЭГ70-5)2,208 kilowatts (2,961 hp)
- Propulsion: 3 propellers
- Speed: 26 km/h (16 mph; 14 kn)
- Capacity: 326 passengers
- Crew: 84

The Semyon Budyonnyy (Russian: Семён Будённый) is a Valerian Kuybyshev-class (92-016, OL400) Soviet/Russian river cruise ship, cruising in the Volga basin. The ship was built by Slovenské Lodenice at their shipyard in Komárno, Czechoslovakia, and entered service in 1981. At 3,950 tonnes, Semyon Budyonnyy is one of the world's biggest river cruise ships. Her sister ships are Valerian Kuybyshev, Fyodor Shalyapin, Feliks Dzerzhinskiy, Sergey Kuchkin, Mikhail Frunze, Mstislav Rostropovich, Aleksandr Suvorov and Georgiy Zhukov. Semyon Budyonnyy is currently owned and operated by Vodohod, a Russian river cruise line. Her home port is currently Nizhny Novgorod.

== Features ==
The ship has two restaurants: Ladoga and Onega, two bars, solarium, sauna and resting area.

== See also ==
- List of river cruise ships
