= Valerian Kuybyshev (ship) =

Valerian Kuybyshev-class river cruise ship

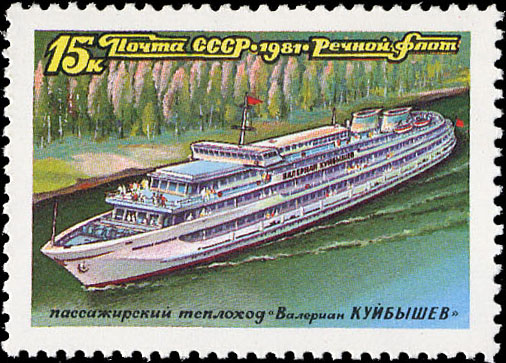
- Valerian Kuybyshev on the stamp issue of the USSR, 1981

History

Russia
- Name: Valerian Kuybyshev
- Owner: 1975–1994: Volga Shipping Company (ГП Волжское объединённое речное пароходство МРФ РСФСР); 1994–2012: Volga Shipping Company (ОАО Волжское пароходство); 2012–2018: Vodohod
- Operator: 1975–2012: Volga Shipping Company; 2012–2018: Vodohod
- Port of registry: 1975–1994: Gorky, Soviet Union; 1994–2018: Nizhny Novgorod, Russia
- Route: Saint Petersburg – Valaam
- Builder: Slovenské Lodenice, Komárno, Czechoslovakia
- Yard number: 2001
- Completed: 1 July 1975
- In service: 1976
- Identification: RRR number: 140655; MMSI number: 273365010
- Fate: Scrapped by Chkalovsk shipyard in 2018

General characteristics
- Class & type: Valerian Kuybyshev-class river cruise ship
- Tonnage: 6,308 GT; 550 DWT
- Displacement: 3,950 t
- Length: 135.75 m (445.4 ft)
- Beam: 16.8 m (55 ft)
- Draught: 2.9 m (9.5 ft)
- Decks: 5 (4 passenger accessible)
- Installed power: 3 x 6ЧРН36/45 (ЭГ70-5)2,208 kilowatts (2,961 hp)
- Propulsion: 3 propellers
- Speed: 26 km/h (16 mph; 14 kn)
- Capacity: 343 passengers
- Crew: 81

The Valerian Kuybyshev (Russian: Валериан Куйбышев) was a Valerian Kuybyshev-class (92-016, OL400) Soviet/Russian river cruise ship, cruising in the Volga – Neva basin. The ship was built by Slovenské Lodenice at their shipyard in Komárno, Czechoslovakia and entered service in 1976. She was named after prominent Soviet politician Valerian Kuybyshev. At 3,950 tonnes, Valerian Kuybyshev was one of the world's biggest river cruise ships. Her sister ships are Feliks Dzerzhinskiy, Mikhail Frunze, Fyodor Shalyapin, Sergey Kuchkin, Mstislav Rostropovich, Aleksandr Suvorov, Semyon Budyonnyy and Georgiy Zhukov. Valerian Kuybyshev was operated by Vodohod, the biggest Russian river cruise line.

She sailed under Russian flag, and her last home port was Nizhny Novgorod.

== Features ==
The ship had two restaurants, two bars, solarium, sauna and a resting area.

== See also ==
- List of river cruise ships
