= Feliks Dzerzhinskiy (ship) =

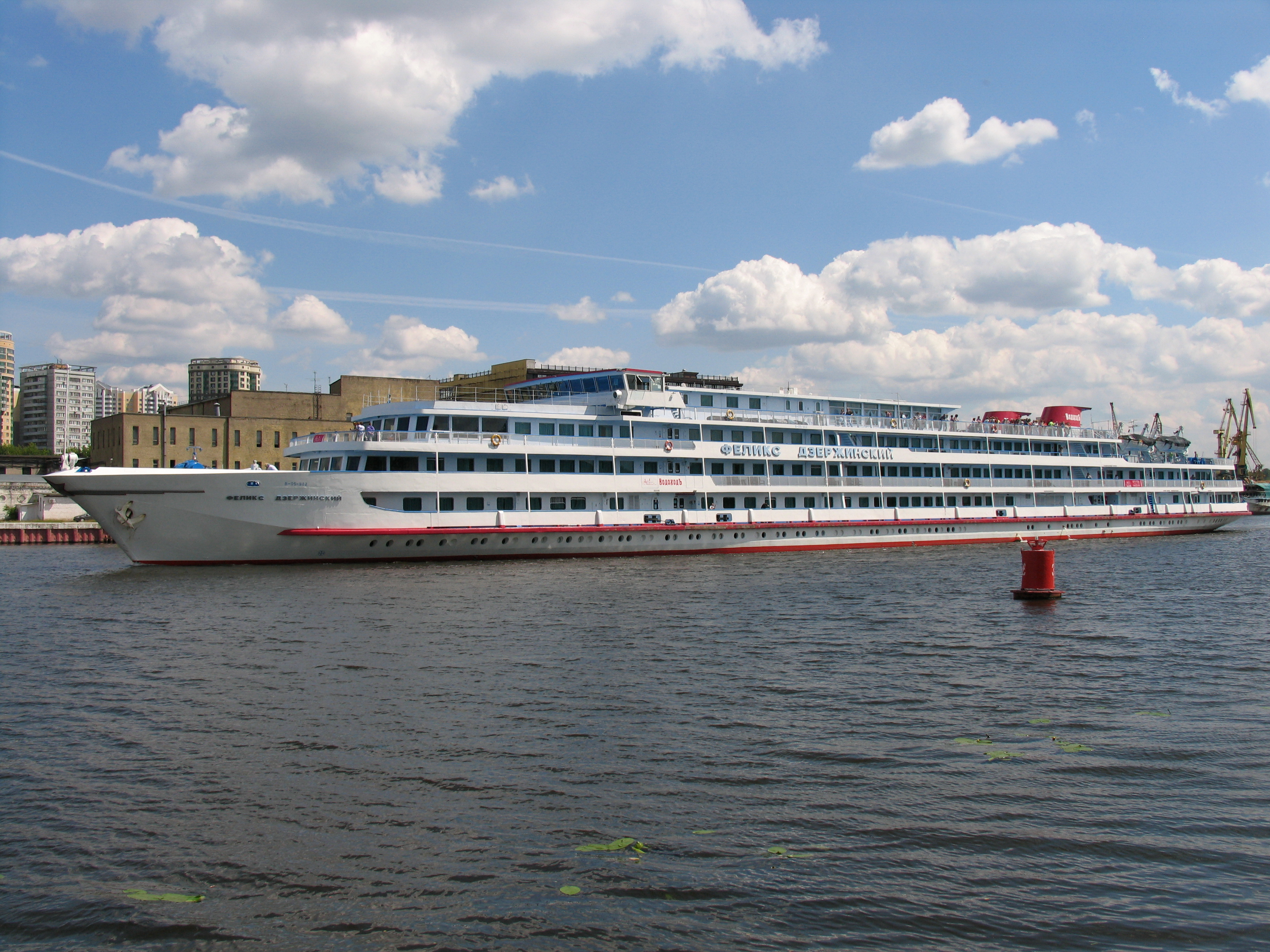
- Feliks Dzerzhinskiy on the Khimki Reservoir, in 2012

History
- Name: Feliks Dzerzhinskiy
- Owner: 1978–1994: Volga Shipping Company (ГП Волжское объединённое речное пароходство МРФ РСФСР); 1994–2012: Volga Shipping Company (ОАО Волжское пароходство); 2012: OOO V. F. Passazhirskiye Perevozki (ООО В. Ф. Пассажирские перевозки); 2012–present: Vodohod
- Operator: Volga Shipping Company; Vodohod
- Port of registry: 1977–1994: Gorky, Soviet Union; 1994–2012: Nizhny Novgorod, Russia
- Route: Moscow – Uglich, Moscow – Yaroslavl, Moscow – Nizhny Novgorod
- Builder: Slovenské Lodenice, Komárno, Czechoslovakia
- Yard number: 2003
- Completed: 1978
- In service: 1978
- Identification: RRR number: 140657; MMSI number: 273379080
- Status: In service

General characteristics
- Class & type: Valerian Kuybyshev-class river cruise ship
- Tonnage: 6,305 GT; 547 DWT
- Displacement: 3,895 t
- Length: 135.75 m (445.4 ft)
- Beam: 16.8 m (55 ft)
- Draught: 2.9 m (9.5 ft)
- Decks: 5 (4 passenger accessible)
- Installed power: 3 x 6ЧРН36/45 (ЭГ70-5)2,208 kilowatts (2,961 hp)
- Propulsion: 3 propellers
- Speed: 26 km/h (16 mph; 14 kn)
- Capacity: 373 passengers
- Crew: 85

The Feliks Dzerzhinskiy (Russian: Феликс Дзержинский) is a Valerian Kuybyshev-class (92-016, OL400) Soviet/Russian river cruise ship, cruising in the Volga basin. The ship was built by Slovenské Lodenice at their shipyard in Komárno, Czechoslovakia, and entered service in 1978. She was named after the Soviet statesman Felix Dzerzhinsky alias Iron Felix. At 3,935 tonnes, Feliks Dzerzhinskiy is one of the world's biggest river cruise ships. Her sister ships are Valerian Kuybyshev, Mikhail Frunze, Fyodor Shalyapin, Sergey Kuchkin, Mstislav Rostropovich, Aleksandr Suvorov, Semyon Budyonnyy and Georgiy Zhukov. Feliks Dzerzhinskiy is currently operated by Vodohod, a Russian river cruise line. Her home port is currently Nizhny Novgorod.

== Features ==
The ship has two restaurants, two bars, solarium and resting area.

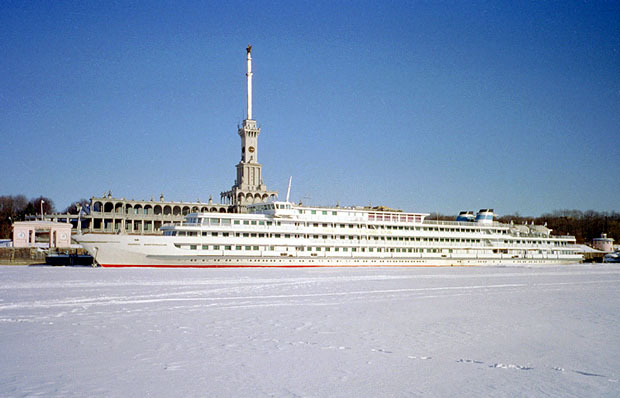
Feliks Dzerzhinskiy in Moscow, in winter 1999/2000

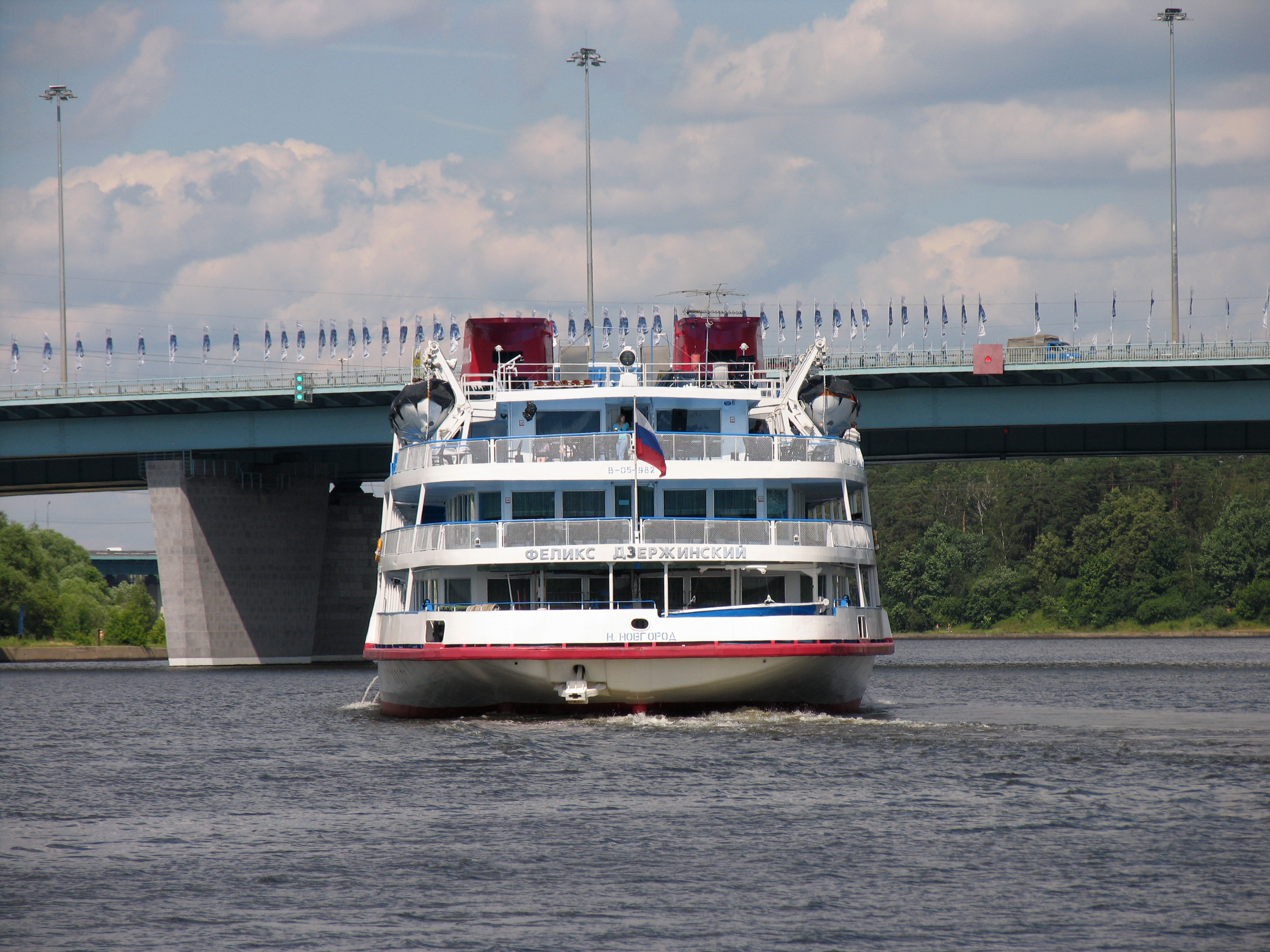
Stern view of the Feliks Dzerzhinskiy June 25, 2012

== See also ==
- List of river cruise ships
