= Valerian Kuybyshev-class motorship =

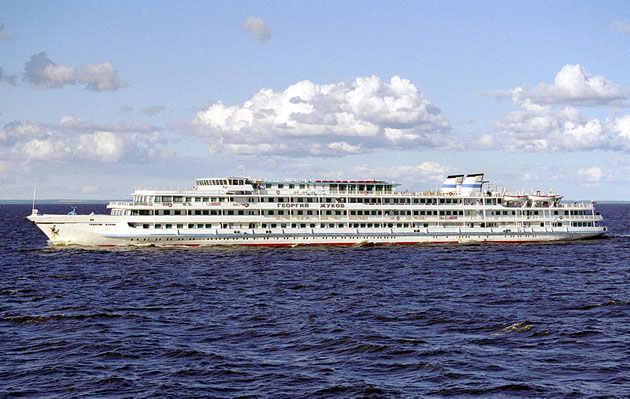
- River cruise ship Georgiy Zhukov

Class overview
- Builders: Slovenské Lodenice, Komárno, Czechoslovakia
- Operators: Vodohod
- In service: 1976
- Planned: 9
- Completed: 9
- Active: 7
- Retired: 2
- Preserved: 7

General characteristics
- Type: River cruise ship
- Tonnage: 6,308 GT
- Displacement: 3,950 t
- Length: 135.75 m (445.4 ft)
- Beam: 16.8 m (55 ft)
- Draught: 2.9 m (9.5 ft)
- Decks: 4 passenger decks
- Installed power: 3 × 6ЧРН36/45 (ЭГ70-5)2,208 kilowatts (2,961 hp)
- Propulsion: 3
- Speed: 26 km/h (16 mph; 14 kn)
- Capacity: 400 passengers

Valerian Kuybyshev class is a class of Russian river passenger ships. It got name after the first ship of class Valerian Kuybyshev.

Four-deck cruise ships manufactured in Komárno, Czechoslovakia, 1976–1983.

== River cruise ships of the project 92-016/OL400 ==
Valerian Kuybyshev-class motorships
No.	Original name	English transliteration
1	Валериан Куйбышев	Valerian Kuybyshev
2	Климент Ворошилов (Фёдор Шаляпин)	Kliment Voroshilov (Fyodor Shalyapin)
3	Феликс Дзержинский	Feliks Dzerzhinskiy
4	Георгий Димитров (Сергей Кучкин)	Georgiy Dimitrov (Sergey Kuchkin)
5	Михаил Фрунзе	Mikhail Frunze
6	Михаил Калинин (Мстислав Ростропович)	Mikhail Kalinin (Mstislav Rostropovich)
7	Александр Суворов	Aleksandr Suvorov
8	Семён Будённый	Semyon Budyonnyy
9	Георгий Жуков	Georgiy Zhukov

== Overview ==
Valerian Kuybyshev class
Month and year of build	Hull No	Image	Name	Customer	Port of registry	Status
December 1975	2001		Valerian Kuybyshev	Volga Shipping Company	Gorky → Nizhny Novgorod	RRR number: 140655; scrapped in 2018
1977	2002		Fyodor Shalyapin	Volga Shipping Company	Gorky → Nizhny Novgorod	originally, the Kliment Voroshilov, RRR number: 140656 scrapped in 2023
1978	2003		Feliks Dzerzhinskiy	Volga Shipping Company	Gorky → Nizhny Novgorod	RRR number: 140657
1979	2004		Sergey Kuchkin	Volga Shipping Company	Gorky → Nizhny Novgorod	originally, the Georgiy Dimitrov, RRR number: 140658
April 1980	2005		Mikhail Frunze	Volga Shipping Company	Gorky → Nizhny Novgorod	RRR number: 140659
1981	2006		Mstislav Rostropovich	Volga Shipping Company	Gorky → Nizhny Novgorod	originally, the Mikhail Kalinin, RRR number: 140660
1981	2007		Aleksandr Suvorov	Volga Shipping Company	Rostov-on-Don → Gorky → Nizhny Novgorod	RRR number: 140661
1981	2008		Semyon Budyonnyy	Volga Shipping Company	Gorky → Nizhny Novgorod	RRR number: 140662
April 1983	2009		Georgiy Zhukov	Volga Shipping Company	Gorky → Nizhny Novgorod	RRR number: 140663

== See also ==
- List of river cruise ships
- Rossiya-class motorship (1952)
- Rossiya-class motorship (1973)
- Dmitriy Furmanov-class motorship
- Baykal-class motorship
- Anton Chekhov-class motorship
- Sergey Yesenin-class motorship
- Oktyabrskaya Revolyutsiya-class motorship
- Ukraina-class motorship
- Dunay-class motorship
- Rodina-class motorship
- Vladimir Ilyich-class motorship
- Maksim Gorkiy-class motorship
