= Sergey Kuchkin (ship) =

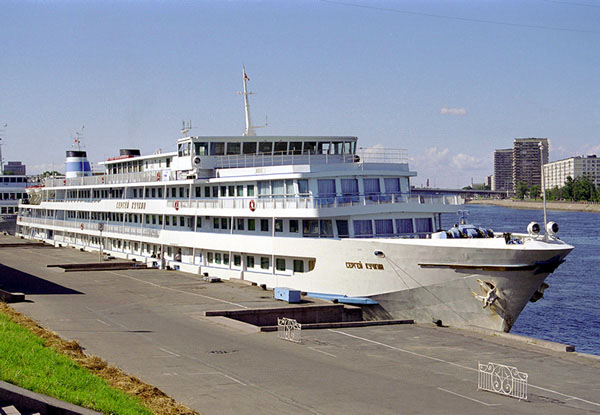
- Sergey Kuchkin at pier in Saint Petersburg, in 2001

History
- Name: Sergey Kuchkin: 2000–present; Georgiy Dimitrov: 1979–2000
- Owner: 1979–1994: Volga Shipping Company (ГП Волжское объединённое речное пароходство МРФ РСФСР); 1994–2014: Volga Shipping Company (ОАО Волжское пароходство)
- Operator: Volga Shipping Company; Vodohod
- Port of registry: 1979–1994: Gorky, Soviet Union; 1994–2012: Nizhny Novgorod, Russia
- Route: Kazan – Samara, Kazan – Yaroslavl, Kazan – Volgograd, Kazan – Astrakhan, Kazan – Saint Petersburg
- Builder: Slovenské Lodenice, Komárno, Czechoslovakia
- Yard number: 2004
- Completed: 1979
- In service: 1979
- Identification: Call sign: UAIF2; RRR number: 140658; MMSI number: 273364090
- Status: In service

General characteristics
- Class & type: Valerian Kuybyshev-class river cruise ship
- Tonnage: 6,338 GT; 602 DWT
- Displacement: 3,950 t
- Length: 135.75 m (445.4 ft)
- Beam: 16.8 m (55 ft)
- Draught: 2.9 m (9.5 ft)
- Decks: 5 (4 passenger accessible)
- Installed power: 3 x 6ЧРН36/45 (ЭГ70-5)2,208 kilowatts (2,961 hp)
- Propulsion: 3 propellers
- Speed: 26 km/h (16 mph; 14 kn)
- Capacity: 299 passengers
- Crew: 103

Sergey Kuchkin (Russian: Серге́й Кучкин) (former Georgiy Dimitrov) is a Valerian Kuybyshev-class (92-016, OL400) Soviet/Russian river cruise ship, cruising in the Volga basin. The ship was built by Slovenské Lodenice at their shipyard in Komárno, Czechoslovakia, and entered service in 1979. At 3,950 tonnes, Sergey Kuchkin is one of the world's biggest river cruise ships. Her sister ships are Valerian Kuybyshev, Mikhail Frunze, Feliks Dzerzhinskiy, Fyodor Shalyapin, Mstislav Rostropovich, Aleksandr Suvorov, Semyon Budyonnyy and Georgiy Zhukov. Sergey Kuchkin is currently operated by Vodohod, a Russian river cruise line. Her home port is currently Nizhny Novgorod.

== Features ==
The ship has two restaurants, three bars, solarium, sauna and resting area.

== See also ==
- List of river cruise ships
