= Mstislav Rostropovich (ship) =

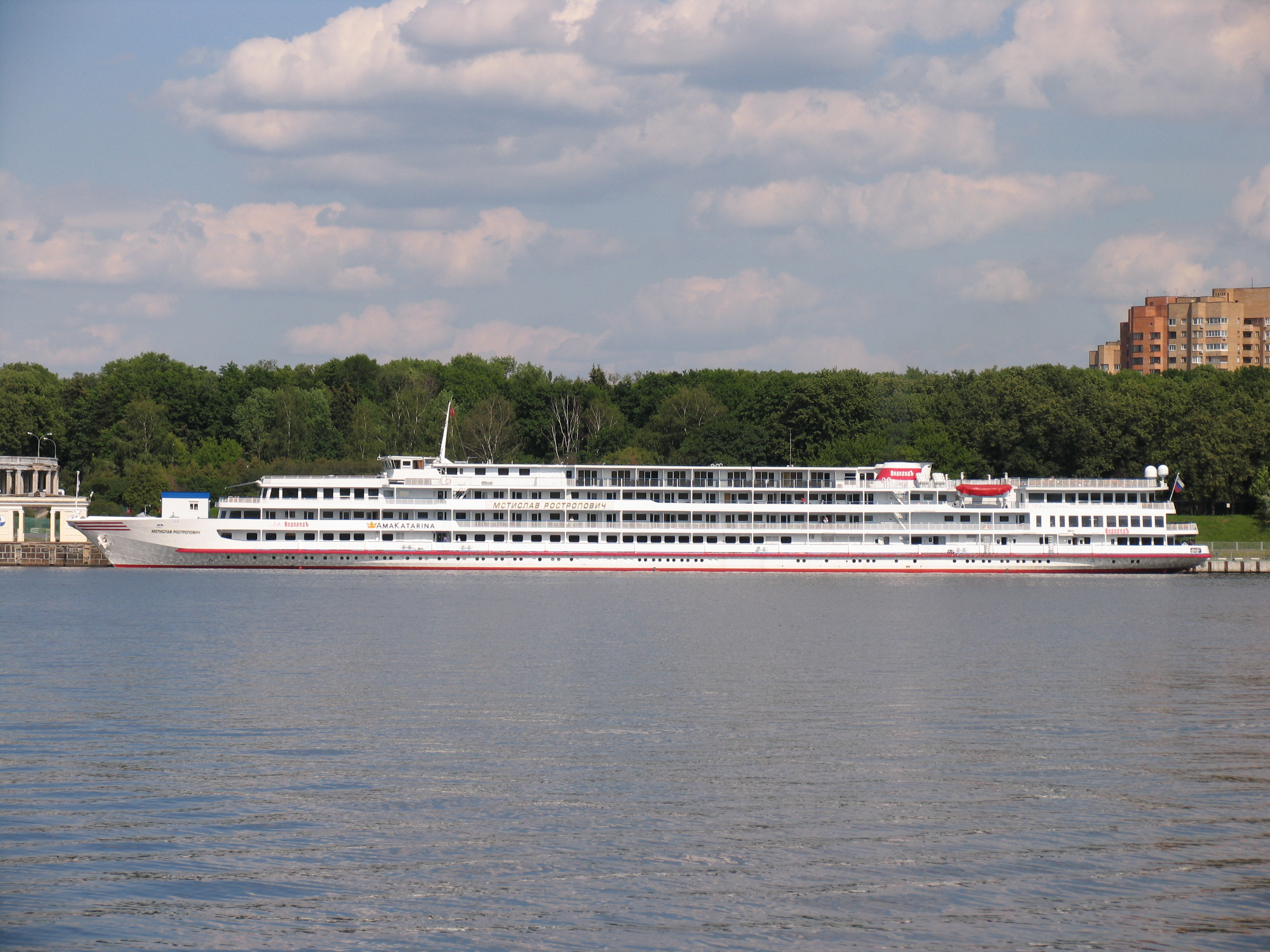
- Mstislav Rostropovich at the Northern River Terminal in Moscow, in 2012

History
- Name: Mstislav Rostropovich: 2011–present; Mikhail Kalinin: 1981–2011
- Owner: 1981–1994: Volga Shipping Company (ГП Волжское объединённое речное пароходство МРФ РСФСР); 1994–2012: Volga Shipping Company (ОАО Волжское пароходство); 2012: OOO V. F. Passazhirskiye Perevozki (ООО В.Ф. Пассажирские перевозки); 2012–present: Vodohod
- Operator: Volga Shipping Company; Vodohod
- Port of registry: 1981–1994: Gorky, Soviet Union; 1994–2014: Nizhny Novgorod, Russia
- Route: Moscow – Uglich, Moscow – Yaroslavl, Moscow – Tver, Moscow – Saint Petersburg
- Builder: Slovenské Lodenice, Komárno, Czechoslovakia
- Yard number: 2006
- Completed: 1981
- In service: 1981
- Identification: RRR number: 140660; MMSI number: 273361020
- Status: In service

General characteristics
- Class & type: Valerian Kuybyshev class River cruise ship
- Tonnage: 6,679 GT; 605 DWT
- Displacement: 3,953 t
- Length: 135.75 m (445.4 ft)
- Beam: 16.8 m (55 ft)
- Draught: 2.9 m (9.5 ft)
- Decks: 5 (4 passenger accessible)
- Installed power: 3 x 6ЧРН36/45 (ЭГ70-5)2,208 kilowatts (2,961 hp)
- Propulsion: 3 propellers
- Speed: 26 km/h (16 mph; 14 kn)
- Capacity: 223 passengers
- Crew: 100

The Mstislav Rostropovich (Russian: Мстислав Ростропович) (former Mikhail Kalinin) is a Valerian Kuybyshev-class (92-016, OL400) Soviet/Russian river cruise ship, cruising in the Volga basin. The ship was built by Slovenské Lodenice at their shipyard in Komárno, Czechoslovakia, and entered service in 1981. At 3,953 tonnes, Mstislav Rostropovich is one of the world's biggest river cruise ships. Her sister ships are Valerian Kuybyshev, Mikhail Frunze, Feliks Dzerzhinskiy, Fyodor Shalyapin, Sergey Kuchkin, Aleksandr Suvorov, Semyon Budyonnyy and Georgiy Zhukov. Mstislav Rostropovich is currently owned by Vodohod and operated by Vodohod for foreign tourists. Her home port is currently Nizhny Novgorod.

== Features ==
Mstislav Rostropovich is the first Vodohod four-star cruise vessel. After reconstruction in 2008–2011 all rooms are equipped with automatic climate control system. The ship has two restaurants, three bars, solarium, sauna and resting area.

== See also ==
- List of river cruise ships
