= Rodina-class motorship =

Class of Russian river passenger ships

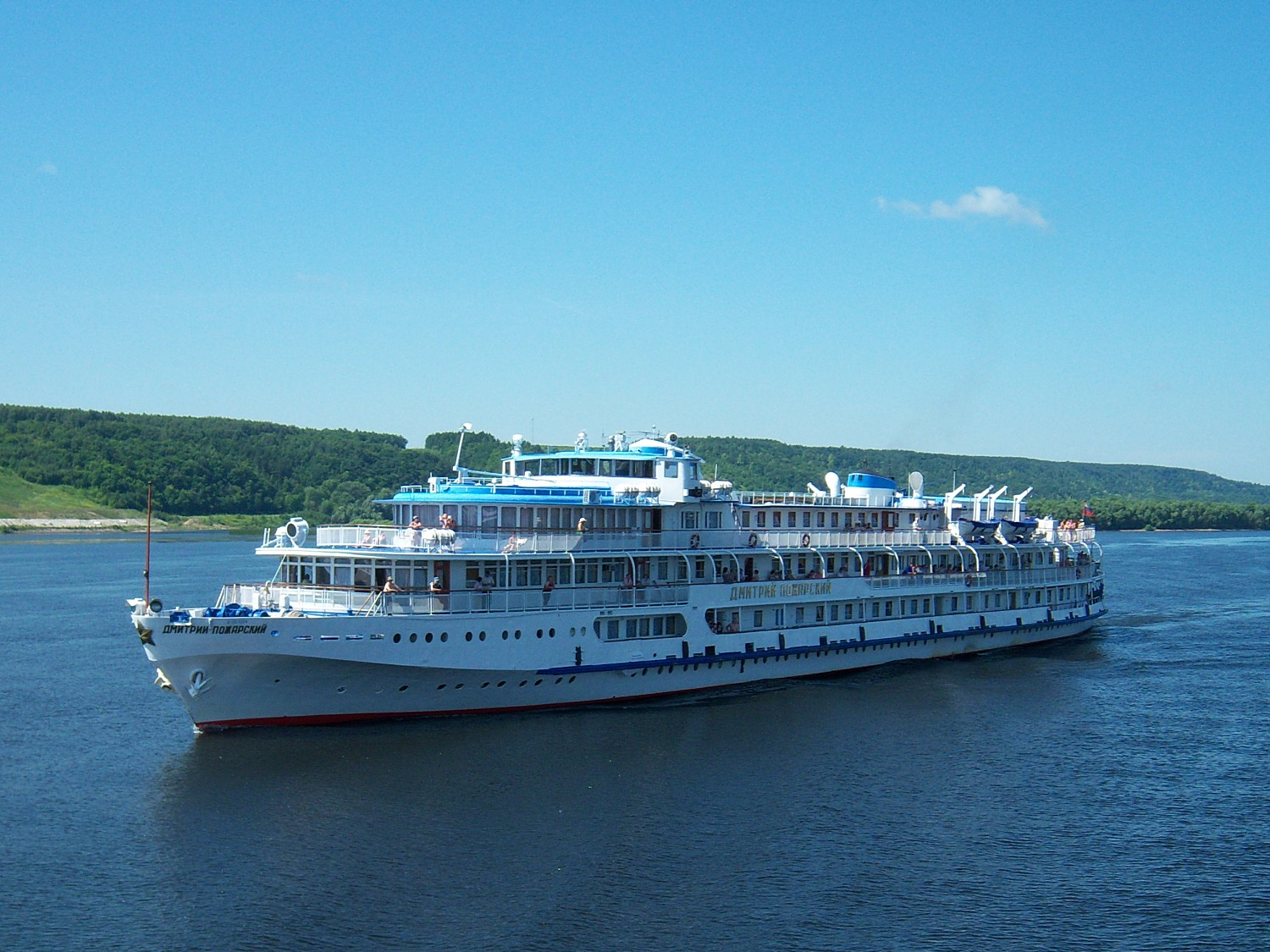
- Cruise ship Dmitriy Pozharskiy

Class overview
- Name: Rodina class
- Built: 1954–1961
- Planned: 49
- Completed: 49

General characteristics
- Type: Passenger ship
- Displacement: 1.460 t (I), 1.492 t (II without refrigerator) and 1.506 t (II)
- Length: 95.8 m (314 ft)
- Beam: 14.3 m (47 ft)
- Draught: 2.4 m (7.9 ft)

The Rodina class is a class of Russian river passenger ships. "Rodina" means "motherland" in Russian.

They were three-deck cargo-passenger ships manufactured in Germany from 1954 to 1961.

== River passenger ships of the project 588 ==
Rodina-class motorships
No.	Original name	English transliteration
First series of Project 588
1	В. Чкалов	V. Chkalov
2	А. Матросов	A. Matrosov
3	Н. Гастелло (Алексей Толстой)	N. Gastello (Aleksey Tolstoy)
4	Л. Доватор (Арабелла)	L. Dovator (Arabella)
5	Родина (Святая Русь)	Rodina (Svyataya Rus)
6	Эрнст Тельман (Цезарь)	Ernst Telman (Tsezar)
7	Андрей Вышинский (Тарас Шевченко, Сергей Кучкин, Тарас Шевченко, Очарованный Странник)	Andrey Vyshinskiy (Taras Shevchenko, Sergey Kuchkin, Taras Shevchenko, Ocharovannyy Strannik)
8	Фридрих Энгельс	Fridrikh Engels
9	И. А. Крылов	I. A. Krylov
10	Карл Либкнехт (Юрий Никулин, Солнечный Город)	Karl Libknekht (Yuriy Nikulin, Solnechnyy Gorod)
11	Ильич	Ilyich
Second series of Project 588
12	Александр Невский	Aleksandr Nevskiy
13	Карл Маркс (Северная Сказка)	Karl Marks (Severnaya Skazka)
14	Дмитрий Донской (Кабаргинъ, Кабаргин, Князь Донской)	Dmitriy Donskoy (Kabargin, Knyaz Donskoy)
15	Михаил Кутузов	Mikhail Kutuzov
16	Дмитрий Пожарский	Dmitriy Pozharskiy
17	Рылеев	Ryleev
18	Алеша Попович or Алеша Попович	Alesha Popovich or Alyosha Popovich
19	Добрыня Никитич (Прикамье)	Dobrynya Nikitich (Prikamye)
20	Илья Муромец	Ilya Muromets
21	Багратион	Bagration
22	Кавказ (Космонавт Гагарин)	Kavkaz (Kosmonavt Gagarin)
23	Казбек (Михаил Лермонтов)	Kazbek (Mikhail Lermontov)
24	Эльбрус (Валентина Терешкова)	Elbrus (Valentina Tereshkova)
25	Алтай	Altay
26	Урал (Инженер Пташников, Тарас Бульба, Урал)	Ural (Inzhener Ptashnikov, Taras Bulba, Ural)
27	Н. В. Гоголь	N. V. Gogol
28	А. И. Герцен	A. I. Gertsen
29	Т. Г. Шевченко (Святой Петр, Anichka)	T. G. Shevchenko (Svyatoy Petr, Anichka)
30	И. С. Тургенев	I. S. Turgenev
31	Г. В. Плеханов	G. V. Plekhanov
32	К. А. Тимирязев	K. A. Timiryazev
33	Денис Давыдов	Denis Davydov
34	Иван Сусанин (Петр Первый)	Ivan Susanin (Pyotr Pervyy)
35	Серго Орджоникидзе (Орджоникидзе, Серго Орджоникидзе)	Sergo Ordzhonikidze (Ordzhonikidze, Sergo Ordzhonikidze)
36	Козьма Минин	Kozyma Minin
37	Степан Разин (Аврора)	Stepan Razin (Avrora)
38	Юрий Долгорукий	Yuriy Dolgorukiy
39	Генерал И. Д. Черняховский	General I. D. Chernyakhovskiy
40	Генерал Н. Ф. Ватутин (Русь Великая)	General N. F. Vatutin (Rus Velikaya)
41	Вильгельм Пик (Павел Бажов)	Vilgelm Pik (Pavel Bazhov)
42	А. С. Попов	A. S. Popov
43	Н. К. Крупская (Петрокрепость)	N. K. Krupskaya (Petrokrepost)
44	К. Э. Циолковский (Анатолий Папанов, Две Столицы)	K. E. Tsiolkovskiy (Anatoliy Papanov, Dve Stolitsy)
45	Ф. Жолио-Кюри	F. Zholio-Kyuri
46	Ф. И. Панфёров	F. I. Panfyorov
47	Фёдор Гладков	Fyodor Gladkov
48	Александр Фадеев	Aleksandr Fadeyev
49	Хирург Разумовский	Khirurg Razumovskiy

== Overview ==
Rodina class
Month and year of build	Hull No	Image	Name	Operator	Flag	RRR	MMSI	Status
March 1954	13001		Valeriy Chkalov	YRSCO, Krasnoyarsk	(Soviet Union) → (Russia)	142501	273327780	originally, the V. Chkalov (also called Valeriy Chkalov according to marinetraffic and the newest edit of RRR). This ship was modernised in 2007.
June 1954	13002		A. Matrosov	YRSCO, Krasnoyarsk	(Soviet Union) → (Russia)	142502	273353470	originally, the A. Matrosov (Aleksandr Matrosov is the marinetraffic name)
September 1954	13003		Aleksey Tolstoy	VURSCO, Gorky	(Soviet Union) → (Russia)	142503	273338640	originally, the N. Gastello; rebuilt, built up one deck; scrapped in 2014
April 1955	13004		Arabella	VURSCO, Gorky	(Soviet Union) → (Russia)	142504	–	originally, the L. Dovator (until 2002); rebuilt, picked up 76 people from sunken Bulgariya on July 10, 2011, scrapped in 2014
June 1955	13005		Svyataya Rus	VURSCO, Gorky	(Soviet Union) → (Russia)	142505	–	originally, the Rodina (until 2006); burnt at Bor on 13 August 2018, decommissioned in 2018
1955	13006		Tsezar	VURSCO, Gorky	(Soviet Union) → (Russia)	142506	273328160	originally, the Ernst Telman
April 1956	11000		Ocharovannyy Strannik	VURSCO, Gorky	(Soviet Union) → (Russia)	142507	273371180	originally, the Andrey Vyshinskiy, Taras Shevchenko, Sergey Kuchkin, Taras Shevchenko
June 1956	11001	Image	Fridrikh Engels	VURSCO, Gorky	(Soviet Union) → (Russia)	142508	–	sank on November 6, 2003, out of service in November 2003
September 1956	11002		I. A. Krylov	VURSCO, Gorky	(Soviet Union) → (Russia)	142509	273364210	
November 1956	11003		Solnechnyy Gorod	VURSCO, Gorky	(Soviet Union) → (Russia)	142510	273326640	originally, the Karl Libknekht, Y. Nikulin (2002–2014)
December 1956	11004	Image	Ilyich	VURSCO, Gorky	(Soviet Union) → (Russia)	142577	–	Flotel at Kineshma since 2006
April 1957	112		Aleksandr Nevskiy	VURSCO, Gorky	(Soviet Union) → (Russia)	142578	273362080	
May 1957	113		Severnaya Skazka	VURSCO, Gorky	(Soviet Union) → (Russia)	142579	273379430	originally, the Karl Marks
June 1957	114		Knyaz Donskoy	VURSCO, Gorky	(Soviet Union) → (Russia)	142580	–	originally, the Dmitriy Donskoy, Kabargin', Kabargin; scrapped
1957	115		Mikhail Kutuzov	VURSCO, Gorky	(Soviet Union) → (Russia)	142581	273338050	
August 1957	116		Dmitriy Pozharskiy	VURSCO, Gorky	(Soviet Union) → (Russia)	142582	273341660	
November 1957	117		Ryleev	VURSCO, Gorky	(Soviet Union) → (Russia)	082244	–	scrapped in 2018
December 1957	118		Alyosha Popovich	VURSCO, Gorky	(Soviet Union) → (Russia)	082169	–	scrapped in November 2014
December 1957	119		Prikamye	VURSCO, Gorky	(Soviet Union) → (Russia)	082167	–	originally, the Dobrynya Nikitich
March 1958	120		Ilya Muromets	VURSCO, Gorky	(Soviet Union) → (Russia)	082168	273362870	
April 1958	121		Bagration	VURSCO, Gorky	(Soviet Union) → (Russia)	082169	–	out of service in October 1999; scrapped in 2003
May 1958	122		Kosmonavt Gagarin	VURSCO, Gorky	(Soviet Union) → (Russia)	082170	273338860	originally, the Kavkaz (1958–1961); rebuilt 2005 and 2008
June 1958	123	Image	Ural	VSCO, Astrakhan	(Soviet Union) → (Russia)	004875	273321730	originally, the Ural, Inzhener Ptashnikov, Taras Bulba
October 1958	124		Valentina Tereshkova	VSCO, Astrakhan	(Soviet Union)	–	–	*originally, the Elbrus (until 1963); filmed in „Девичья весна“ 1960; burnt, out of service and scrapped 1978 at Astrakhan
November 1958	125	Image	Altay	NWRSCO, Leningrad	(Soviet Union)	–	–	filmed in „Unbelievable Adventures of Italians in Russia“ in 1973; sold to Baltic states; scrapped in the 1990s
December 1958	126		Mikhail Lermontov	VURSCO, Astrakhan	(Soviet Union) → (Russia)	–	–	originally, the Kazbek; out of service in July 1998; scrapped 2003
March 1959	127		N. V. Gogol	VURSCO, Gorky	(Soviet Union) → (Russia)	082649	273367160	RR 4018
April 1959	128	Image	A. I. Gertsen	VURSCO, Gorky	(Soviet Union) → (Russia)	082650	273337560	
May 1959	129		Anichka	NWRSCO, Leningrad	(Soviet Union) → (Russia) → (Republic of Ireland)	–	–	originally, the T. G. Shevtshenko (until 1994), Svyatoy Petr (1994–1997); sunk at Sligo, Ireland; out of service in 2003
June 1959	130	Image	I. S. Turgenev	VURSCO, Gorky	(Soviet Union) → (Russia)	083028	–	scrapped in 2017
August 1959	131		G. V. Plekhanov	VURSCO, Gorky	(Soviet Union) → (Russia)	082519	–	scrapped in 2020
September 1959	132	Image	K. A. Timiryazev	VURSCO, Astrakhan	(Soviet Union) → (Russia)	091176	–	
December 1959	133	Image	Denis Davydov	VURSCO, Astrakhan	(Soviet Union) → (Russia)	027620	–	
February 1960	134		Petr Pervyy	MRSCO, Moscow	(Soviet Union) → (Russia)	129230	–	originally, the Ivan Susanin (until 1992); 1992—2004 on the Maas River, in the Netherlands
March 1960	135	Image	Sergo Ordzhonikidze	MRSCO, Moskau	(Soviet Union)	129231	–	originally, the Sergo Ordzhonikidze, Ordzhonikidze; burnt in 1992 on the Lake Onega; filmed in "Titanic" of the band "Nautilus Pompilius" in 1994; out of service in 1995 and scrapped in 1996
April 1960	136	Image	Kozma Minin	VURSCO, Gorky	(Soviet Union) → (Russia)	027610	273354550	
August 1960	137		Avrora	VURSCO, Gorky	(Soviet Union) → (Russia)	021959	–	originally, the Stepan Razin (until 2003); scrapped
October 1960	138		Y. Dolgorukiy	VURSCO, Gorky	(Soviet Union) → (Russia)	083722	–	out of service in 2012, scrapped
November 1960	139	Image	General I. D. Chernyakhovskiy	VURSCO, Gorky	(Soviet Union) → (Russia)	041021	–	
December 1960	140		Rus Velikaya	VURSCO, Gorky	(Soviet Union) → (Russia)	229434	273356650	originally, the General N. F. Vatutin (until 2011)
January 1961	141	Image	Pavel Bazhov	KRSCO, Perm	(Soviet Union) → (Russia)	145001	–	originally, the Vilgelm Pik (until 1992)
April 1961	142		A. S. Popov	NWRSCO, Leningrad	(Soviet Union) → (Russia)	145002	273322950	
July 1961	143		Petrokrepost	NWRSCO, Leningrad	(Soviet Union) → (Russia)	145003		originally, the N. K. Krupskaya (until 1993); scrapped in 2012
August 1961	144		Dve Stolitsy	BORSCO, Petrozavodsk	(Soviet Union) → (Russia)	145004	273341750	originally, the K. E. Tsiolkovskiy, Anatoliy Papanov; accident in 1996 off Valaam, sank due to fire on board at Quay in Saint Petersburg in 2001; rebuilt
September 1961	145	Image	F. Zholio-Kyuri	KRSCO, Perm	(Soviet Union) → (Russia)	145005	–	burnt in October 2011 in the river’s backwater
October 1961	146		F. I. Panfyorov	KRSCO, Perm	(Soviet Union) → (Russia)	145006	273326520	rebuilt, built up one deck
November 1961	147	Image	Fedor Gladkov	KRSCO, Perm	(Soviet Union) → (Russia)	145007	–	
December 1961	148		Aleksandr Fadeyev	KRSCO, Perm	(Soviet Union) → (Russia)	145008	273369310	
December 1961	149		Khirurg Razumovskiy	KRSCO, Perm	(Soviet Union) → (Russia)	145009	273360410	rebuilt, built up one deck

RRR — Russian River Register

YRSCO – Yenisseiskoye Rechnoye Parokhodstvo; VURSCO – Volzhskoye Obyedinyonnoye Rechnoye Parokhodstvo (today – Volzhskoye Parokhodstvo, VSCO); MRSCO – Moskovskoye Rechnoye Parokhodstvo; KRSCO – Kamskoye Rechnoye Parokhodstvo; BORSCO – Belomoro-Onezhskoye Rechnoye Parokhodstvo; NWRSCO – Severo-Zapadnoye Rechnoye Parokhodstvo

== See also ==
- Anton Chekhov-class motorship
- Baykal-class motorship
- Dmitriy Furmanov-class motorship
- List of river cruise ships
- Oktyabrskaya Revolyutsiya-class motorship
- Rossiya-class motorship (1952)
- Rossiya-class motorship (1973)
- Sergey Yesenin-class motorship
- Valerian Kuybyshev-class motorship
- Yerofey Khabarov-class motorship
