= Maksim Gorkiy (1974) =

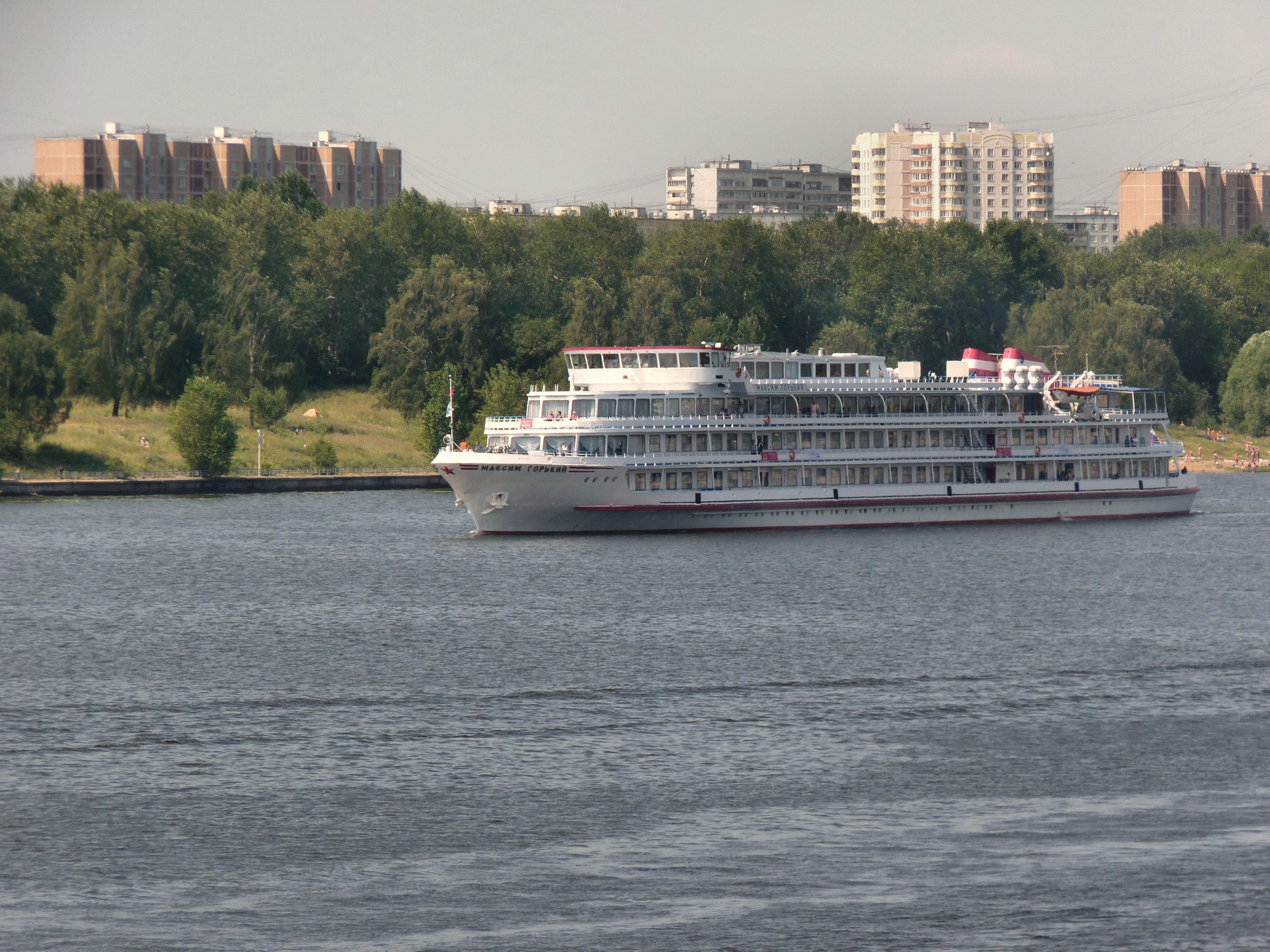
- Maksim Gorkiy on the Moscow Canal on 6 July 2010

History
- Name: Maksim Gorkiy
- Owner: 1974–1994: Volga Shipping Company (ГП Волжское объединённое речное пароходство МРФ РСФСР); 1994–2012: Volga Shipping Company (ОАО Волжское пароходство); 2012: OOO V. F. Passazhirskiye Perevozki (ООО В.Ф. Пассажирские перевозки); 2012-Present: Vodohod
- Operator: Volga Shipping Company; Vodohod
- Port of registry: 1974–1994: Gorky, Soviet Union; 1994–: Nizhny Novgorod, Russia
- Builder: Österreichische Schiffswerften AG, Korneuburg, Austria
- Yard number: K704
- Completed: April 1974
- In service: 1974
- Identification: RRR Number: 019376; MMSI number: 997799990
- Status: In service

General characteristics
- Class & type: Maksim Gorkiy-class river cruise ship
- Displacement: 2,099 t
- Length: 110.1 m (361 ft 3 in)
- Beam: 14.5 m (47 ft 7 in)
- Draught: 2.2 m (7 ft 3 in)
- Decks: 5 (4 passenger accessible)
- Installed power: 2 × 6ЧРН36/45 (Г60)1,352 kilowatts (1,813 hp)
- Propulsion: 2 propellers
- Speed: 22 km/h (14 mph; 12 kn)
- Capacity: 182 passengers (all berths)
- Crew: 66

Maksim Gorkiy (Russian: Максим Горький) is a Maksim Gorkiy-class (Q-040) Soviet/Russian river cruise ship, cruising in the Volga – Neva basin. The ship was built by Österreichische Schiffswerften AG at their shipyard in Korneuburg, Austria, and entered service in 1974. Maksim Gorkiy is the most comfortable river cruise ship currently in service with Vodohod. Her sister ship is Aleksandr Pushkin. Her home port is currently Nizhny Novgorod.

== See also ==
- List of river cruise ships
