= Mikhail Frunze (ship) =

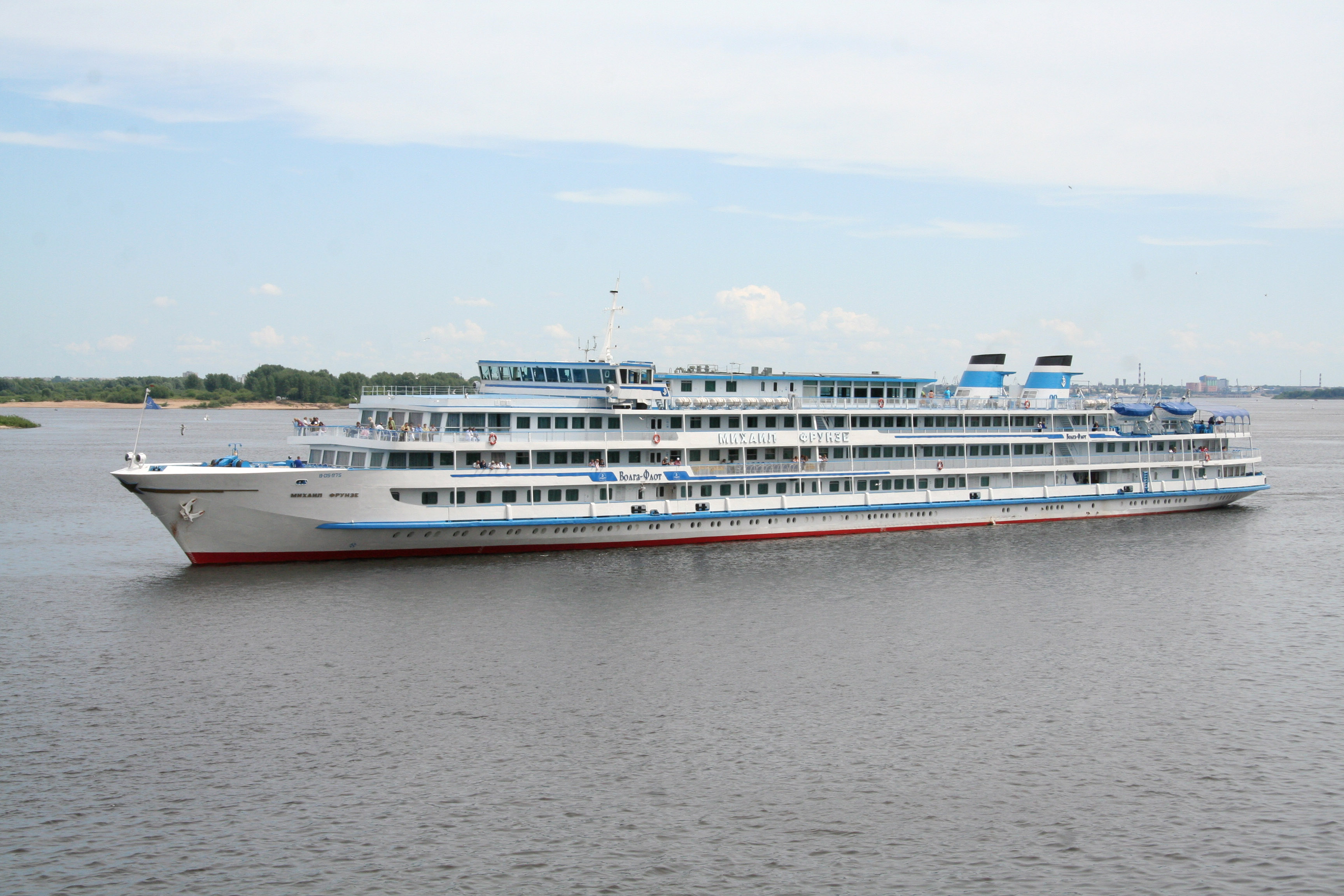
- Mikhail Frunze on the Volga River near Nizhni Novgorod

History
- Name: Mikhail Frunze
- Owner: 1980–1994: Volga Shipping Company (ГП Волжское объединённое речное пароходство МРФ РСФСР); 1994–2012: Volga Shipping Company (ОАО Волжское пароходство); 2012: OOO V. F. Passazhirskiye Perevozki (ООО В.Ф. Пассажирские перевозки); 2012-Present: Vodohod
- Operator: Volga Shipping Company; Volga–Flot–Tur; Vodohod
- Port of registry: 1980–1994: Gorky, Soviet Union; 1994–2014: Nizhny Novgorod, Russia
- Builder: Slovenské Lodenice, Komárno, Czechoslovakia
- Yard number: 2005
- Completed: April 1980
- In service: 1980
- Identification: RRR Number:140659; MMSI number: 273355150
- Status: In service

General characteristics
- Class & type: Valerian Kuybyshev-class river cruise ship
- Tonnage: 6,301 GT; 550 DWT
- Displacement: 4,050 t
- Length: 135.7 m (445 ft)
- Beam: 16.8 m (55 ft)
- Draught: 2.9 m (9.5 ft)
- Decks: 5 (4 passenger accessible)
- Installed power: 3 x 6ЧРН36/45 (ЭГ70-5)2,208 kilowatts (2,961 hp)
- Propulsion: 3 propellers
- Speed: 26 km/h (16 mph; 14 kn)
- Capacity: 382 passengers
- Crew: 85

The Mikhail Frunze (Russian: Михаил Фрунзе) is a Valerian Kuybyshev-class (92-016, OL400) Soviet/Russian river cruise ship, cruising in the Volga – Kama – Neva basin. The ship was built by Slovenské Lodenice at their shipyard in Komárno, Czechoslovakia, and entered service in 1980. At 4,050 tonnes, Mikhail Frunze is one of the biggest river cruise ships currently in service with Vodohod. Her sister ships are Valerian Kuybyshev, Fyodor Shalyapin, Feliks Dzerzhinskiy, Sergey Kuchkin, Mstislav Rostropovich, Aleksandr Suvorov, Semyon Budyonnyy and Georgiy Zhukov. Her home port is currently Nizhny Novgorod.

== Features ==
The ship has two restaurants, two bars, solarium, sauna and resting area.

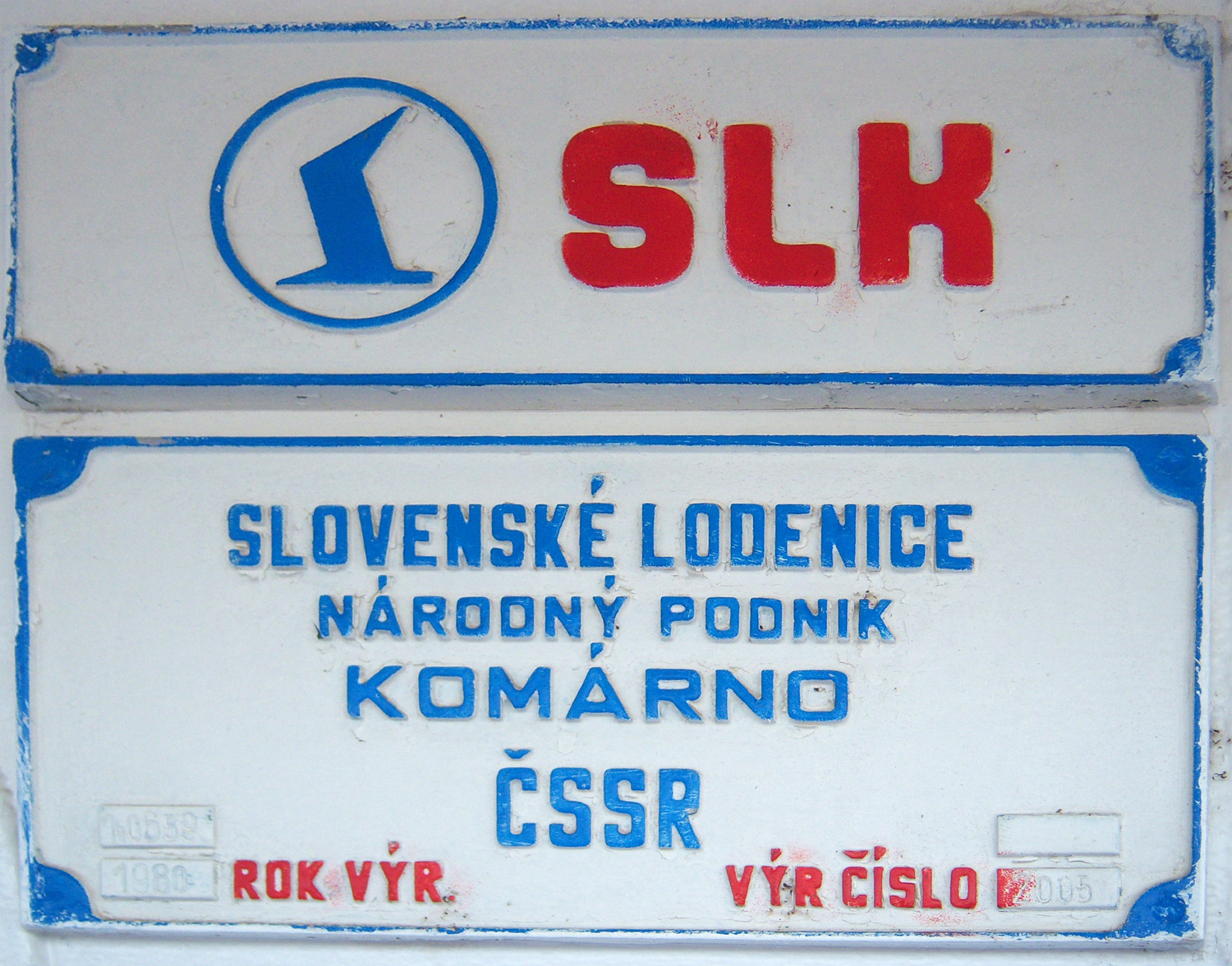
Shipyard number 2005

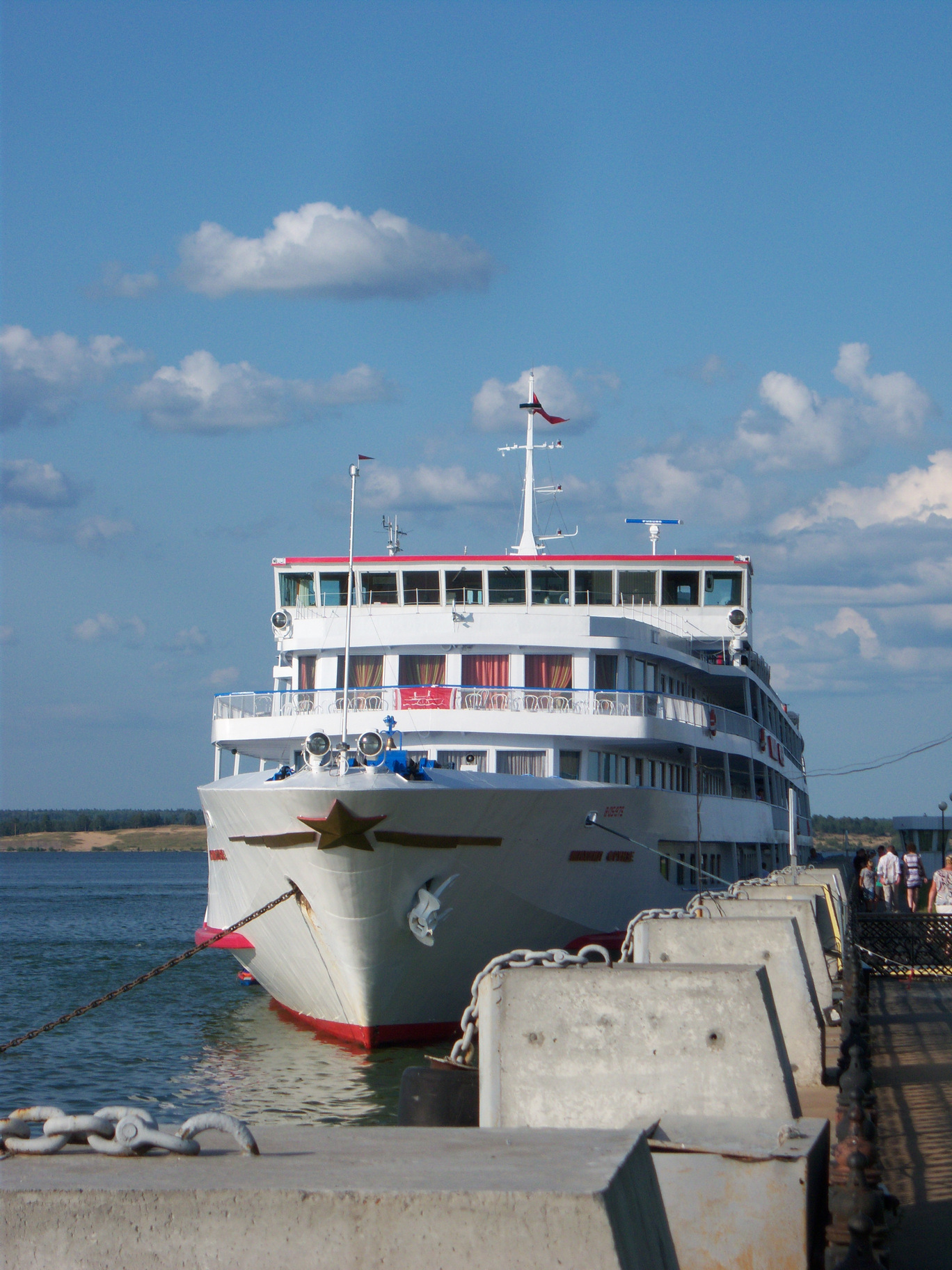
A view of the bow of the Mikhail Frunze

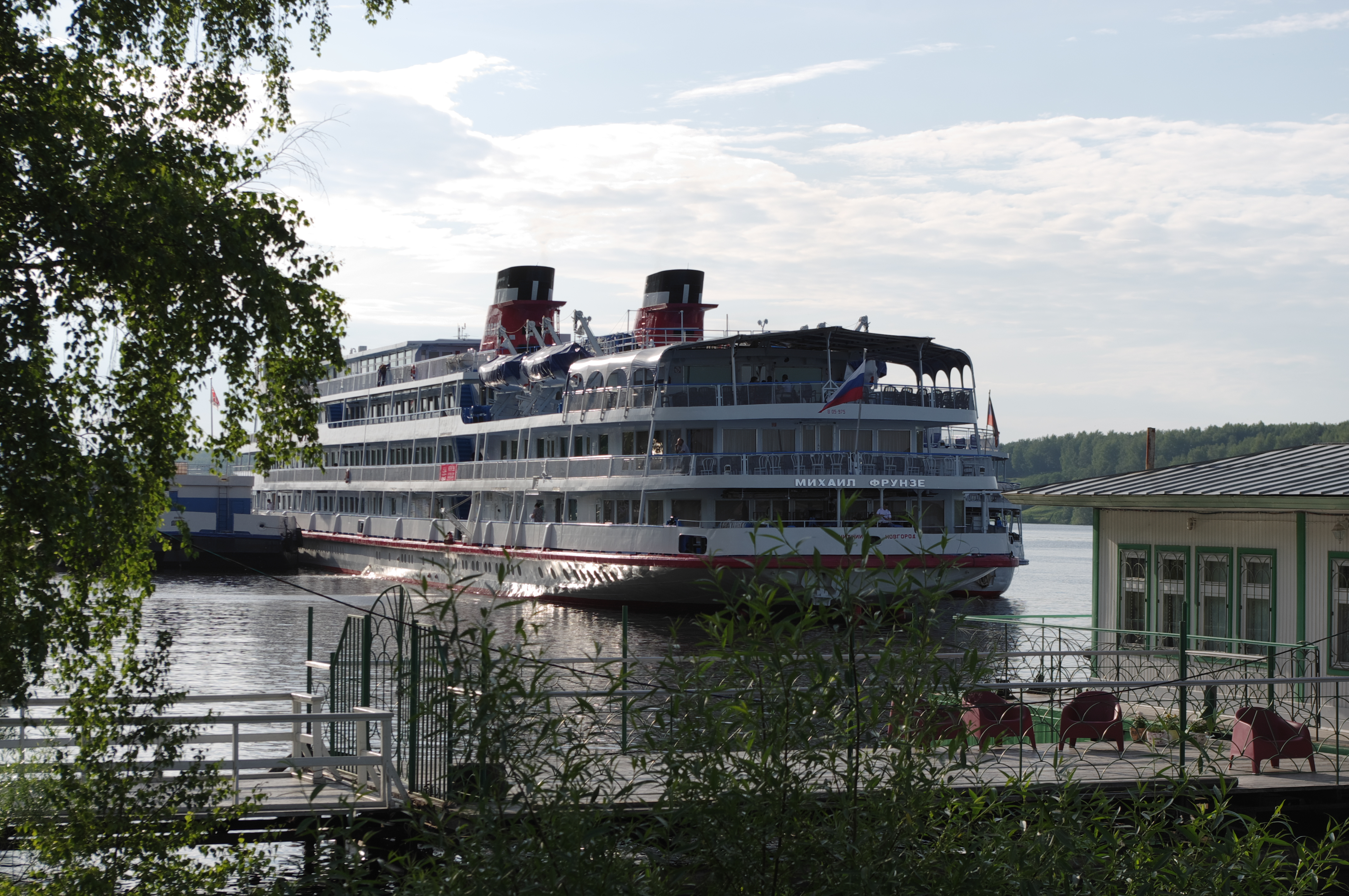
Mikhail Frunze at Plyos

== See also ==
- List of river cruise ships
