= Mikhail Frunze (disambiguation) =

Mikhail Frunze was a Soviet leader.

It might also refer to:

- Mikhail Frunze (ship)
- Mikhail Frunze Military Academy
- Frunze, city named after him
