= Lev Tolstoy-class steamship =

Lev Tolstoy-class steamship is a class of Russian river passenger ships. It is named after Leo Tolstoy.

One-and-half-deck cargo-passenger paddle steamers built in the Soviet Union since 1954.
