= Ryazan-class steamship =

Class overview
- Built: 1951-1959

General characteristics
- Type: River passenger ship

Ryazan-class steamship (formerly Iosif Stalin-class) is a class of Russian river passenger ships. It is named after the city of Ryazan.

Ryazan were two-deck paddle steamers of the Soviet Union and Hungarian construction manufactured from 1951–1959.
