= Tikhiy Don (ship) =

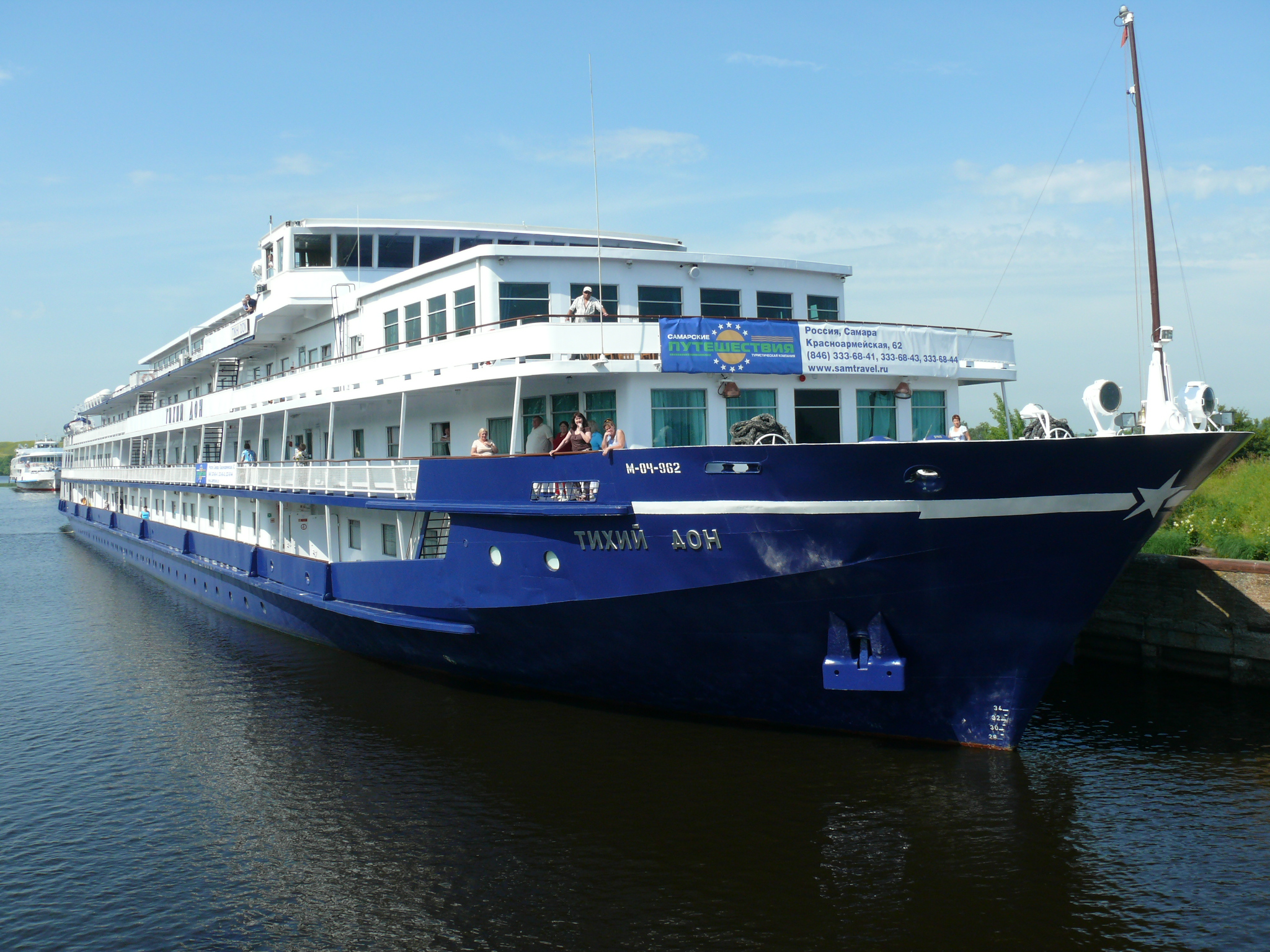
- Tikhiy Don at quay on 14 July 2009

History
- Name: Tikhiy Don
- Owner: 2005–2015: Grand Circle Cruise Line; 2016–2019: Doninturflot
- Operator: Phoenix
- Port of registry: 1977–1993: Rostov-on-Don, Soviet Union; 1993–2001: Rostov-on-Don, Russia; 2001–2016: Moscow, Russia; 2016 onwards: Rostov-on-Don, Russia
- Route: Rostov-on-Don – Astrakhan – Saint Petersburg for domestic and Moscow – Saint Petersburg for foreign tourists
- Builder: Elbewerften Boizenburg/Roßlau, Boizenburg
- Yard number: 330
- Completed: March 1977
- In service: 1977
- Identification: Call sign: UBGB6; IMO number: 7523752; MMSI number: 273434270; RRR number: 160204
- Status: In service

General characteristics
- Class & type: Vladimir Ilyich-class river cruise ship
- Tonnage: 5,640 GT
- Displacement: 3,570 tons;
- Length: 125.0 m (410.1 ft)
- Beam: 16.7 m (55 ft)
- Draught: 2.75 m (9.0 ft)
- Decks: 5 (4 passenger accessible)
- Installed power: 3 x 6ЧРН36/45 (ЭГ70-5)2,208 kilowatts (2,961 hp)
- Propulsion: 3 propellers
- Speed: 26.2 km/h (16.3 mph; 14.1 kn)
- Capacity: 216 passengers
- Crew: 98

The Tikhiy Don (Russian: Тихий Дон) is a Vladimir Ilyich-class (project 301, BiFa125M) Soviet/Russian river cruise ship, cruising in the Volga – Neva basin. The ship was built by VEB Elbewerften Boizenburg/Roßlau at their shipyard in Boizenburg, East Germany, and entered service in 1977. 2004–2015 owned and operated by Grand Circle Cruise Line. Her home port is currently Rostov-on-Don.

== Features ==
The ship has restaurant, bar, conference hall and library.

== See also ==
- List of river cruise ships
