= List of Russian river passenger ships =

This article lists Russian river passenger ships operated in the Soviet Union and modern Russia.

== Long voyage river passenger ships ==
=== Motorships ===
- Amur class motorship (project 386/Q-003), 2-deck
- Anton Chekhov class motorship (project Q-056), 4-deck
- Borodino class motorship (pre-Soviet project), 2-deck
- Baykal class motorship (project 646), 2-deck
- Dunay class motorship (project 305), 2-deck
- Dmitriy Furmanov class motorship (project 302), 4-deck
- Ivan Kalita class motorship (project 331), 1-deck
- Lenin class motorship (project 20), 3-deck
- Maksim Gorkiy class motorship (project Q-040), 4-deck
- Oktyabrskaya Revolyutsiya class motorship (project 26–37), 3-deck
- Otdykh class motorship (project R-80), 3-deck, catamaran
- Rodina class motorship (project 588), 3-deck
- Rossiya class motorship (project 785), 2-deck
- Rossiya class motorship (project 1877), 2-deck
- Sergey Yesenin class motorship (project Q-065), 3-deck
- Ukraina class motorship (project Q-053), 3-deck
- Valerian Kuybyshev class motorship (project 92-016), 4-deck
- Vasiliy Surikov class motorship (project Q-040A), 4-deck
- Vladimir Ilyich class motorship (project 301), 4-deck
- Volga class motorship (project Q-031), 3-deck
- Yerofey Khabarov class motorship (project 860), 2-deck

=== Steamships ===
- Lev Tolstoy class steamship, 1,5-deck
- N. V. Gogol steamship, 2-deck
- Ryazan class steamship (project 737), 2-deck
