= Vodohod =

Travel and holiday companies of Russia

Vodohod is a Russian cruise company and river cruise line operator, founded in 2004 by the Volga Shipping Company and named after Ivan Kulibin’s “water-going vessel” or “water-goer”. The company has its headquarters in Moscow and Saint Petersburg, Russia. After merging with Volga Flot Tour company operates more than 50 passenger ships along rivers of Volga, Don, Kama, the Moscow and Volga-Don canals, the Volga–Baltic Waterway, Northern–Western rivers, lakes Ladoga and Onega.

The company is also planning the launch of two, twin Finnish-built expedition ships under the codename Project Vega for delivery in 2021 and 2022.

The company is in the top three companies (along with Mosturflot and Infoflot) of the consolidated Russian river cruise market (the first five companies carry about 80% of the total passenger traffic).

== History ==
Since 1999, a subsidiary of the Volga Shipping Company, the river tourism company Volga-Flot-Tour, has been established. This date is considered the year of foundation of the cruise company.

In 2011, there was a consolidation of companies into private limited company Vodohod, which were in the shipping passenger division of the international transport holding UCL Holdingrude — Volgo-Balt Transport Holding (VBTH): "Volga-Flot-Tour", private limited company Vodohod-Moscow (a full-cycle shipping and travel company) and private limited company Vodohod-St. Petersburg (a cruise shipping company and travel agent for sea and river cruises). In 2017, the company withdrew from the UCLH holding.

"Vodohod-Saint-Petersburg" was established in 2004 on the basis of the St. Petersburg branch of Volga-Fleet-Tour PLC and operated in the North-West of Russia. In 2006, the company "Vodohod-Saint-Petersburg" transported about 400 thousand passengers by the high-speed fleet to the historical suburbs of St. Petersburg.

== Indicators ==
According to Kommersant, in 2016 (as part of VBTH) Vodohod transported 497,000 passengers. According to SPARK, the revenue of Vodohod in 2015 according to RAS is 2.6 billion rubles, net profit is 55 million rubles.

== Owners ==
Co-owners of the company are Riskhat Bahautdinov and Vladimir Kasanenko (100% of shares). The general director of the company is Rishate Bagautdin.

== Vodohod cruise ships ==
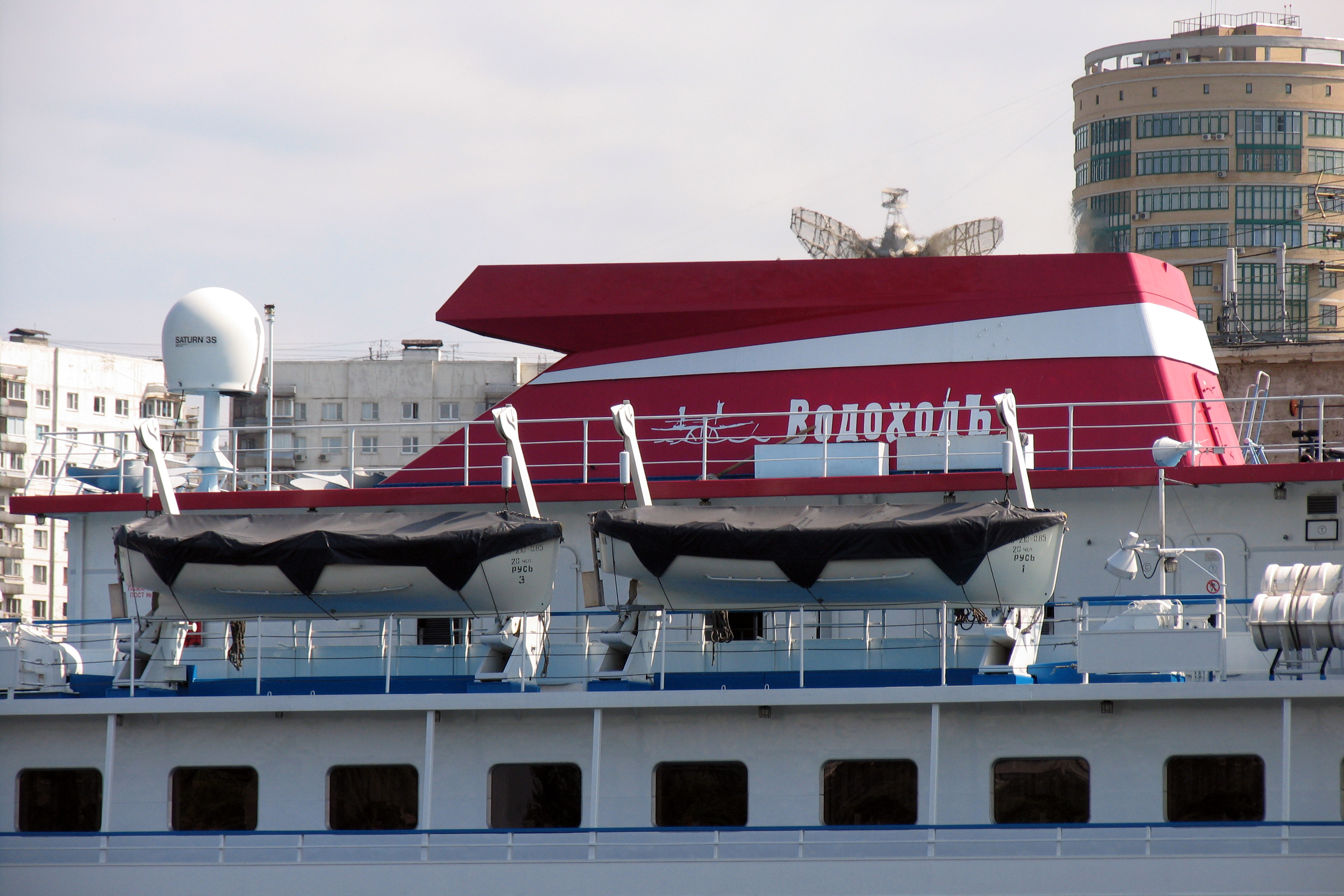
Funnel of the cruise ship Rus, painted in Vodohod's colors

The fleet of the company "Vodohod" has:

- 27 cruise fleet units (25 cruise ships in operation);
- 9 units of the passenger high-speed fleet of the "Meteor" type;
- 9 units of the pleasant fleet of the types "Moscow", "Neva" and "Otdikh".

From 2017, commissioned by the company at the "Krasnaya Sormovo" steam-ship of mixed swimming has laid on the rivers and seas "Prince Vladimir" — the second vessel of the PV300 project, developed by the company "Marine Engineering Bureau—CPb". This is the first passenger ship built on the Russian shipyard over the past 60 years. The operation of the four-panel liner began, but he received another name, "Karim Mustay". The vessel is calculated on 342 passengers.

Vodohd ship carry the Russian flag, and are owned by the company directly. The home ports of the ships sailing under the Russian flag are Nizhny Novgorod and Saint Petersburg.

=== Valerian Kuybyshev class ===
Valerian Kuybyshev-class motorships (Project 92-016)
Month and year of build	Hull No	Image	Name	Captain	Crew	Owned by Vodohod since	Status
December 1975	2001		Valerian Kuybyshev	Aleksandr Gribov		February 2012	MMSI number: 273365010
1977	2002		Fyodor Shalyapin	Aleksandr Gromov		March 2012	originally, the Kliment Voroshilov
1978	2003		Feliks Dzerzhinskiy	Mikhail Kucherov		February 2012	
1979	2004		Sergey Kuchkin			March 2012	originally, the Georgiy Dimitrov MMSI number: 273364090
April 1980	2005		Mikhail Frunze	Aleksandr Sainov		February 2012	
1981	2006		Mstislav Rostropovich			March 2012	originally, the Mikhail Kalinin
1981	2007		Aleksandr Suvorov	Igor Burenkow		February 2012	MMSI number: 273361090
1981	2008		Semyon Budyonnyy	Vitaly Kisten		March 2012	
April 1983	2009		Georgiy Zhukov	Viktor Progorshnev		February 2012	

=== Vladimir Ilyich class ===
Vladimir Ilyich-class motorships (Project 301)
Month and year of build	Hull No	Image	Name	Captain	Crew	Owned by Vodohod since	IMO	Status
July 1976	329		Konstantin Korotkov	Aleksandr Vladimirovich Silantyev		February 2012	7515432	originally, the Sovetskaya Ukraina, MMSI number: -7515432
September 1977	332		Nizhniy Novgorod	Vladimir Vassilyevich Chervyakov		February 2012	7617785	originally, the Sovetskaya Rossiya, MMSI number: -7617785
April 1980	339		Konstantin Fedin	Mikhail Stepanov		February 2012	8031354	MMSI number: 999999952
November 1980	371		Vissarion Belinskiy	Aleksandr Nikolaevich Protasyev		March 2012	8031378	
August 1981	373		Nikolay Chernyshevskiy			February 2012	8131520	
May 1982	375		Aleksandr Radishchev	Vassily Nikolaevich Meshkov		February 2012	8225682	

=== Dmitriy Furmanov class ===
Dmitriy Furmanov-class motorships (Project 302)
Month and year of build	Hull No	Image	Name	Captain	Crew	Owned by Vodohod since	IMO	Status
September 1984	382		Konstantin Simonov			February 2012	8422618	MMSI number: -8422618
April 1985	383		Leonid Sobolev			February 2012	8501000	MMSI number: -8501000
July 1986	387		Zosima Shashkov	Vladimir Vitalyevich Mironov	98	February 2012	8620090	MMSI number: 273368010
May 1987	389		Rus			February 2012	8707666	
June 1987	390		Lenin			February 2012	8707678	MMSI number: -8707678
September 1988	394		Georgiy Chicherin	Alexei Yuryevich Tsaryov	102–110	February 2012	8822507	

=== Anton Chekhov class ===
Anton Chekhov-class motorships (Project Q-056)
Month and year of build	Hull No	Image	Name	Captain	Crew	Owned by Vodohod since	IMO	Status
May 1979	K714		Lev Tolstoy	Vladimir Belodvortsev		February 2012		MMSI number: 273350150

=== Maksim Gorkiy class ===
Maksim Gorkiy-class motorships (Project Q-040)
Month and year of build	Hull No	Image	Name	Captain	Crew	Owned by Vodohod since	IMO	Status
April 1974	K704		Maksim Gorkiy	Sergey Batyalov	66	February 2012		MMSI number: 997799990
October 1974	K705		Aleksandr Pushkin	Aleksandr Sorochkin	66	February 2012		

== See also ==
- Volga Shipping Company
