= Yerofey Khabarov-class motorship =

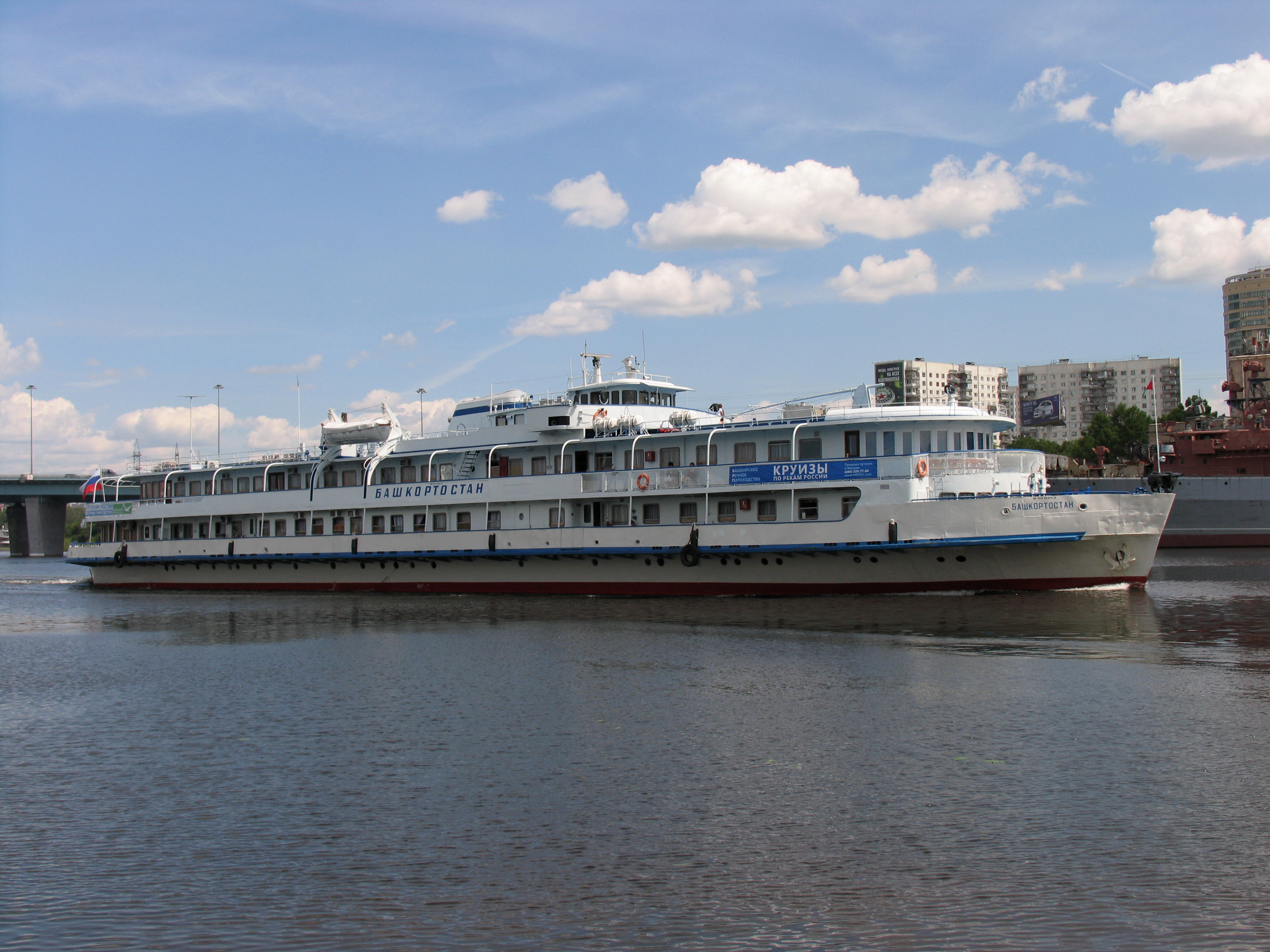
- Cruise ship Bashkortostan (22 June 2012)

Class overview
- Built: 1959-1963
- Planned: 13
- Building: 13
- Completed: 13

General characteristics
- Decks: 2
- Propulsion: 2

Yerofey Khabarov class motorship is a class of Russian river passenger ships. It is named after Yerofey Khabarov.

Two-deck cargo-passenger ships built in the Soviet Union, 1959–1963.
