= Rossiya-class motorship (1973) =

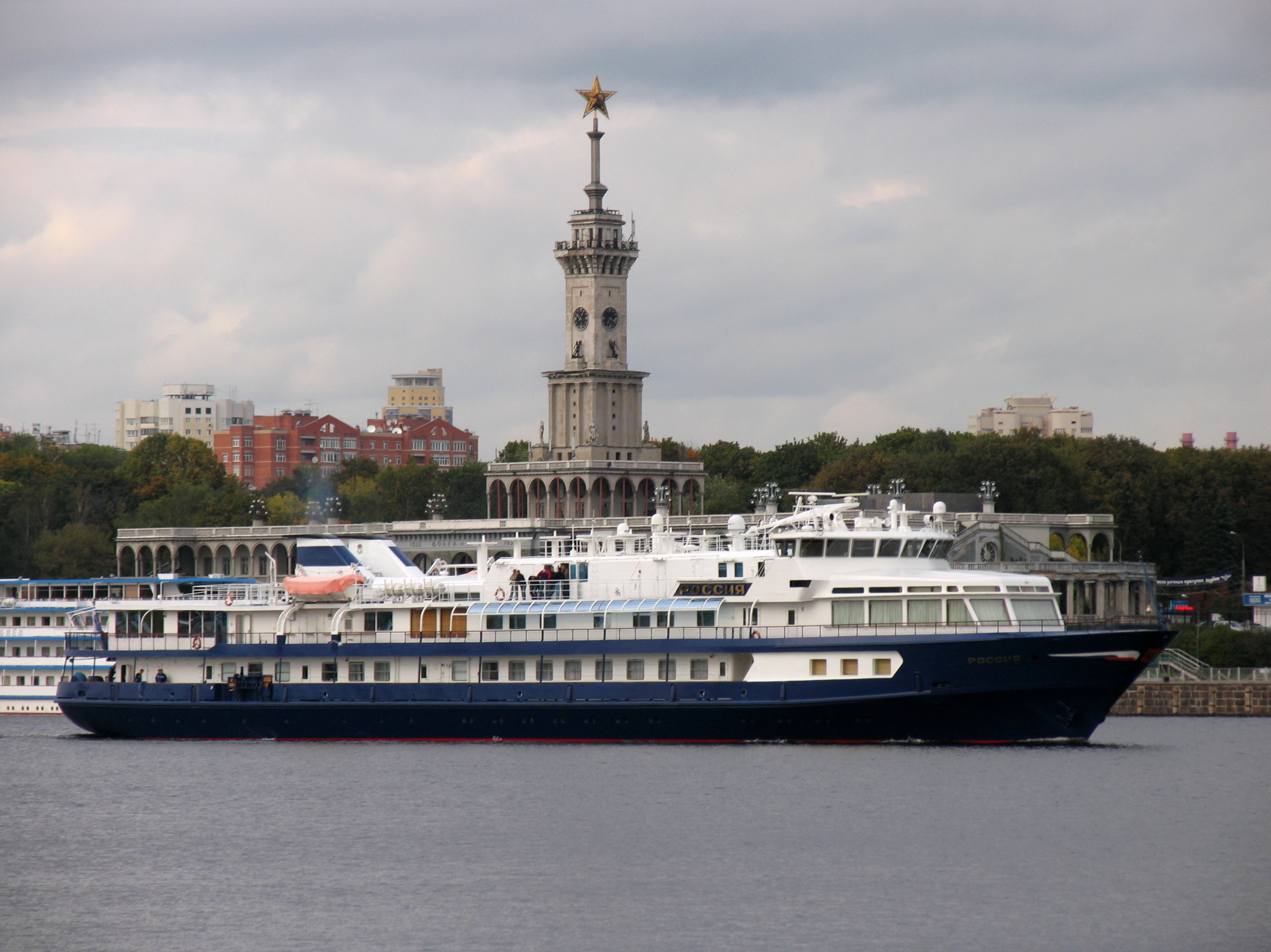
- Russian president's river ship Rossiya on September 22, 2011

Class overview
- Builders: Severnaya Verf, Leningrad
- Built: 1973
- In service: 1973–2013
- Planned: 1
- Building: 1
- Completed: 1
- Active: 1

General characteristics
- Type: Passenger ship
- Displacement: 1100 t
- Length: 83.6 m (274 ft)
- Beam: 12.7 m (42 ft)
- Draft: 2.36 m (7 ft 9 in)
- Depth: 4.5 m (15 ft)
- Decks: 3
- Speed: 30 km/h (19 mph; 16 kn)
- Capacity: 45 passengers
- Crew: 32

Rossiya class is a class of Russian river passenger ships. "Rossiya" means "Russia" in Russian.

A two-deck luxury passenger ship manufactured in Soviet Union in 1973 to service higher state management. Currently belongs to the Administration of President of Russian Federation.

== River passenger ships of the project 1877 ==
Rossiya class
No.	Original name	English transliteration
1	Россия	Rossiya

== Overview ==
Rossiya class
Year of build	Hull No	Image	Name	Operator	Flag	Status
1973	1335		Rossiya	Moskva River Shipping Company (MRSCO) → TK "Rossiya"	(Soviet Union) → (Russia)	No. 179430 (RRR), FGU Transportnyy Kombinat "Rossiya", Office of the President of the Russian Federation
