= Aleksandr Suvorov (ship) =

Russian river cruise ship

Coordinates: 56.330°N 44.009°E

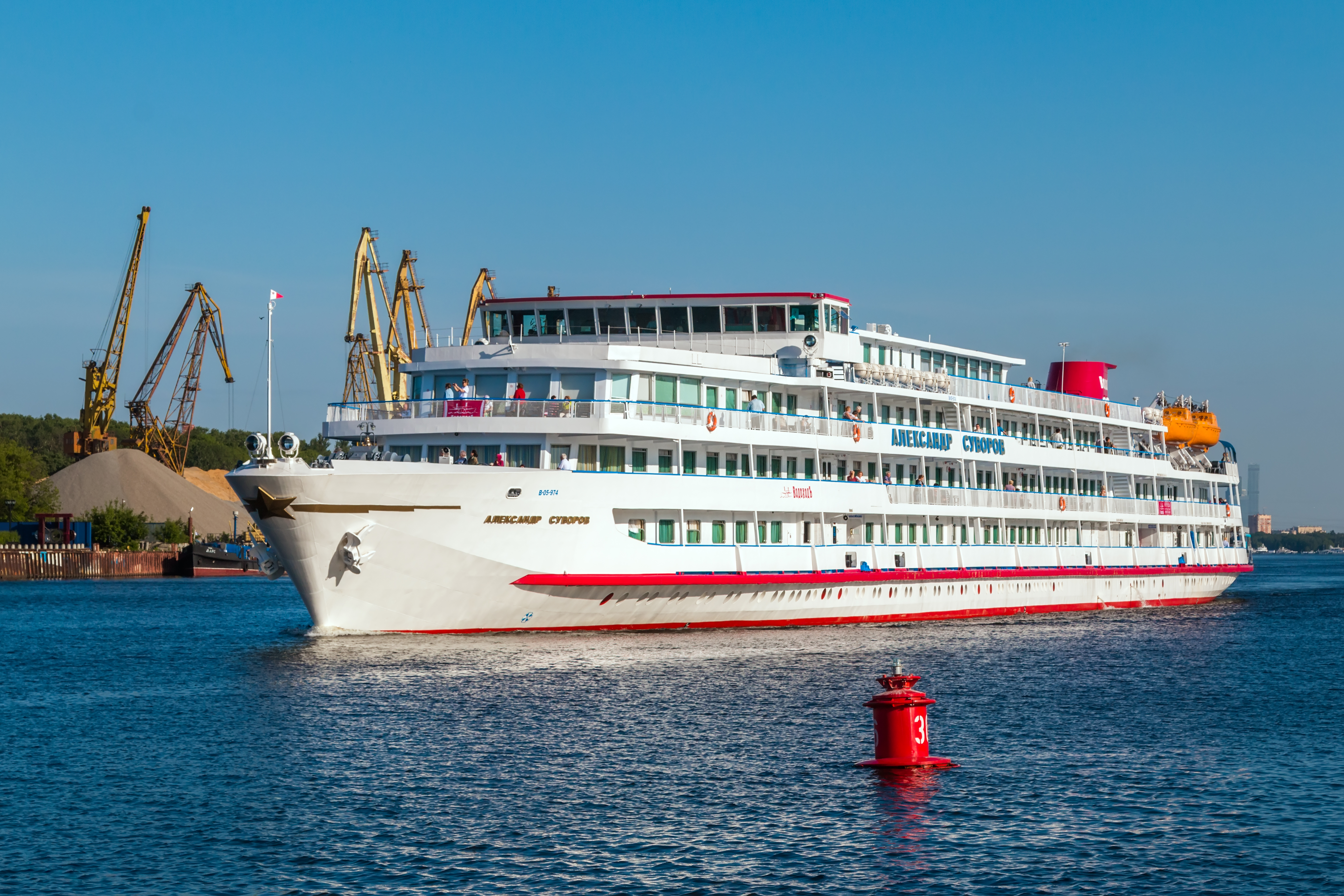
- River cruise ship Aleksandr Suvorov

History

Russia
- Name: Aleksandr Suvorov
- Owner: Volga-Don Shipping Company; Volga Shipping Company (VORP); Volga Shipping Company; V. F. Passazhirskiye Perevozky; Vodohod
- Operator: Volga-Don Shipping Company; Volga Shipping Company; Vodohod
- Port of registry: 1981–1984: Rostov-on-Don, Soviet Union; 1984–1994: Gorky, Soviet Union; 1994–2020: Nizhny Novgorod, Russia
- Builder: Slovenské Lodenice, Komárno, Czechoslovakia
- Yard number: 2007
- Launched: 1981
- Completed: 1981
- Identification: RRR Number: 140655; MMSI number: 273361090
- Status: In service

General characteristics
- Class & type: Valerian Kuybyshev-class river cruise ship
- Tonnage: 6,304 GT; 602 DWT
- Displacement: 3,950 t
- Length: 135.75 m (445.4 ft)
- Beam: 16.8 m (55 ft)
- Draught: 2.9 m (9.5 ft)
- Decks: 4
- Installed power: 3 × 6ЧРН36/45 (ЭГ70-5)2,208 kilowatts (2,961 hp)
- Propulsion: 3
- Speed: 26 km/h (16 mph; 14 kn)
- Capacity: 372 passengers
- Crew: 88

Aleksandr Suvorov (Russian: Александр Суворов) is a Valerian Kuybyshev-class (92-016, OL400) Soviet/Russian river cruise ship, cruising in the Volga–Don basin. On 5 June 1983 Aleksandr Suvorov crashed into a girder of the Ulyanovsk railway bridge. The catastrophe led to 176 deaths yet the ship stayed afloat, was restored and still navigates. Her home port is currently Nizhny Novgorod.

== History ==
The ship was built at Slovenské Lodenice in Komárno, Czechoslovakia in 1981 and was named after the 18th century Russian generalissimo Alexander Suvorov. Her length is 135.7 m, width 16.8 m, draft 2.9 m, and power 3 × 736 kW (2208). She has three engines and four decks. Her cruising speed is 26 km/h (16 mph; 14 kn), and her passenger capacity is 400. During the 1980s Aleksandr Suvorov was a flagship of the Volga-Don Lines and was based at Rostov-on-Don.

=== 1983 accident ===
On 5 June 1983, Aleksandr Suvorov sailed from Rostov to Moscow. There were 330 passengers, 30 crew and 35 service personnel aboard. It is believed that some unregistered passengers were also aboard the ship. At approximately 22:00, an auction was advertised as taking place in the cinema hall on the upper deck. A TV translation was to take place at 22:45, which attracted many passengers to the upper deck. The chief mate Vladimir Mitenkov and helmsman Uvarov operated the ship from the wheelhouse, which was also on the upper deck. Captain Vladimir Kleymenov was resting in his cabin. The ship was sailing at 25 km/h (16 mph; 13 kn), the maximum speed. The ship reached the sixth span of the bridge (instead of passable second span) which was lower than the main deck. At that moment, a freight train went over the bridge. Controllers at the bank had noticed that Aleksandr Suvorov had come to the wrong span. They sent a radio message to the ship, but there was no reply. They then launched a warning flare, but it was too late. The span cut the deck house and the cinema hall, whilst the lowest deck was undamaged. The impact damaged the bridge, derailed some cars, and some of their contents fell onto the ship. Aleksandr Suvorov continued for another 300 metres (1000 ft) after the bridge. The rescue boats reached Aleksandr Suvorov 40 minutes later.

Soon after the tragedy, Ulyanovsk was declared a closed city. Volunteers became blood donors and made makeshift coffins. Most of the injured survivors had avulsed wounds as a result of being hit by grain and coal from the train cars.

=== Investigation ===
Immediately after the catastrophe, different versions of events circulated amongst the population, varying from the drunkenness of the crew to criminal activity. A special commission under Heydar Aliyev investigated the disaster.

The commission proposed four official versions:

1. criminal negligence of chief mate Mitenkov
2. criminal negligence of helmsman Uvarov
3. criminal negligence of the railwaymen, who did not set up the illumination of the bridge
4. there was no illumination at the bridge

There was a switch tower on the bridge which looked similar to the navigation sign which was there to indicate the right span to use for passing under the bridge. Railwaymen and sailors had previously argued about the illumination of the bridge, but there was speculation that Aliyev protected the Soviet Railways minister Boris Beshchev and the crew of the Suvorov were accused. An expert proved that Mitenkov and Uvarov, who were killed in the accident, were sober.

After the accident, Captain Kleymenov was picked up at the dam near the bridge footing. He was in swimming trunks and was distraught. As he had failed to prevent the accident and had not provided a proper order, he was condemned to ten years imprisonment, but was released six years later. He died of an infarction in 1990.

== See also ==
- Bulgaria (1955 ship)
- List of river cruise ships
