= Volga Shipping Company =

Volga Shipping
- Company type: Open Joint Stock Company
- Industry: Transportation
- Founded: 1843
- Headquarters: Nizhniy Novgorod, Russia
- Revenue: ▲US$ 165.8 mln (2011)
- Operating income: ▼US$ 19 mln (2011)
- Number of employees: 3,300 (2011)
- Website: Volga Shipping Company

The Volga Shipping Company (Russian: Волжское пароходство, romanized: Volzhskoye parokhodstvo) is a Russian ship-owning company within UCL Holding and is ultimately controlled by Vladimir Lisin's Fletcher Group Holdings Ltd.

== Operations ==
The company owns a fleet of 300 vessels, which carried 6.7 million tonnes of freight and 368,000 passengers in 2011. The company operates over 236 cargo ships and tankers.

== History ==
The company was founded in 1843 as On the Volga steamship company, went through a number of structural and ownership changes over the years, emerging under its current name and structure in 1994.

== See also ==
- Vodohod
