= Shashkov =

Shashkov (masculine, Russian: Шашков) or Shashkova (feminine, Russian: Шашкова) is a Russian surname. Notable people with the surname include:

- Sergei Shashkov (born 1972), Russian soccer player

== See also ==
- Zosima Shashkov (ship)
