= Dmitriy Furmanov-class motorship =

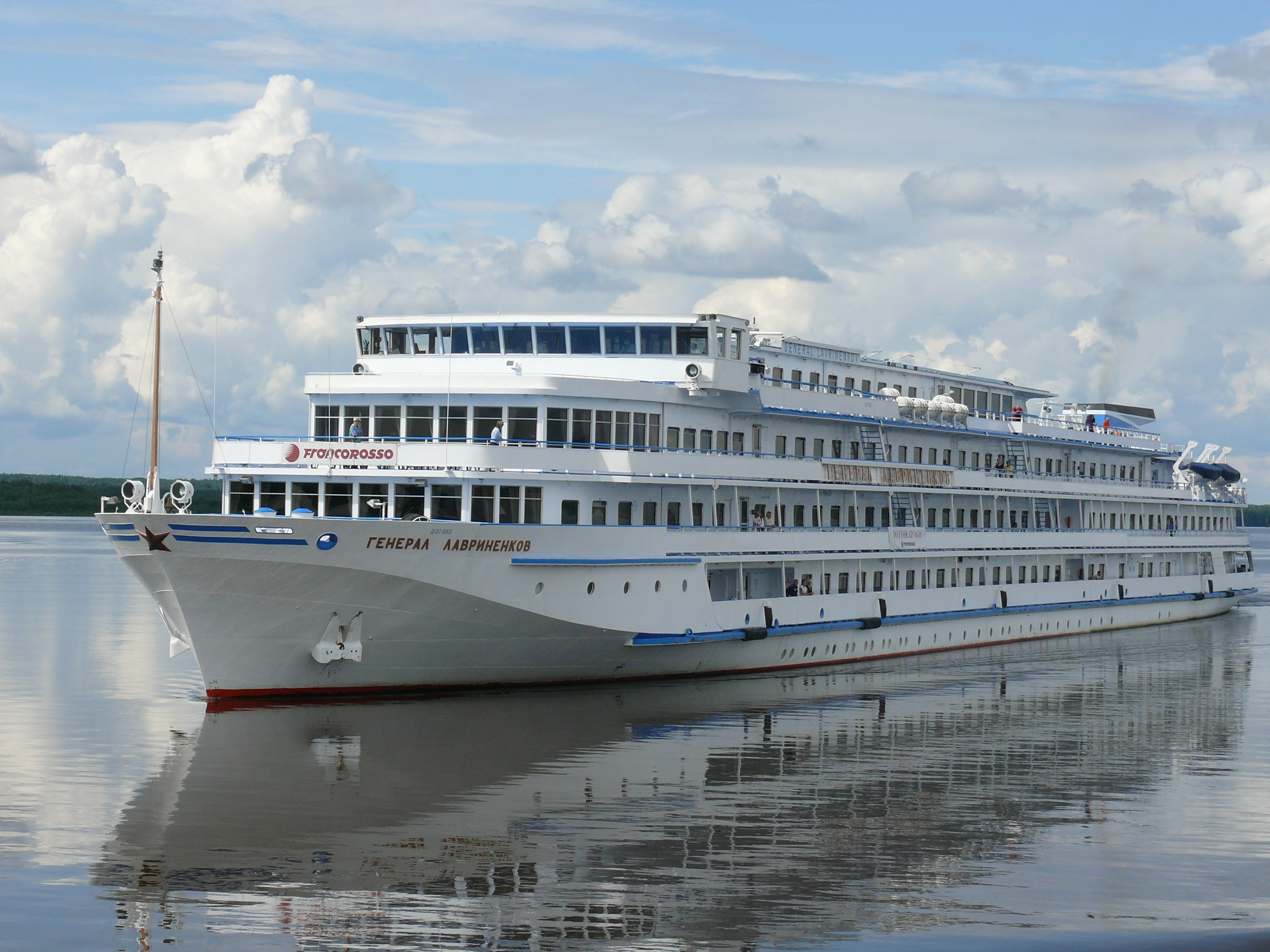
- River cruise ship General Lavrinenkov - Project 302 / BiFa129M

Class overview
- Builders: VEB Elbewerften Boizenburg/Roßlau, Boizenburg, East Germany; Elbewerft Boizenburg GmbH, Germany
- Operators: Vodohod
- Preceded by: Vladimir Ilyich class (301)
- Succeeded by: 303
- Built: 1983–1992
- In service: 1983
- Planned: 28
- Building: 27 + 1
- Completed: 27 + 1
- Active: 28

General characteristics
- Type: River cruise ship
- Tonnage: 5,414 – 6,130 GT; 5,475 GT (302MK)
- Displacement: 3,852 t
- Length: 129.1 m (423 ft 7 in)
- Beam: 16.7 m (54 ft 9 in)
- Draught: 2.9 m (9 ft 6 in)
- Decks: 4 passenger decks
- Installed power: 3 × 6ЧРН36/45 (ЭГ70-5) 2,208 kW (2,961 hp)
- Propulsion: 3
- Speed: 26 km/h (16 mph; 14 kn)
- Capacity: 332 passengers
- Crew: 98

The Dmitriy Furmanov class is a class of Russian river passenger ships, project 302, 302M, 302MK / German name BiFa129M. The class takes its name from the lead ship in the class, Dmitriy Furmanov, which in her turn was named after Dmitry Furmanov.

The vessels in the class are four-deck cruise ships manufactured at Boizenburg, East Germany, from 1983 to 1992.

== River cruise ships of the German project 302, 302M, 302MK / BiFa129M ==
Dmitriy Furmanov-class motorships
No.	Original name	English transliteration
First series of Project 302
1	Дмитрий Фурманов	Dmitriy Furmanov
2	Академик Виктор Глушков (Академiк Віктор Глушков, Академик Глушков, Игорь Стравинский, Волга Стар)	Akademik Viktor Glushkov (Akademik Viktor Glushkov (ukr.), Akademik Glushkov, Igor Stravinskiy, Volga Star)
3	Новиков-Прибой (Сергей Дягилев)	Novikov-Priboy (Sergey Dyagilev)
4	Алексей Сурков (Викинг Хельги)	Aleksey Surkov (Viking Helgi)
5	Константин Симонов	Konstantin Simonov
6	Леонид Соболев	Leonid Sobolev
7	Михаил Шолохов	Mikhail Sholokhov
Second series of Project 302
8	Алексей Ватченко (Иван Бунин)	Aleksey Vatchenko (Ivan Bunin)
9	Юрий Андропов	Yuriy Andropov
10	Зосима Шашков	Zosima Shashkov
11	Генерал Ватутин (Генерал Ватутiн, General Vatutin, Лебединое озеро)	General Vatutin (ukr. General Vatutin, General Vatutin, Lebedinoye Ozero)
12	Русь	Rus
13	Ленин	Lenin
14	Сергей Киров (Викинг Трувор)	Sergey Kirov (Viking Truvor)
15	Маршал Рыбалко (Зiрка Днiпра, Zirka Dnipra, Зирка Днепра, Лунная соната)	Marshal Rybalko (Zirka Dnipra, Lunnaya Sonata)
16	Маршал Кошевой (Викинг Акун)	Marshal Koshevoy (Viking Akun)
17	Георгий Чичерин	Georgiy Chicherin
18	Леонид Красин	Leonid Krasin
19	Николай Бауман (Княжна Анастасия)	Nikolay Bauman (Knyazhna Anastasiya)
20	Генерал Лавриненков	General Lavrinenkov
21	Нарком Пахомов (Викинг Ингвар)	Narkom Pakhomov (Viking Ingvar)
Third series of Project 302
22	Глеб Кржижановский (А. С. Пушкин)	Gleb Krzhizhanovskiy (A. S. Pushkin)
23	Максим Литвинов	Maksim Litvinov
Fourth series of Project 302
24	Тарас Шевченко (Т. Г. Шевченко)	Taras Shevchenko (T. G. Shevchenko)
25	Константин Станюкович (仙妮 or Xiānnī)	Konstantin Stanyukovich (Xian Ni)
26	Аркадий Гайдар (仙娜 or Xiānnà)	Arkadiy Gaydar (Xian Na)
27	Александр Грин (仙婷 or Xiāntíng)	Aleksandr Grin (Xian Ting)
28	planned as Владимир Высоцкий, but was built as Ocean Diva Original	planned as Vladimir Vysotskiy, but was built as Ocean Diva Original

== Overview ==
Year of build	Yard No	Image	Name	Owner	Operator	Port of Registry	Flag	IMO	Status
Project 302 - First Series
June 1983	378		Dmitriy Furmanov	Kama Three Shipping Co	Iridiy	Perm → Nizhny Novgorod	→	8218598	RRR number: 160219
August 1983	379		Volga Star	Rechflotinvest	Doninturflot	Kherson → Rostov-on-Don	→ →	8326008	originally, the Akademik Viktor Glushkov, formerly, Akademik Glushkov; Igor Stravinskiy; RRR number: 160220
October 1983	380		Sergey Dyagilev	Doninturflot	Doninturflot	Rostov-on-Don	→	8326010	originally, the Novikov-Priboy (until 2011); RRR number: 160221
June 1984	381		Viking Helgi	Passazhirskiy Flot	Passazhirskiy Flot	Leningrad → Saint Petersburg	→	8422606	originally, the Aleksey Surkov; MMSI number: 273367610; RRR number: 160222
September 1984	382		Konstantin Simonov	Vodohod	Vodohod	Gorky → Nizhny Novgorod	→	8422618	MMSI number: 277333444; RRR number: 160223
April 1985	383		Leonid Sobolev	Vodohod	Vodohod	Gorky → Nizhny Novgorod	→	8501000	RRR number: 160224
June 1985	384		Mikhail Sholokhov	Doninturflot	Doninturflot	Rostov-on-Don	→	8521919	RRR number: 160225
Project 302 - Second Series
July 1985	385		Ivan Bunin	Doninturflot	Doninturflot	Kiev → Kherson → Moscow → Rostov-on-Don	→ →	8521921	originally, the Aleksey Vatchenko (until 2006); RRR number 219748
February 1986	386		Yuriy Andropov	Volga Shipping	Volga Shipping	Gorky → Nizhny Novgorod	→	8620105	RRR number: 219749
July 1986	387		Zosima Shashkov	V. F. Passazhirskiye Perevozki	Vodohod	Gorky → Nizhny Novgorod	→	8620090	MMSI number: 273368010; RRR number: 219750
September 1986	388		Lebedinoye Ozero	–	–	Kherson → Belize → Nizhny Novgorod	→ → →	8620088	originally, the General Vatutin as Russian Генерал Ватутин (until 1993); MMSI number: 273413250; RRR number: 242313
May 1987	389		Rus	Vodohod	Vodohod	Gorky → Nizhny Novgorod	→	8707666	MMSI number: 273358150; RRR number: 219752
June 1987	390		Lenin	Vodohod	Vodohod	Gorky → Nizhny Novgorod	→	8707678	RRR number: 222701
September 1987	391		Viking Truvor	Passazhirskiy Flot	Passazhirskiy Flot	Leningrad → Saint Petersburg	→	8707680	originally, the Sergey Kirov; MMSI number: 273360710; RRR number: 222702
March 1988	392		Lunnaya Sonata	–	–	Kiev → Kherson → Belize → Nizhny Novgorod	→ → →	8707692	originally, the Marshal Rybalko (until 2005), Zirka Dnipra; MMSI number: 273419950; RSU number: 2-000191 → RRR number: 242314
July 1988	393		Viking Akun	Passazhirskiy Flot	Passazhirskiy Flot	Kherson → Rostov-on-Don → Saint Petersburg	→ →	8707707	originally, the Marshal Koshevoy; MMSI number: 273332470; RRR number: 222704
September 1988	394		Georgiy Chicherin	Vodohod	Vodohod	Gorky → Nizhny Novgorod	→	8822507	MMSI number: 273999993; RRR number: 222705
March 1989	395		Leonid Krasin	Mosturflot	Mosturflot	Moscow	→	8922448	MMSI number: 273364310; RRR number: 222706
June 1989	396		Knyazhna Anastasiya	Mosturflot	Mosturflot	Moscow	→	8922450	originally, the Nikolay Bauman, USSR Flag and factory acceptance protocol on 27 June 1989; RRR number: 222707
March 1990	397		General Lavrinenkov	Doninturflot	Doninturflot	Kherson → Rostov-on-Don	→ →	8963595	MMSI number: -8963595; RRR number: 222708
June 1990	398		Viking Ingvar	Passazhirskiy Flot	Passazhirskiy Flot	Leningrad → Saint Petersburg	→		originally, the Narkom Pakhomov; RRR number: 222709
July 1990	301		A. S. Pushkin	Moskva River Shipping	Mosturflot	Moscow	→		originally, the Gleb Krzhizhanovskiy; MMSI number: 273332470; RRR number: RRR number: 222710
April 1991	302		Maksim Litvinov	Doninturflot	Doninturflot	Rostov-on-Don	→		RRR number: 225814 autumn 2011 hotelship in the Kurmangazy oil field (Курмангазы)
September 1991	303		T. G. Shevchenko	Kaspii Ak Zhelken	Kaspii Ak Zhelken	Kherson → Aqtau → Novorossiysk	→ →	8925036	MMSI number: 273341690; RRR number: 225815 since autumn 2011 hotelship in the Kurmangazy oil field (Курмангазы)
October 1991	304		Xian Ni	Regal China Cruises	Regal China Cruises	Nantong	People's Republic of China		originally, the Konstantin Stanyukovich
November 1991	305	Image	Xian Na	Regal China Cruises	Regal China Cruises	Nantong	People's Republic of China		originally, the Arkadiy Gaidar (ru. Аркадий Гайдар); 3 Princesses on the picture
December 1991	306		Xian Ting	Regal China Cruises	Regal China Cruises	Nantong	People's Republic of China		originally, the Aleksandr Grin (ru. Александр Грин); Three Princesses in the picture
1996 (hull); 2003	307		Ocean Diva Original	Oceandiva	Oceandiva	Amsterdam	Netherlands		*planned as Vladimir Vysotskiy

== See also ==
- List of river cruise ships
- Valerian Kuybyshev-class motorship
- Rossiya-class motorship (1952)
- Rossiya-class motorship (1973)
- Anton Chekhov-class motorship
- Vladimir Ilyich-class motorship
- Rodina-class motorship
- Baykal-class motorship
- Sergey Yesenin-class motorship
- Oktyabrskaya Revolyutsiya-class motorship
- Yerofey Khabarov-class motorship
- Dunay-class motorship
- Volga-class motorship
