= Taras Shevchenko (disambiguation) =

Taras Shevchenko was a Ukrainian writer, artist, and political figure.

Taras Shevchenko may also refer to:

- Taras Shevchenko (film), a 1951 Soviet film
- MS Taras Shevchenko (1991), a river cruise ship operated by Imperial Travel
- MS Taras Shevchenko (1966), a former cruise ship operated by the Soviet Union's Black Sea Shipping Company, scrapped in 2005
- Tarasa Shevchenka (Kyiv Metro), subway station
- Taras Shevchenko, a video tape released by New Order
- Taras Shevchenko Memorial, a 1964 monument in Washington D.C., United States
