= Viking Truvor =

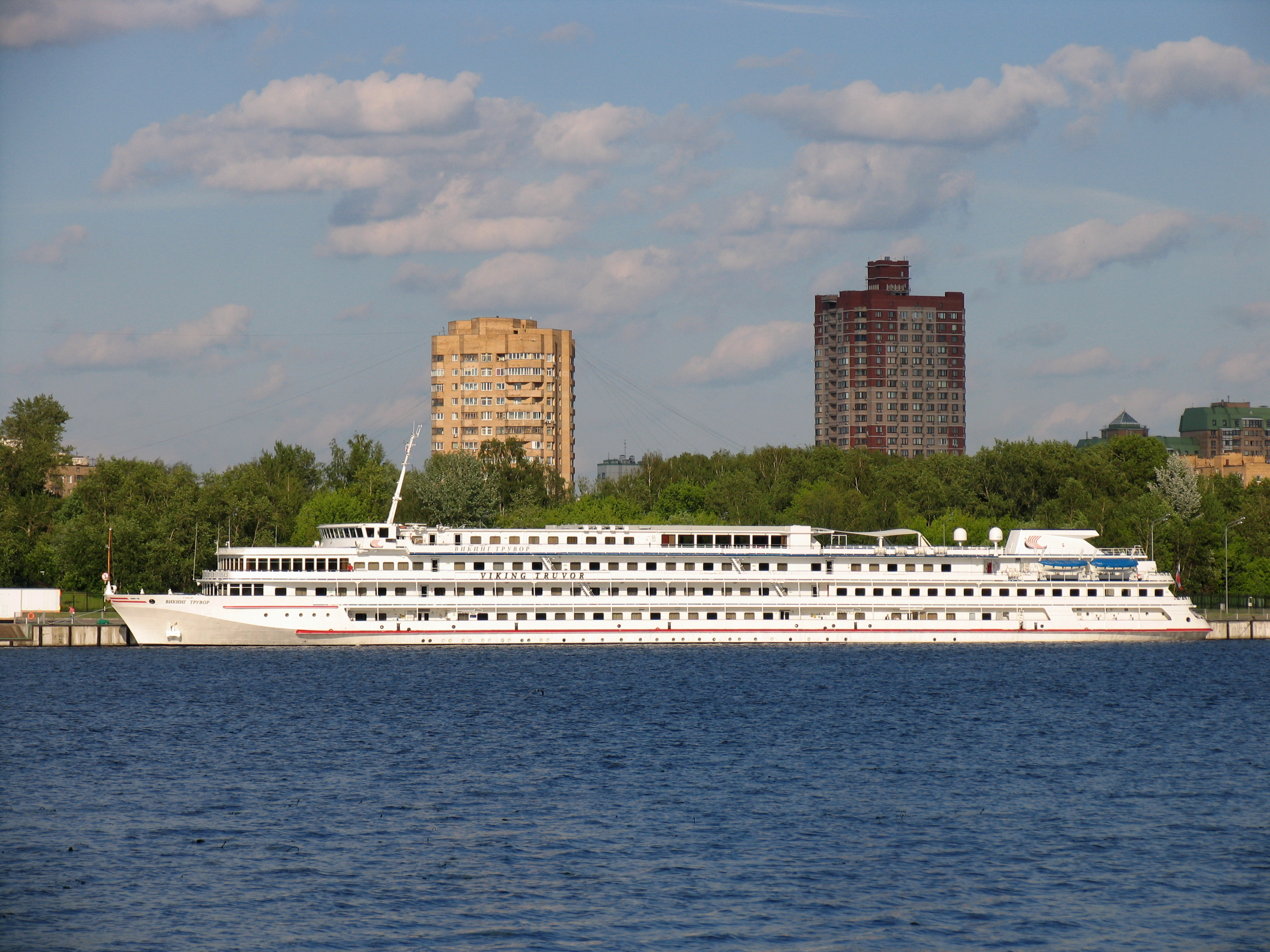
- Viking Truvor in North River Port of Moscow on 9 June 2012

History
- Name: 2012: Viking Truvor; 1987–2012: Sergey Kirov
- Owner: 1988–1993: North-Western Shipping Company (ГП Северо-Западное речное пароходство МРФ РСФСР); 1993–2003: North-Western Shipping Company (Северо-Западное пароходство); 2003–2017: OOO Passazhirskiy Flot (ООО Пассажирский флот)
- Operator: Viking River Cruises (Viking Cruises (Moscow))
- Port of registry: 1987–1993: Saint Petersburg, Soviet Union; 1993–2018: Saint Petersburg, Russia
- Route: Saint Petersburg – Moscow
- Builder: VEB Elbewerften Boizenburg/Roßlau, Boizenburg, East Germany
- Yard number: 391
- Completed: September 1987
- In service: 1987
- Identification: Call sign: UAXG2; RRR number: 222702; IMO number: 8707680; MMSI number: 273360710
- Status: In service

General characteristics
- Class & type: Dmitriy Furmanov-class river cruise ship
- Tonnage: 5,594 GT; 493 DWT
- Displacement: 3,852 tons;
- Length: 129.1 m (424 ft)
- Beam: 16.7 m (55 ft)
- Draught: 2.88 m (9.4 ft)
- Decks: 5 (4 passenger accessible)
- Installed power: 3 x 6ЧРН36/45 (ЭГ70-5)2,208 kilowatts (2,961 hp)
- Propulsion: 3 propellers
- Speed: 25.5 km/h (15.8 mph; 13.8 kn)
- Capacity: 250 passengers (106 cabins)
- Crew: 120

Viking Truvor (Russian: Викинг Трувор) (formerly Sergey Kirov) is a Dmitriy Furmanov-class (302, BiFa129M) Soviet/Russian river cruise ship, cruising in the Volga – Neva basin. The ship was built by VEB Elbewerften Boizenburg/Roßlau at their shipyard in Boizenburg, East Germany, and entered service in 1987. Her home port is currently Saint Petersburg.

== Features ==
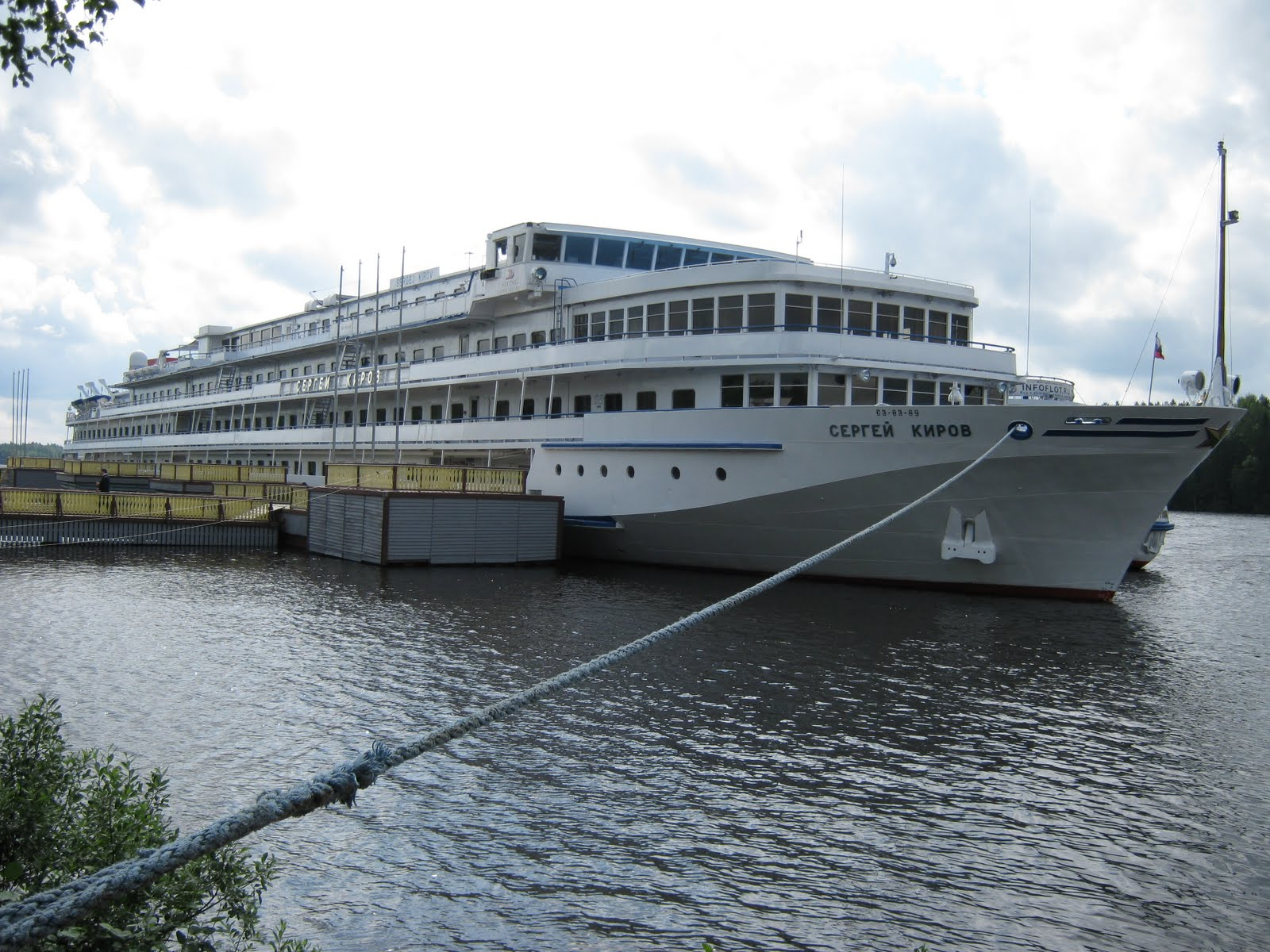
Sergej Kirov in June 2010

The ship has one restaurant “Neva” with panoramic views, two bars: Sky Bar and Panorama Bar, observation lounge and two bars with panoramic windows, library and onboard boutique.

== See also ==
- List of river cruise ships
