= Xian Ni =

Chinese river cruise ship

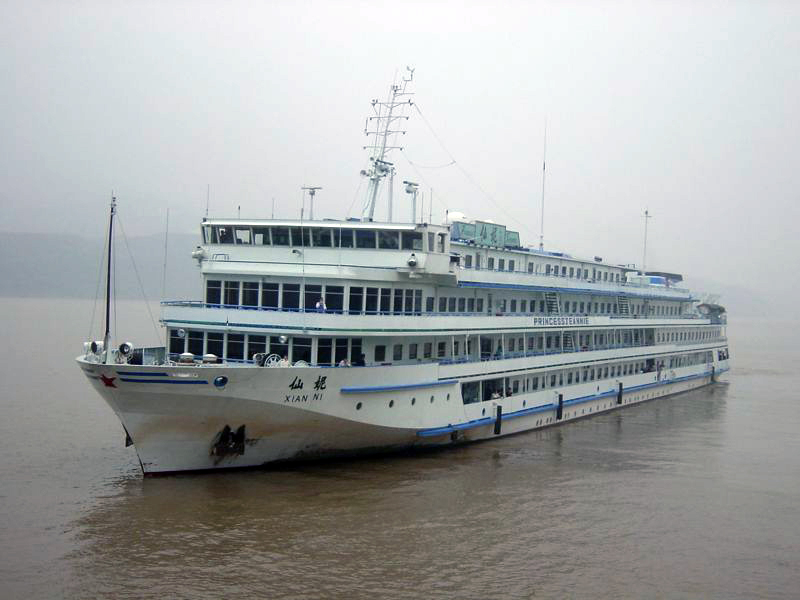
- Xian Ni on the Yangtze River, in 2002

History
- Name: Konstantin Stanyukovich (1991–1994); Xian Ni (1994–2015); Forever Lucky (2015–2023)
- Owner: China Regal Cruises
- Operator: China Regal Cruises
- Port of registry: 1991–1994: 1994–2015: Nantong, China; 2015–2023: ?, Philippines
- Builder: Elbewerft Boizenburg GmbH, Boizenburg
- Yard number: 304
- Launched: 1991
- Completed: October 1991
- Identification: Call sign: BHJN; IMO number: 8529179; MMSI number: 413771621
- Status: In service, laid up

General characteristics
- Class & type: Dmitriy Furmanov-class river cruise ship
- Tonnage: 5,475 GT; 480 DWT
- Length: 129.1 m (423 ft 7 in)
- Beam: 16.7 m (54 ft 9 in)
- Draught: 2.94 m (9 ft 8 in)
- Decks: 5 (4 passenger accessible)
- Installed power: 3 × 6ЧРН36/45 (ЭГ70-5)2,208 kilowatts (2,961 hp)
- Propulsion: 3 propellers
- Speed: 25.5 km/h (15.8 mph; 13.8 kn)
- Capacity: 278 passengers (140 cabins)
- Crew: 140

Xian Ni (Chinese: 仙妮, Xiānnī) (formerly Konstantin Stanyukovich) is a Dmitriy Furmanov-class (project 302MK, BiFa129M) Chinese river cruise ship, cruising on the Yangtze River. The ship was built by VEB Elbewerften Boizenburg/Roßlau at their shipyard in Boizenburg, East Germany, and entered service in 1994. Her home port is currently Nantong.

== Features ==
The ship has two restaurants: Golden Pavilion Dining Room on the Boat deck and Emperor's Dining Hall (176 places) on the Upper deck, two bars: Misty Observation Lounge/library (Boat deck) and Lotus Bar on the Upper deck, a conference hall which can seat up to 220 people, a sauna, and a souvenir shop.

== See also ==
- List of river cruise ships
