= Viking Helgi =

Russian river cruise ship currently operating in the Volga-Neva basin

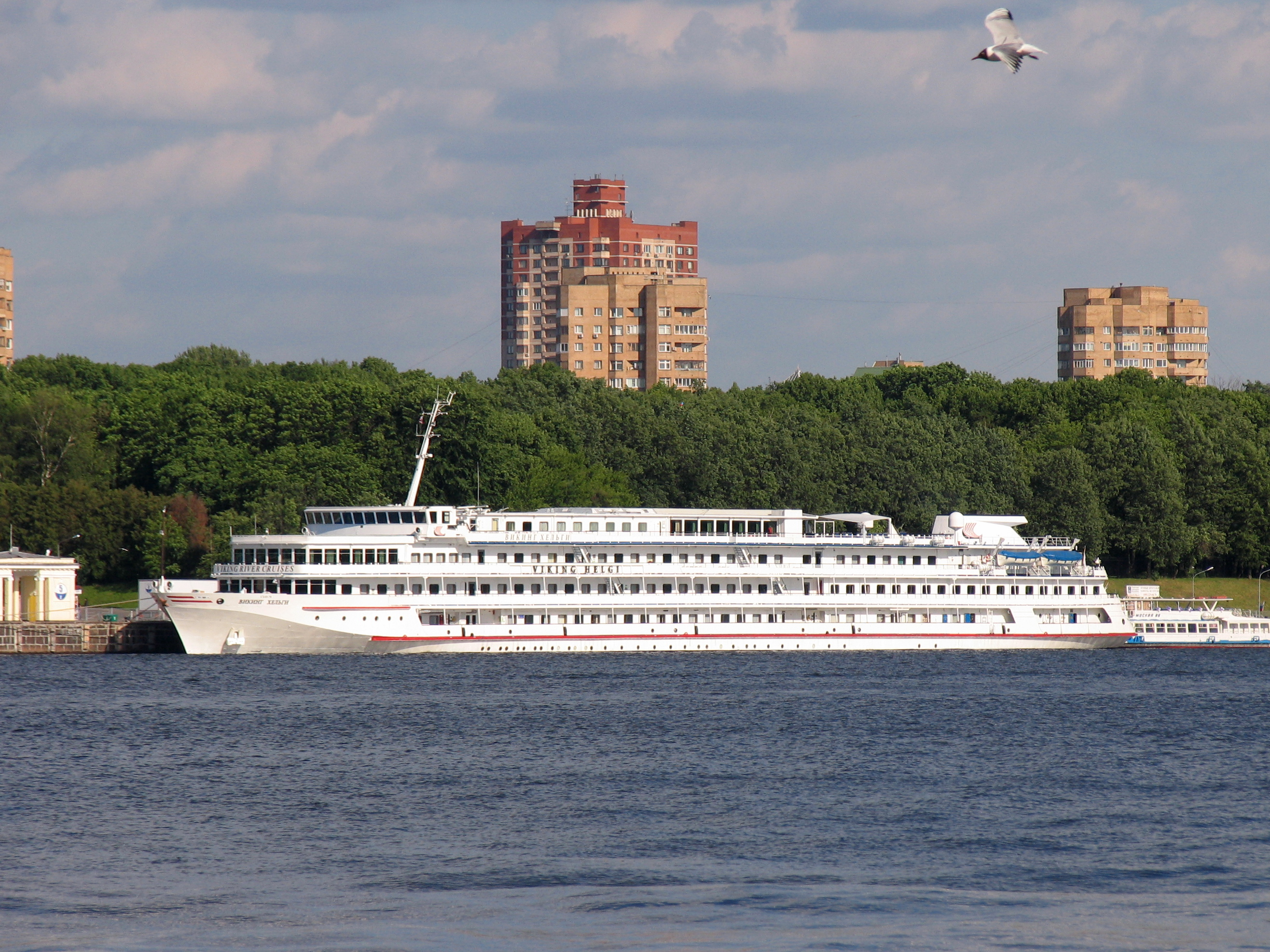
- Viking Helgi at Northern River Terminal in Moscow on 9 June 2012

History
- Name: Aleksey Surkov (1984–2012); Viking Helgi (2012–2016)
- Owner: 2003–2016: Passazhirskiy Flot
- Operator: Passazhirskiy Flot
- Port of registry: 1984–1993: Leningrad, Soviet Union; 1993–2016: Saint Petersburg, Russia
- Route: Moscow – Saint Petersburg
- Builder: VEB Elbewerften Boizenburg/Roßlau, Boizenburg, East Germany
- Yard number: 381
- Completed: June 1984
- In service: 1984
- Identification: Call sign: UAWG9; RRR number: 160222; IMO number: 8422606; MMSI number: 273367610
- Status: In service

General characteristics
- Class & type: Dmitriy Furmanov-class river cruise ship
- Tonnage: 5,594 GT; 493 DWT
- Displacement: 3,853 tons;
- Length: 129.0 m (423.2 ft)
- Beam: 16.7 m (55 ft)
- Draught: 2.88 m (9.4 ft)
- Decks: 5 (4 passenger accessible)
- Installed power: 3 × 6ЧРН36/45 (ЭГ70-5); 2,208 kilowatts (2,961 hp)
- Propulsion: 3 propellers
- Speed: 25.5 km/h (15.8 mph; 13.8 kn)
- Capacity: 250 passengers
- Crew: 120

The Viking Helgi (Russian: Викинг Хельги) is a Dmitriy Furmanov-class (project 302, BiFa129M) Soviet/Russian river cruise ship, cruising in the Volga – Neva basin. The ship was built by VEB Elbewerften Boizenburg/Roßlau at their shipyard in Boizenburg, East Germany, and entered service in 1984 as Aleksey Surkov being renamed after Oleg of Novgorod in its Scandinavian version Helgi in 2012.

Viking Helgi sails under Russian flag. Her home port is currently Saint Petersburg.

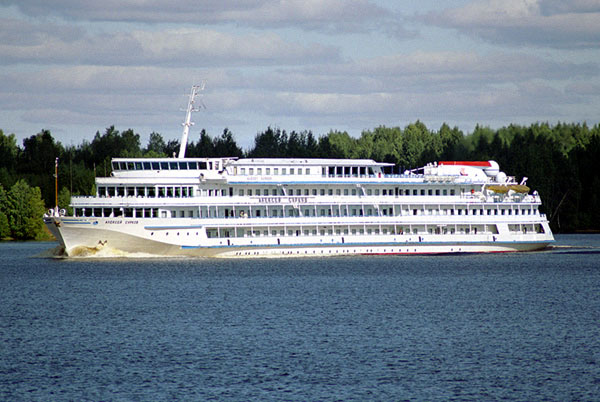
Aleksey Surkov in 2004

== See also ==
- List of river cruise ships
