= Zosima Shashkov (ship) =

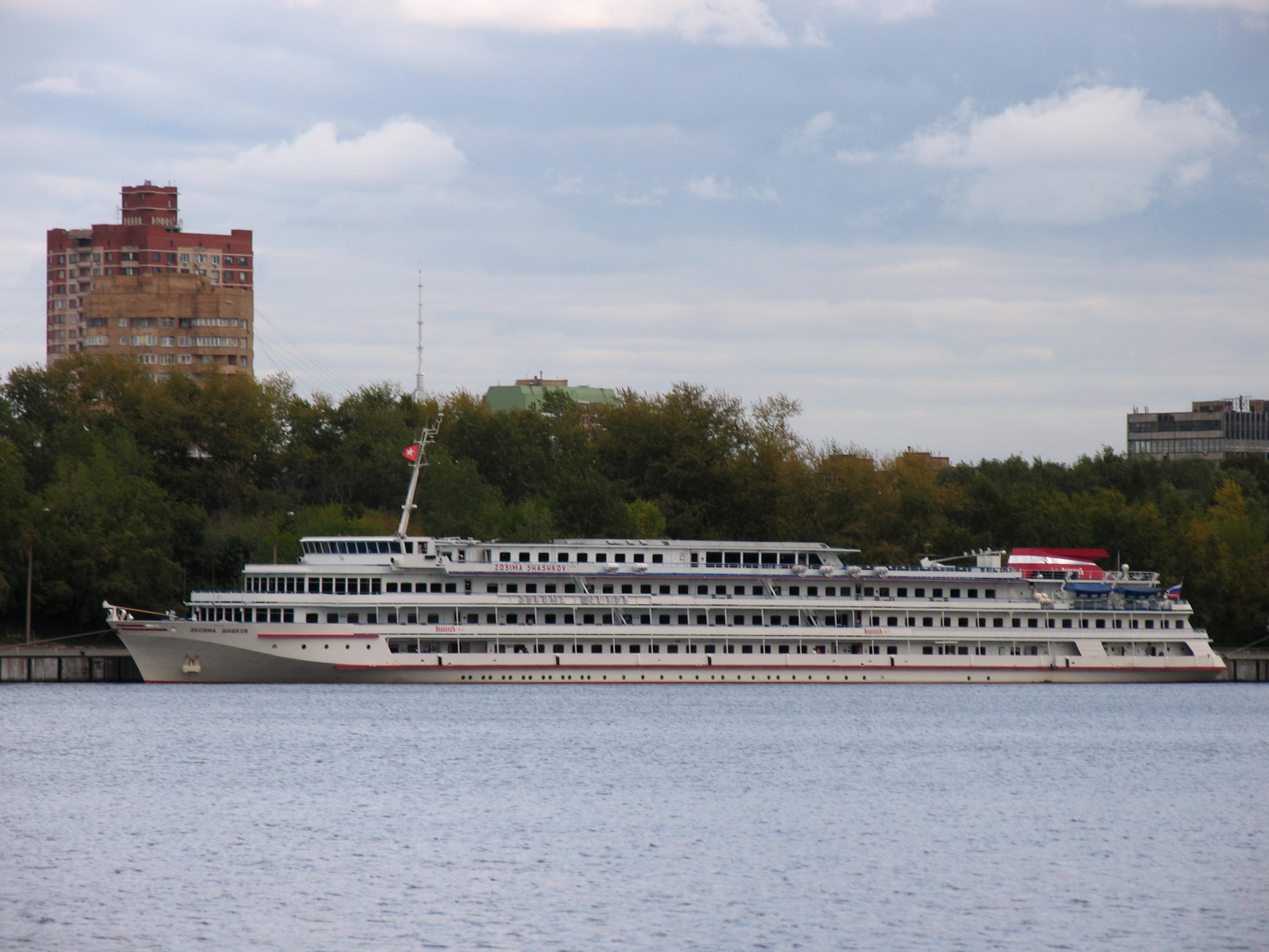
- Zosima Shashkov at Northern River Terminal in Moscow on 15 September 2011

History
- Name: Zosima Shashkov
- Owner: 1986–2012: Volga Shipping Company; 2012–: V. F. Passazhirskie Perevozki (В. Ф. Пассажирские перевозки)
- Operator: Vodohod
- Port of registry: 1987–1994: Gorky, Soviet Union; 1994 onwards: Nizhny Novgorod, Russia
- Route: Saint Petersburg – Moscow
- Builder: VEB Elbewerften Boizenburg/Roßlau, Boizenburg, East Germany
- Yard number: 387
- Completed: July 1986
- In service: 1986
- Identification: Call sign: IMO number: 8620090; RRR Number: 219750; MMSI number: 273368010
- Status: In service

General characteristics
- Class & type: Dmitriy Furmanov-class river cruise ship
- Tonnage: 5,414 GT; 262 DWT
- Displacement: 3,852 tons;
- Length: 129.1 m (424 ft)
- Beam: 16.7 m (55 ft)
- Draught: 2.94 m (9.6 ft)
- Decks: 5 (4 passenger accessible)
- Installed power: 3 x 6ЧРН36/45 (ЭГ70-5)2,208 kilowatts (2,961 hp)
- Propulsion: 3 propellers
- Speed: 25.5 km/h (15.8 mph; 13.8 kn)
- Capacity: 296 passengers (154 cabins)
- Crew: 98

Zosima Shashkov (Russian: Зосима Шашков) is a Dmitriy Furmanov-class (302, BiFa129M) Soviet/Russian river cruise ship, cruising in the Volga – Neva basin between Russian old and new capitals: Moscow and Saint Petersburg. The ship was built by VEB Elbewerften Boizenburg/Roßlau at their shipyard in Boizenburg, East Germany, and entered service in 1986. She was refurbished in 2012. Zosima Shashkov is currently operated by Vodohod, a Russian river cruise line, and her home port is Nizhny Novgorod. The ship is named after the Bolshevik commissar and minister of the Sea and River Fleet of the USSR Zosima Alekseyevich Shashkov.

== Features ==
The ship has one restaurant with panoramic views, night club-restaurant, three bars: Piano Bar, Coffee Bar and Conference Bar, sauna, solarium and onboard boutique.

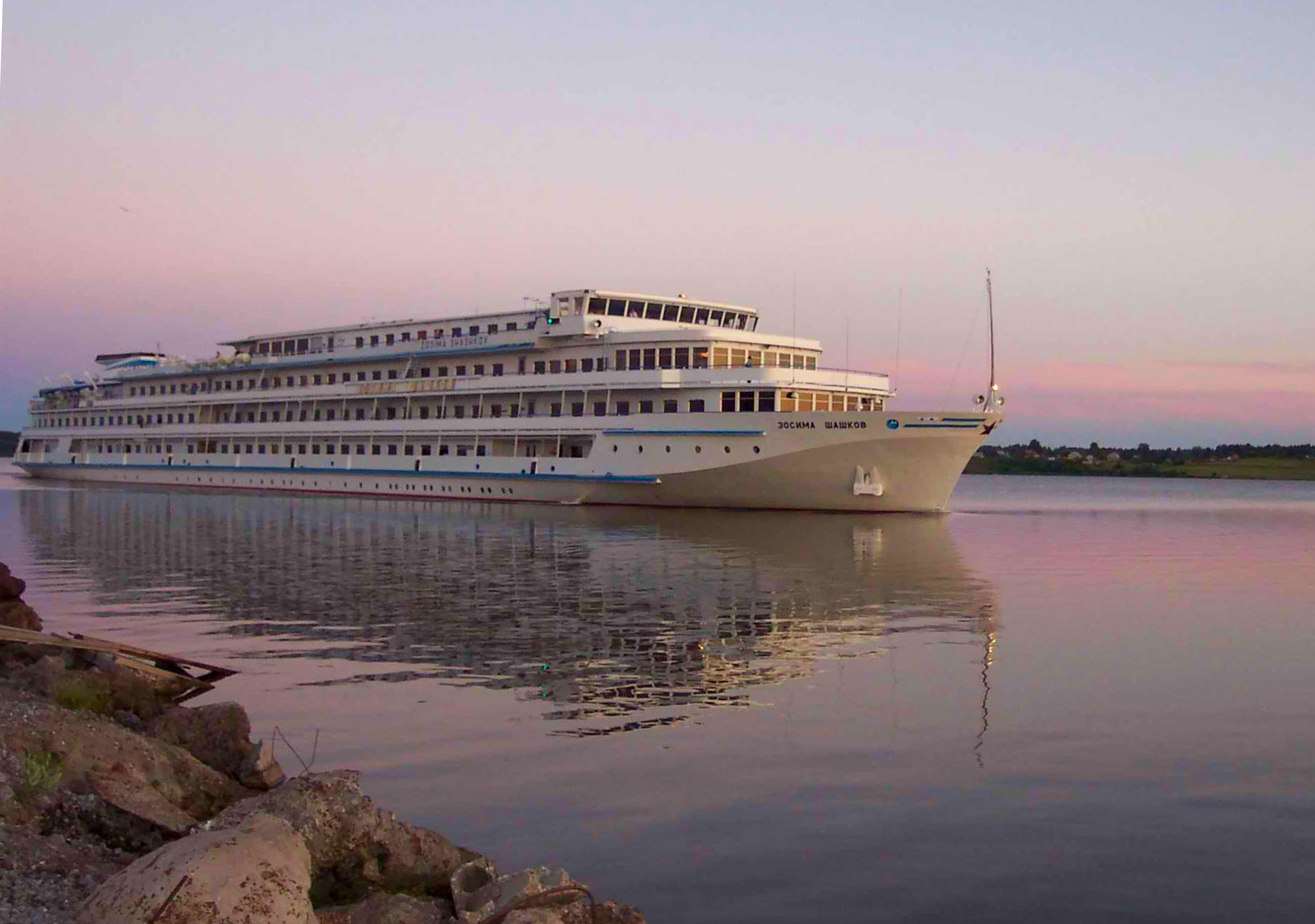
Zosima Shashkov on the Sheksna near Goritsy in 2003

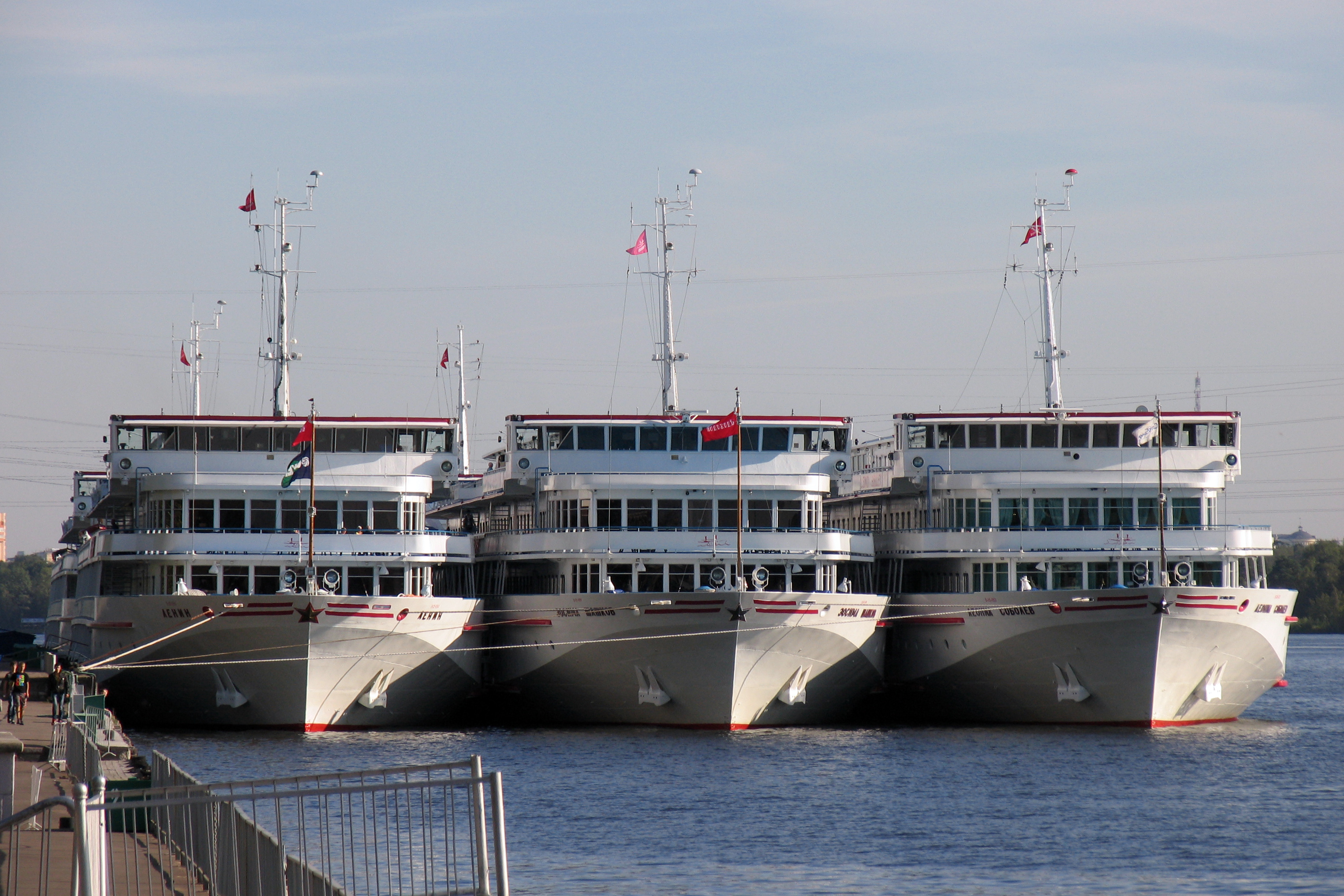
Lenin, Zosima Shashkov and Leonid Sobolev in Moscow on August 22, 2012

== See also ==
- List of river cruise ships
