= Sergey Dyagilev (ship) =

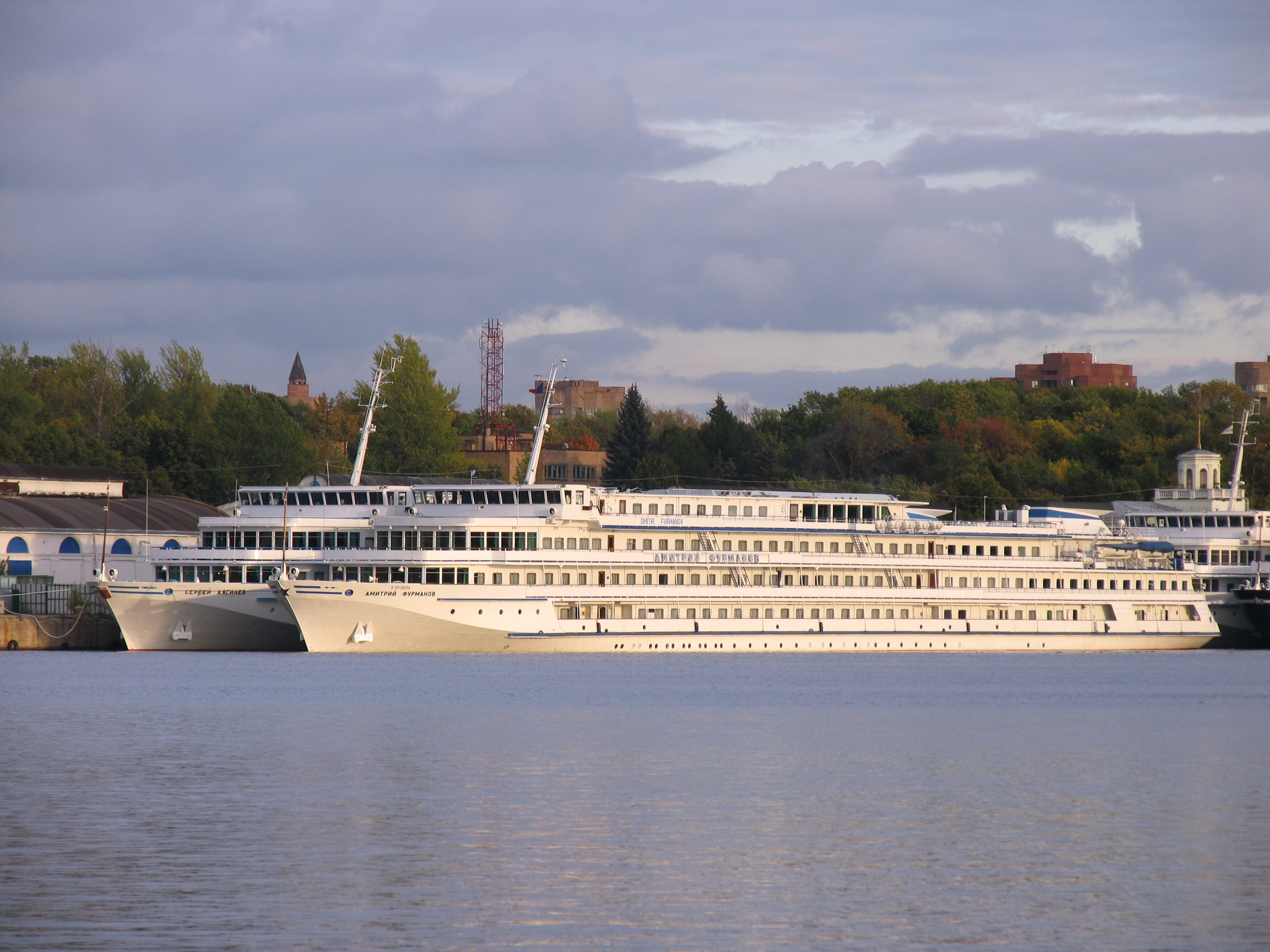
- Sergey Dyagilev at Northern River Terminal in Moscow on 22 September 2011

History
- Name: Novikov-Priboy (1983–2011); Sergey Dyagilev (2011–2017)
- Owner: 1996–2017: Doninturflot
- Operator: Doninturflot
- Port of registry: 1983–1993: Rostov-on-Don, Soviet Union; 1993–2017: Rostov-on-Don, Russia
- Route: Moscow – Saint Petersburg
- Builder: VEB Elbewerften Boizenburg/Roßlau, Boizenburg, East Germany
- Yard number: 380
- Completed: October 1983
- In service: 1983
- Identification: Call sign: UBFL; IMO number: 8326010; MMSI number: 273333450; RRR number: 160221
- Status: In service

General characteristics
- Class & type: Dmitriy Furmanov-class river cruise ship
- Tonnage: 5,414 GT; 480 DWT
- Displacement: 3,853 tons;
- Length: 129.0 m (423.2 ft)
- Beam: 16.7 m (55 ft)
- Draught: 2.88 m (9.4 ft)
- Decks: 5 (4 passenger accessible)
- Installed power: 3 × 6ЧРН36/45 (ЭГ70-5); 2,205 kilowatts (2,957 hp)
- Propulsion: 3 propellers
- Speed: 25.5 km/h (15.8 mph; 13.8 kn)
- Capacity: 284 passengers
- Crew: 92

Sergey Dyagilev (Russian: Сергей Дягилев) is a Dmitriy Furmanov-class (project 302, BiFa129M) Soviet/Russian river cruise ship, cruising in the Volga – Neva basin. The ship was built by VEB Elbewerften Boizenburg/Roßlau at their shipyard in Boizenburg, East Germany, and entered service in 1983. The ship is named after Russian art critic, patron, ballet impresario and founder of the Ballets Russes Sergei Diaghilev.

Her home port is currently Rostov-on-Don. Captain of the Sergey Dyagilev (2011) is Jury Makaryev.

== Features ==
The ship has two restaurants, two bars, two souvenir shops, conference hall, sauna and library.

== See also ==
- List of river cruise ships
