= Lunnaya Sonata =

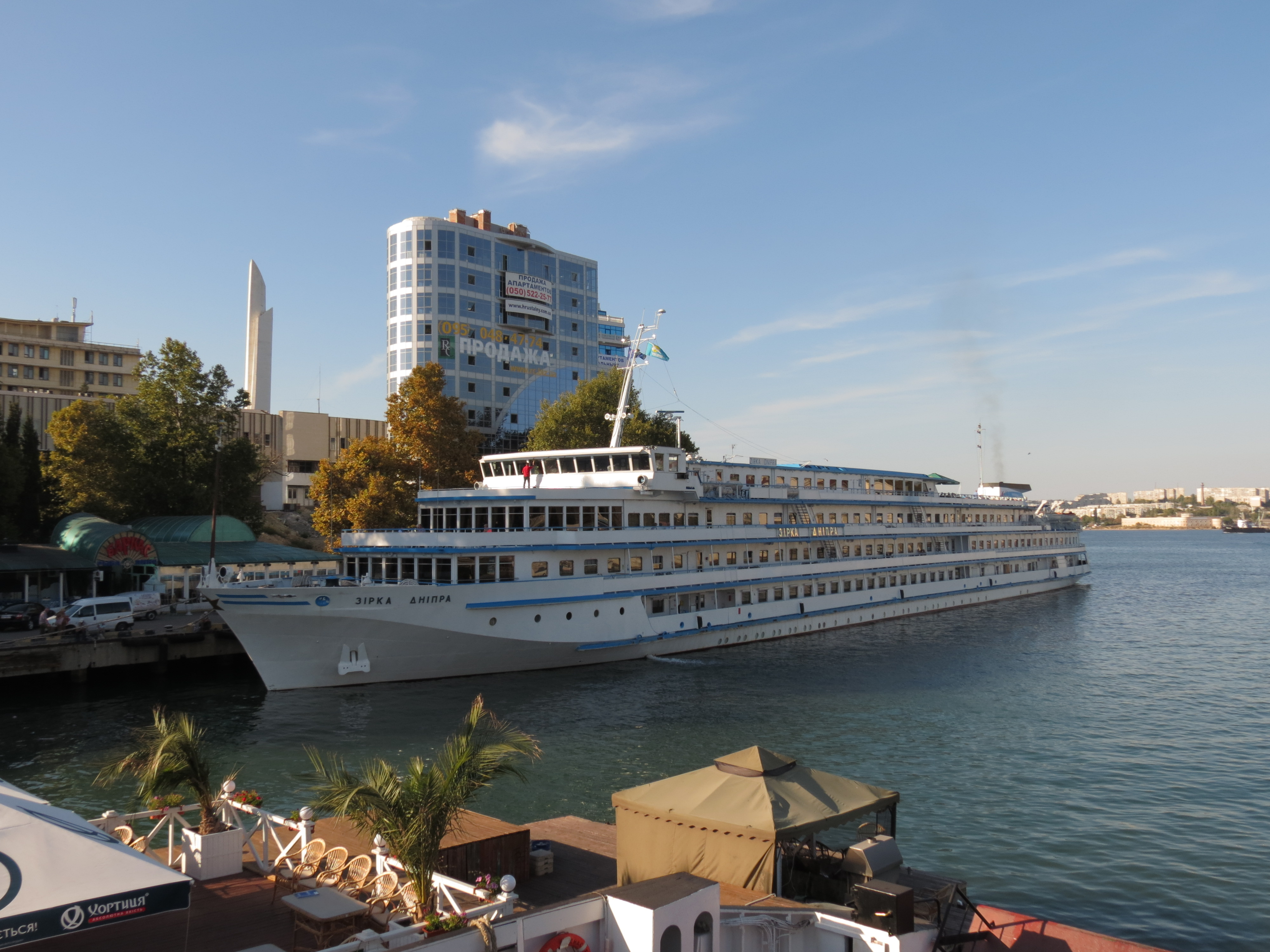
- Zirka Dnipra at Sevastopol, 14 September 2012
- Name: 2017: Zirka Dnepra; 2004–2017: Zirka Dnipra; 1988–2004: Marshal Rybalko
- Owner: 1988–1993: Dnepr Shipping Company (ПО Главречфлот МГО Укрречфлот); 1993–2000: Dnepr Shipping (Укрречфлот); 2000–2004: KSK Kyiv (КСК Киев); 2004–2014: Cruise Company "Chervona Ruta" (ukr. ТОВ Червона Рута); 2020 onwards: SK Sozvezdiye
- Operator: Dnipr Shipping; Chervona Ruta (ООО СК Червона Рута)
- Port of registry: 1988–1993: Kiev, Soviet Union; 1993–2017: Kherson, Ukraine; 2017: Belize, Belize; 2017: Novorossiysk, Russia; 2017 onwards: Nizhny Novgorod, Russia
- Builder: Elbewerften Boizenburg/Roßlau, Boizenburg
- Yard number: 392
- Launched: 14 February 1987
- Completed: 20 April 1988
- In service: 1988
- Identification: Call sign: V3TB8; SRU Number: 2-000191; IMO number: 8707692; MMSI number: 273419950
- Status: In service

General characteristics
- Class & type: Dmitriy Furmanov-class river cruise ship
- Tonnage: 5,475 GT; 262 DWT
- Displacement: 3,852 tons; 3 830 m³
- Length: 129.15 m (423.7 ft)
- Beam: 16.7 m (55 ft)
- Draught: 2.94 m (9.6 ft)
- Decks: 5 (4 passenger accessible)
- Installed power: 3 x 6ЧРН36/45 (ЭГ70-5)2,208 kilowatts (2,961 hp)
- Propulsion: 3 propellers
- Speed: 25.5 km/h (15.8 mph; 13.8 kn)
- Capacity: 280 passengers (154 cabins)
- Crew: 98

Lunnaya Sonata (formerly Marshal Rybalko (until 2005) and Zirka Dnipra (Ukrainian: Зірка Дніпра) (until 2017)) is a Dmitriy Furmanov-class (project 302, BiFa129M) Soviet/Ukrainian river cruise ship, cruising in the Dnepr – Black Sea basin. The ship was built by VEB Elbewerften Boizenburg/Roßlau at their shipyard in Boizenburg, East Germany, and entered service in 1988.

== Ukraine ==
Her home port was Kherson. Zirka Dnipra captain (2012) was Vladimir Bilenko.

== Russia ==
Since 2017 it was sailing under the flag of Belize. Since 2018 it sails under the Russian flag.

== See also ==
- List of river cruise ships
