= Volga Star =

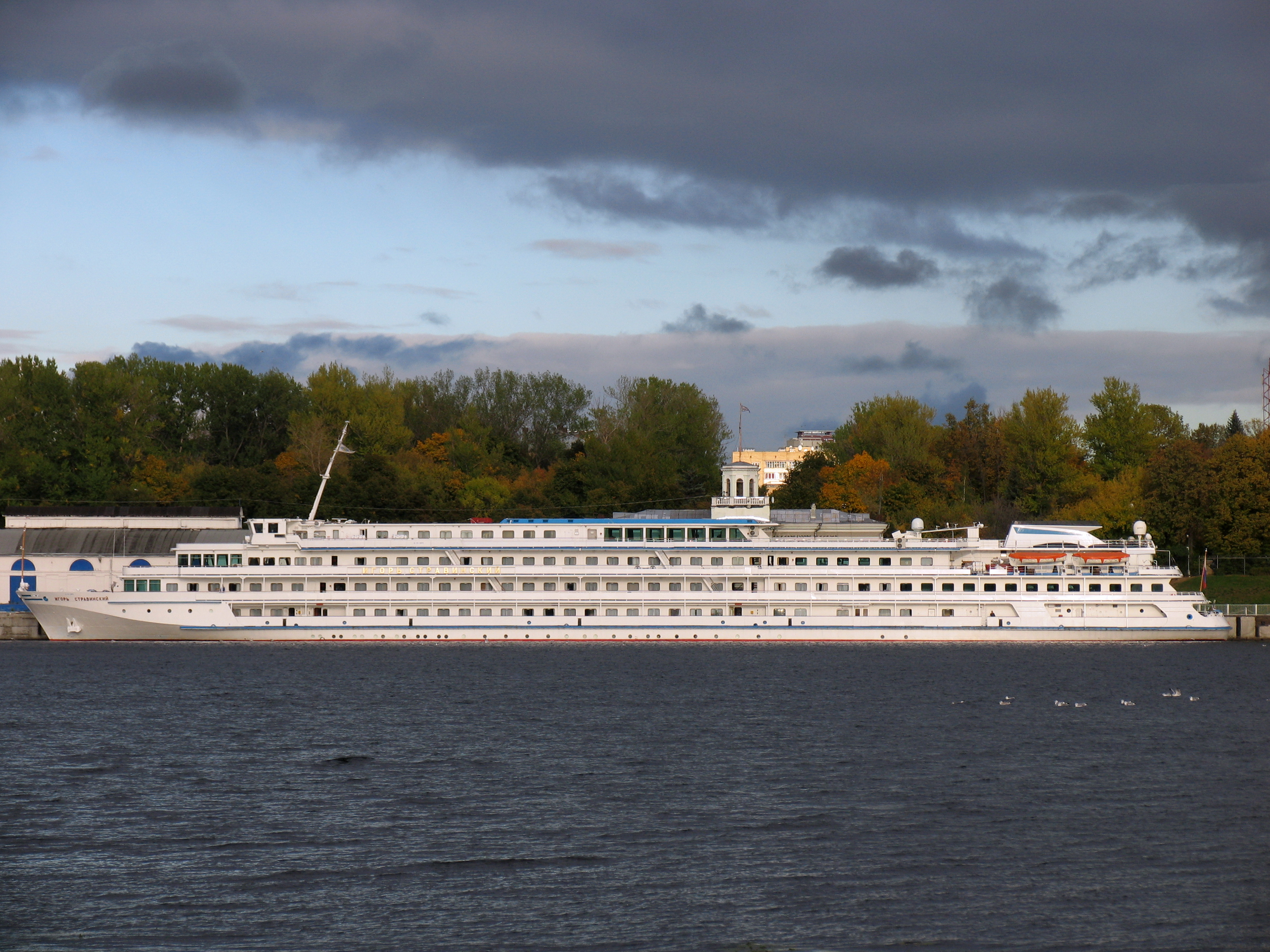
- Igor Stravinskiy at Northern River Terminal in Moscow on 29 September 2011

History
- Name: Akademik Viktor Glushkov (1983–1993); Akademik Vi'ktor Glushkov (1993–2001); Akademik Glushkov (2001–2011); Igor Stravinskiy (2011–2019); Volga Star (2019)
- Owner: 2011–2019: Rechflotinvest
- Operator: Doninturflot
- Port of registry: 1983–1993: Kherson, Soviet Union; 1993–2001: Kherson, Ukraine; 2001–2019: Rostov-on-Don, Russia
- Route: Moscow – Saint Petersburg
- Builder: Elbewerften Boizenburg/Roßlau, Boizenburg
- Yard number: 379
- Completed: August 1983
- In service: 1983
- Identification: RRR number: 160220; IMO number: 8326008
- Status: In service

General characteristics
- Class & type: Dmitriy Furmanov-class river cruise ship
- Tonnage: 5,414 GT; 480 DWT
- Displacement: 3,830 tons;
- Length: 129.1 m (424 ft)
- Beam: 16.7 m (55 ft)
- Draught: 2.88 m (9.4 ft)
- Decks: 5 (4 passenger accessible)
- Installed power: 3 x 6ЧРН36/45 (ЭГ70-5)2,208 kilowatts (2,961 hp)
- Propulsion: 3 propellers
- Speed: 25.5 km/h (15.8 mph; 13.8 kn)
- Capacity: 250 passengers
- Crew: 100

The Volga Star (Russian: Волга Стар) is a Dmitriy Furmanov-class (project 302, BiFa129M) Soviet/Russian river cruise ship, cruising in the Volga – Neva basin. The ship was built by VEB Elbewerften Boizenburg/Roßlau at their shipyard in Boizenburg, East Germany, and entered service in 1983. From 2011 to February 2019 the ship was named after Russian, and later French and American, composer, pianist and conductor Igor Stravinsky.

Her home port is currently Rostov-on-Don. Captain of the Igor Stravinskiy (2011) is Gennady Cherkashin.

== Features ==
The ship has two restaurants, "Vena" and "Sankt-Peterburg", two bars, conference hall, sauna and library.

== See also ==
- List of river cruise ships
