= Konstantin Simonov (ship) =

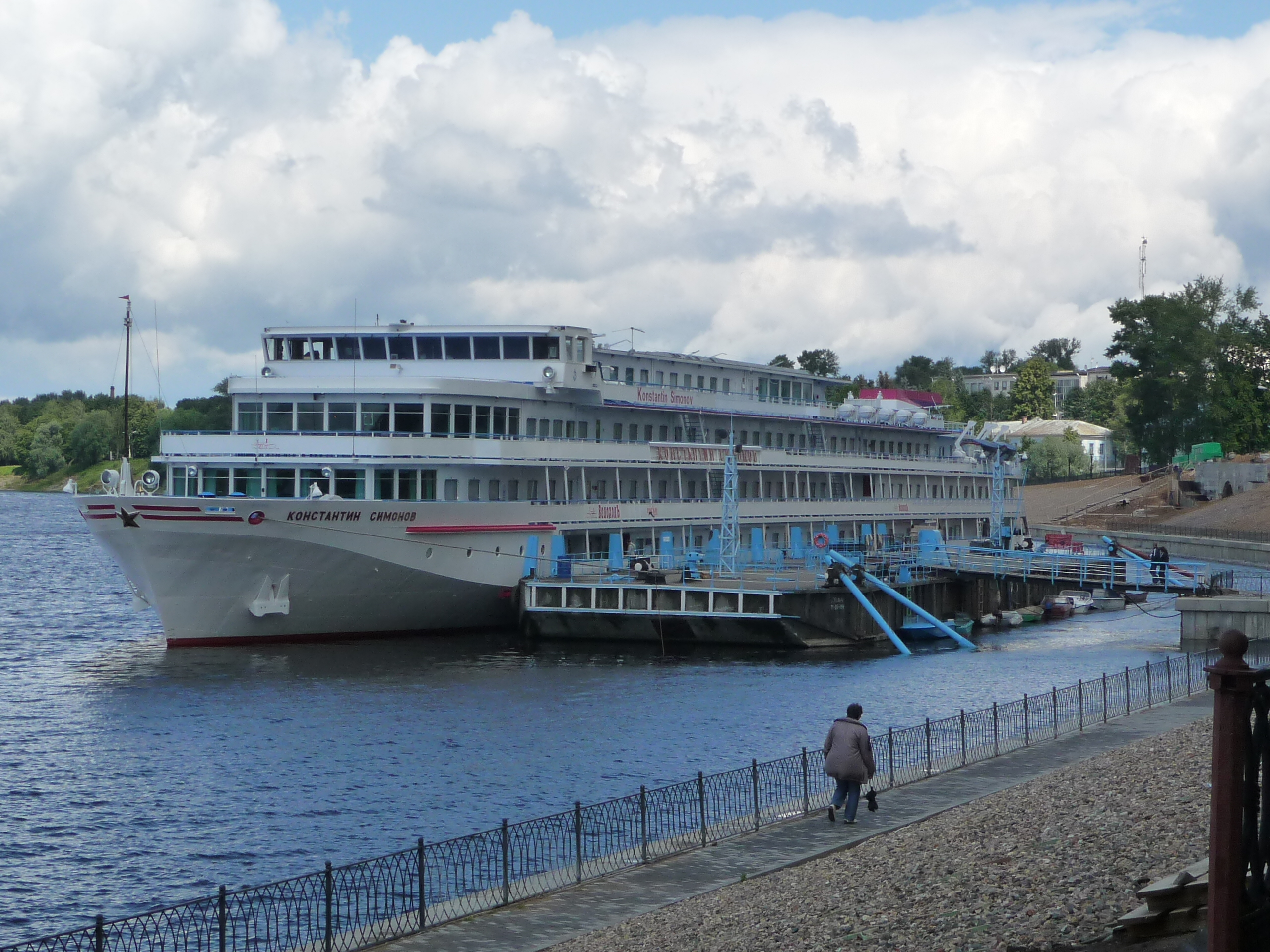
- Konstantin Simonov moored at berth on the Volga River in Uglich

History
- Name: Konstantin Simonov (1984–2015)
- Owner: 2012–2015: Vodohod
- Operator: 2012–2015: Vodohod
- Port of registry: 1984–1994: Gorky, Soviet Union; 1994–2015: Nizhny Novgorod, Russia
- Route: Moscow – Saint Petersburg
- Builder: VEB Elbewerften Boizenburg/Roßlau, Boizenburg, East Germany
- Yard number: 382
- Completed: September 1984
- In service: 1984
- Identification: Call sign: UAUC4; RRR number: 160223; IMO number: 8422618; MMSI number: 273363090
- Status: In service

General characteristics
- Class & type: Dmitriy Furmanov-class river cruise ship
- Tonnage: 6,310 GT; 492 DWT
- Displacement: 3,852 tons;
- Length: 129.05 m (423.4 ft)
- Beam: 16.7 m (55 ft)
- Draught: 2.9 m (9.5 ft)
- Decks: 5 (4 passenger accessible)
- Installed power: 3 × 6ЧРН36/45 (ЭГ70-5); 2,208 kilowatts (2,961 hp)
- Propulsion: 3 propellers
- Speed: 25.5 km/h (15.8 mph; 13.8 kn)
- Capacity: 298 passengers
- Crew: 129

The Konstantin Simonov (Russian: Константин Симонов) is a Dmitriy Furmanov-class (project 302, BiFa129M) Soviet/Russian river cruise ship, cruising in the Volga–Neva basin. The ship was built by VEB Elbewerften Boizenburg/Roßlau at their shipyard in Boizenburg, East Germany, and entered service in 1984. The ship is named after Soviet writer and poet Konstantin Simonov.

Her home port is currently Nizhny Novgorod. Captain of the Konstantin Simonov (2014) is Aleksandr Kazakov.

== Features ==
The ship has two restaurants "Neva" and "Volga", two bars, souvenir store, solarium, conference hall and sauna.

== See also ==
- List of river cruise ships
