= Simfoniya Severa =

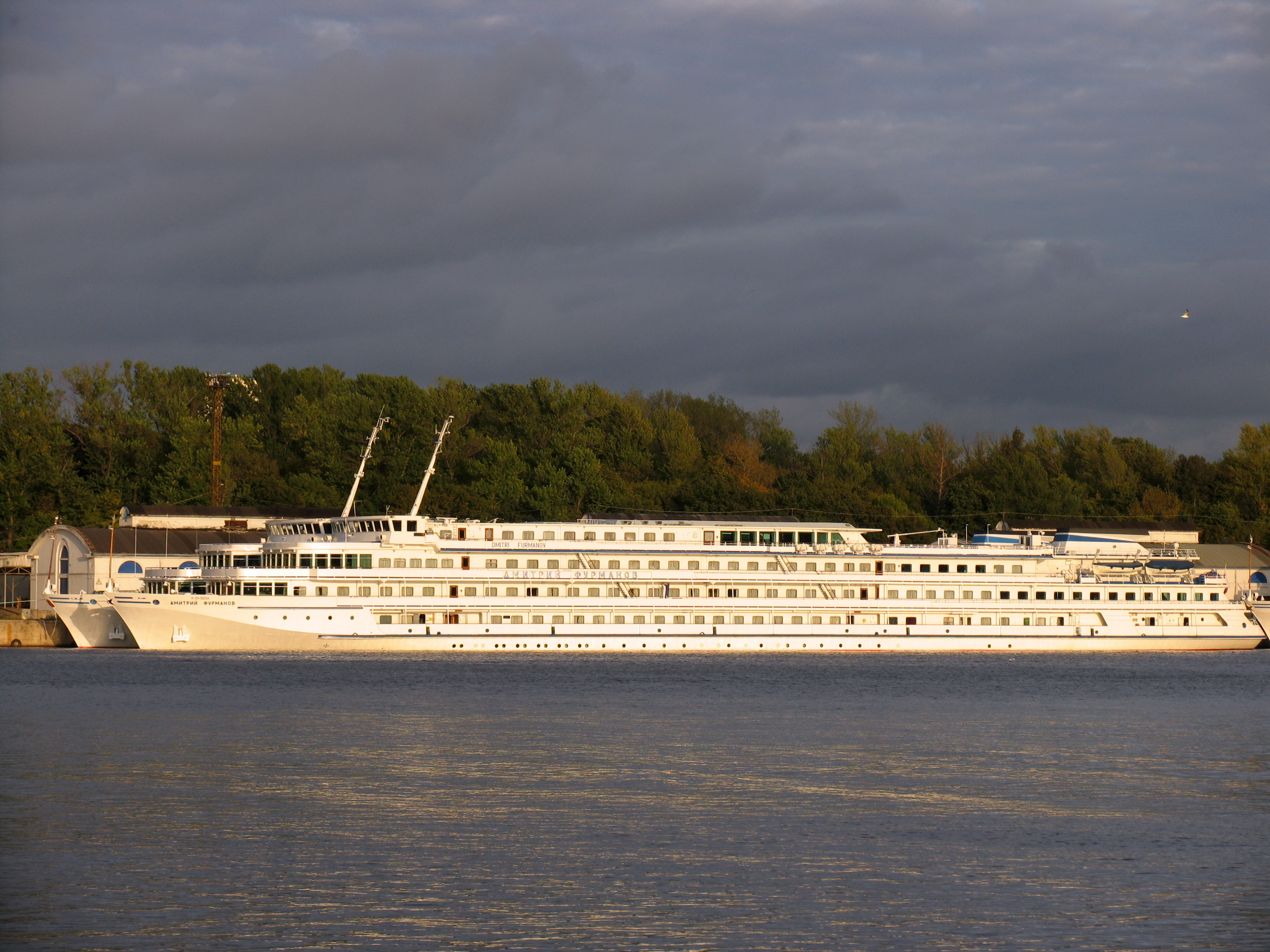
- Dmitriy Furmanov at Northern River Terminal in Moscow on September 22, 2011

History

Russia
- Name: Dmitriy Furmanov
- Owner: 1983–1993: Kama Shipping Company (ГП Камское речное пароходство МРФ РСФСР); 1993–2001: Kama Shipping Company (ОАО СК Камское речное пароходство); 2001–: Kama Tri Shipping Company Ltd. (Кама Три Шиппинг Ко.Лтд)
- Operator: Azurit; (ООО Азурит)
- Port of registry: 1983–1993: Perm, Soviet Union; 1993–2014: Perm, Russia
- Builder: VEB Elbewerften Boizenburg/Roßlau, Boizenburg,, East Germany
- Yard number: 378
- Completed: June 1983
- In service: 1983
- Identification: Call sign: IMO number: 8218598; RRR number: 160219
- Status: In service

General characteristics
- Class & type: Dmitriy Furmanov-class river cruise ship
- Tonnage: 5,414 GT; 301 DWT
- Displacement: 3,852 tons;
- Length: 129.1 m (423 ft 7 in)
- Beam: 16.7 m (54 ft 9 in)
- Draught: 2.9 m (9 ft 6 in)
- Decks: 5 (4 passenger accessible)
- Installed power: 3 x 6ЧРН36/45 (ЭГ70-5) 2,208 kW (2,961 hp)
- Propulsion: 3 propellers
- Speed: 25.5 km/h (15.8 mph; 13.8 kn)
- Capacity: 326 passengers
- Crew: 98

Dmitriy Furmanov (Russian: Дмитрий Фурманов) is the lead ship of the Dmitriy Furmanov-class (project 302, BiFa129M) Soviet/Russian river cruise ship, cruising in the Volga – Neva basin. The ship was built by VEB Elbewerften Boizenburg/Roßlau at their shipyard in Boizenburg, East Germany, and entered service in 1983. The ship is named after the famous Bolshevik commissar and writer of the book Chapayev about Vasily Chapayev, a Red Army officer and a hero of the Civil War.

Her home port is currently Perm.

== Features ==
The ship has two restaurants, three bars, the lounge on the Upper deck, conference hall and souvenir shop.

== See also ==
- List of river cruise ships
- Ukraina-class motorship
