= Aleksandra (1991) =

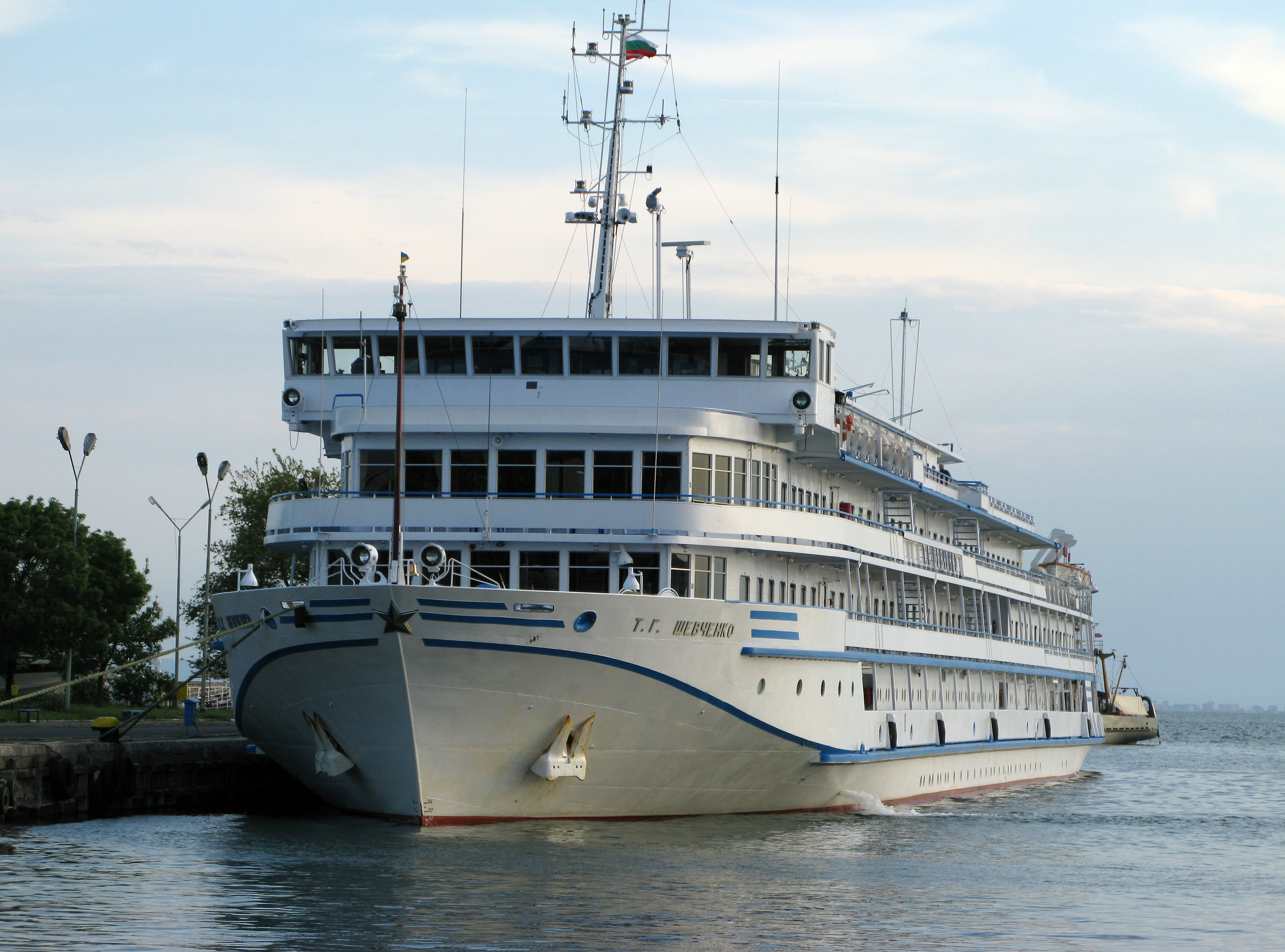
- T. G. Shevchenko at pier in Nesebar

History
- Name: Aleksandra; 1991–1992: Taras Shevchenko; 1992–2021: T. G. Shevchenko
- Owner: 1991–1993: Ukrrechflot; 1993–2010: Ukrrichflot; 2010–2016: Caspiy Ak Jhelken; 2016–2018: SK Ark; 2018 onwards: Doninturflot
- Operator: Sochina
- Port of registry: 1991–1993: Kherson, Soviet Union; 1993–2010: Kherson, Ukraine; 2010–2016: Aktau, Kazakhstan; 2016–2018: Novorossiysk, Russia; 2018–2021: Taganrog, Russia; 2021 onwards: Rostov-on-Don, Russia
- Builder: Elbewerft Boizenburg, Boizenburg
- Yard number: 303
- Launched: 6 January 1990
- Completed: 4 October 1991
- In service: 1991
- Identification: Call sign UBDM2; IMO number: 8925036; MMSI number: 273341690; RSU Number: 2-040043; RRR Number 225815
- Status: In service, hotelship

General characteristics
- Class & type: Dmitriy Furmanov-class river cruise ship
- Tonnage: 5,495 GT; 470 tonnes deadweight (DWT)
- Length: 129.15 m (423 ft 9 in)
- Beam: 16.7 m (54 ft 9 in)
- Draught: 2.94 m (9 ft 8 in)
- Decks: 5 (4 passenger accessible)
- Installed power: 3 x 6ЧРН36/45 2,015 kilowatts (2,702 hp)
- Propulsion: 3 propellers
- Speed: 25.5 km/h (15.8 mph; 13.8 kn)
- Capacity: 258 passengers (140 cabins)
- Crew: 98

Aleksandra (Russian: Александра) (formerly Taras Shevchenko, T. G. Shevchenko) is a Dmitriy Furmanov-class (project 302, BiFa129MK) Soviet/Ukrainian/Kazakh/Russian river cruise ship, cruising in the Neva – Volga – Don – Dnepr – Black Sea basin, from Nesebar on the Bulgarian Black Sea Coast and Constanța to Saint Petersburg on the Baltic Sea in Russia, and since November 2010 hotelship in the Kurmangazy oil field in the Kazakh section of the Caspian Sea. The ship was built by Elbewerft Boizenburg at their shipyard in Boizenburg, Germany, named after Ukrainian painter and poet Taras Shevchenko and entered service in 1991. Her home port is currently Rostov-on-Don.

== Features ==
The ship has restaurant, two bars: Panorama and Sky, and souvenir shop.

== See also ==
- List of river cruise ships
