= Sergei Shashkov =

Russian footballer

Personal information
- Full name: Sergei Sergeyevich Shashkov
- Date of birth: 7 December 1972 (age 53)
- Place of birth: Kurgan, Kurgan Oblast, RSFSR, USSR
- Height: 1.78 m (5 ft 10 in)
- Positions: Forward; midfielder

Youth career
- DYuSSh-3 Kurgan

Senior career*
Years	Team	Apps	(Gls)
1988	FC Karbyshevets Kurgan		
1989	FC Yermak Kurgan		
1989–1993	FC Sibir Kurgan	127	(12)
1994	FC Lokomotiv Nizhny Novgorod	12	(0)
1995	FC Torpedo Arzamas	22	(1)
1996	FC Torpedo Volzhsky	14	(0)
1996	FC Kavkazkabel Prokhladny	11	(0)
1998	FC Zvyozdy Dynamo Kurgan		
1999	FC Irtysh Tobolsk	9	(0)
1999	FC Metallurg-Metiznik Magnitogorsk	12	(2)
2000	FC Spartak Kurgan	14	(1)
2001	FC Gazovik Orenburg	0	(0)
2002	FC Druzhba Arzamas (amateur)		
2007	FC TEKS Ivanteyevka		
- * Club domestic league appearances and goals

Sergei Sergeyevich Shashkov (Russian: Сергей Сергеевич Шашков; born 7 December 1972) is a former Russian football player.
