= Elbewerft Boizenburg =

German shipbuilding company

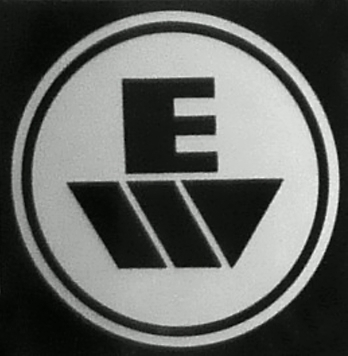
- Company type: 1948–1990 VEB; 1990–1997 GmbH
- Industry: Shipbuilding
- Founded: 1948
- Headquarters: Boizenburg, Germany
- Products: Fishcutters; River cruise ships Cargo ships
- Parent: DMS AG

Elbewerft Boizenburg was a German shipbuilding company, headquartered in Boizenburg. Since 1990 it has been part of the Deutschen Maschinen- und Schiffbau AG (DMS AG).

== History ==
The boat workshop was founded by Franz Jürgen Lemm in 1793. The first steel ship was launched in 1895. The shipyard developed quickly, from Elbewerft, Boizenburger Werft to Thomsen & Co, in 1938. After World War II the shipyard was founded as VVW Elbewerft Boizenburg VEB on the basis of Thomsen & Co and after 1945 and the separation of Germany, the shipyard focused on markets in Eastern Europe. In 1970, after fusion with shipyard in Roßlau, Elbewerft Boizenburg became part of VEB Elbewerften Boizenburg/Roßlau, which was one of the most renowned state-owned shipyards of the German Democratic Republic.

== Ships built by VEB Elbewerften Boizenburg/Roßlau (selection) ==
=== Fishcutters ===
- Typ Havanna
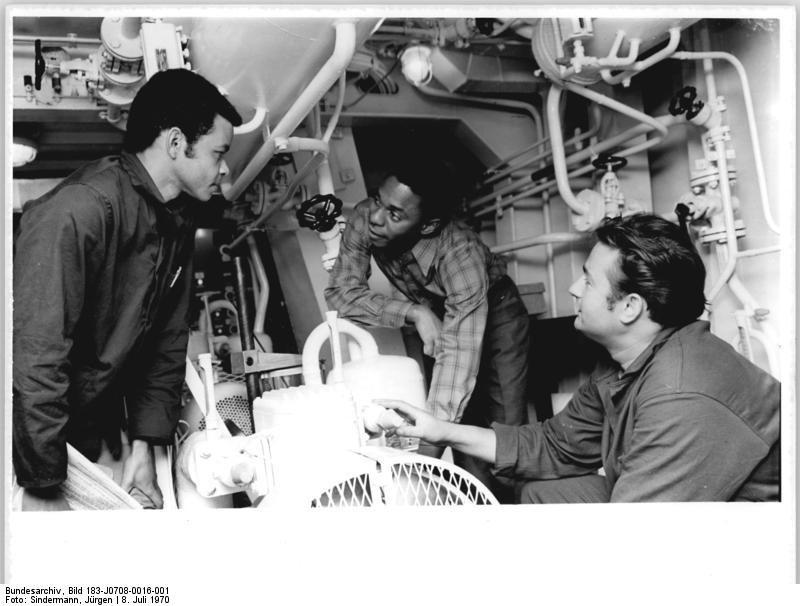
Young workers from Cuba

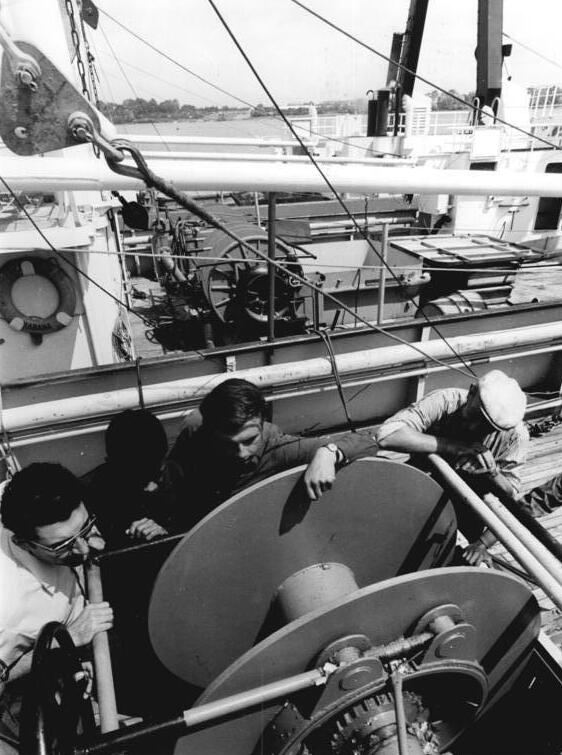
Fishcutter for Cuba

=== Container ships ===
- Typ CBK

=== River cruise ships ===
- Vladimir Ilyich (1975)
- 30 Let GDR (1980)
- Dmitriy Furmanov (1983)
- Igor Stravinskiy (1983)
- Sergey Dyagilev (1983)
- Aleksey Surkov (1984)
- Konstantin Simonov (1984)
- Sergey Kirov (1987)
- Marshal Rybalko (1988)
- Taras Shevchenko (1991)
- Konstantin Stanyukovich (1991)
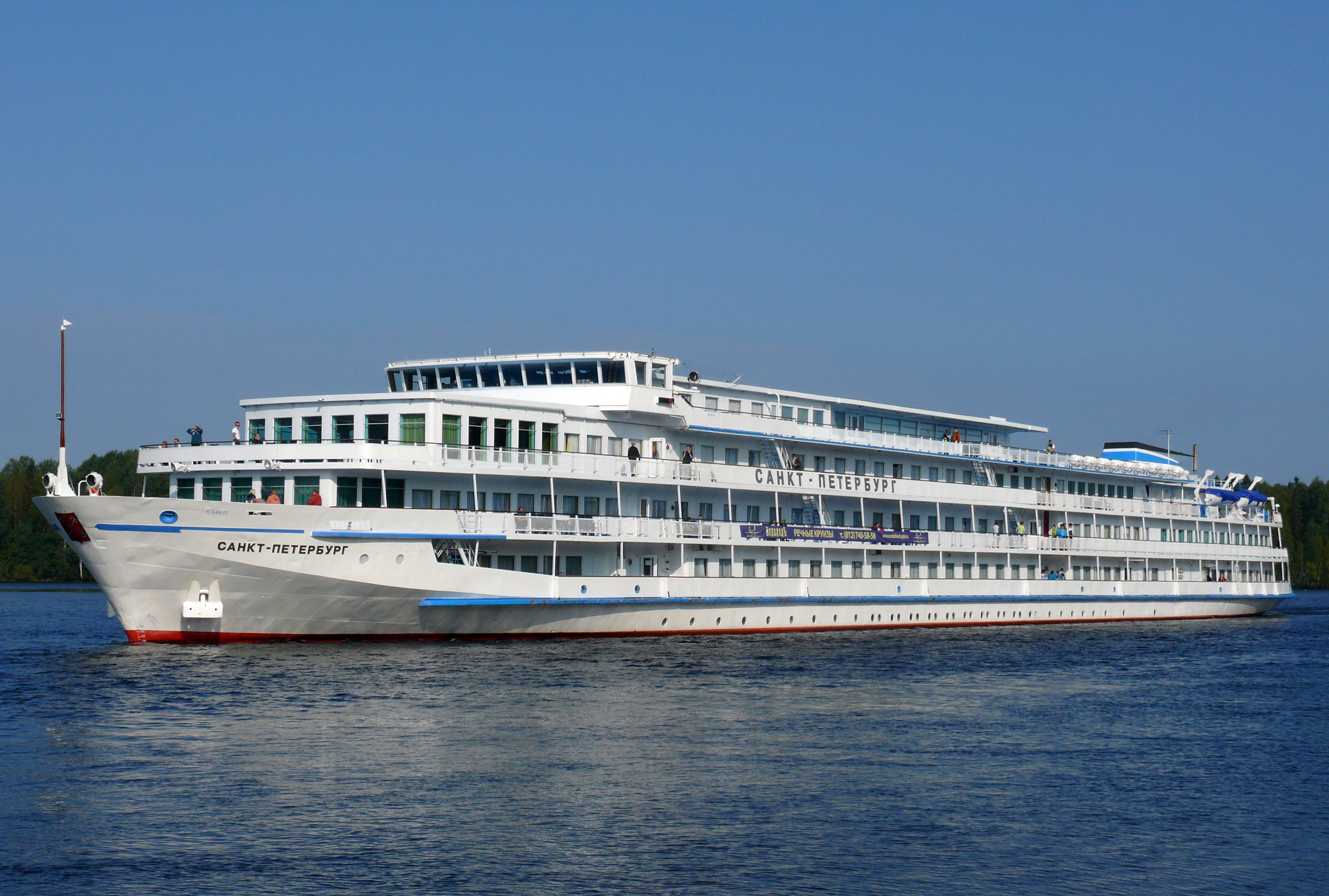
Sankt-Peterburg (originally, the Vladimir Ilyich)

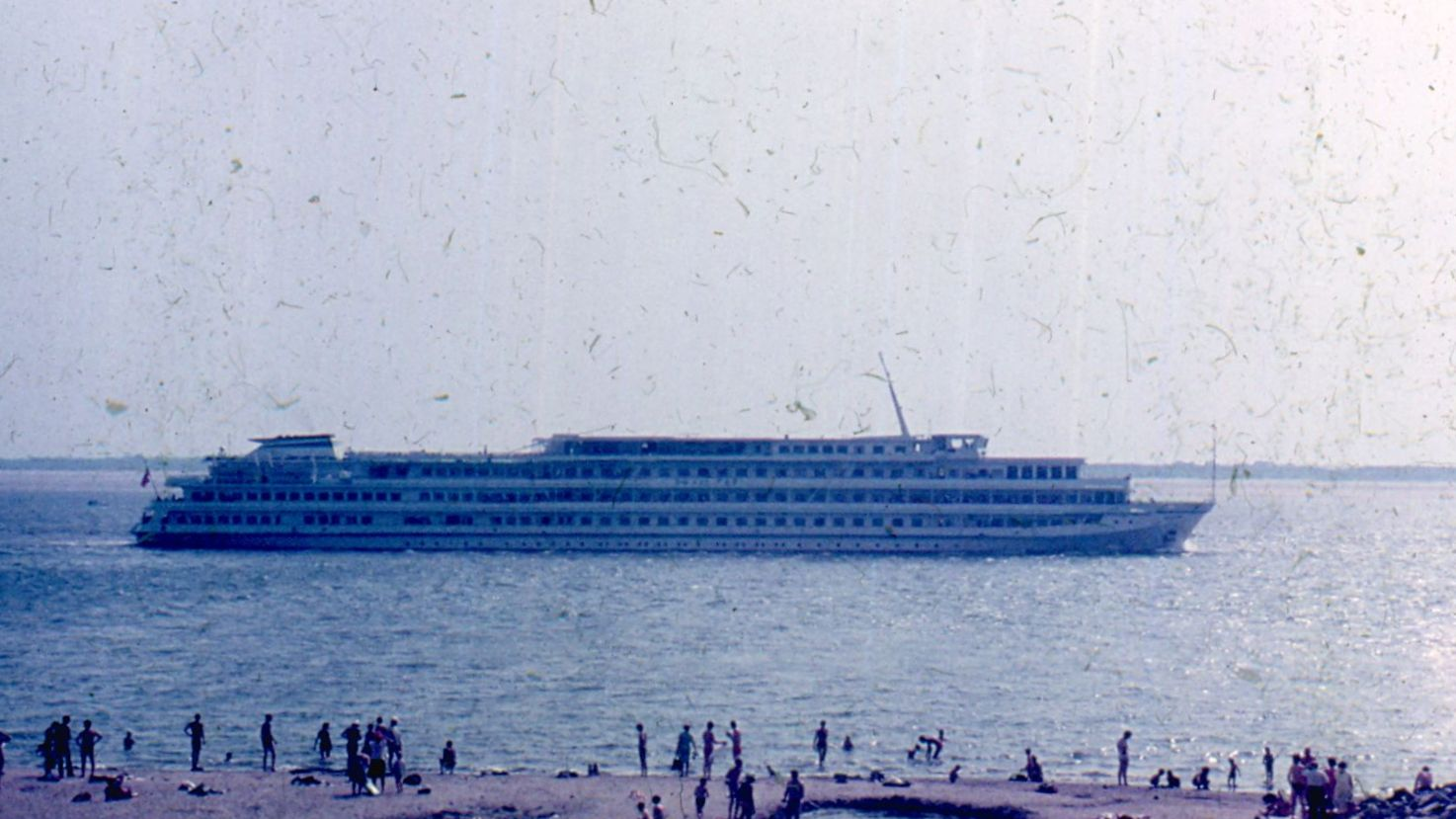
30 Let GDR on the Amur River in the Soviet Far East

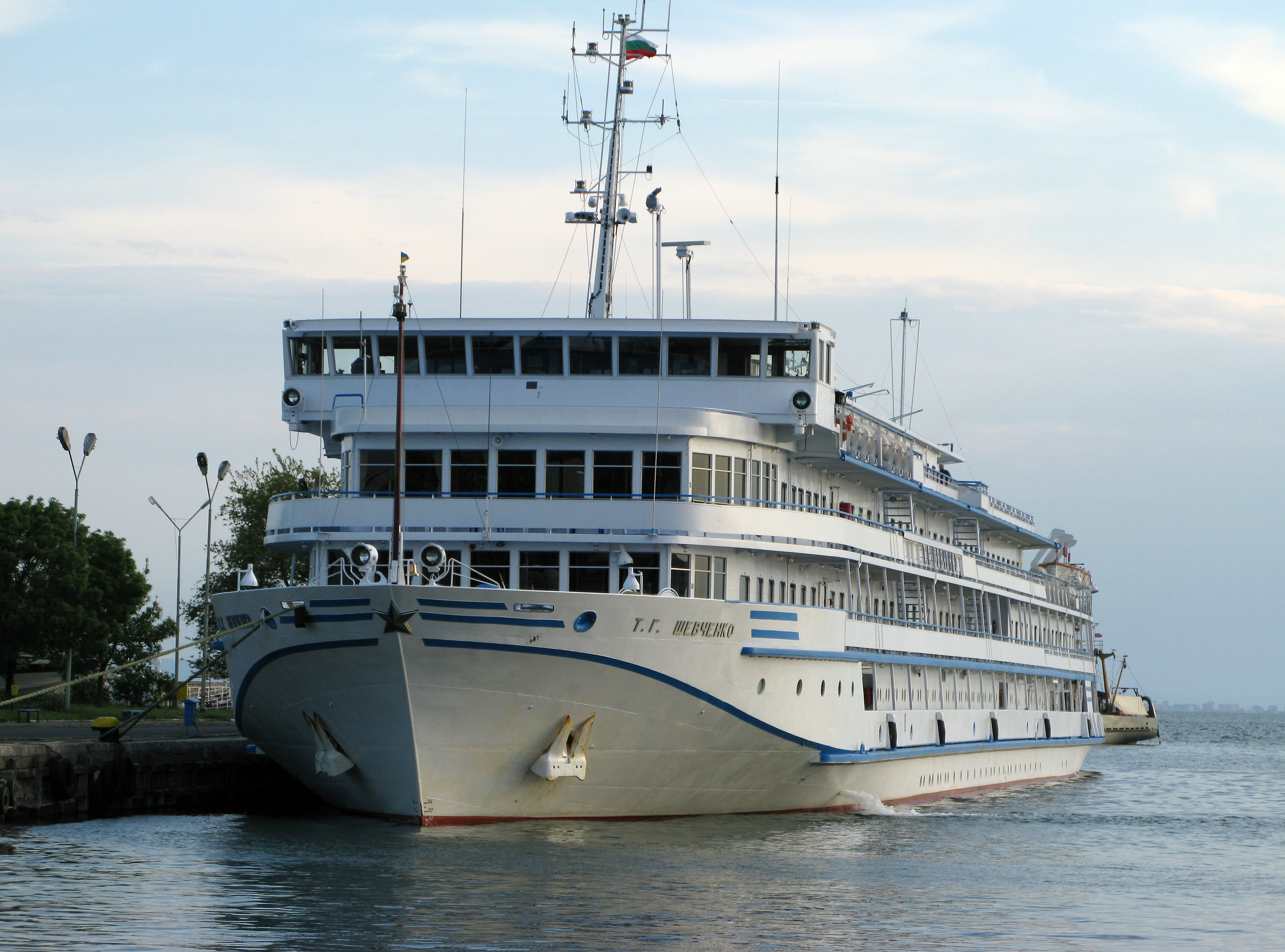
T. G. Shevchenko at pier in Nesebar

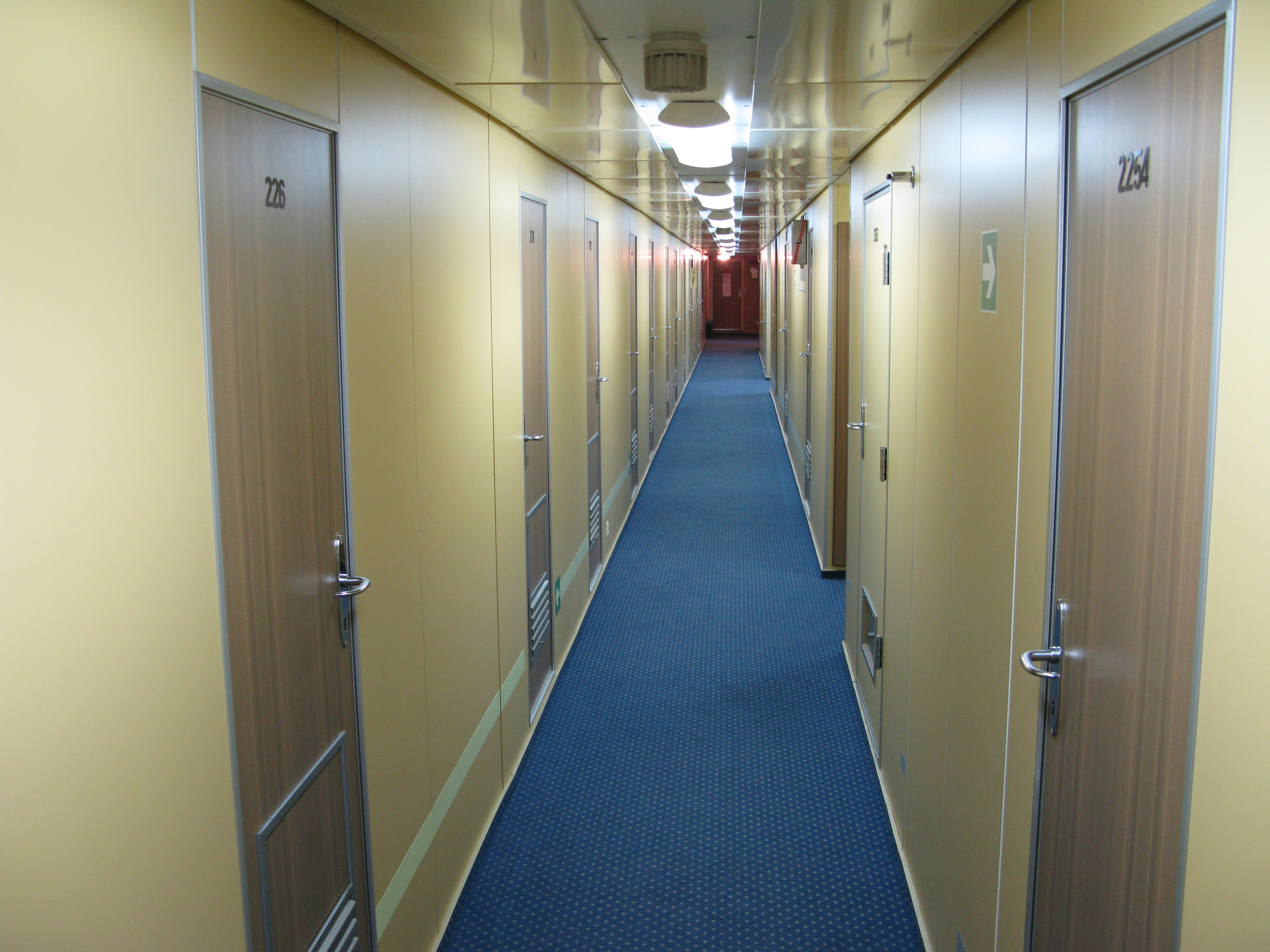
Ship's passageway

== See also ==
- Nordic Yards Wismar
