= Katajanokan ympärijuoksu =

Katajanokan ympärijuoksu (Skatudden runt in Swedish) is an annual running event in Katajanokka, Helsinki, Finland. It is open for everyone who lives in Katajanokka or has relatives living there.

The running event has several categories according to age and sex. Children have separate categories for boys and girls, and are divided into two or three age groups. Adults (which also allows teenagers) have only one category, but results are separate for men and women.

The length of the running varies according to category. Toddlers run once around the inside of a walled-in sporting field. Schoolchildren run around the entire sporting area, younger children once, older children twice. Adults and teenagers run around half of the entire Katajanokka district.

There are no monetary prizes for the event, but winners get medals, and the winner of the adults category gets a trophy. Results are also published in the annual Katajanokan kaiku magazine.
