= Katajanokka Casino =

Building in Helsinki, Finland

Coordinates: 60°10′9.35″N 024°57′55.01″E

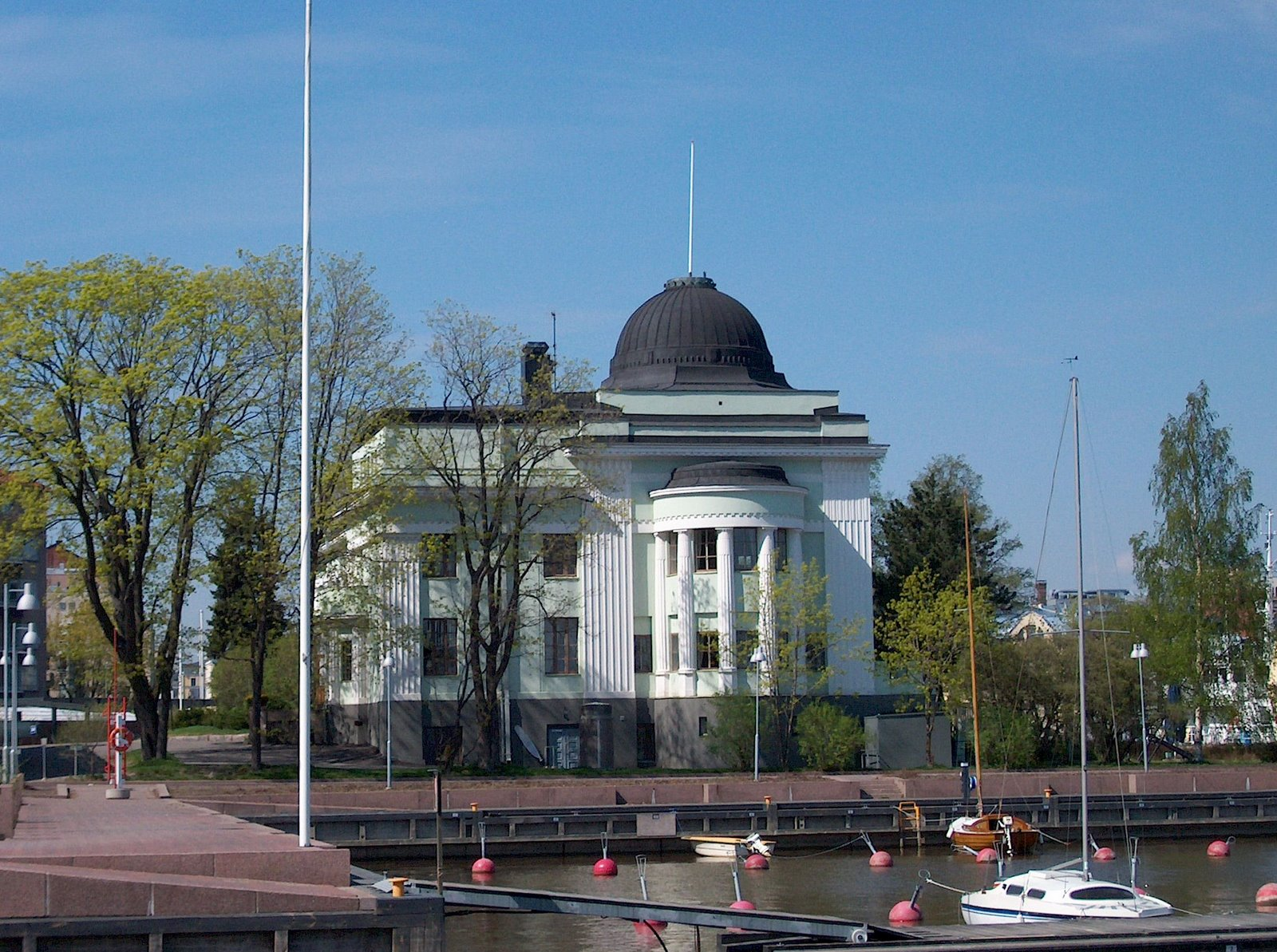
Katajanokka Casino, Helsinki

Katajanokka Casino is a restaurant and function venue in the Katajanokka neighbourhood of Helsinki. The building is located upon a promontory on the north side of the island next to the marina. It is not a casino in the sense of a gambling establishment.

== History ==
Designed by the architect A. Nyberg and completed in 1913, it was created for the use of Russian imperial officers during the period of the Grand Duchy. The building was seized by revolutionary forces in 1917 and, since Finnish independence, the place has become a favourite venue for various Finnish military organizations. During the time of Russian Revolution before the World War I, 15 Russian soldiers were shot in front of the Casino building.

Since World War II, the building has gone through various repairs and restorations. In its present state, Katajanokka Casino very much resembles its original fin-de-siècle style and appearance.
