= Katajanokka =

Coordinates: 60°10′01″N 024°58′06″E

Katajanokka Skatudden
- Helsinki Subdivision
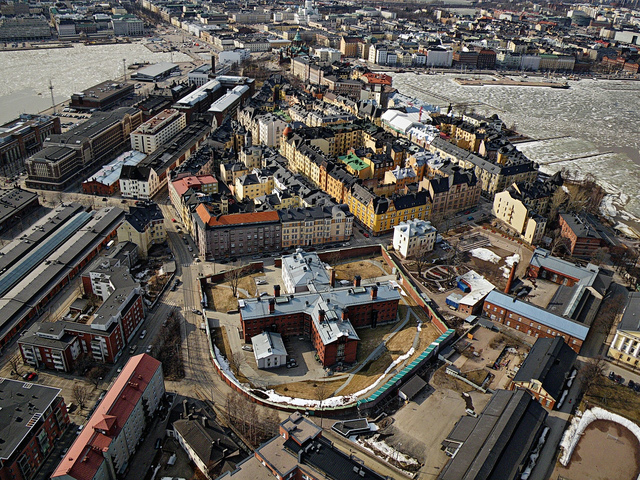
- Aerial view of Katajanokka

- Position of Katajanokka within Helsinki
- Country: Finland
- Region: Uusimaa
- Sub-region: Greater Helsinki
- Municipality: Helsinki
- District: Southern
- Subdivision regions: none
- Area: 0.57 km^{2} (0.22 sq mi)
- Population (2005): 4,167
  - Density: 7,244/km^{2} (18,760/sq mi)
- Postal codes: 00160
- Subdivision number: 08
- Neighbouring subdivisions: Kruununhaka; Kaartinkaupunki

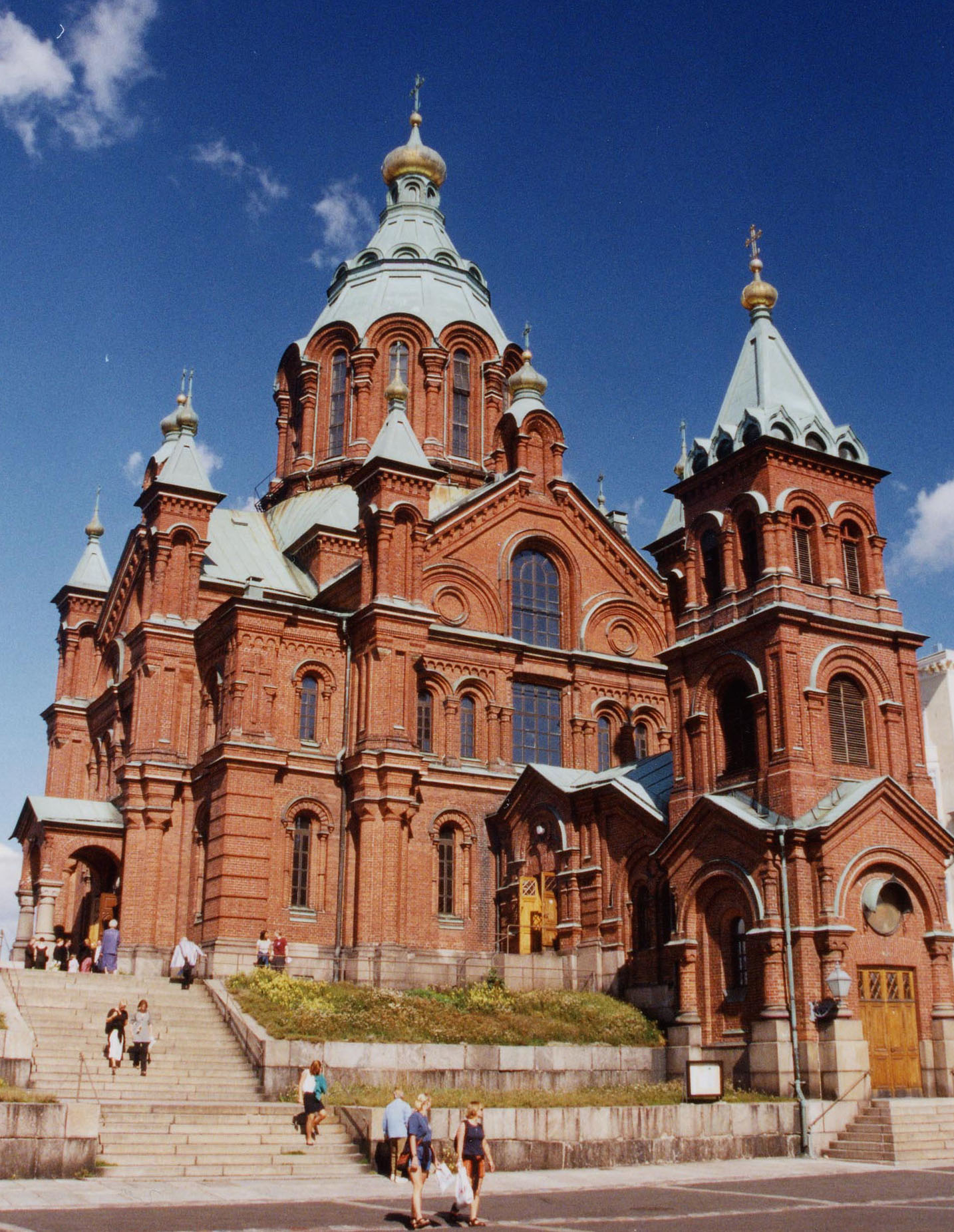
Uspenski Cathedral

Katajanokka (Finnish: [ˈkɑtɑjɑˌnokːɑ]; Swedish: Skatudden) is a neighbourhood of Helsinki, Finland, with around 5,000 inhabitants in 2023. The district is located adjacent to the immediate downtown area, though in the first major town plan for Helsinki from the mid-18th century, the area fell outside the fortifications planned to encircle the city.

Originally, Katajanokka was a headland of the Helsinki peninsula but is now technically an island, as a small canal was dug across the base of the headland in the 19th century. There are four bridges across the canal connecting Katajanokka with the Helsinki Market Square and Aleksanterinkatu area in mainland Helsinki.

Buildings in Katajanokka include the former Katajanokka prison (now a Tribute Portfolio hotel by Marriott), the Uspenski Cathedral, the Katajanokka Casino, Wanha Satama, the Stora Enso head office designed by Alvar Aalto, the building of the Ministry for Foreign Affairs and the Katajanokka Terminal used by Viking Line. Katajanokka forms a central part of the South Harbour. In the 19th and 20th centuries Katajanokka was known as an important hub for goods transport and even became the largest import harbour in Finland, but since then its role as a residential area has increased. Katajanokka is served by the Helsinki tram lines 4 and 5.

Katajanokka is one of the most distinguished neighbourhoods in Helsinki. Katajanokka's residents have included former Finnish President (from 1982 to 1994) Mauno Koivisto, composer Einojuhani Rautavaara and author-artist Tove Jansson.

== Overview ==
The south side of Katajanokka is dominated by a passenger harbour which is frequented by large cruiseferries traveling between Helsinki, Stockholm, Mariehamn, Tallinn and Rostock. The rest of the district comprises co-operative apartment buildings and several small parks. The western part of the residential area, known as the "Old Side" of Katajanokka, is an upscale neighborhood and a well-preserved example of early 20th century Art Nouveau architecture, though up until the mid-19th century – while the centre of Helsinki was being filled with stone buildings – the area was essentially still a wooden shanty town. The eastern part was for a long time a closed military area containing a naval base and shipyard, later a commercial shipyard. It was redeveloped in the 1970s and 1980s into a mainly residential zone, often referred to as the "New Side" of Katajanokka. The new residential area is considered an exceptional example of modern town planning. A major part of the project was the conversion and extension of the old Russian naval barracks to house the Finnish foreign ministry.

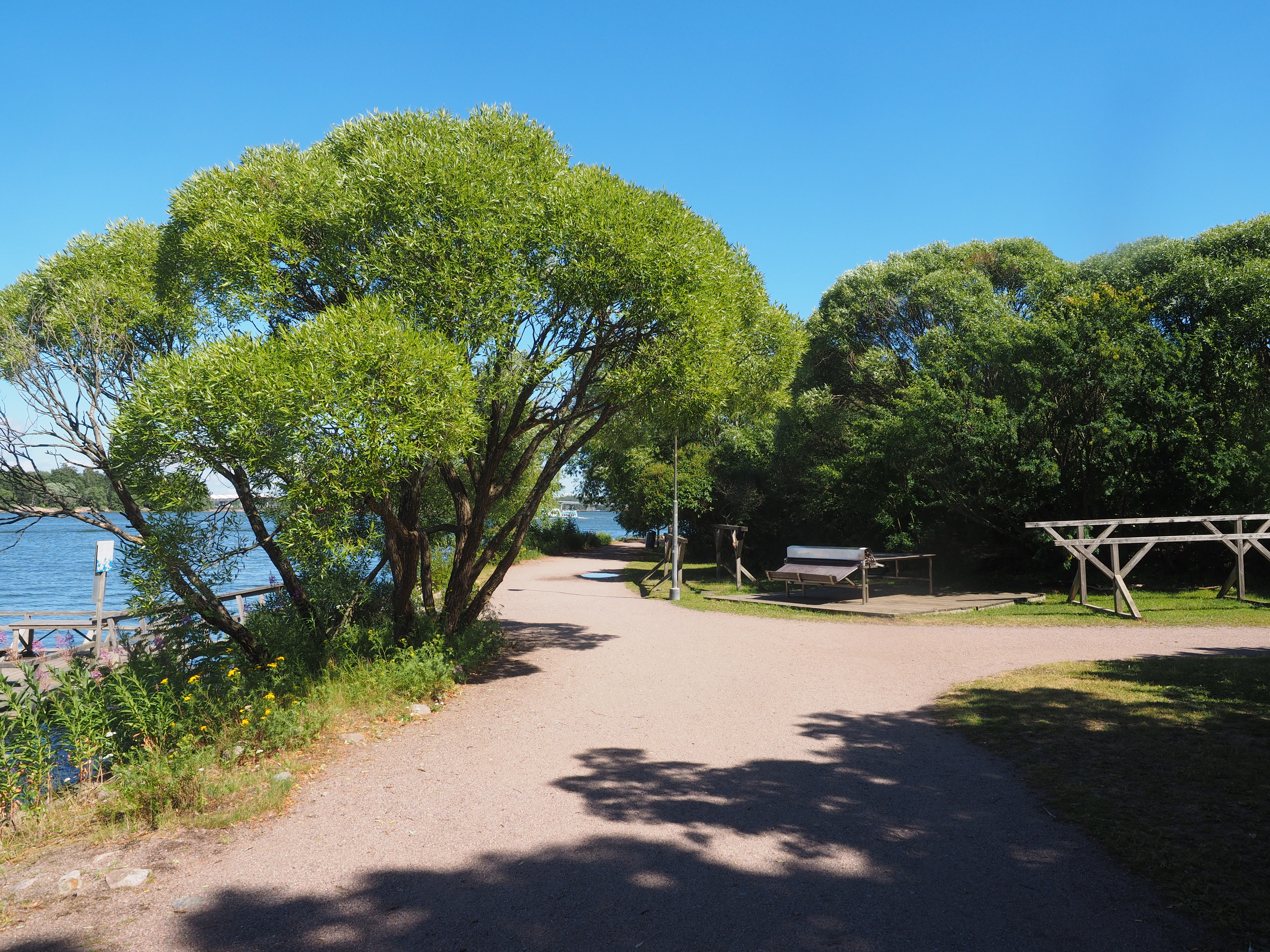
Laivastopuisto ("Navy Park") is a park on the northern shore of Katajanokka.

The northern shore of Katajanokka still serves as a base for the Finnish coast guard, Helsinki maritime police as well as the Finnish icebreaker fleet.

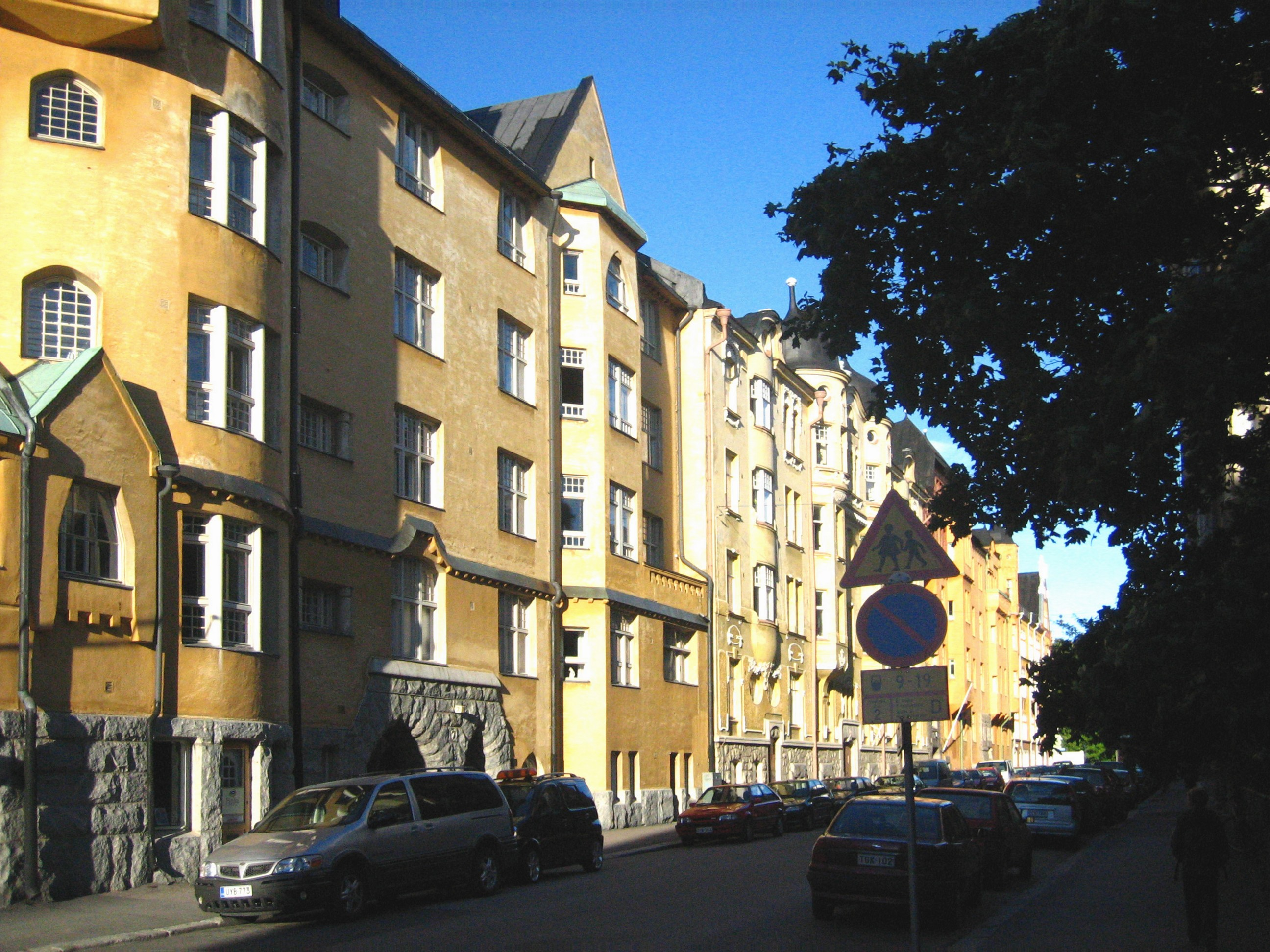
Housing cooperatives built around 1902 in the popular Jugendstil style.

Landmarks of Katajanokka include the Russian Orthodox Cathedral, also known as Uspenski Cathedral (architect Alexey Gornostaev, 1868), the Merikasarmi complex of the Foreign Ministry (architect Carl Ludvig Engel, 1825) and the Finnish headquarters of Stora Enso (architect Alvar Aalto, 1962; the most controversial of Aalto's works).

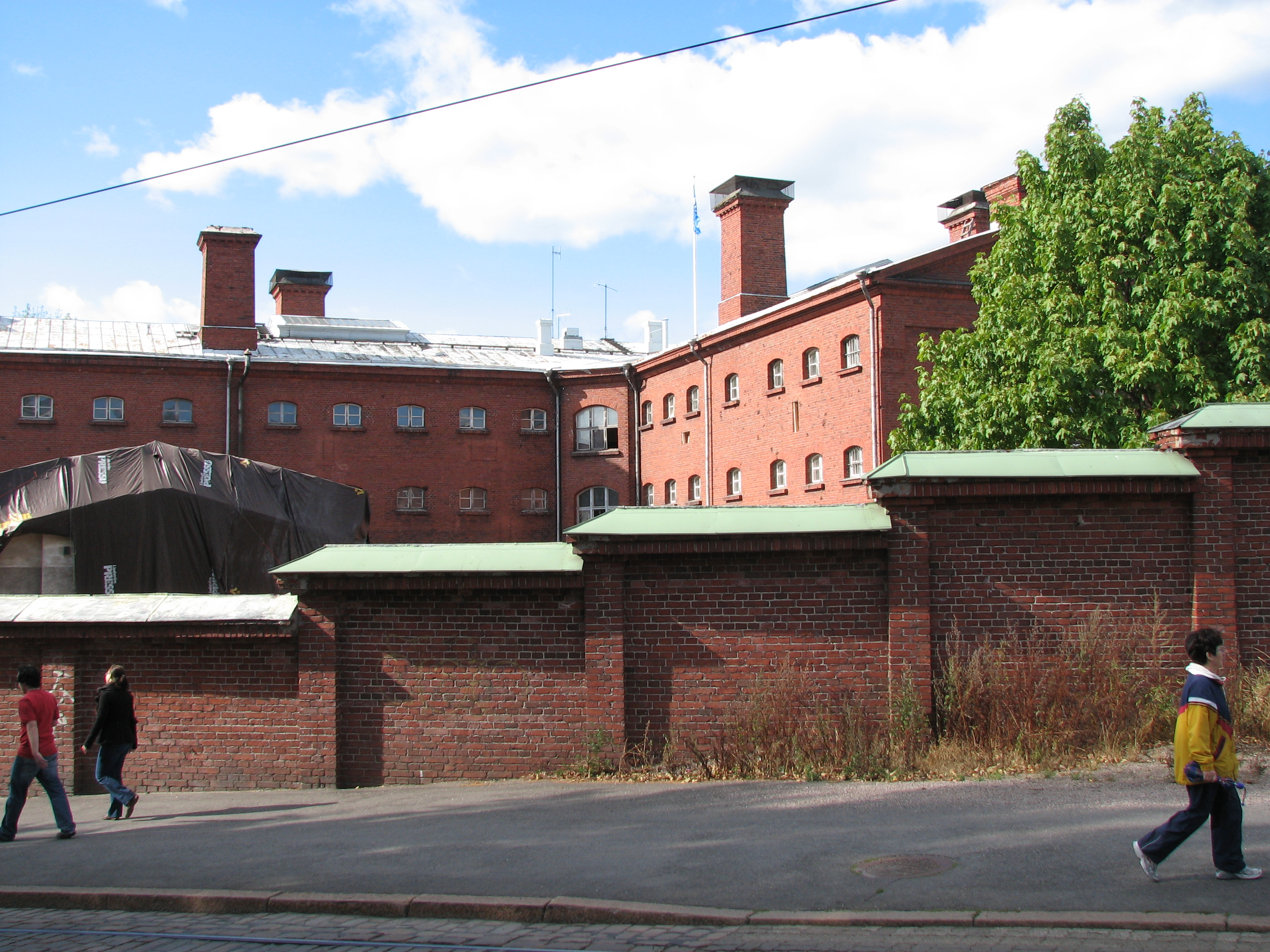
The Katajanokka prison (now a Tribute Portfolio hotel by Marriott).

Another famous building in Katajanokka is the former district prison of Southern Finland. The old prison dates back to 1837, and functioned as a prison until 2002. The prison underwent an extensive interior renovation to convert the cells of the prison into hotel rooms, with sets of two or three cells combined to make up the current hotel rooms. The Best Western Premier Hotel Katajanokka opened in May 2007 with 106 guest rooms. Renovations cost a reported 15 million euro. As a historic building, strict limits were imposed on the redevelopment due to the strict regime of protection for historically significant buildings that is in effect in Finland. Thus, as a hotel, the exterior of the building has been preserved, as has the central corridor of the old prison and even the old prison wall. A restaurant at the lowest level of the hotel has attempted to keep much of the character of the old prison alive. However, an actual former prisoner told a Finnish newspaper that the supposed "prison cutlery" is very different from what the prison actually used: for example, prisoners never drank out of tin cups.

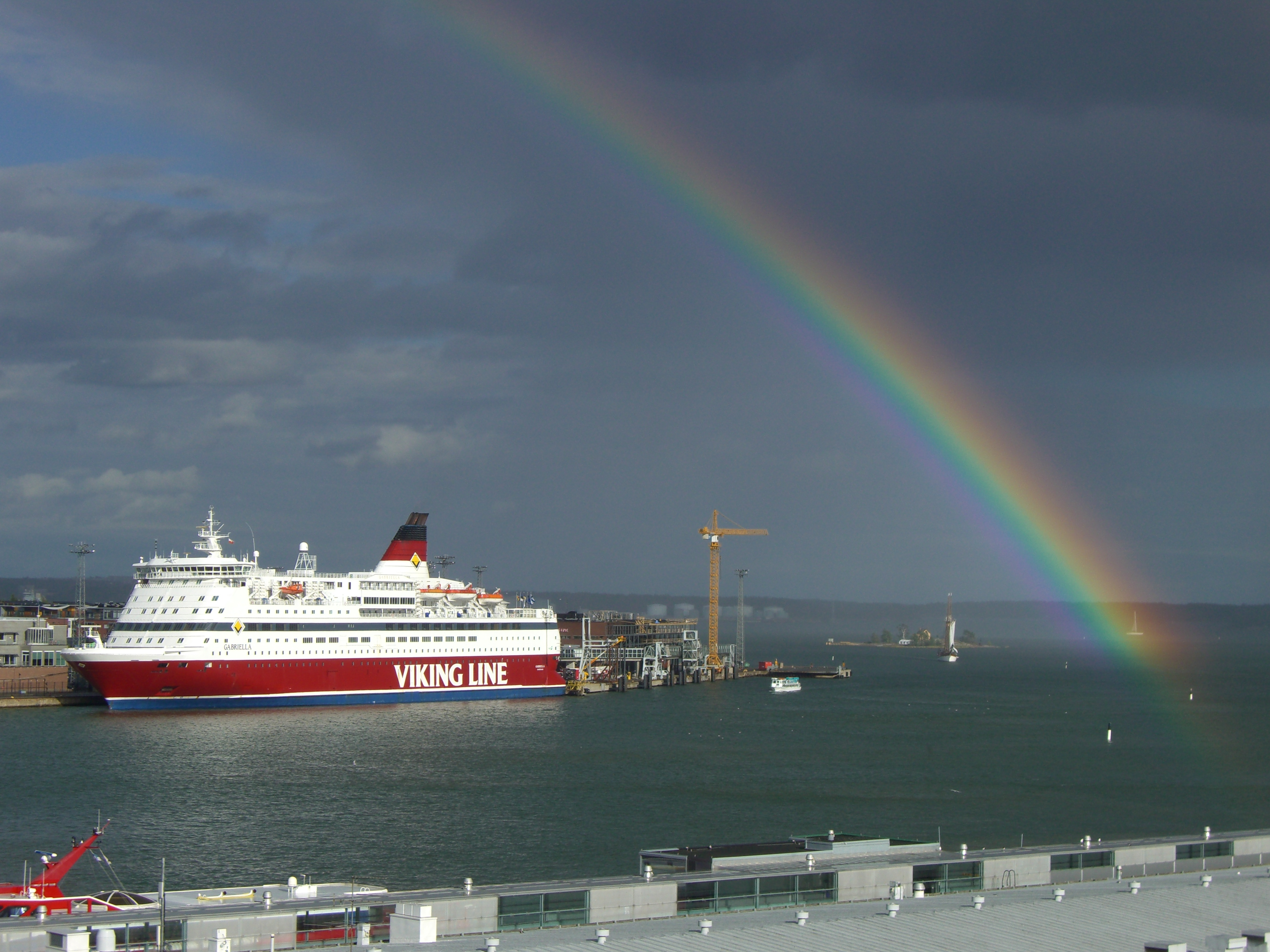
Katajanokka is the harbour of many large cruiseferries; M/S Gabriella from the Viking Line fleet docked to the Katajanokka Terminal.

During the development of Katajanokka in the 1970s and 1980s, many old red brick industrial buildings were spared by converting them for public uses, such as a primary school and an indoors sports arena. There was controversy over the demolition of the former cadet school of the Russian navy, built in the early 20th century. Vacated by the Finnish military in the 1980s, the building survived, with various uses, mainly as a cultural centre. In the late 1990s, the city of Helsinki announced that it was going to demolish the building to build a new apartment building in its place. This caused huge protests, and the demolition was put off for almost a decade, mainly because of opposition from local inhabitants, and the Green League party.

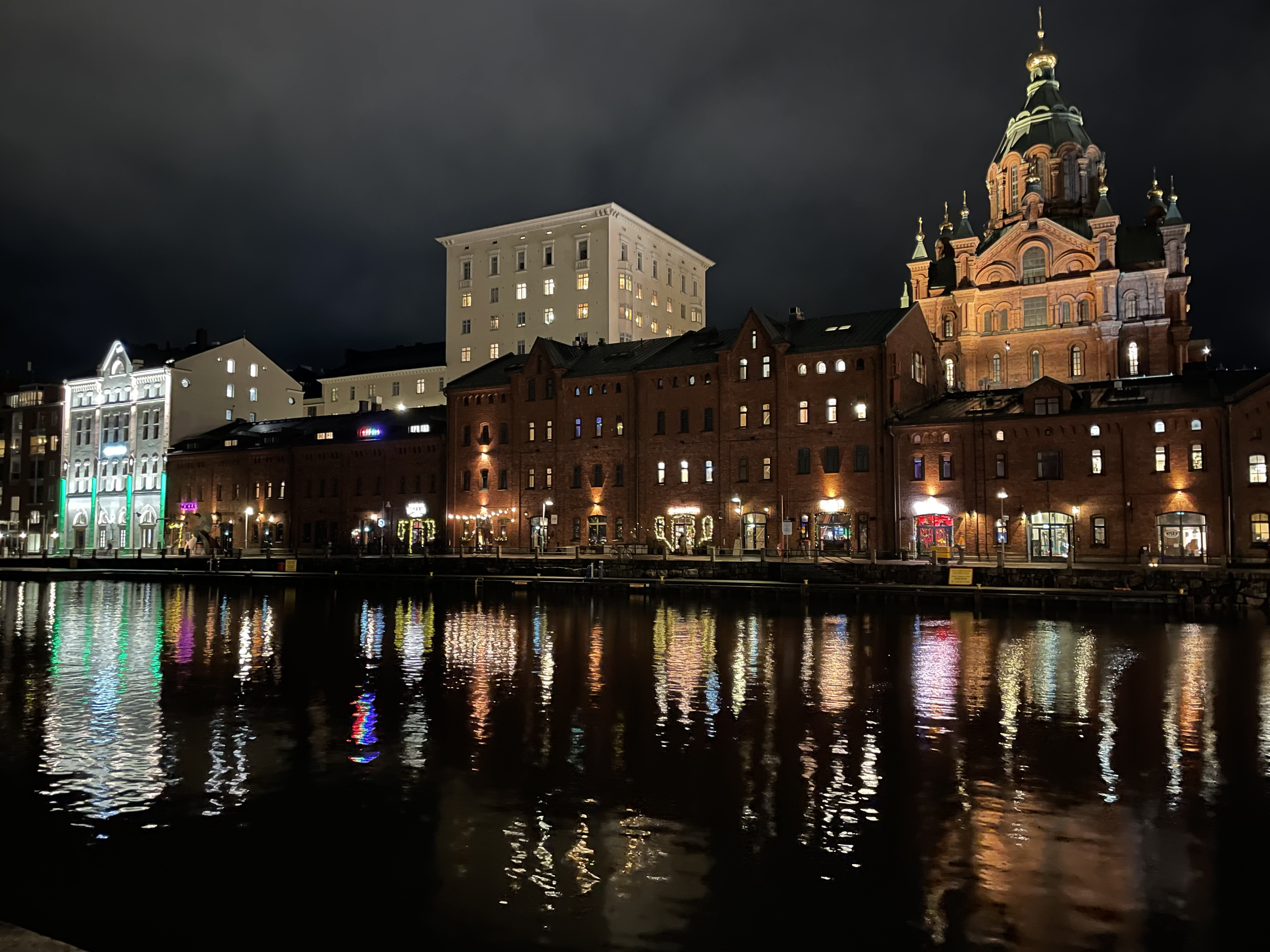
View of the Katajanokka waterfront and Uspenski Cathedral from Pohjoisranta embankment

The navy school building was finally demolished in autumn 2006. However, additional problems resulted: Contrary to what the city of Helsinki and the architecture bureau responsible for the new building had thought, there was no solid rock bottom underneath the old building, but only scattered rocks here and there. Because the original building had stood there since Czarist Russia, no original construction plans were available, and therefore the new plans had to be redone from scratch.

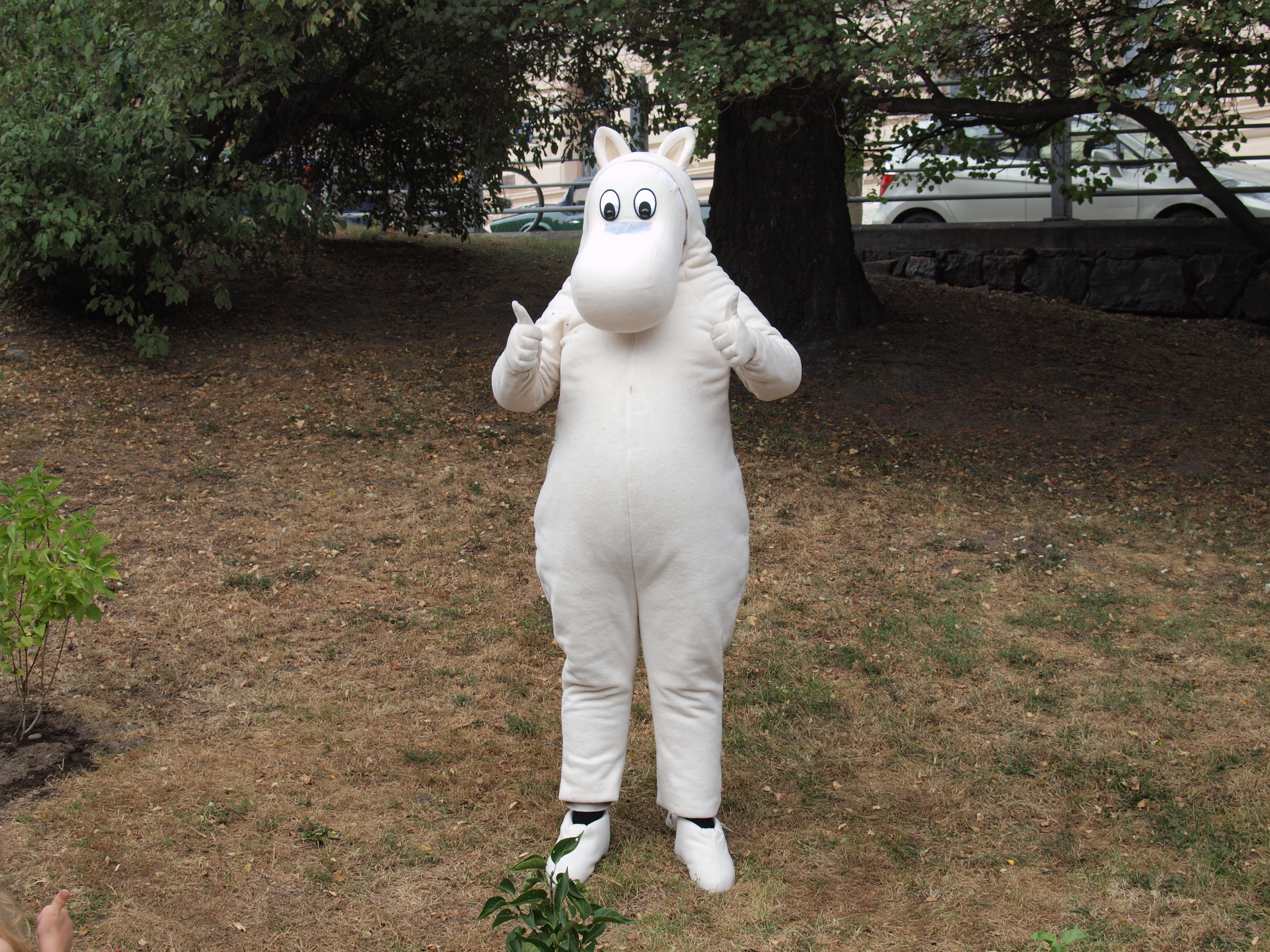
The Katajanokanpuisto park ("Katajanokka park") was renamed as Tove Janssonin puisto ("Tove Jansson's park") on the 100th anniversary of her birth. The ceremony was attended by Moomintroll himself.

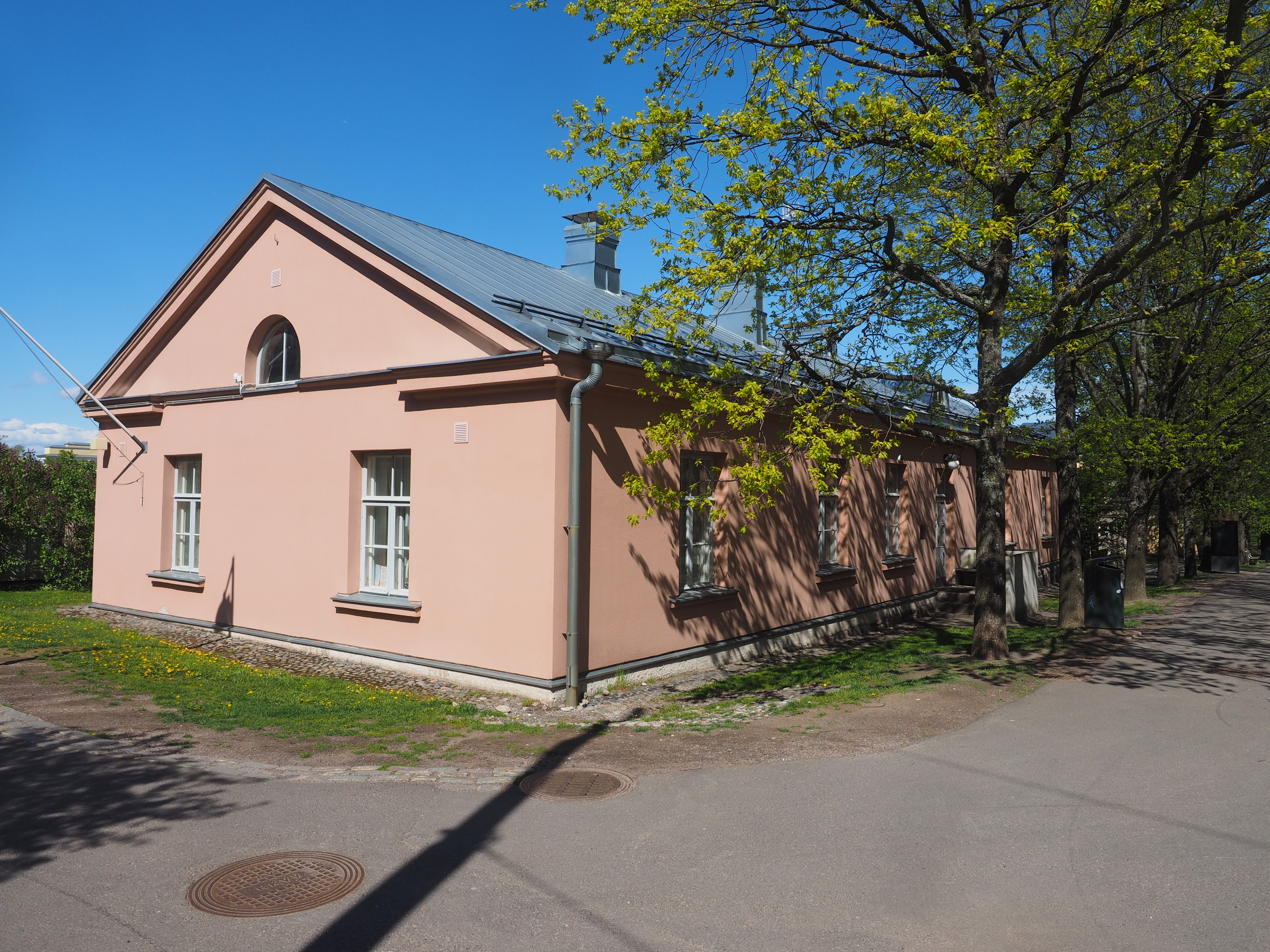
"Possutalo" (Finnish for "the pig house", named after its pink colour) in eastern Katajanokka previously served as a youth activities house but is now a kindergarten.

The local community organisation of Katajanokka is called Katajanokkaseura. The organization publishes an annual regional magazine, Katajanokan kaiku (Finnish for "The Echo of Katajanokka").

=== Katajanokan ympärijuoksu ===
There is an annual running event called the Katajanokan ympärijuoksu (Skattuden runt in Swedish), open for everyone who lives in Katajanokka or has relatives living there. The running event has several categories according to age and sex. Children have separate categories for boys and girls, and are divided into two or three age groups. Adults (which also allows teenagers) have only one category, but results are separate for men and women.

The length of the running varies according to category. Toddlers run once around the inside of a walled-in sporting field. Schoolchildren run around the entire sporting area, younger children once, older children twice. Adults and teenagers run around half of the entire Katajanokka district.

There are no monetary prizes for the event, but winners get medals, and the winner of the adults category gets a trophy. Results are also published in the annual Katajanokan kaiku magazine.

== History ==
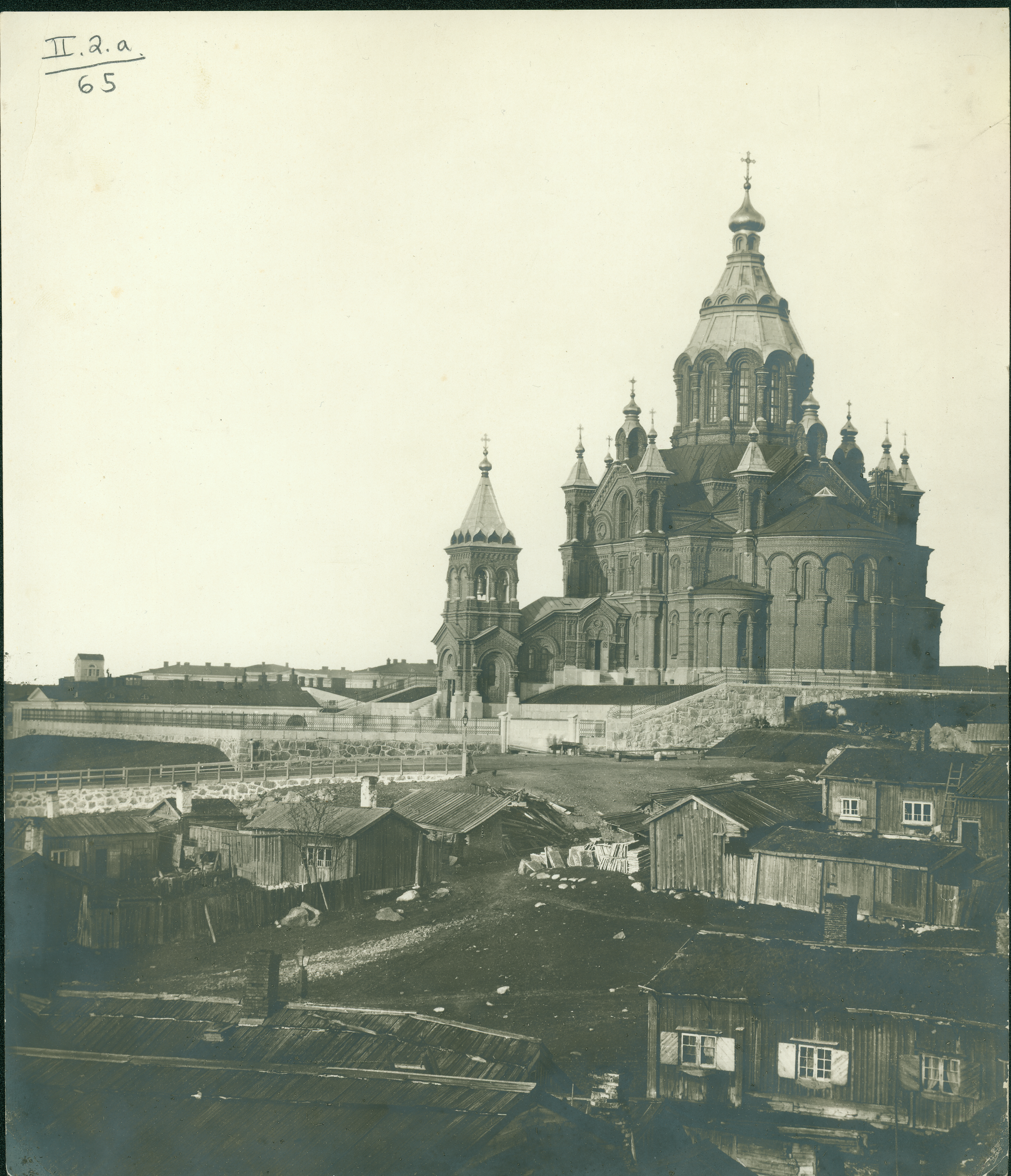
Old wooden houses in Katajanokka in the 1860s. In the background is the Uspenski Cathedral which had just been completed at the time. Photograph by E. Hoffers in 1868.

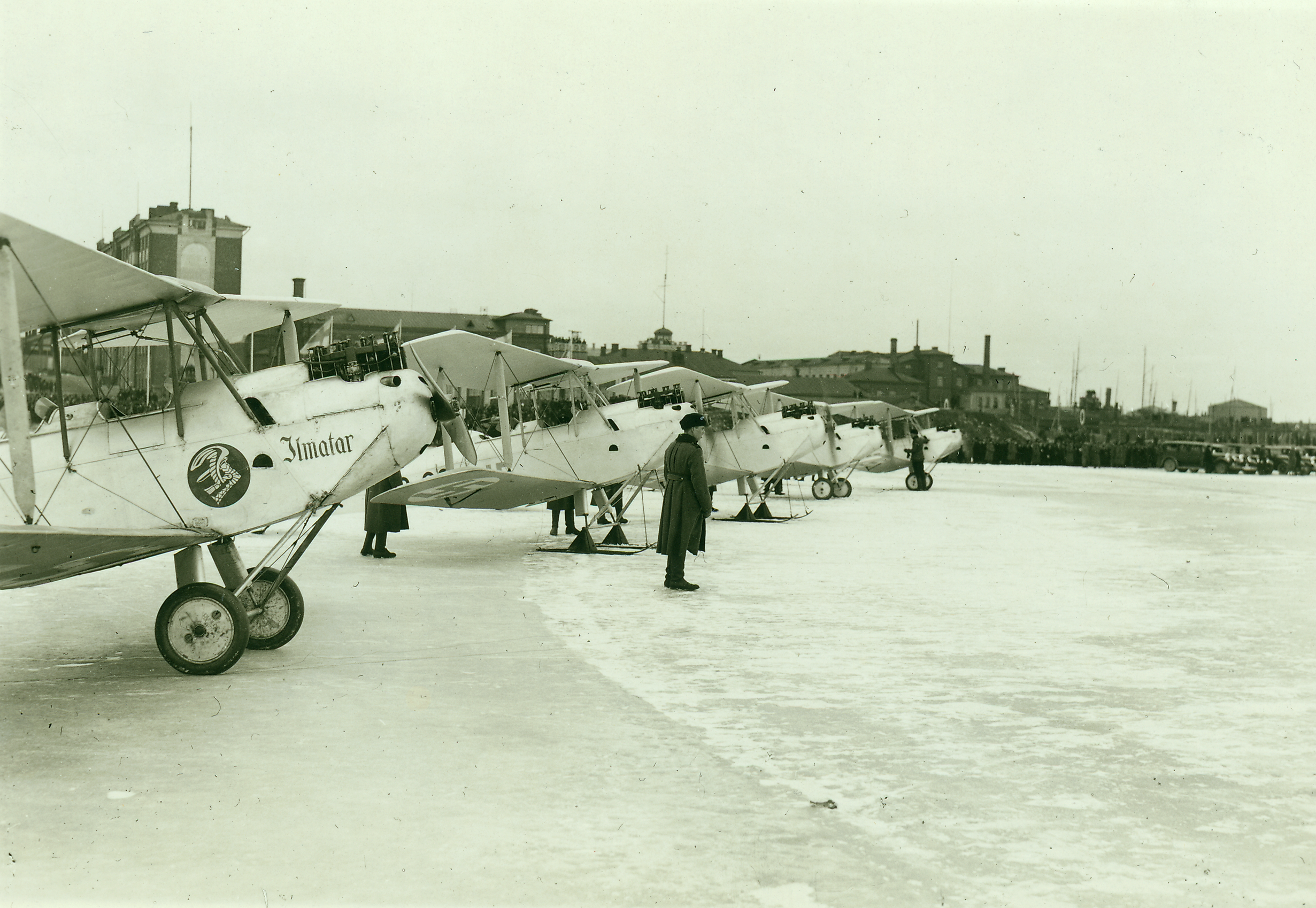
The Katajanokka Airport during the aviation days in winter 1928. On the left-hand side is the edge of the Lutikkalinna building with its radio mast. The broadcast station of the radio battalion formerly located at the building was used to send Finland's first common radio broadcasts in the 1920s.

The area of Katajanokka was originally mostly forest. In the 17th century there was an ironworks on the northern shore of the area, and there was a grain storage magazine on the Laukkasaari island (Swedish: Lökholmen) to the south of the area. The eastern part consisted of pasture grounds for the bourgeoisie.

Urban settlement of Helsinki expanded from what is now the Senate Square to Katajanokka already in the 18th century. In the 1749 zoning plan by Augustin Ehrensvärd Katajanokka was an important part of the defense wall surrounding the city as the peninsula had an important strategic value. This zoning plan was never implemented, and fishing families started moving to Katajanokka.

The outskirts settlements formed on the peninsula remained mostly untouched for decades even after the rest of Helsinki had been completely rebuilt according to the zoning plan made by Johan Albrecht Ehrenström in the early 19th century. The Katajanokka canal separating Katajanokka from the mainland and connecting the South and North Harbours of Helsinki with each other, already proposed in Ehrenström's plan, was ultimately only built in 1844.

=== Name ===
The name "Katajanokka" literally means "Juniper Point" but the connection with junipers is just a coincidence resulting from a mistranslation.

The neighbourhood was originally known in the 17th century by the Swedish name Estnäs Skatan ("Estnäs Point"). The Finnish-speaking population did not understand Swedish, so the word skata ("point") became kataja ("juniper").

The Swedish name Skat Udden can be found from a 1775 map, while the Finnish name Katajanokka was first mentioned in the Suometar newspaper in 1856.

=== Barracks ===
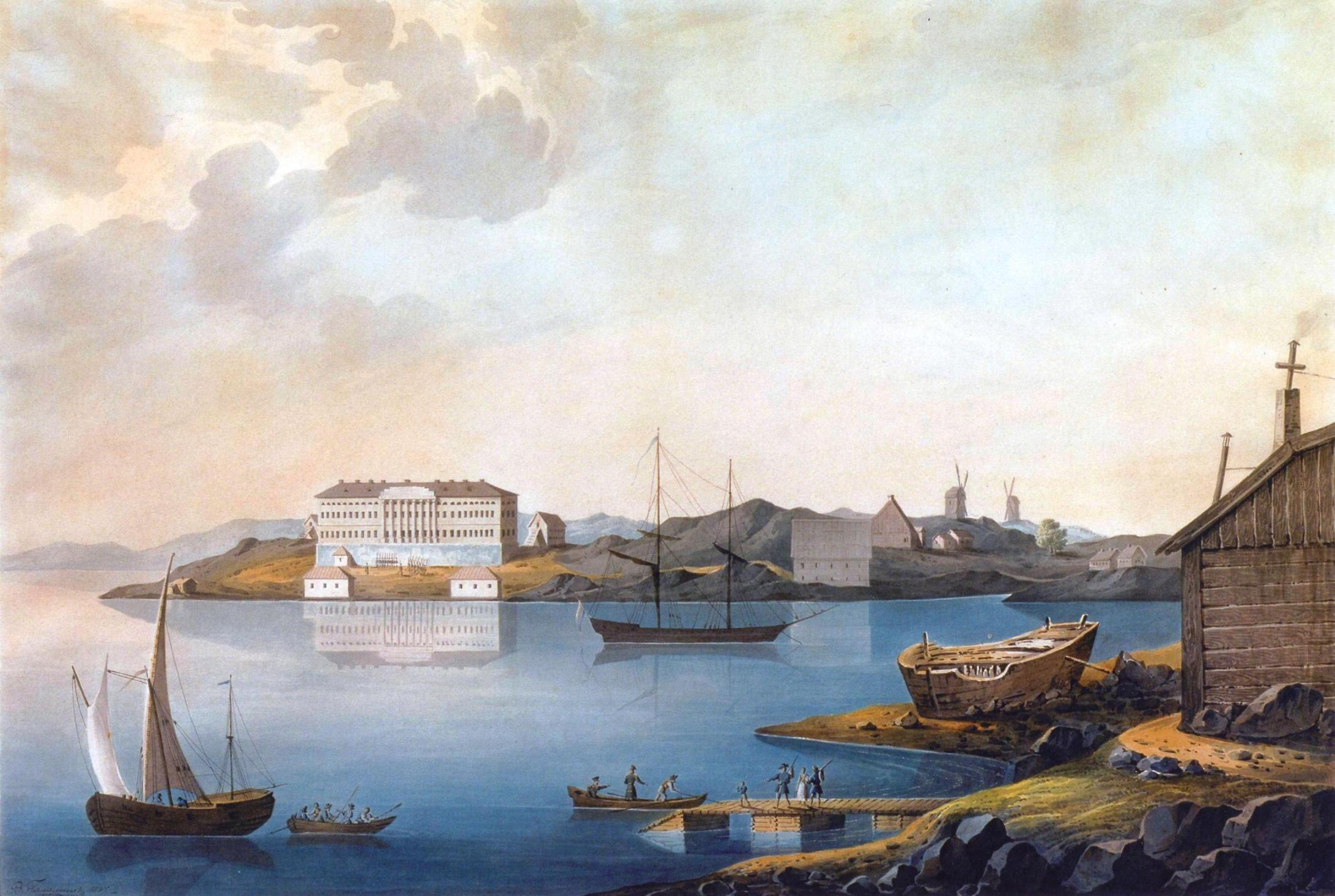
The recently completed Merikasarmi building seen from the northern harbour in 1827.

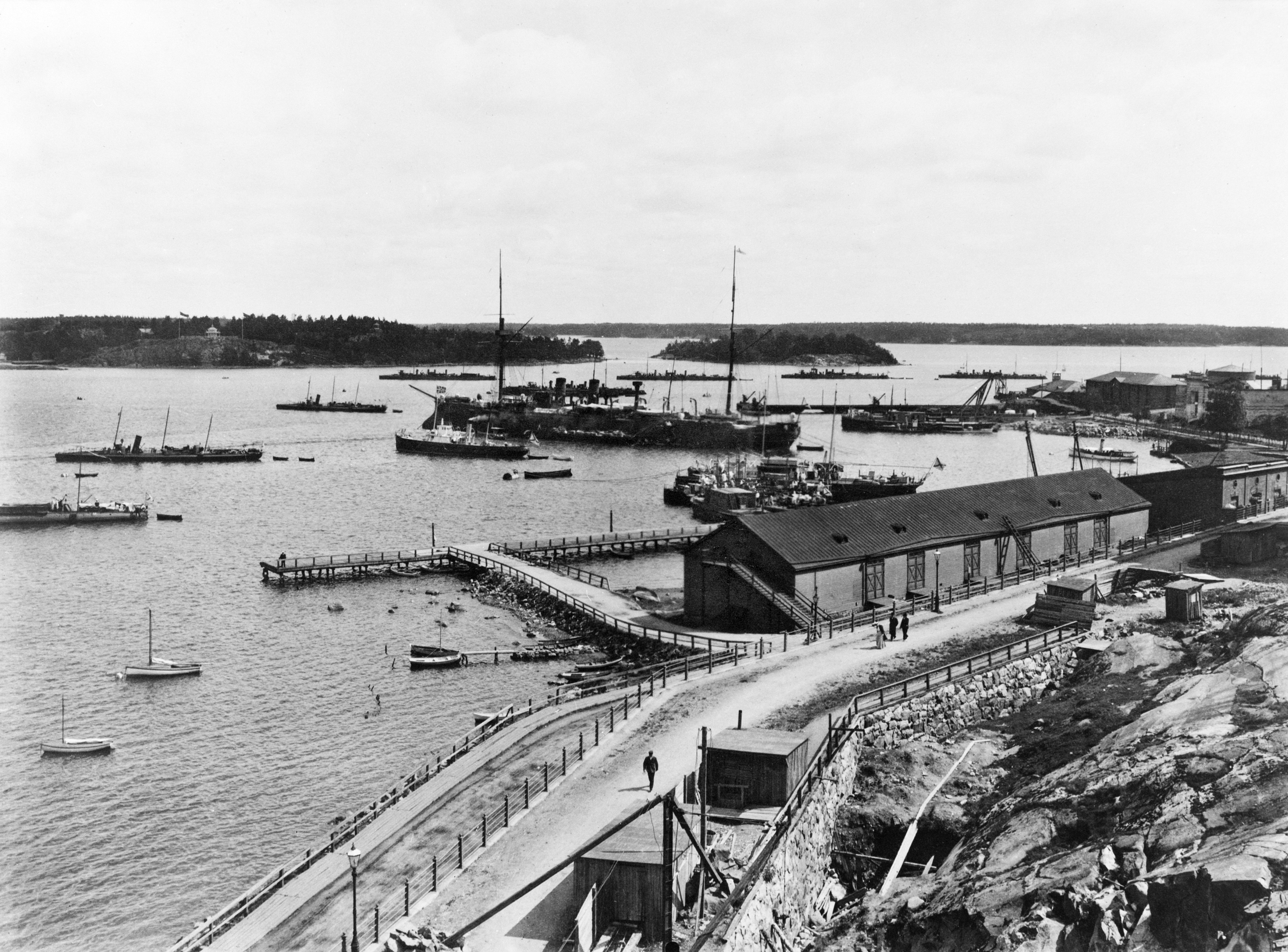
The military harbour of the Baltic Fleet on the northern shore of Katajanokka in 1907.

From the 1810s to the 1830s barracks buildings designed by Carl Ludvig Engel and Anders Fredrik Granstedt for the use of the Russian military were built on the eastern tip of Katajanokka. In 1831 the barracks were taken into use by the First marine crew of Finland, which also caused the name of the barracks to be established as Merikasarmi ("Marine barracks") instead of the Katajanokka barracks. This branch of the military was disestablished in the 1880s when the Grand Duchy of Finland introduced conscription. After this, the area became the base of the Russian Baltic fleet.

After Finland became independent the garrison moved to the Finnish Defence Forces. It hosted the Helsinki navy station and military station (until 1958), the broadcast station of the radio battalion (in the 1920s) and the Valmet docks until the middle 1970s. The command of the Finnish Navy was located in a red brick building built in the 1880s until 1983 and the Guard Jaeger Regiment used the barracks in the 1960s. The deteriorated barracks buildings were renovated and restored for the use of the Ministry for Foreign Affairs from 1984 to 1989. New side buildings on either side of the old artillery courtyard were also built at the same time. A gate dating to 1776 was left as part of one of the side buildings. It is part of the artillery magazine built at the same time as the Suomenlinna fortress. Also a copy of the western officers' barracks was built on the eastern side of the barracks according to Engel's original plan.

=== Zoning plan ===
Up to the 19th century, most of the buildings on the western side of Katajanokka were old wooden buildings built in the 18th century, already badly deteriorated, and warehouses. Exceptions to this included the Uspenski Cathedral built in 1868, the building of the Mint of Finland (1836), the Helsinki County Prison located near the garrison and some apartment buildings built in the very end of the century. Katajanokka had been left outside the city's zoning plan. During the 19th century there were several attempts to redesign the area as a residential neighbourhood. Katajanokka finally became a subject of central interest in the 1870s. The zoning plan in the area was confirmed in 1895. According to it, the southern shore of the peninsula was reserved for a harbour and the area north to it as a residential area. The tip of the peninsula remained in the use of the garrison.

A sudden growth in ship traffic to Helsinki was in dire need of more space, and Katajanokka was an ideal location for a new cargo harbour: it was easily accessible from the open sea and the water on its southwestern corner was deep enough. The city engineer J. Condrad D. Reuter fixed and amended the zoning plan made by Ernst Lohmann, and the city expropriated the small wooden houses in the area. The old rental contracts of the lots were no longer renewed.

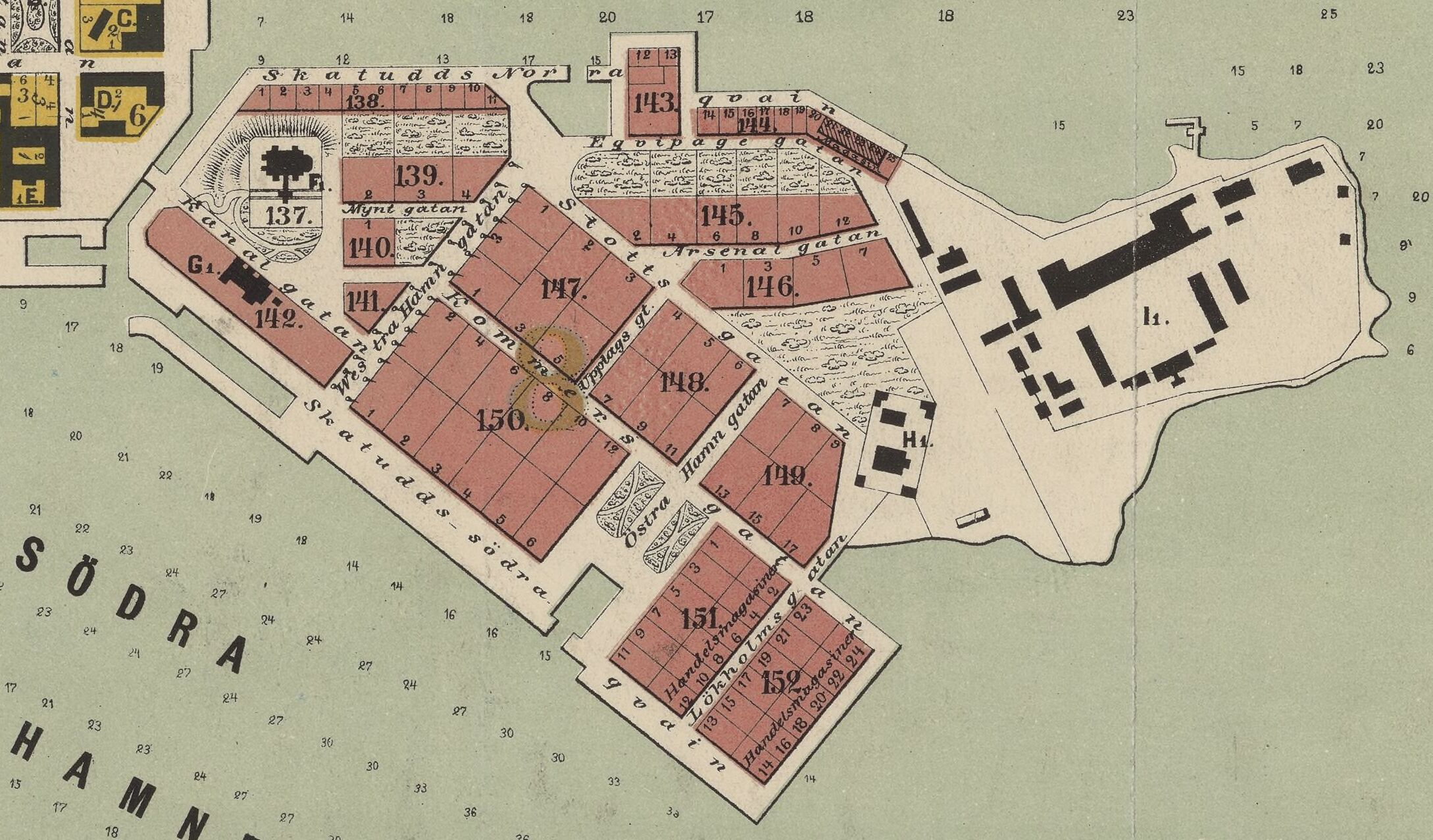
Katajanokka in a zoning plan from 1876. The plan included harbour pools and many urban green spaces, and the need for a harbour rail had not yet been taken into account. Soon this plan was replaced with a more efficient one, and development of a large cargo harbour in Katajanokka started.

In 1879 Theodor Tallqvist was given the task of making a new zoning plan with the aim to fit the southern part of Katajanokka better to the needs of seafaring and commerce. Tallqvist criticised the previous zoning plan heavily because it aimed to implement other recreation activities as well as the harbour activity; Tallqvist thought that the city needed to put commerce and industry above all other needs. Tallqvist used the harbours of Gothenburg, Copenhagen and Hamburg as inspiration. Tallqvist's plan was completed in 1882 but its implementation had to wait for the Helsinki harbour rail to be built. According to the plan, the coastal area to the south of the Kruunuvuorenkatu street was reserved for the harbour and the area to the north of it was reserved for residential use. The tip of the peninsula remained in use for the garrison. The plan did not include much in the way of aesthetics, and it included hardly any parks or lawns. Planning residential blocks in connection to the harbour was unusual. The reason for this has been seen to have been that the middle part of Katajanokka was too hilly for the use of the harbour, while the harbour could be extended to the sea by filling in more land.

In 1894, in connection to the construction of the pier, Katajanokka was connected to Laukkasaari with filled-in land. In the same year, the engineer Herman Norrmén used Tallqvist's suggestion for his final zoning plan, which was confirmed in February 1895. Norrmén added more filled-in land to Tallqvist's plan and removed the railway turntables and the extension of the harbour rail to Pohjoisranta, from where Tallqvist had intended it to go to the Helsinki Central railway station passing to the north of the Kaisaniemi botanical gardens. The architect Lars Sonck criticised the Katajanokka zoning plan saying it would make the area into a "jumble" where potential recreation areas would be surrounded by piers, magazines and military buildings.

=== Other building history ===
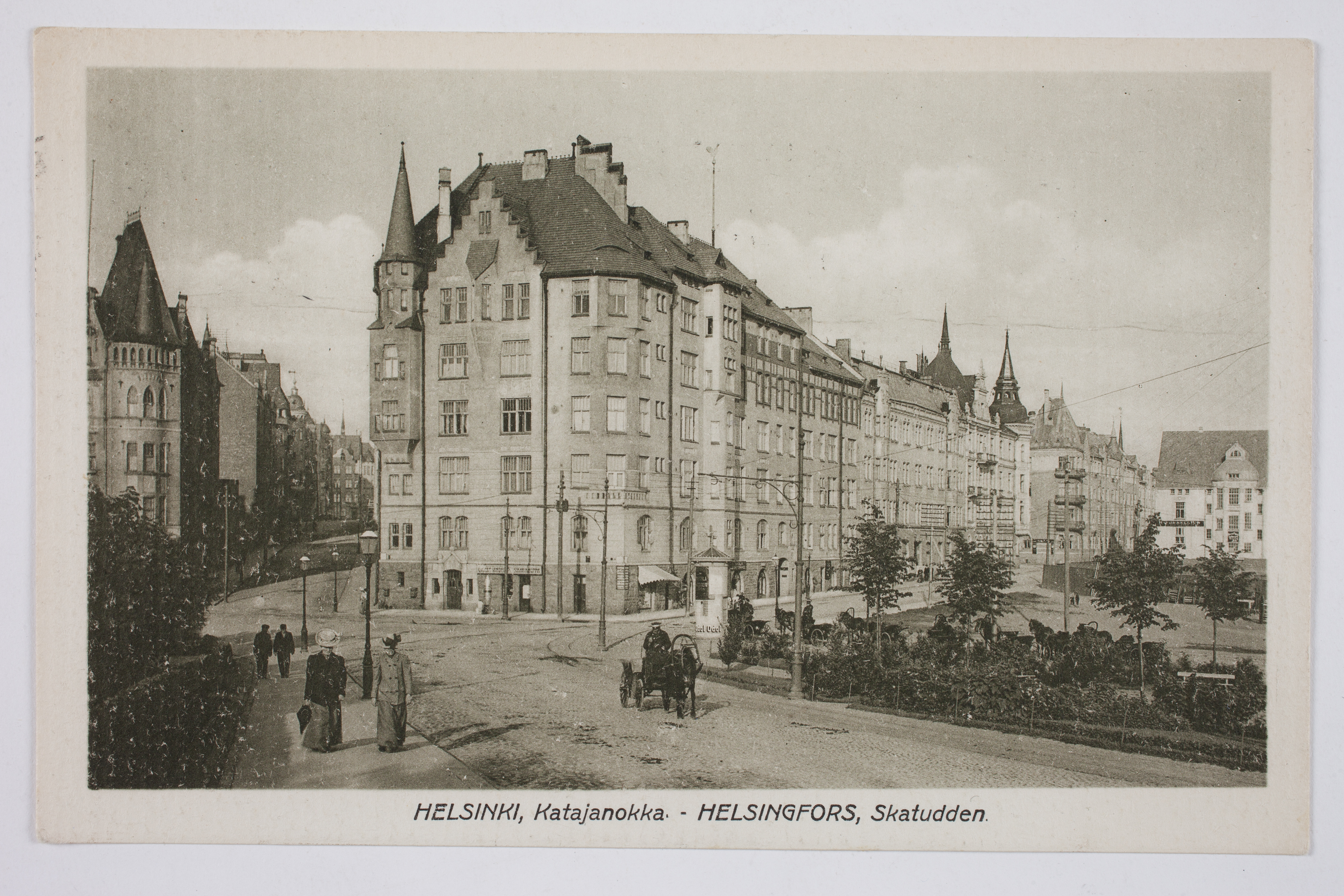
A postcard showing the corner between Luotsikatu, Satamakatu and Kruunuvuorenkatu around 1900.

A number of brick warehouses were built in the harbour area. The neighbouring residential area, the "old side" of Katajanokka, was mostly built during one decade in the early 20th century. The buildings in the area form a rare harmonious Art Nouveau architectural entity. For example the architects Gesellius, Lindgren, Saarinen designed three of the houses: the first to be completed was the Tallberg house, whose design was the trio's first competition victory. Katajanokka started becoming a residential area for the wealthy population, especially merchants and government officials.

It was a reaction of individualism and nationalism, of romance and young forces against the academic formality of the end of the century, which achieved such an intense manifestation in the architecture of this area. Towers, horns, overhangs, balconies, steep roofs, unique details and a strong sense of vitality were born - which often means the same as unrest, everything in contrast to the renaissance-based buildings of the previous era.

— a description of the architecture in Katajanokka written by Nils Wasastjerna in the 1940s

Many corporate head offices were located near the harbour, such as the head office of the Kesko group (1939) and an office of Paulig. Warehouses were built for the Cooperative Wholesales Store and for the Central Finnish Cooperative Society. The Paulig coffee roastery advanced the food industry in the area. It was founded in 1904 and stayed in business until the late 1960s.

In the 1930s there was a suggestion to build a bridge from Katajanokka to Korkeasaari. There was also a suggestion to fill in the Katajanokka canal.

Rebuilding of a couple of houses destroyed in World War II or unbuilt lots has been done in accordance with the historical surroundings.

On the western side of Katajanokka is the Stora Enso headquarters designed by the academic Alvar Aalto (1962), a building clad in white marble, inspired by Italian renaissance palaces. It is visible as an ending to the Pohjoisesplanadi street from the Market Square, although a distinctive feature of the building is that it sort of lacks a frontal facade. The decorative red brick Norrmén house built in 1897 had been demolished to make room for Aalto's building. There has been intense debate for several decades about whether Aalto's building fits in with the Market Square milieu and the cityscape dominated by the Uspenski Cathedral. When a white office building for the use of the development assistance department of the Ministry of Foreign Affairs was built near Aalto's building in 1993, the buildings have been seen as supporting each other and forming their own clear-bordered architectural entity.

In 1913 the so-called Chapel of Peace was built at the lot of the Uspenski Cathedral to commemorate the 100th anniversary of the Treaty of Fredrikshamn. It was seen as a symbol of Russian oppression and in 1919 nationalistic students covered it with tar. It was impossible to get the tar off the rock surface, so the building was dismantled. In the 1960s an air raid shelter was built underneath the Uspenski Cathedral.

==== The eastern tip of Katajanokka ====
The buildings on the eastern tip surrounding the Merikasarmi building, in the so-called "new side", consisted already in the 1920s of various buildings related to warehouse, workshop and dock activities. The Katajanokka Airport used by Aero Oy (now known as Finnair) was also located on the southern shore of the area, serving as an airport for route flights from 1924 to 1936. When the navy garrison and the military harbour had moved to Upinniemi and the Valmet dock had moved to Vuosaari, most of the old warehouse and industrial buildings were dismantled. The zoning plan designed by the architectural trio Vilhelm Helander, Pekka Pakkala and Mikael Sundman was confirmed in 1977 and from 1977 to 1986 a total of 21 new apartment buildings were built in the area. The last of the free lots were built from 2006 to 2009. The zoning plan sought to return to the tightly-built urban space in a contrast to the earlier suburban type of construction, which has later been seen as a turning point in Finnish city design. The plan was also praised for taking the architectural and cultural history of the surrounding area into account. Open spaces were sought to be measured in regard of the actual number of visitors. However, because of design norms, the building efficiency remained lower than that of the old part. The red brick facades were ordered to be laid in place, even though this was during the golden age of element construction. A large number of the houses were designed as rental or Hitas houses, which caused a restriction on the cost of construction. For example parking had to be done on ground level. In the latest buildings completed in 2007 parking is handled underground.

=== Harbour ===
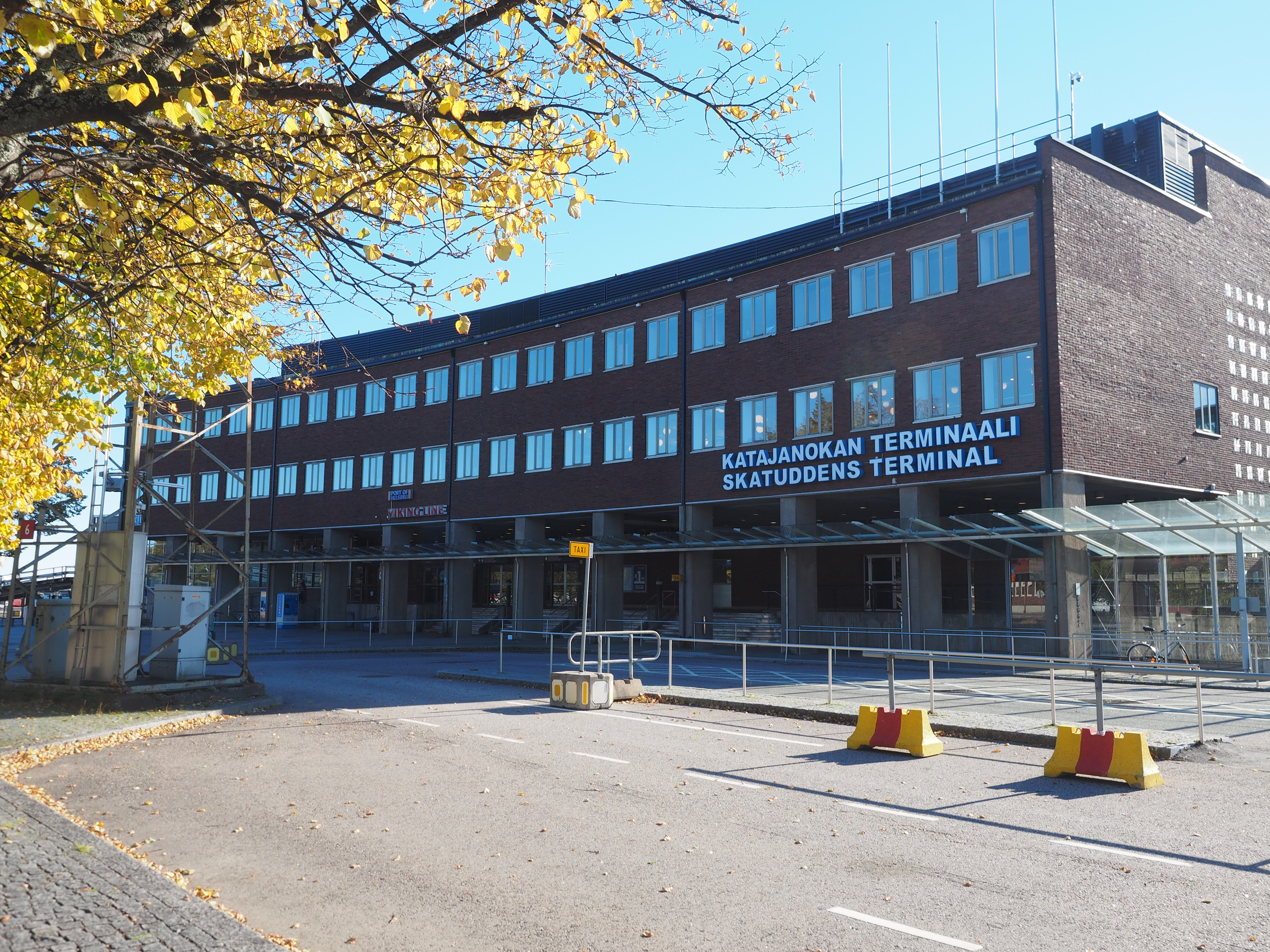
The Katajanokka Terminal.

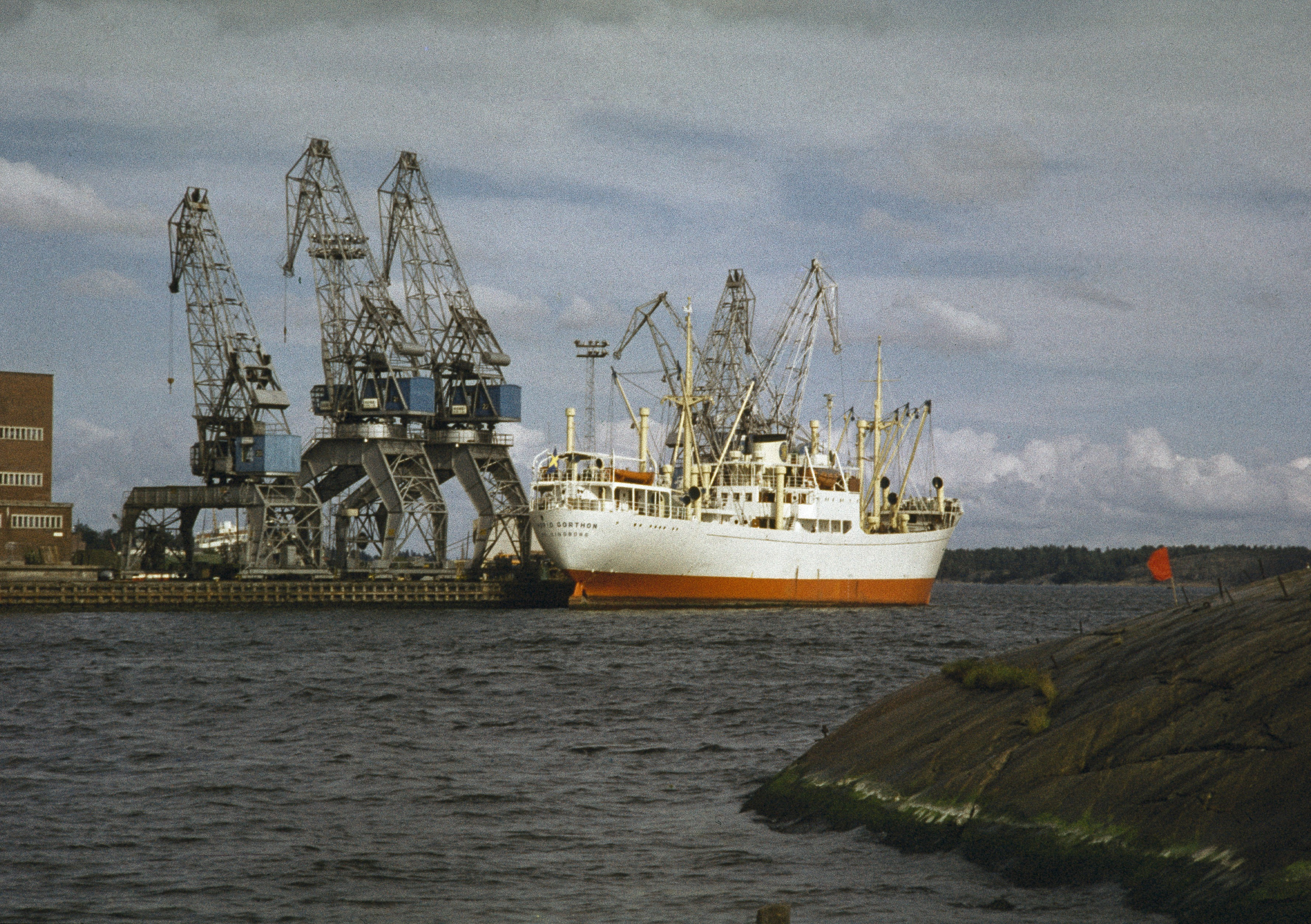
The Katajanokanlaituri pier in 1967.

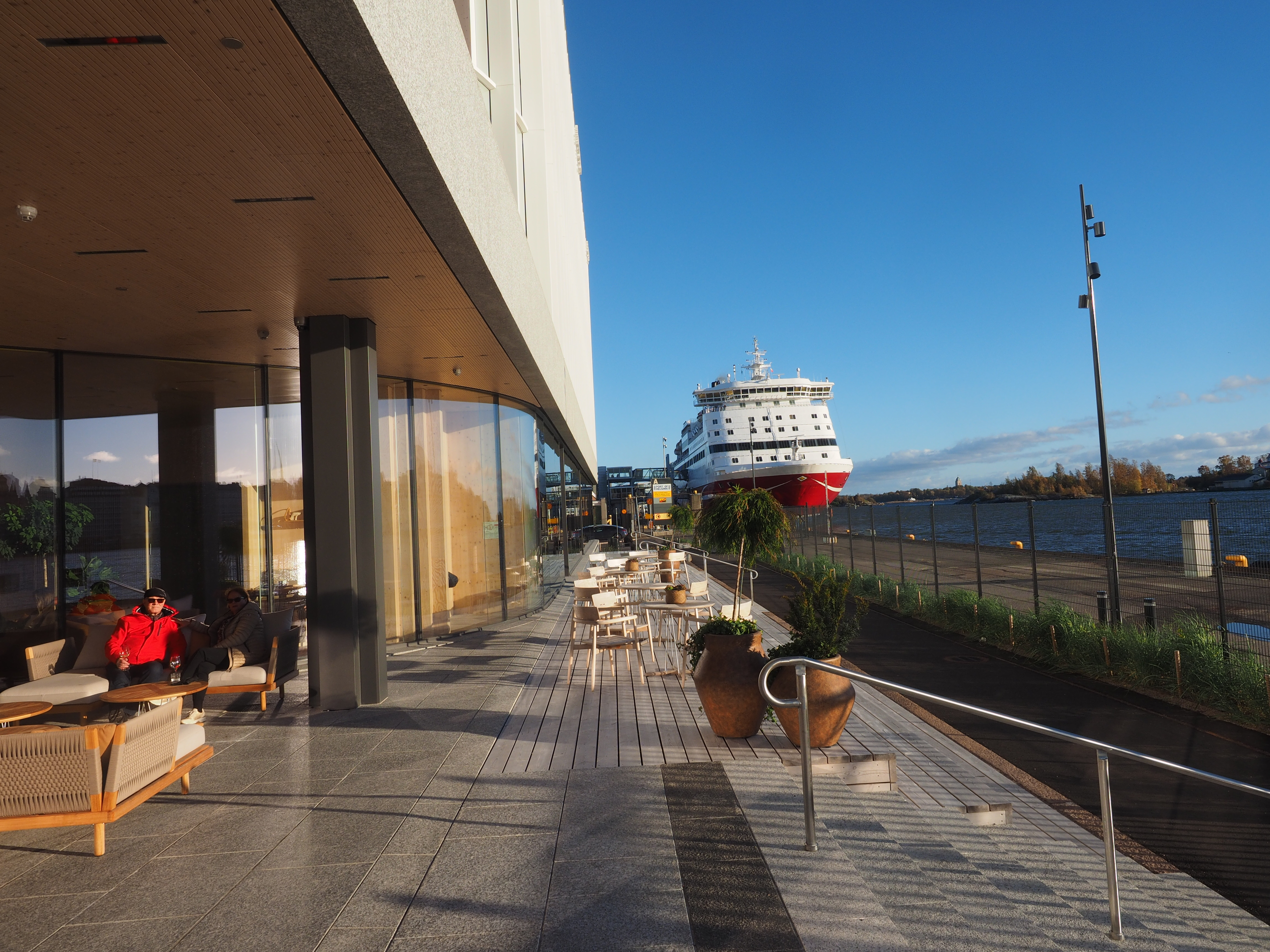
A view of the outdoor terrace of Sokos Hotel Pier 4 on the pier of the former cargo traffic harbour. In the background is a Viking Line ship.

In the late 19th century, the southern shore of Katajanokka was built into a cargo traffic harbour, which was part of the South Harbour. The Katajanokka harbour became the most modern harbour in Finland. The Helsinki harbour rail, leading from the VR warehouses south of the Töölönlahti bay along the city's coastline to the Katajanokka harbour, was built near the Old Market Hall in 1894. The rail reached Katajanokka in the next year. A large railway yard was built in the harbour with tracks going between the warehouses. One track reached all the way to the eastern tip. New tracks were still being built from 1966 to 1967. The harbour was later changed into a passenger traffic harbour.

The last of the fourteen tripodal cranes on Katajanokka were built in 1959. After this, the Katajanokka harbour could at some times use two cranes for each hatch on a cargo ship. One of the cranes was unloading cargo from the SS Niobe when a chain of cargo carriages crashed into one of the crane's legs at a spot where the crane tracks and the railway tracks crossed. The crane fell down and was completely destroyed, but its driver suffered no injuries. The last four harbour cranes in Katajanokka were dismantled in January 1986.

The harbour activity also had side effects. From the 19th century to the middle 20th century Katajanokka was an area of ill repute, where illegal sales of liquor and prostitution were often practised. For a long time, the image of the northern shore of Katajanokka was dominated by large warehouses belonging to a freight forwarder. These have later been renovated into the use of restaurants and cafés. The northern shore used to also host a garbage pier, where excrement was loaded into barges which took it to the countryside to act as fertiliser for the country fields. However, sometimes garbage transporters dumped their cargo right into the sea.

The cargo harbour had become unprofitable, and the central location of Katajanokka made it a poor choice for cargo traffic. Rail transport to the South Harbour and Katajanokka ended on 30 April 1980. The last four harbour cranes were dismantled in January 1986. Traffic on the cargo harbour rail decreased as the South Harbour became mostly a harbour for car ferries. Car ferry traffic started on 9 July 1974 by the ship MS Viking 5 to Stockholm, Sweden. The site of the old harbour rail yard now hosts a wide avenue called Katajanokanlaituri, and many old warehouse buildings along it have been renovated into hotels and conference centres.

Guarding the harbour area in Katajanokka was improved on 3 May 1994 to improve passport control and customs activity. All persons present at the harbour area had to have an identity document with a photograph with them. In early May 1997 the gate control of the entire South Harbour was transferred over to a security company.

=== Shipyard ===
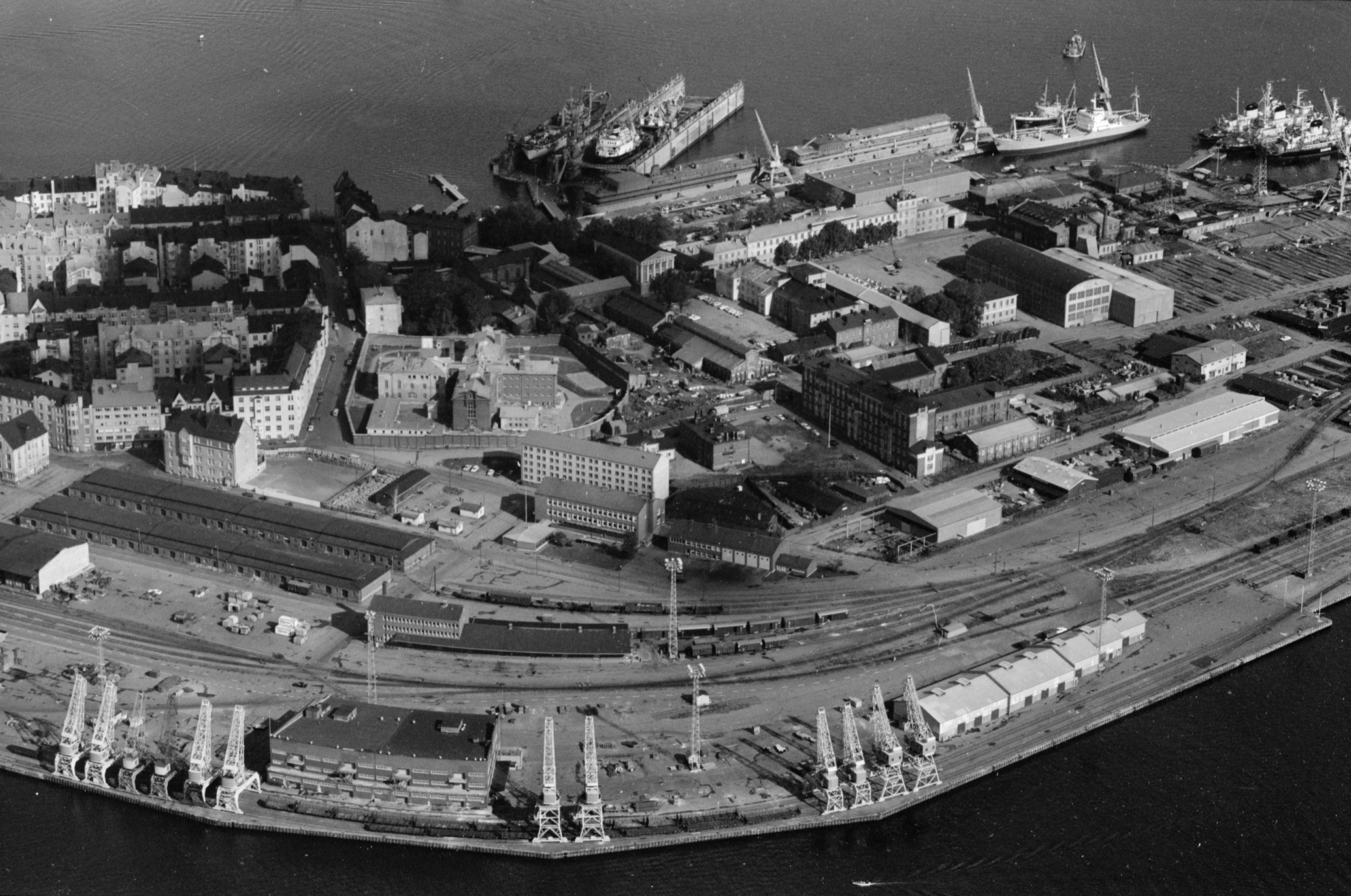
Katajanokka in 1970. The Katajanokka shipyard is at the background and in the front between the harbour cranes is the Katajanokka Terminal, which served as a customs warehouse until 1977.

From 1945 to 1970 the Valmet shipyard on the eastern part of Katajanokka built about 160 ships, of which some were sent as war reparations to the Soviet Union. The shipyard employed about a thousand people and caused significant traffic past the residential blocks. The crampedness of Katajanokka placed limits on how the activity could be improved and production volume be increased. In the end Valmet had to find a new place for the shipyard. A new shipyard was opened in Vuosaari in 1974 and the Katajanokka shipyard was discontinued in 1977. The last ship launched from the shipyard was the tanker MT Tebostar on 26 April 1974. There was a scrapyard for ships for some time at the site.

=== Icebreakers ===
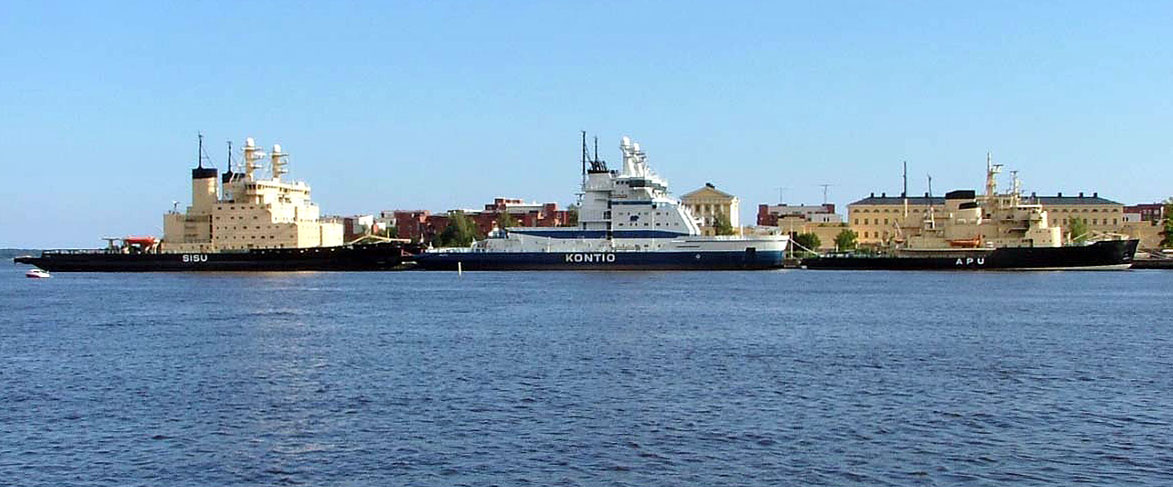
Finnish icebreakers at Katajanokka in summer 2004: Sisu, Urho, Kontio, Otso, Apu and Voima. (Apu was sold to Russia as a river icebreaker in 2006.)

The Finnish icebreakers, with the exception of the multiple-use icebreakers, still spend their summers at the Katajanokka shore. Multiple-use icebreakers need to use the harbour only for installing and storage of equipment. This service is offered by the Kotka harbour. After the Valmet dock activity in Katajanokka had gradually moved to Vuosaari the old equipment pier was leased for the use of the icebreakers on 24 March 1975. Individual icebreakers had been spending their summers at the shores of Katajanokka also before this. For example in summer 1971 an old system was kept in force, where two icebreakers were at Jätkäsaari, three at Hietalahti and three near the Valmet dock in Katajanokka. The icebreakers were connected to the city's district heating network on 10 December 1979. Until this they had been generating their own heat and hot water themselves. The current icebreakers are Kontio, Otso, Voima, Urho, Sisu and Polaris. In summertime, the icebreakers spending their summer at Katajanokka can also be rented for private events.

=== Plans ===
There was a plan to build a house for architecture and design (Armi) in Katajanokka, with an architecture design competition held in 2001. The building would have been located next to the Stora Enso main office, in place of the Kanavaterminaali building. No funding could be found for the project and the organisations behind it parted ways, so the project was finally abandoned in 2006. In 2007 there was a plan for a hotel at the same site, named after Alvar Aalto and riding on his reputation, with the Swiss architecture bureau Herzog & de Meuron invited to design it.

In 2006 there was a plan to build a bridge from Katajanokka to Laajasalo. The bridge would have been taken into use for trams and pedestrian traffic. In later versions the bridge was replaced with a tunnel, and a line going via Tervasaari and Sompasaari was found as an alternative route. Later, the Crown Bridges project was designed to pass through Hakaniemi.

There was a plan to build premises for the Helsinki emergency dispatch centre in Katajanokka. However, the rent of the premises was seen as too high, and the emergency dispatch centre was moved to Kerava. A new user for the caves was found, but its identity has not been made public. Explosions during the excavation of the caves caused damage in the properties along Luotsikatu.

== Architecture ==
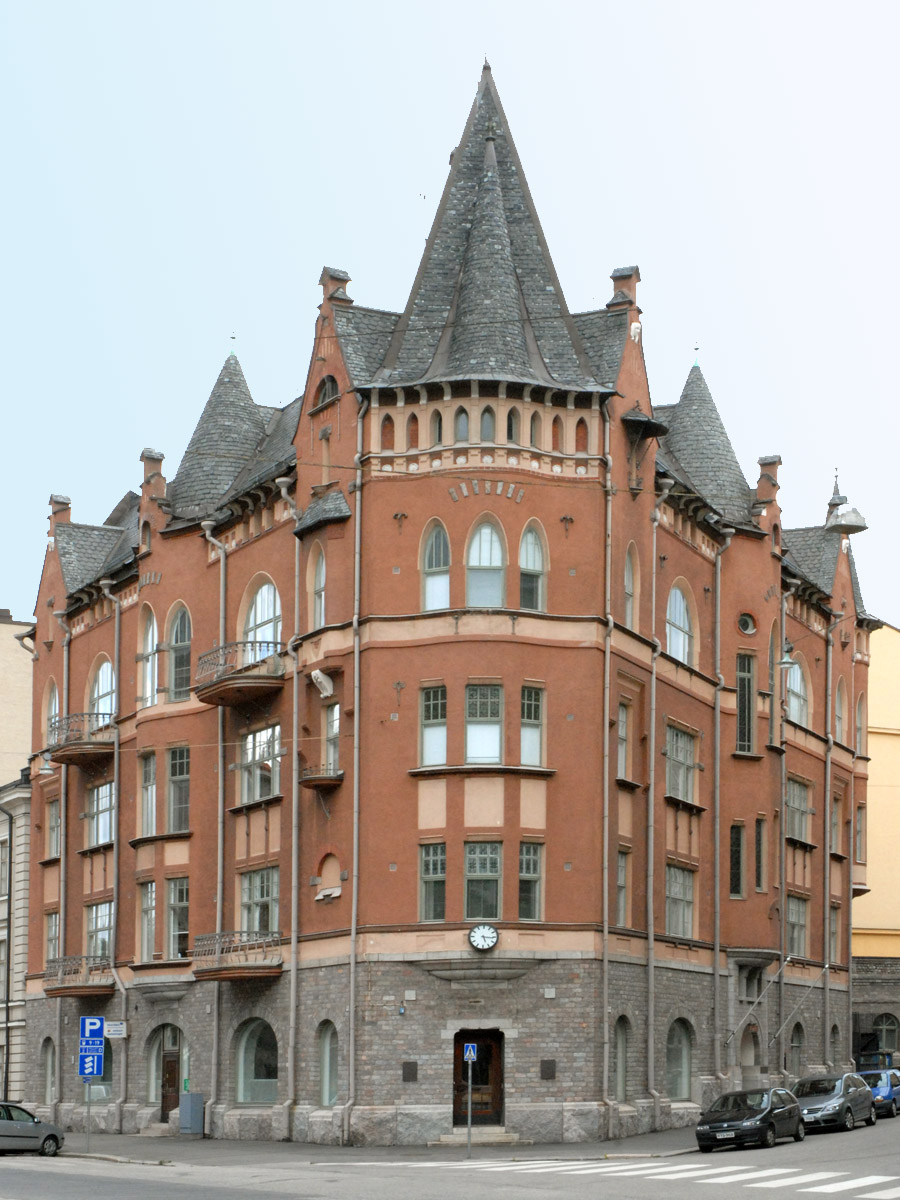
Jugendstil Building, Luotsikatu

Katajanokka is principally known for its fine examples of Jugendstil architecture. Other prominent styles apparent on the island are modernism, manifested in Alvar Aalto's Enso-Gutzeit Building, and the red-brick industrial former harbour buildings and prison (now a Best Western hotel).

== Politics ==
Results of the 2011 Finnish parliamentary election in Katajanokka:

- National Coalition Party 35.0%
- Green League 20.1%
- Social Democratic Party 13.0%
- Swedish People's Party 8.8%
- Left Alliance 8.8%
- True Finns 8.0%
- Centre Party 3.8%
- Christian Democrats 1.2%

== Sights ==
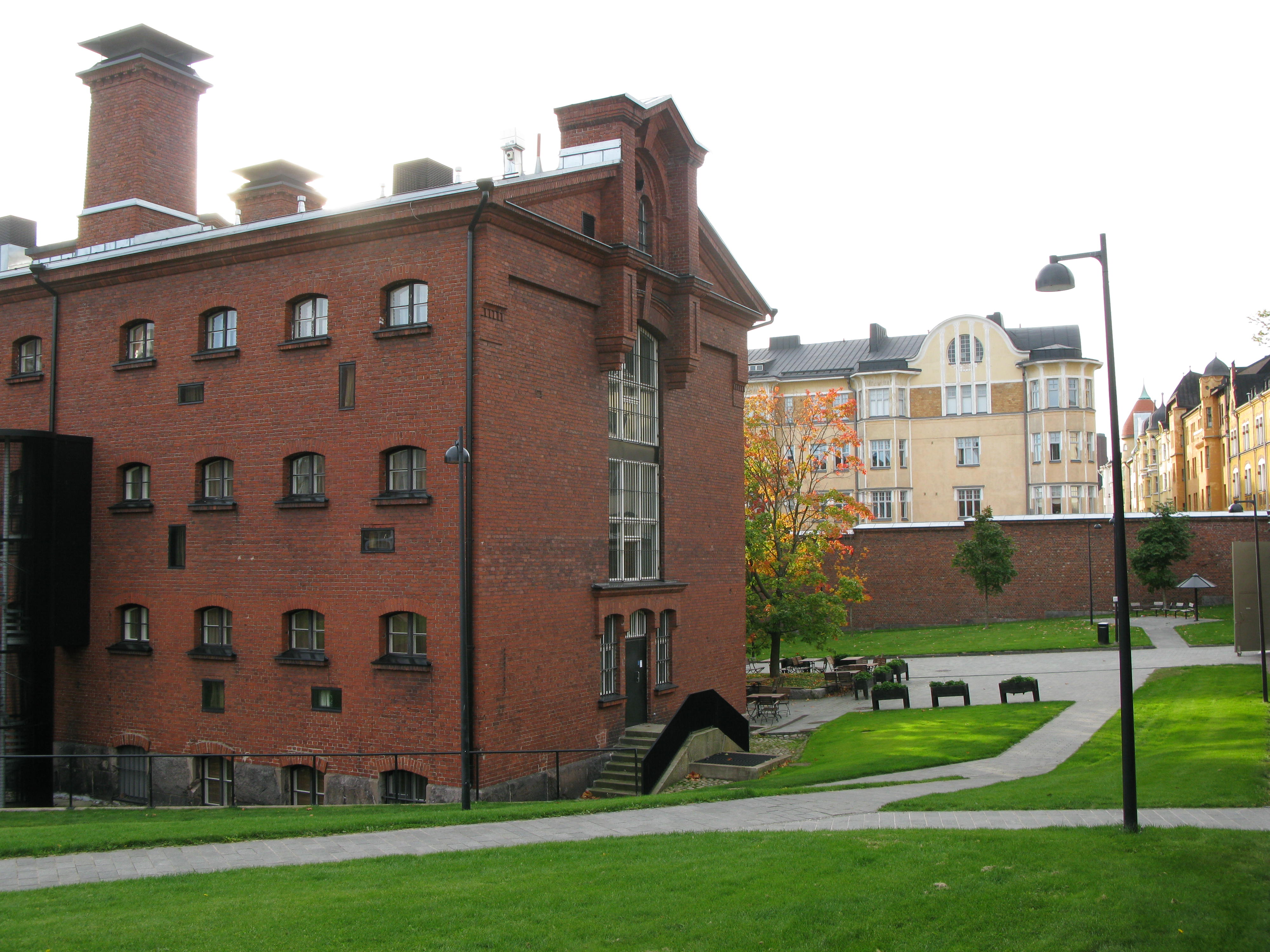
The former county prison of Helsinki has been renovated into a hotel.

- Allas Sea Pool
- Flying Cinema Tour of Helsinki, virtual cinema
- Finnida and the former building of the Mint of Finland (35)
- The former Helsinki County Prison and prison chapel (31)
- The icebreakers at the Merikasarmi pier (29)
- The Katajanokka primary school, formerly the riding hall of Merikasarmi (25)
- The Katajanokka Casino, 1911, formerly the officers' club of the Baltic Fleet of the Russian Empire (24)
- The Katajanokka warehouses (16)
- The Katajanokka Terminal (30)
- The Katajanokka warrant warehouses, now the Wanha Satama conference centre (32)
- SkyWheel Helsinki
- Residential building designed by Lars Sonck at the corner of Rahapajankatu and Satamakatu (17)
- The Stora Enso headquarters (36)
- The Uspenski Cathedral (15)
- The Warran House (33)

=== Art Nouveau houses in Katajanokka ===
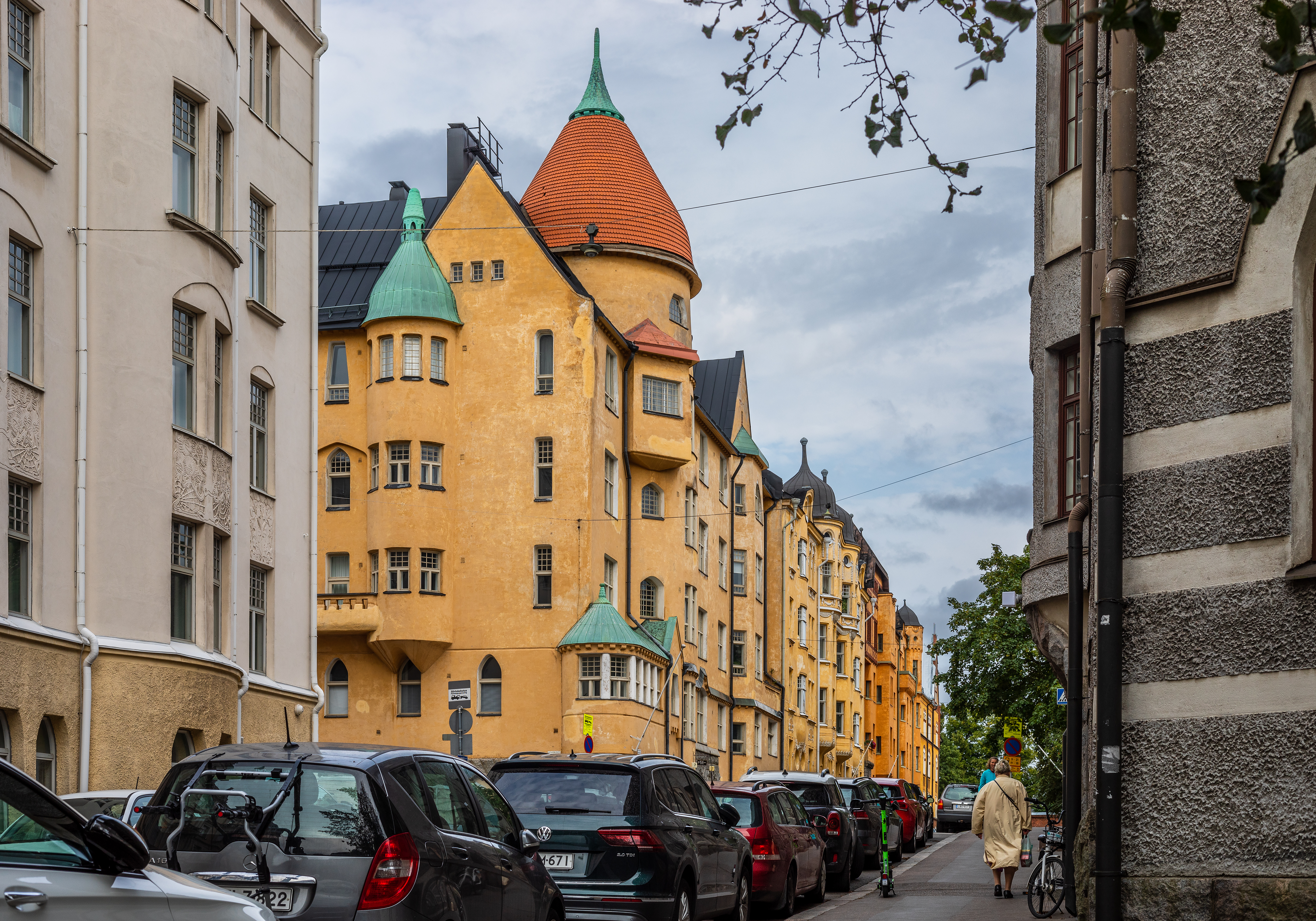
Art Nouveau architecture on Kauppiaankatu

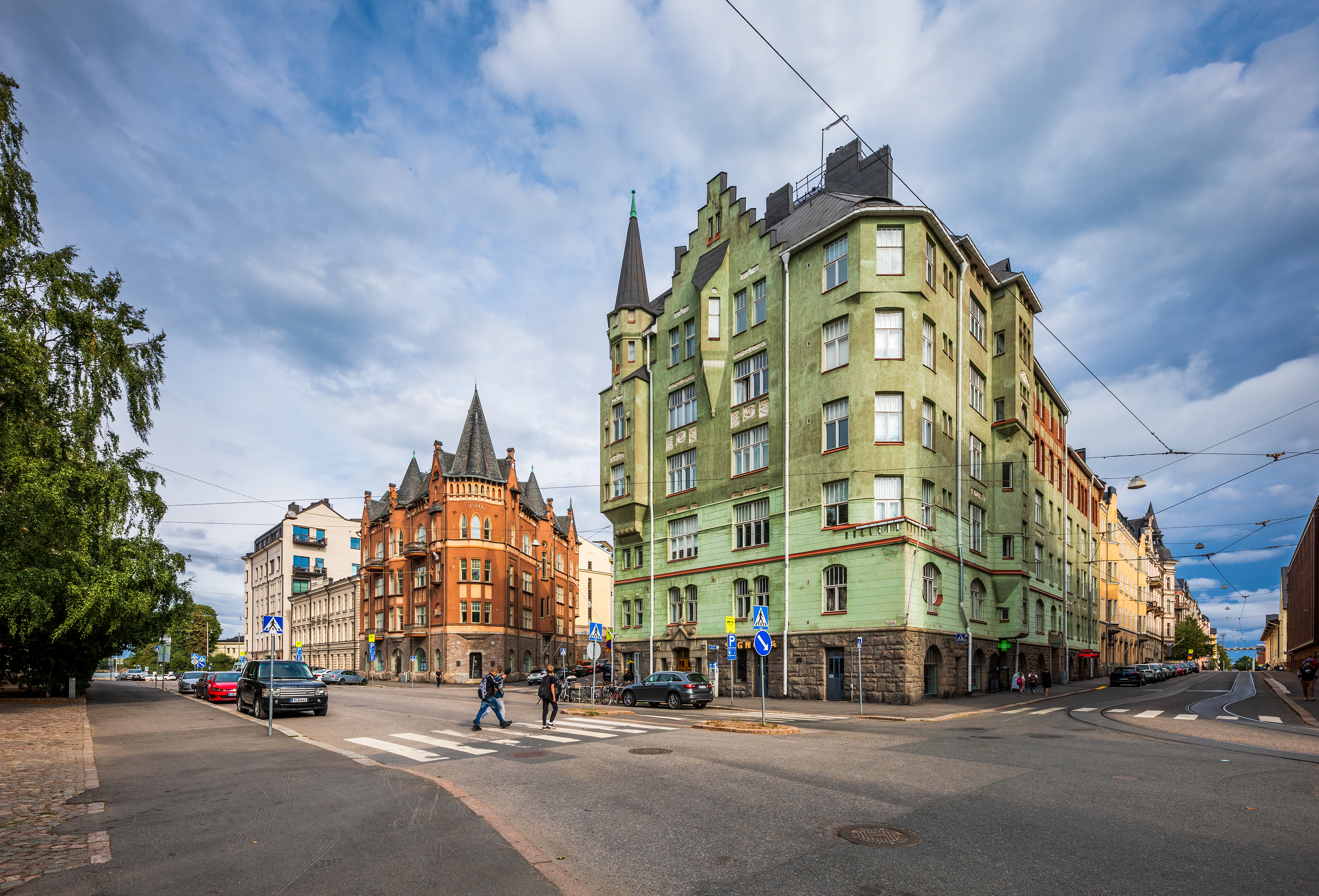
Houses on Satamakatu

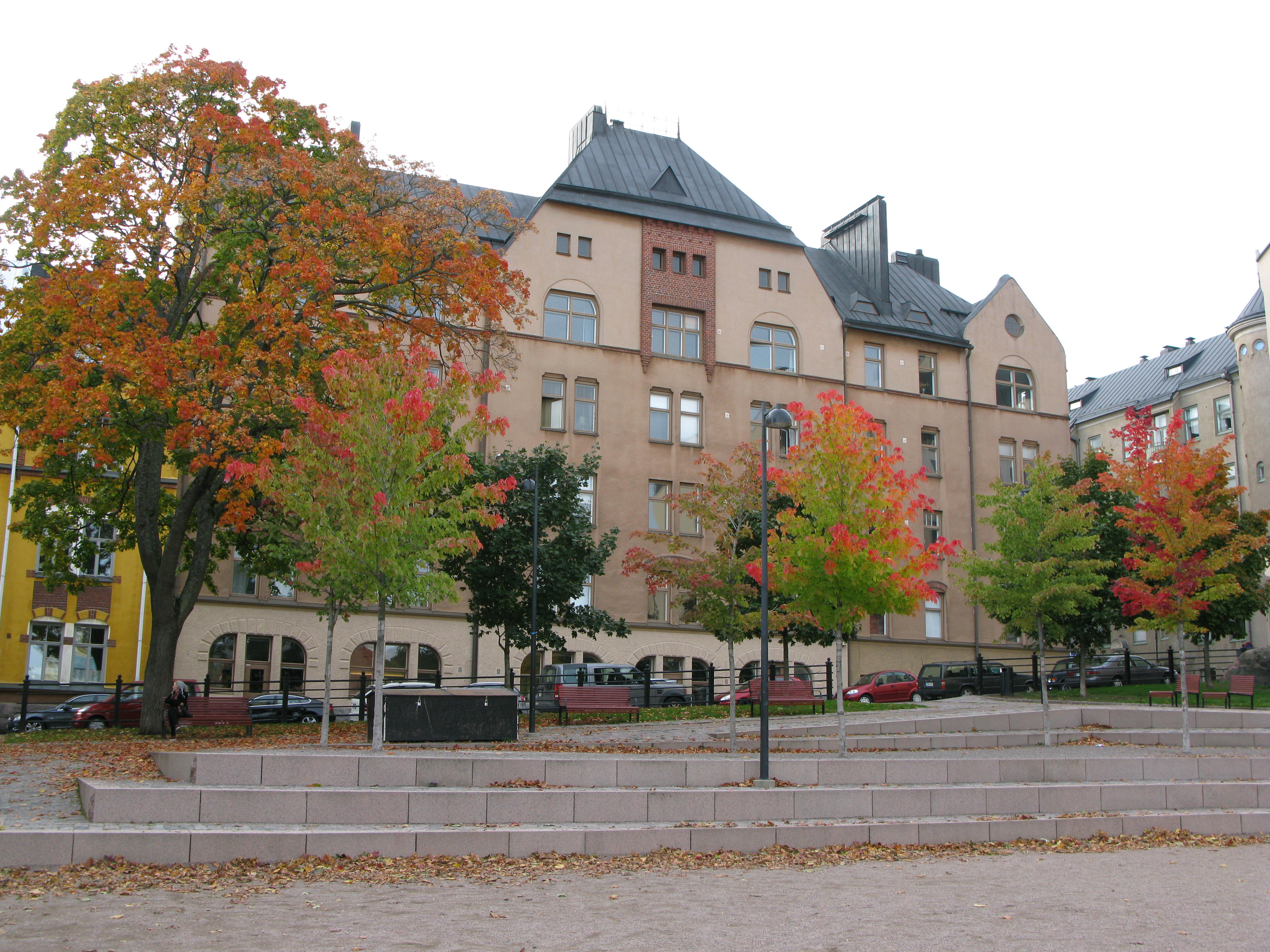
House of the housing cooperative Koitto on the corner of Luotsikatu and Vyökatu

- Aeolus (Selim A. Lindqvist 1903), (19)
- Alanko Linnankatu 2 (1906)
- Bellona (F. Oskar Helenius 1908)
- Eol (Gesellius, Lindgren, Saarinen 1903), (22)
- Fridborg (Gustaf Estlander 1904)
- Helsingfors Borg (Albert Nyberg 1904)
- Högborg Asunto Oy Luotsikatu 11 (Vilho Lekman 1904)
- Kataja (Usko Nyström, Petrelius & Penttilä 1902)
- Katajaniemi (Juho Rinne 1908, completed 1912)
- Katajisto (Edv. Löppönen 1908)
- Klinten As. Oy Luotsikatu 13
- Koitto (Oscar Bomanson and Bertel Jung 1904)
- Kolmio (K. S. Kallio and Emil Werner von Essen 1904)
- Kontio (Waldemar Wilenius 1898)
- Laivastokontu (von Essen, Kallio & Ikäläinen 1910)
- Liezen (Georg Wasastjerna and K. V. Polón 1903, 1905, 1910)
- Linna (von Essen, Kallio & Ikäläinen 1906)
- Louhi (E. Ikäläinen 1902)
- Luotsiola (Vilho Penttilä 1911)
- Norma (von Essen, Kallio & Ikäläinen 1904)
- Oihonna (Albert Nyberg 1905)
- Olofsborg (Gesellius, Lindgren, Saarinen 1903), (23)
- Panu (Georg Wasastjerna and K. V. Polón 1903)
- Semafor (Bruno Ferdinand Granholm 1903)
- Suomela (K. S. Kallio and Emil Werner von Essen 1906)
- Tallbergin talo (Gesellius, Lindgren, Saarinen, (18) 1897)
- Tuki (Heikki Kaartinen 1903)
- Turso (David Koponen 1907)
- Wellamo (Selim A. Lindqvist 1904)

The numbers refer to the target numbers of the tour map on the official site of the meeting organisers in the City of Helsinki.

== Gallery ==
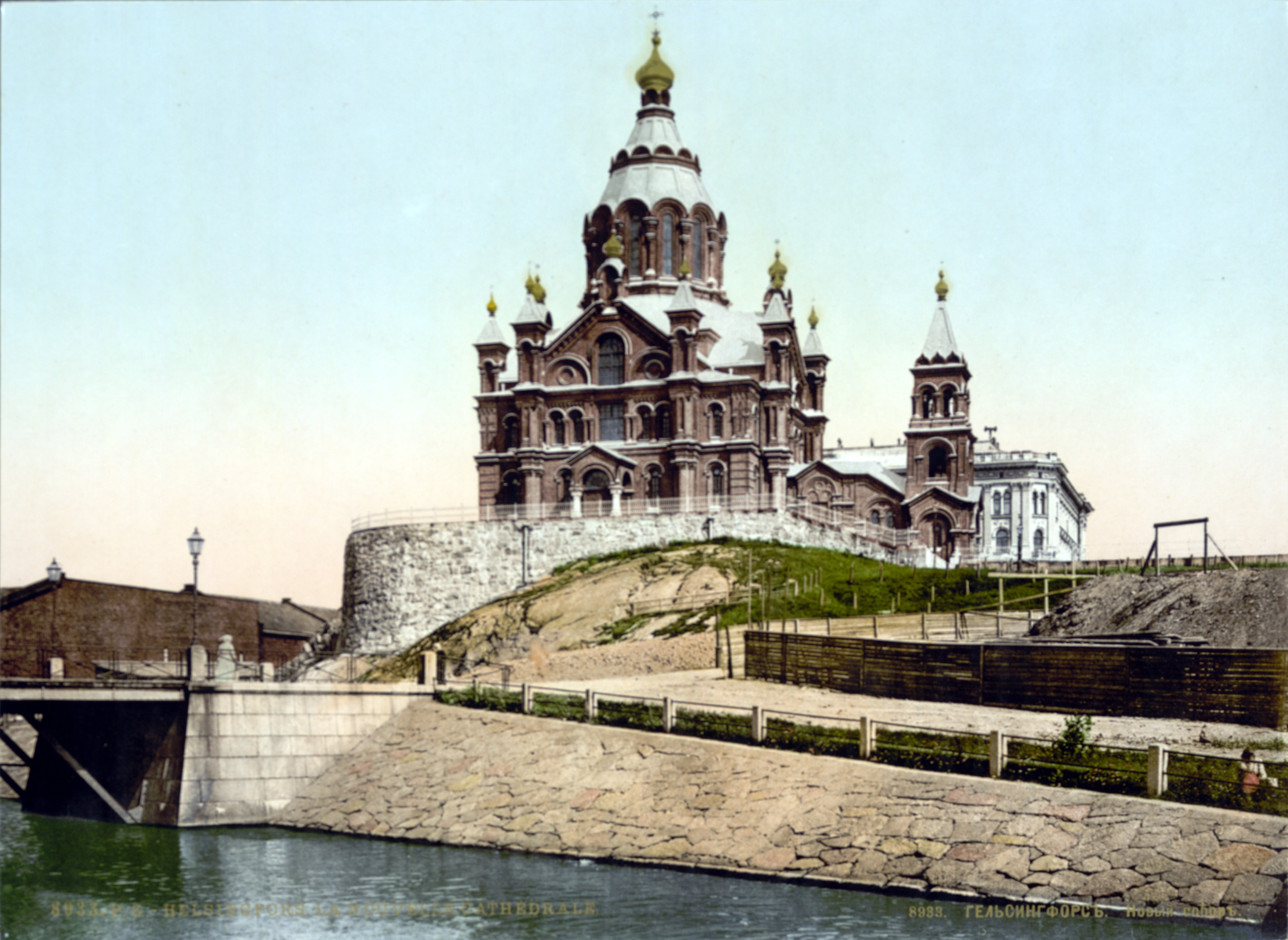
The Uspenski Cathedral during the turn of the 19th and 20th centuries.

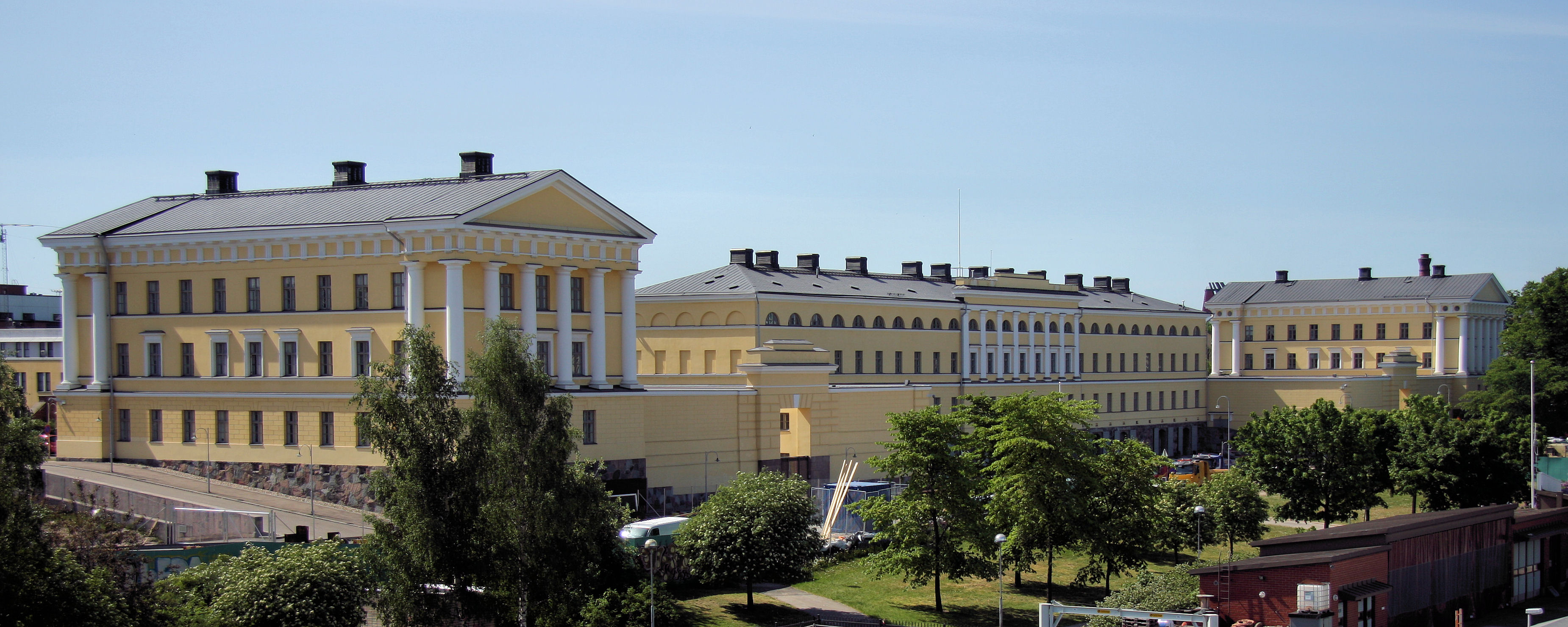
The Merikasarmi building houses the Ministry for Foreign Affairs.

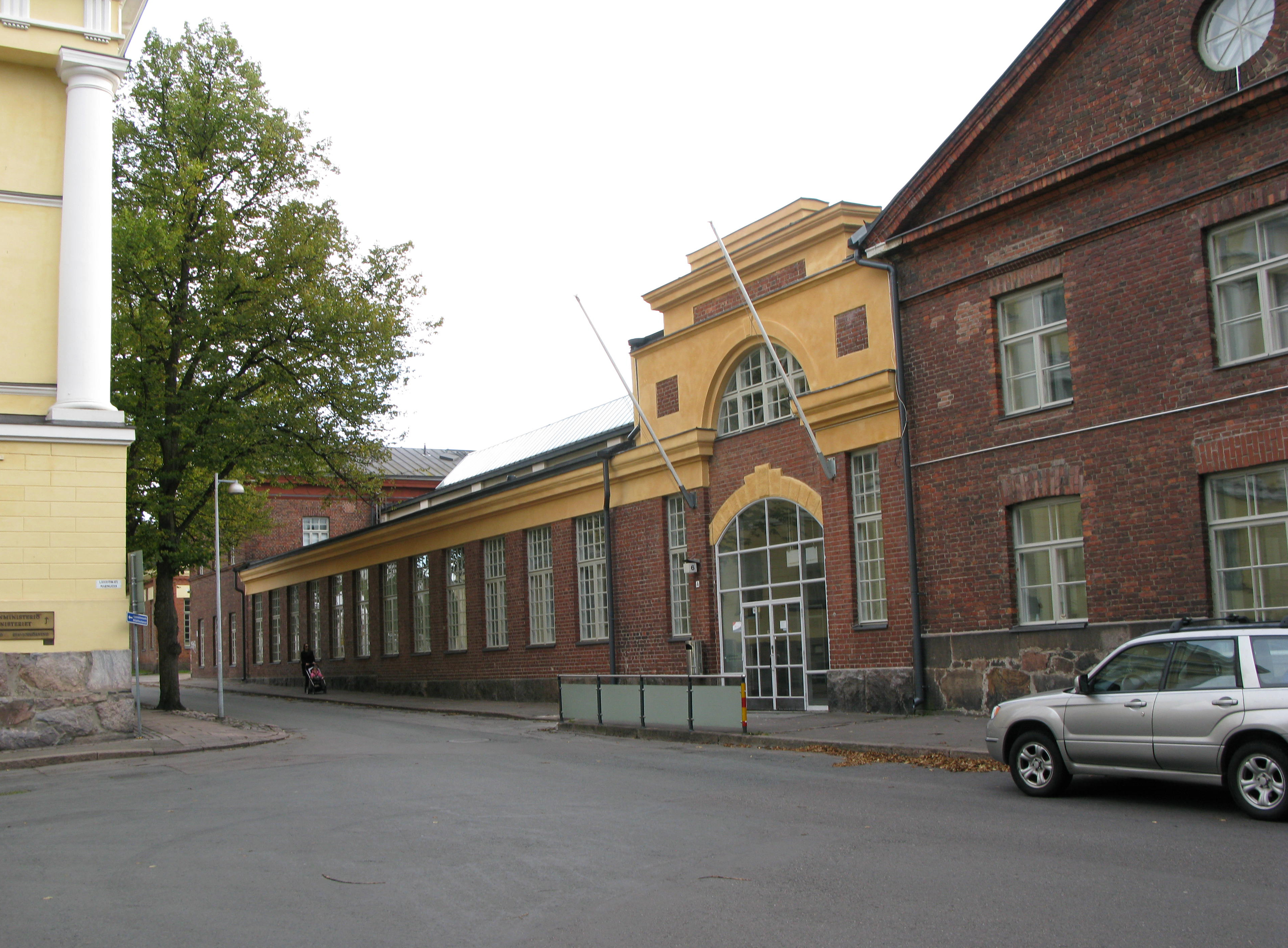
The old machinery workshop and armoury buildings have been renovated for the use of the Katajanokka elementary school.

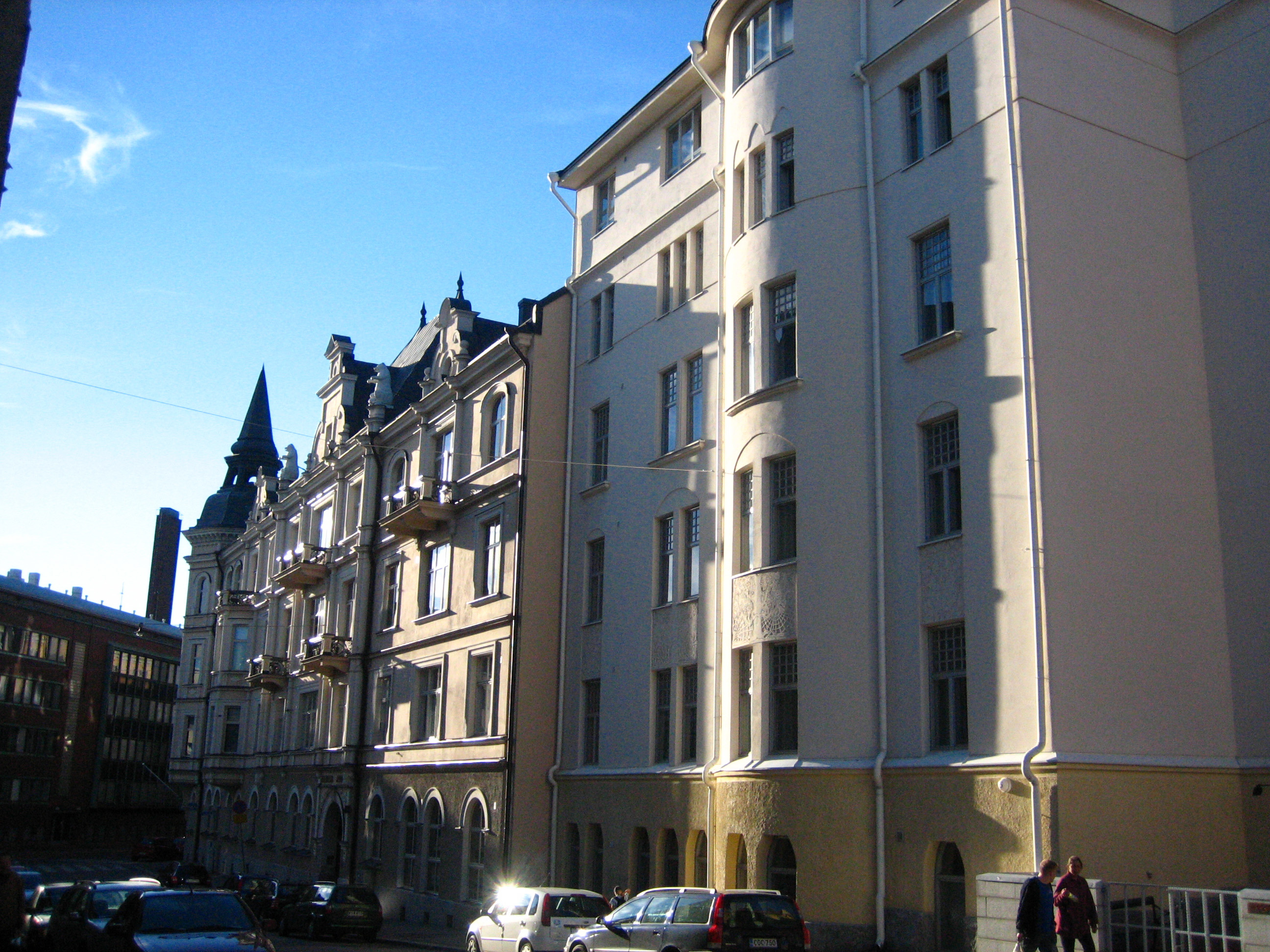
Kauppiaankatu to the west.

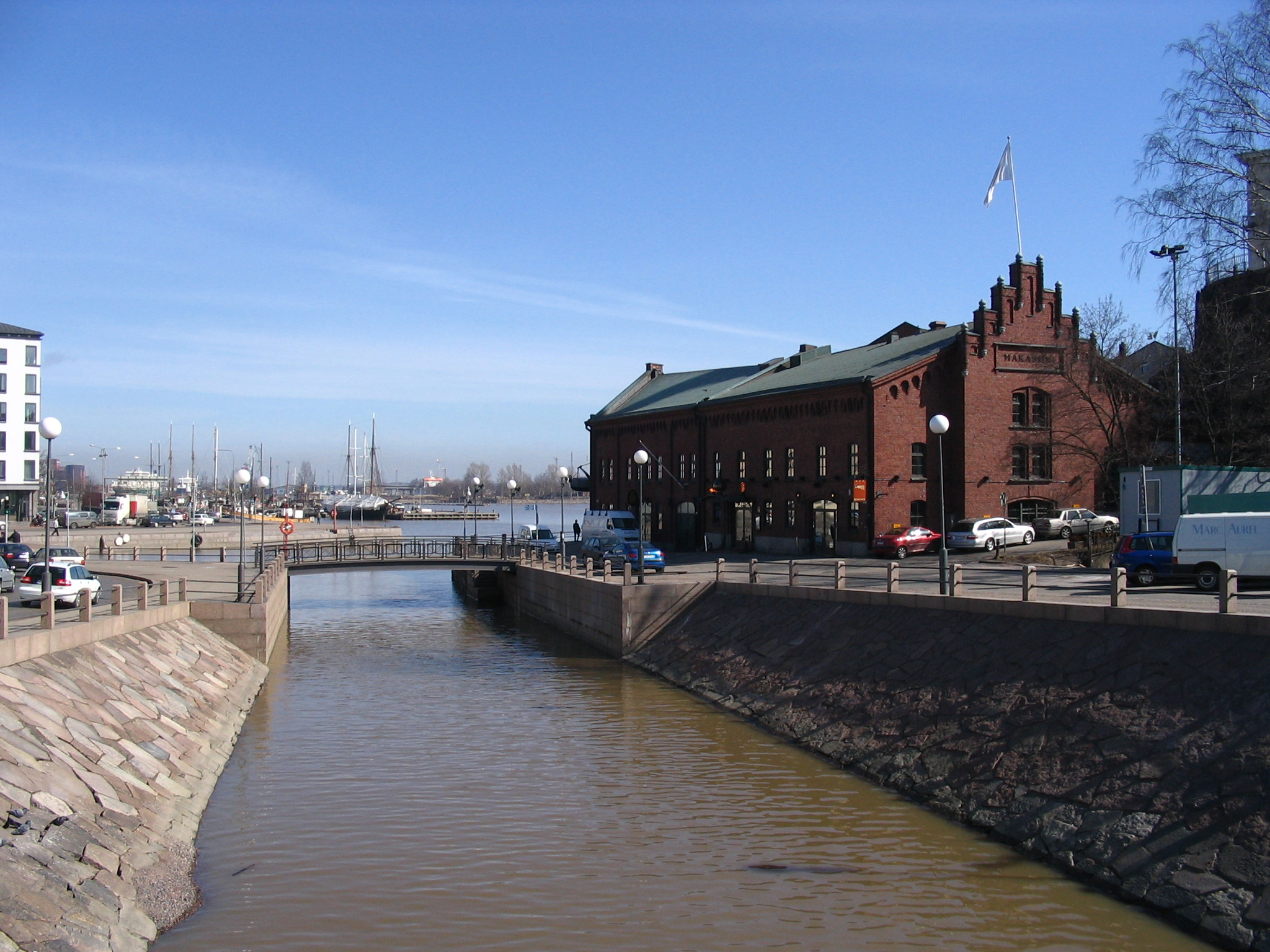
A view of the Katajanokka canal, with restaurant Sipuli in the background on the right.

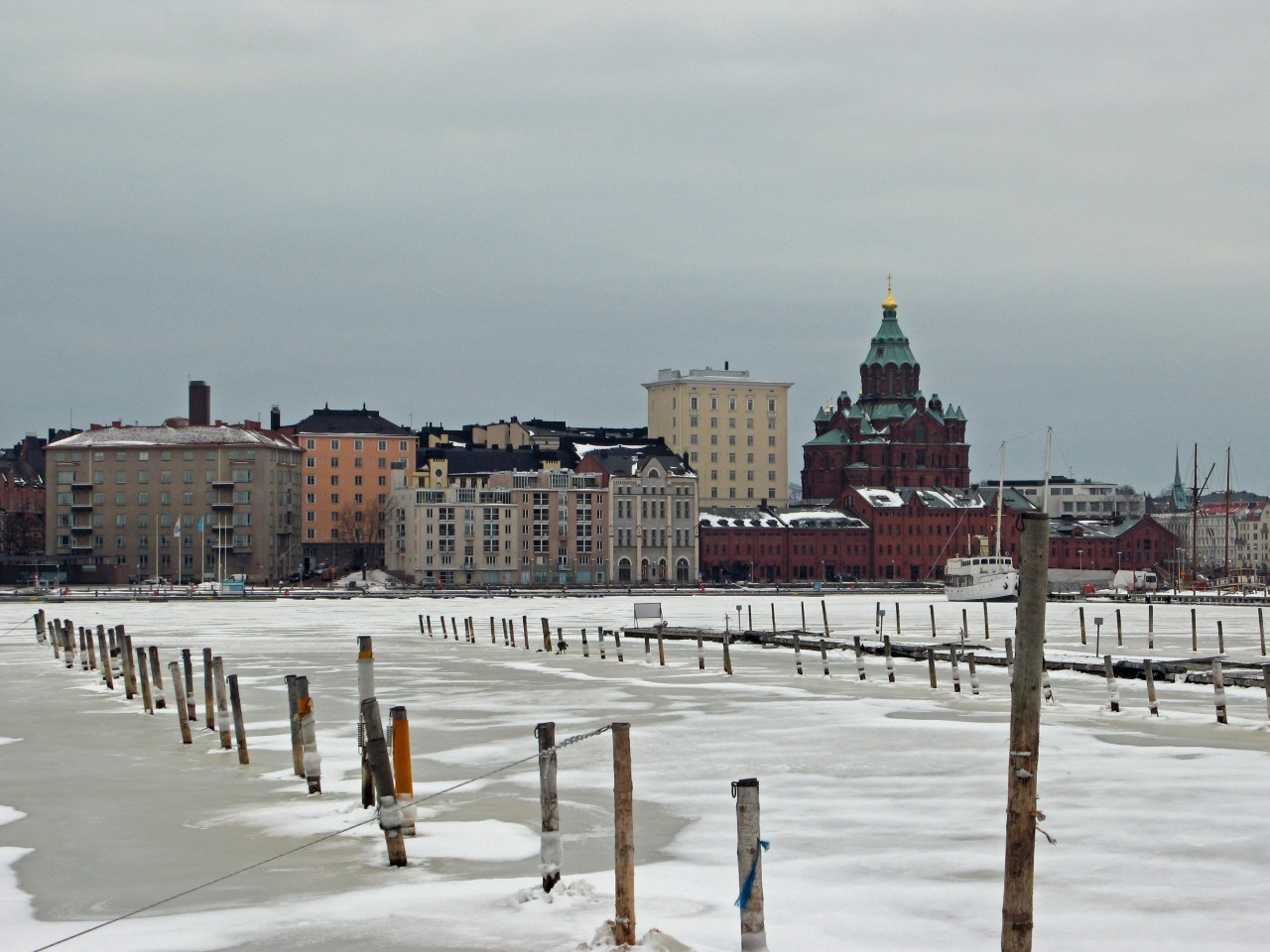
A view from the northern shore of Katajanokka.

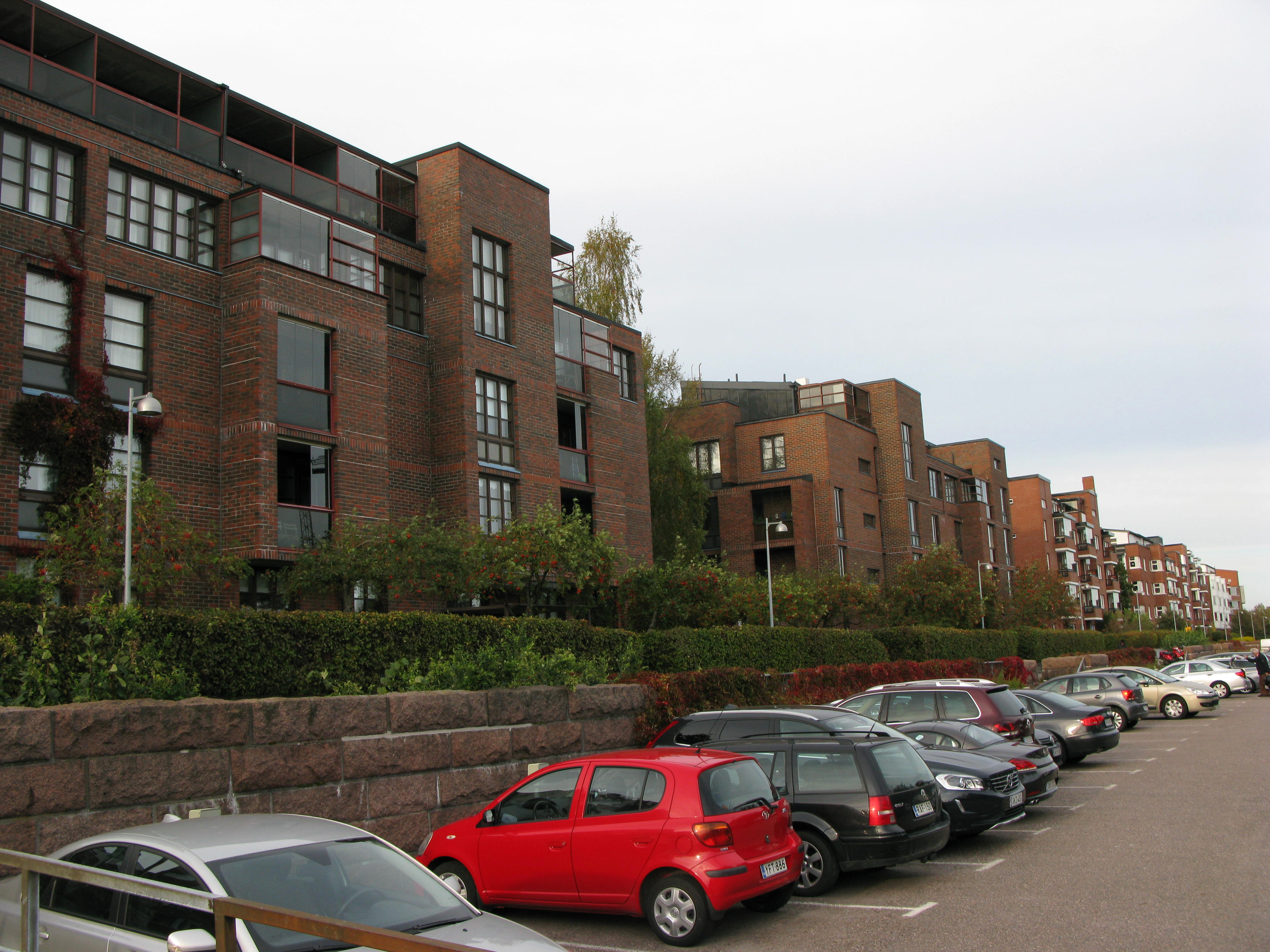
A row of red brick buildings on the "new side" of Katajanokka.

== Literature ==
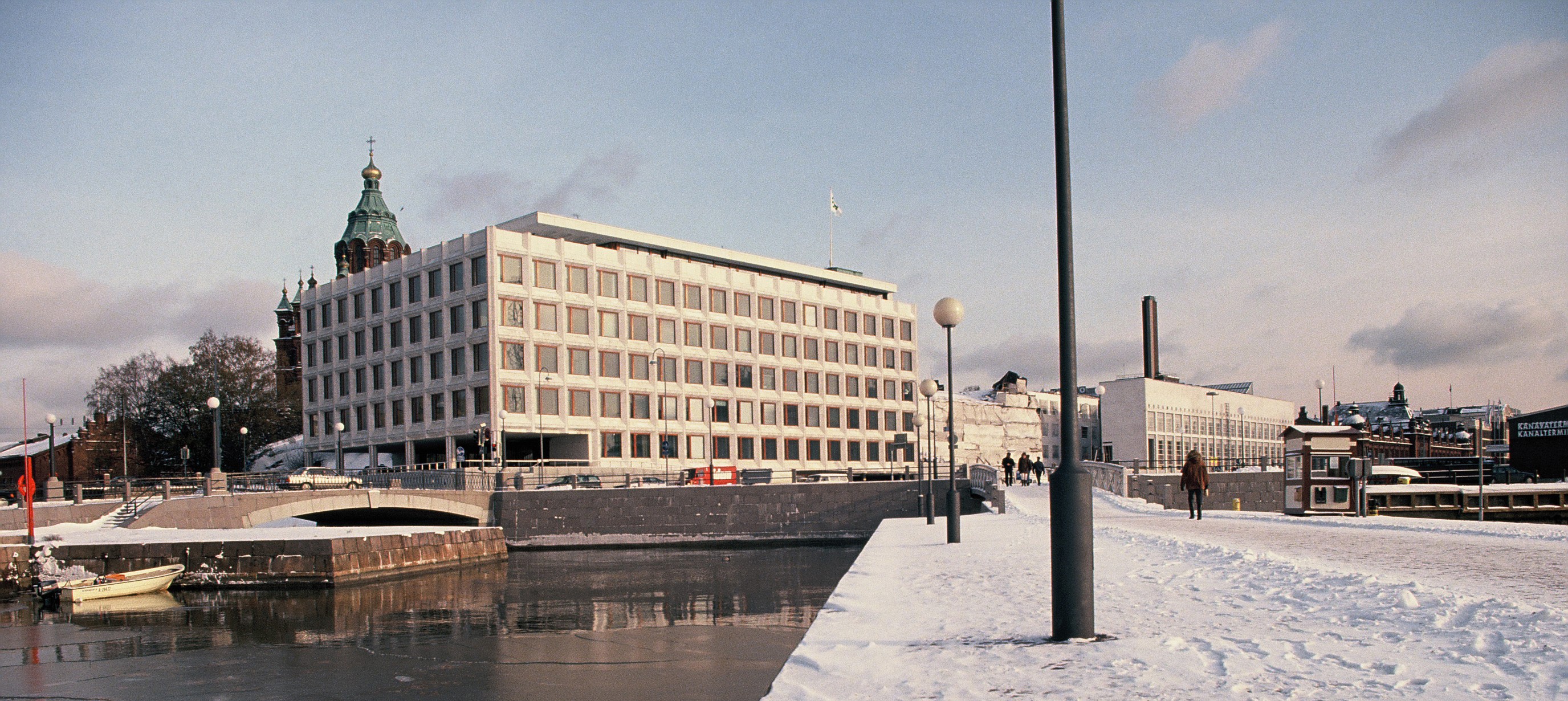
Enso-Gutzeit Building by Alvar Aalto, 1962

- Griffiths, Gareth (1997). The Polemical Aalto. The Enso-Gutzeit Building (1959–62), Datutop 19, Tampere. ISBN 951-722-789-2 (an account of the saga of Aalto's controversial building on Katajanokka.)
- Jaatinen, Carina & Lindh, Tommi & Lunkka, Hannu (1998). Helsingin kantakaupungin rakennuskulttuuri. Katajanokan kaupunginosan inventointi. Helsingin kaupunginmuseo. ISBN 951-718-174-4. (An examination of the architectural history of Katajanokka.)
- Kervanto Nevanlinna, Anja (2002). Kadonneen kaupungin jäljillä. Teollisuusyhteiskunnan muutoksia Helsingin historiallisessa ytimessä. ("Tracing the lost city. Industrial transformations in the historical heart of Helsinki. With summary and captions in English.") Suomalaisen Kirjallisuuden Seura. ISBN 951-746-307-3. (Takes a critical look at the 20th Century transformation of the Eteläsatama seafront in Helsinki, with an emphasis on Katajanokka.)
- Moorhouse, Jonathan & Carapetian, Michael & Ahtola-Moorhouse, Leena (1987). Helsinki Jugendstil 1895—1915. Otava Verlag. ISBN 951-1-08382-1. (Describes the architecture of Katajanokka, p. 198—228. Also available in Finnish as ISBN 951-1-09018-6.)
- Narinkka (1989). Helsinki City Museum. (A detailed exploration of the history of Katajanokka before the 20th Century. Written by Viljo Erkamo and Kerttuli Wessman. Includes an English summary, titled "Katajanokka's humble past. Old drawings and paintings: a documentary record of city ethnography".) ISSN 0355-9106.
- Ollila, Kaija & Toppari, Kirsti (1975): Puhvelista Punatulkkuun. Helsingin vanhoja kortteleita. Sanoma Osakeyhtiö. ISBN 951-9134-69-7. (Information and historical anecdotes on the city blocks and buildings of Helsinki. Covers the entire "Old Side" of Katajanokka, among other districts.)

== Articles in architectural journals ==
- Arkkitehti 1931. Frequently cited debate from the early 1930s regarding the state and the future of Katajanokka.
- Helander, Vilhelm & Pakkala, Pekka & Sundman, Mikael: Katajanokan kärjen asemakaavaluonnos. ("The draft plan for the 'tip of Katajanokka'"). Arkkitehti 2/1975, p. 32 pp. Early description of the winning plan for the "New Side" by the architects involved.
- Pakkala, Pekka: Katajanokan vanhan asuntoalueen asemakaava ("The plan for the old residential area of Katajanokka"). Arkkitehti 4/1981, p. 42 pp. Detailed article on the preservation of the "Old Side".
