= MSV Botnica =

Estonian multipurpose icebreaker

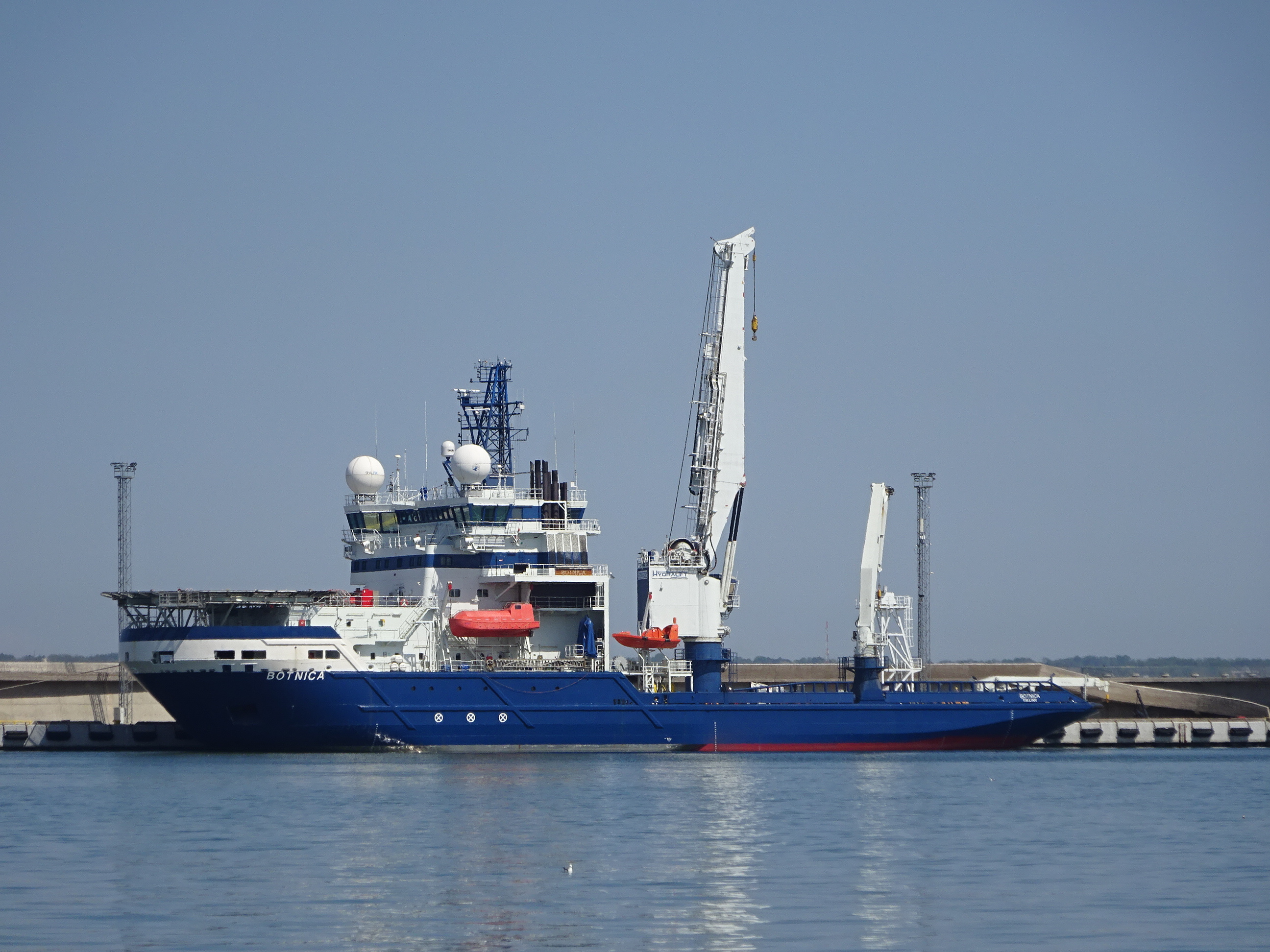
- Botnica moored in Old City Harbour in 2023.

History

Finland
- Name: Botnica
- Owner: Finnish Maritime Administration (1998–2004); Finstaship (2004–2010); Arctia Offshore (2010–2012)
- Port of registry: Helsinki, Finland
- Ordered: February 1997
- Builder: Finnyards Ltd., Rauma, Finland
- Cost: FIM 303 million
- Yard number: 421
- Laid down: 2 September 1997
- Launched: 20 February 1998
- Completed: 1 June 1998
- In service: 1998–2012
- Identification: Call sign: OJAK; IMO number: 9165877; MMSI number: 230904000
- Fate: Sold to Estonia in 2012

Estonia
- Owner: Port of Tallinn (2012–)
- Operator: TS Shipping
- Port of registry: Tallinn, Estonia
- Acquired: 28 November 2012
- Identification: Call sign: ESJV; IMO number: 9165877; MMSI number: 276805000
- Status: In service

General characteristics
- Type: Icebreaker, Offshore support vessel
- Tonnage: 6,370 GT; 1,911 NT; 2,890 DWT (offshore)
- Length: 96.70 m (317.3 ft)
- Beam: 24.00 m (78.7 ft)
- Draught: 7.20–7.80 m (23.6–25.6 ft) (icebreaker); 8.50 m (27.9 ft) (offshore)
- Depth: 11.70 m (38.4 ft)
- Ice class: DNV ICE-10 Icebreaker
- Installed power: 12 × Caterpillar 3512B DITA (12 × 1,258 kW)
- Propulsion: 2 × ABB Azipod VI1600A (2 × 5 MW); 3 × Brunvoll bow thrusters (3 × 1,150 kW)
- Speed: 16.5 knots (30.6 km/h; 19.0 mph) (max); 12 knots (22 km/h; 14 mph) (service); 8 knots (15 km/h; 9.2 mph) in 80 cm (31 in) ice
- Crew: 19 (winter); 23 (summer); Accommodation for 72 personnel
- Aviation facilities: Helipad

MSV Botnica is a multipurpose offshore support vessel and icebreaker built by Finnyards in Rauma, Finland in 1998. She was the newest and technically most advanced state-owned icebreaker of Finland until 2012, when she was sold to the Port of Tallinn, Estonia for 50 million euro. Botnica is used as an escort icebreaker in the Baltic Sea during the winter months and she carries out subsea and offshore construction works worldwide during the open water season.

== Design ==
=== General characteristics ===
The maximum overall length of Botnica is 96.70 metres (317.3 ft) and her length between perpendiculars is 77.51 metres (254.3 ft). The hull has a moulded breadth of 24 metres (78.7 ft) and depth of 11.7 metres (38.4 ft). The draught is 7.20 to 7.80 metres (23.6 to 25.6 ft) when the ship is acting as an icebreaker and 8.50 metres (27.9 ft) in offshore supply operations. The gross tonnage of Botnica is 6,370, net tonnage 1,911 and deadweight tonnage 2,890 tons. The light displacement of Botnica, i.e. the weight of the ship without consumables, cargo and crew, is 5,880 tons. Her loaded displacement varies according to the loading condition.

Botnica is classified by Det Norske Veritas with a class notation 1A1 ICE-10 Icebreaker SF HELDK RPS E0 DYNPOS-AUTRO DK(+) HL(1.8). Her ice class, ICE-10 Icebreaker, means that she is designed to break ice up to 1 metre (3.3 ft) thick without limitations to ramming. To improve the ship's maneuverability in ice her hull is wider at the bow than in the stern. These "reamers" increase the width of the ice channel and reduce friction between the hull and ice. The reamers are designed so that they create minimum additional resistance in the astern mode by breaking ice downwards. In addition the hull has an explosion-welded stainless steel ice belt that reduces friction and protects the steel plates from abrasion at the waterline. The hull is coated with low-friction Inerta 160 epoxy paint.

The ship's design, with the maximum breadth in the foreship and a narrower hull aftship, provides this multipurpose vessel with good seakeeping characteristics. Traditionally icebreakers have had, due to their broad beam and relatively shallow hull, a very short roll period in waves, which makes working on board the vessel extremely difficult due to its violent motions. The solution with narrow breadth in the aftship results in a sufficiently long roll period. At the midship and aft ship area there are also exceptionally wide bilge shelves as an integral part of the hull, to further dampen the rolling.

Overall, the design provides the vessel with excellent icebreaking capability combined with the necessary stability, seaworthiness and low motions for offshore work.

For offshore construction projects Botnica was built with a 160-ton Hydralift ASA crane, but it was replaced in 2010 with a 150-ton MacGregor crane with active heave compensation. The vessel can also be equipped with an optional 120-ton A-frame. The 1,000-square-metre (10,764 sq ft) aft deck can be used for various purposes and the ship has a 6.5-by-6.5-metre (21 ft × 21 ft) moon pool for underwater operations. In addition the ship has a helipad and accommodation for 45–47 workers in addition to the ship's crew, which is increased from 19 to 23 during the summer season. Since Botnica acts as an escort icebreaker during the winter season, she is also equipped with a 210-ton Aquamaster-Rauma towing winch and stern notch for assisting merchant ships. The oblique bridge maximizes visibility from the starboard side steering position.

=== Power and propulsion ===
Botnica is powered by six engine-generator-engine sets consisting of twelve 51.8-litre (3,160-cubic-inch) Caterpillar 3512B V12 high-speed diesel engines, each with an output of 1,258 kW (1,687 hp), driving six ABB generators. The ship was originally designed for six bigger Wärtsilä generating sets, but the lower initial acquisition cost of the Caterpillars resulted in the very unusual engine arrangement. While having a large number of smaller engines increases the flexibility and efficiency of the power system — engines can be started and stopped on demand and the running engines operate at maximum efficiency — the main engines of Botnica require considerably more maintenance hours in comparison to ships with fewer generating sets. The fuel consumption of the main engines at maximum draught is 50 tons of marine diesel oil (MDO) per day at full power, 25 tons at a service speed of 12 knots (22 km/h; 14 mph), 10–15 tons during dynamic positioning and 4 tons at port.

Designed according to the power plant principle in which the main engines produce power for all shipboard consumers, Botnica has no separate auxiliary generators. However, there is a smaller six-cylinder Caterpillar 3406 as an emergency diesel generator with an output of 230 kW (310 hp).

Botnica was one of the first icebreakers to be equipped with Azipod propulsion, ABB's brand of electric azimuth thrusters developed in Finland. The two 5 MW Azipod VI1600A units considerably improve the maneuverability of the icebreaker — the tactical diameter of the turning circle in open water is less than the overall length of the ship. This is especially useful during escort and assistance operations in difficult ice conditions when the icebreaker has to operate at close proximity to other vessels at low speeds. Together with three 1,150-kW Brunvoll FU-80-LTC-2000 variable-pitch bow thrusters the azimuth thrusters also allow dynamic positioning during offshore operations. The bow thrusters are not used in ice.

The maximum speed of Botnica is 16.5 knots (30.6 km/h; 19.0 mph) in open water and she can maintain a speed of 8 knots (15 km/h; 9.2 mph) in 80 cm (31 in) ice. The maximum ice thickness in which the vessel is capable of maintaining constant speed is 1.2 m (47 in). Her bollard pull is 117 tons.

== History ==
=== Development and construction ===
The development of the Finnish multipurpose icebreakers began in the mid-1980s when the Finnish National Board of Navigation launched a project to find secondary uses for the new vessels it was planning to build as a replacement for some of the oldest icebreakers. Until then the Finnish icebreakers had been designed solely for escort operations in ice-infested waters and their specialized hull form was not suitable for open water. As a result, the existing icebreakers had an effective operational time of only three to five months per year and spent the summer season moored at Katajanokka in Helsinki. A multipurpose application of the new icebreakers would thus result in a better utilization of the vessels and, assuming they were chartered by a commercial third party during the summer, improve the economics of the state-owned fleet.

However, the concept did not become reality until the early 1990s, when the Norwegian company Ugland Offshore AS (later DSND Offshore AS) became involved in the project to develop and construct multipurpose icebreakers that could be used for offshore operations in the oil fields during the summer months. The concept was developed by the Board of Navigation together with a Finnish consulting engineering company ILS and the contract for the construction of the first vessel with an option for a sister ship was signed with Finnyards in October 1991. The second vessel was ordered in June 1992. The 116-metre (381 ft) ships had large open aft decks similar to platform supply vessels and their two 7,500 kW diesel-electric Aquamaster Z-drive azimuth thrusters provided dynamic positioning capability. The first Finnish multipurpose icebreaker, Fennica, was delivered in 1993 and her sister ship, Nordica, in the following year.

The third multipurpose icebreaker Botnica was designed mainly for Gulf of Finland escort icebreaking. Its summer tasks were planned in cooperation with DSND Offshore AS, and the discussion led to the conclusion that this type of vessel could be used as a cost-effective alternative to semi-submersible platforms for North Sea operators. The new light well intervention and slim hole drilling tasks brought in extra safety requirements, including explosion proof main deck arrangement and A-class bulkhead against deckhouse and lifesaving equipment because of a blow out risk. The vessel was designed into highest redundant DP class, with also machinery, thruster and DP control rooms divided into two independent spaces. A moon pool was designed in the vessel already in an earlier stage of the design, and among needed special equipment was e.g. a removable derrick. Other summer period offshore tasks included e.g. ROV support, hoisting of umbilicals, and offshore construction tasks.

In February 1997 the Finnish National Board of Navigation signed a contract worth FIM 303 million with Finnyards for the construction of a new multipurpose icebreaker. While initially only FIM 280 million was reserved for the new icebreaker, this was later increased by FIM 23 million as the planned vessel proved to be more expensive than expected. While an open call for bids was arranged by the Board of Navigation as dictated by the European Union rules, only Finnyards and Kværner Masa-Yards, another Finnish shipyard, sent in their tenders, and Finnyards won the contract because of shorter delivery time. The new multipurpose icebreaker was to be delivered in March–April 1998. Also designed by ILS, the new vessel resembles the older Finnish multipurpose icebreakers, but is slightly smaller, less powerful and has open-propeller Azipod units instead of Aquamasters with ducted propellers as the latter had proved to be problematic in ice.

The new multipurpose icebreaker was given the name Botnica and delivered to the Finnish National Board of Navigation in June 1998, slightly late of the original schedule. Until the recent delivery of the new icebreaker/tug Ahto, Botnica was the newest icebreaker to be commissioned in Finland.

=== Career ===
==== Finland (1998–2012) ====
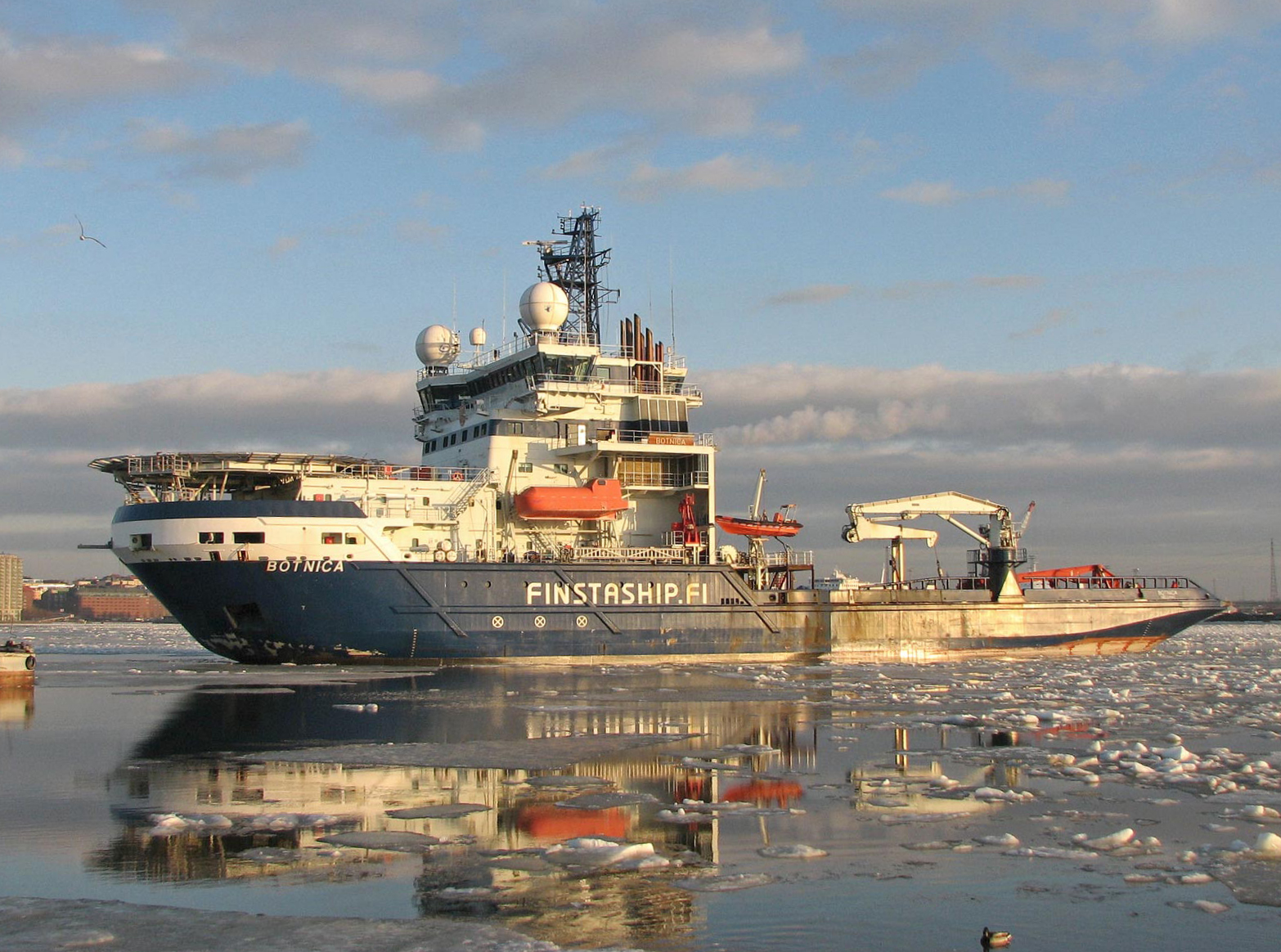
Botnica in Finnish service in 2007.

Like the older Finnish multipurpose icebreakers, Botnica was chartered to DSND Offshore AS for 180 days per year, while in the winter months she was employed as a traditional escort icebreaker in the Baltic Sea. Once icebreaker assistance was no longer needed, the offshore construction equipment was re-installed and the vessel left the Baltic Sea for the summer season. In 2002 Halliburton Offshore and DSND combined their resources and the charter of the multipurpose icebreakers was transferred to the new company, Subsea 7. Until 2004 the company had the exclusive rights to charter the Finnish multipurpose icebreakers.

Following the reorganization of the Finnish Maritime Administration in 2004 the ownership and management of the state-owned vessels was transferred to a newly founded state-owned enterprise, Finstaship. Later a separate company, GDV Maritime AS, was established together with Norwegian partners to handle the global marketing of the Finnish multipurpose icebreakers. Finstaship's share of the new company was 34%. In 2005 Botnica was chartered to TSMarine for offshore operations in the North Sea. The contract specified that the vessel would spend "at least" 560 days in offshore operations between 2005 and 2007. Later she also received charters from other companies, but the particularly poor season in 2008–2009 left Botnica laid up for months and forced Finstaship to reduce costs and even consider laying off some employees. She was also not used for icebreaking during the particularly mild winters in the late 2000s.

In 2010, Arctia Shipping Oy, a state-owned limited company, took over the operations of Finstaship. The ownership and management of the Finnish multipurpose icebreakers was transferred to a subsidiary company, Arctia Offshore Oy. Botnica was not contracted for icebreaking during the winter season of 2010, and having been left without a charter for offshore work, she was laid up in Trieste, Italy. While during the particularly harsh winter of 2011 Botnica was again employed as an icebreaker in the Baltic Sea, her icebreaking contract was not renewed for the 2012 season — instead the Finnish Transport Agency decided to charter Zeus, a small icebreaking anchor handling tug supply vessel (AHTS) owned by the Finnish towing and salvage company Alfons Håkans, until 2016. The agency also entered a similar agreement with a large Swedish icebreaker.

==== Estonia (2012–present) ====
On 24 October 2012, the Port of Tallinn purchased Botnica for 50 million euro to replace the 1963-built Tarmo. According to Arctia Shipping, the newest state-owned icebreaker was sold because the company has been unable to find profitable long-term charters for the multipurpose vessel. Botnica changed her port of registry to Estonia on 28 November 2012. Botnica has been contracted to provide icebreaking services in the Gulf of Finland until 20 April 2032.

The operator of Botnica is TS Shipping Ltd. Botnica is operated as a multipurpose icebreaker. In 2013 Botnica was involved in air diving works in the North Sea renewables sector, and in 2014 she was supporting a drilling campaign in Kara Sea conducting ice management, accommodation, and ROV duties.

In 2018, Botnica was chartered to Baffinland Iron Mines to support iron ore shipments from Milne Inlet by escorting Panamax type bulk carriers and providing ice monitoring, pollution monitoring, and emergency services between July and end of October each year. The contract had an option for summers 2019–2022, all of which were utilized. During the 2021 season, Botnica also supported various surface and underwater surveys. In December 2023, Baffinland Iron Mines called options to extend the five-year framework agreement to cover the 2023 shipping season and to shorten the charter.

In June 2023, Botnica was chartered by Equinor for 40 days with a 10-day extension option to support offshore wind farm maintenance work in the United Kingdom. However, due to technical challenges the charter was terminated prematurely on 3 July. Shortly afterwards, BP chartered Botnica as a service operation vessel for the company's normally unmanned installation at the Mungo field from 7 August until 3 September. Afterwards, Botnica departed for Canada for the rest of the summer season.

In 2024, Botnica will be again chartered by BP from May to July with option to extend the charter until 5 August. The charter with Baffinland has also been extended to cover the period between 2024 and 2028 with minimum 60-day charter period from September until December each year. However, in February 2025 Baffinland decided to waive the call option for the 2025 season as the mining company will focus on developing the Steensby Inlet railway project. The call option for the 2026 season was waived for the same reason in January 2026.

In September 2025, Botnica was chartered by Atlantic Towing to support the salvage operation of the Dutch-flagged freighter Thamesborg that ran aground on the Northwest Passage on 6 September.

In the summer of 2026, Botnica was chartered by Offshore-Tech Sweden to support diving operations in the North Sea for up to 26 days. In September 2026, Botnica was awarded a 30-day charter as an accommodation vessel in the North Sea by Aibel Seatrium Consortium ANS.

In May 2027, Botnica will be chartered to support single buoy mooring changeover operation in South Africa.

=== Controversies ===
In the early 2000s the managing director Kyösti Vesterinen and several other high-ranking members of the Finnish Maritime Administration were caught in a bribery scandal when it was found out that DSND Offshore, the charterer of the Finnish multipurpose icebreakers, had offered them several private trips around the world. At the same time the offshore company, which had failed to make payments for the charters in time, was forgiven 153,000 euros of penalty interests. As a result, Vesterinen and two other officials were found guilty for corruption and as a result lost their positions, were given suspended sentences of four to ten months and had to pay back the unlawfully obtained benefits. The incident ended the co-operation between DSND and the Finnish Maritime Administration and left many people suspicious about the profitability of the multipurpose icebreakers.

In December 2003 the Finnish-Swedish ice class of Botnica was unexpectedly downgraded from 1A Super to III, the lowest possible ice class, which is mainly used for barges and other vessels unsuitable for navigation in ice. Since the icebreaker is built to DNV's ICE-10 ice class, which far exceeds the requirements for the highest Finnish-Swedish ice class, this was not due to any technical or structural issue, but a problem with the ship's paperwork. Botnica operates at different draughts depending on her mission, and when returning to Finland from abroad her true main dimensions were found out to be different from those stated in the ship's documentation. As a result, the maritime inspector of the Finnish Maritime Administration had no other choice but to downgrade the ship's ice classification to the lowest possible ice class. The missing documents were delivered and the correct ice class was restored shortly afterwards.

After Botnica had been purchased by the Port of Tallinn, the Estonian state-owned company became the center of a bribery scandal involving the company's top executives. In February 2016, the parliamentary committee of investigation decided to open a criminal case after suspecting that the evaluation of the Finnish icebreaker prior to acquisition had been incorrect and biased, and as a result, the Port of Tallinn purchased the vessel for 50 million euro while a more realistic price for the 14-year-old icebreaker would have been 30 to 35 million euro.

== Criticism ==
Although the crews have been generally satisfied with the vessels' operational capabilities, the multipurpose icebreakers have also been perceived as compromise designs due to the conflicting requirements of icebreaking and offshore operations. The vessels have been criticized for their lower icebreaking capability and ability to operate in the Bothnian Bay ice conditions characterized by heavy ridging when compared to traditional icebreakers built in the 1970s. Designed primarily for icebreaking operations in the Gulf of Finland, Botnica has been described as "underpowered" by her crew because she is as wide as the older Finnish icebreakers but has only two thirds of the propulsion power. While Botnica has also been praised for her seakeeping characteristics, in open water operations the multipurpose icebreakers have not been competitive against purpose-built offshore vessels due to their higher fuel consumption.

The Finnish state-owned shipping company Arctia and its predecessors were also criticized for the financial losses and low profitability of the offshore business. Unable to compete commercially against purpose-built offshore vessels, the multipurpose icebreakers were the last ones to be hired unless they were offered at significantly reduced day rates. Sometimes the ships were left without contracts and Botnica in particular spent long periods of time in foreign ports even during the Baltic Sea winter navigation season, forcing the government of Finland to hire icebreakers from the commercial market to keep the ports open.
