= Polaris (icebreaker) =

Finnish icebreaker

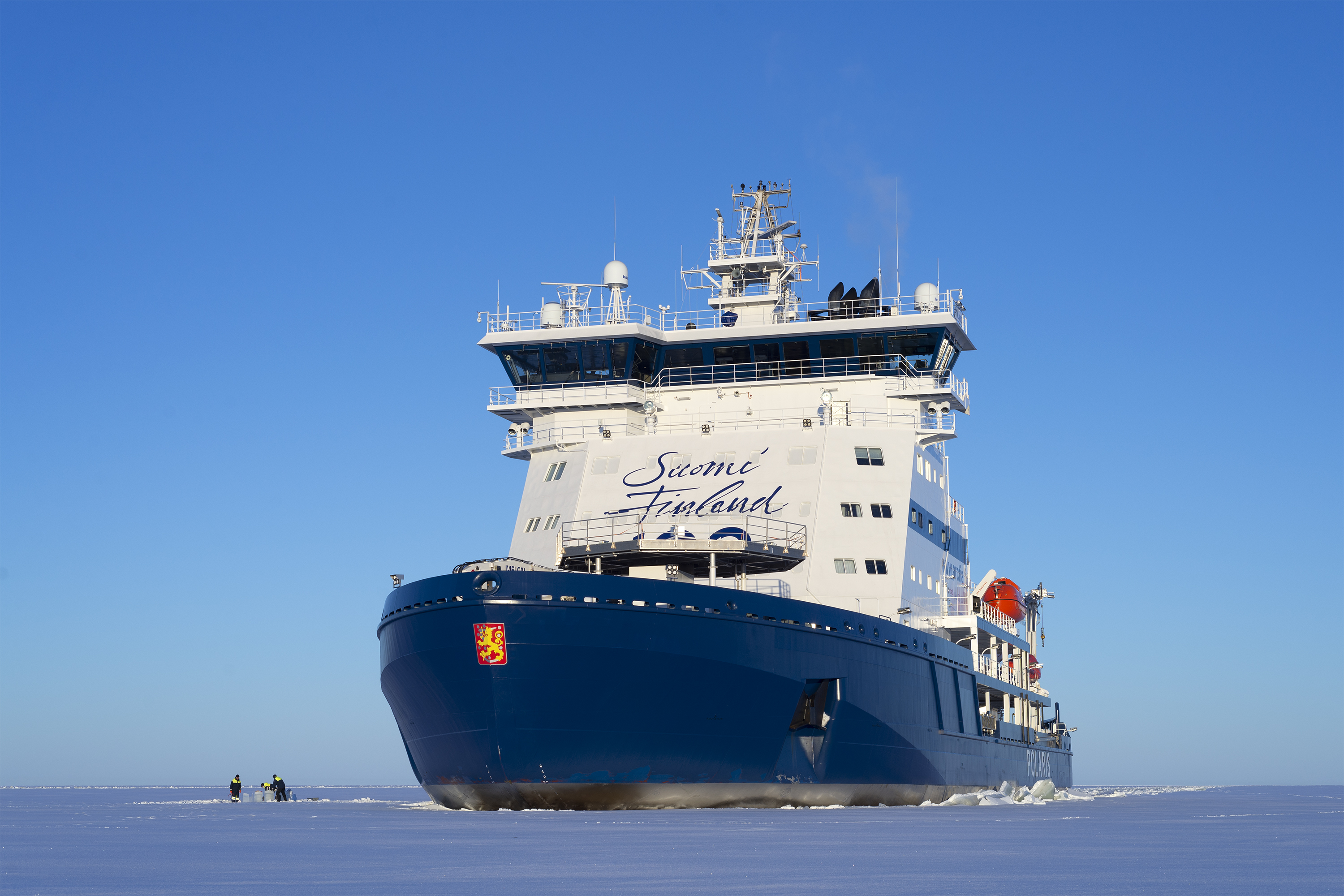
- Polaris on full-scale ice trials in the Gulf of Bothnia on 24 March 2017

History

Finland
- Name: Polaris
- Namesake: Polaris
- Owner: Finnish Transport Agency (initial owner); Arctia Icebreaking (after delivery)
- Port of registry: Helsinki, Finland
- Ordered: 14 February 2014
- Builder: Arctech Helsinki Shipyard, Finland
- Cost: €125 million
- Yard number: 510
- Laid down: 4 March 2015
- Launched: 3 January 2016
- Sponsored by: Paula Risikko
- Completed: 28 September 2016
- Identification: IMO number: 9734161; Call sign: OJQT; MMSI number: 230661000
- Status: In service

General characteristics
- Type: Icebreaker
- Tonnage: 9,333 GT
- Displacement: 10,961 t (10,788 long tons)
- Length: 110 m (360 ft)
- Beam: 24 m (79 ft)
- Draft: 8 m (26 ft) (design); 9 m (30 ft) (max)
- Ice class: Polar Class 4 Icebreaker(+)
- Installed power: 2 × Wärtsilä 9L34DF (2 × 4,500 kW); 2 × Wärtsilä 12V34DF (2 × 6,000 kW); 1 × Wärtsilä 8L20DF (1,408 kW)
- Propulsion: Diesel-electric; three ABB Azipod units; 1 × 6 MW (bow); 2 × 6.5 MW (stern)
- Speed: 17 knots (31 km/h; 20 mph) (open water); 3.5 knots (6.5 km/h; 4.0 mph) in 1.8 m (6 ft) ice
- Endurance: 10 days on LNG; 20 days on marine diesel oil
- Crew: 16

Polaris is a Finnish icebreaker. Built in 2016 by Arctech Helsinki Shipyard, she is the most powerful icebreaker ever to fly the Finnish flag and the first icebreaker in the world to feature dual-fuel engines capable of using both low-sulfur marine diesel oil (LSMDO) and liquefied natural gas (LNG). Polaris was initially ordered by the Finnish Transport Agency, but the ownership was transferred to the state-owned icebreaker operator Arctia after delivery.

== Background ==
While the history of winter navigation in Finland dates back to the strengthened sleigh-boats used to carry mail from Finland to Sweden in the 17th century, the annual "ice blockade" that closed the Finnish ports for the winter months and stopped nearly all foreign trade was not broken until 1890 when the Finnish Board of Navigation commissioned one of the first purpose-built icebreakers in the world. Despite her shortcomings, Murtaja proved that year-round shipping was possible in the Baltic Sea and the first Finnish icebreaker was soon followed by bigger and more powerful vessels with only one purpose: to keep the shipping lanes open and escort merchant ships to and from the Finnish ports through the winter. In the late 1930s, steam gave way to diesel when the first Finnish diesel-electric icebreaker, Sisu, entered service in 1939.

While all Finnish state-owned icebreakers survived the Winter War and Continuation War against the Soviet Union, Finland had to hand over its newest and most powerful steam-powered icebreakers to the Soviet Union as war reparations. The rebuilding of the icebreaker fleet began in the early 1950s with the commissioning of the diesel-electric Voima, the first icebreaker in the world to feature two bow propellers, in 1954. She was followed by two more icebreakers before the end of the decade to replace the steam-powered pre-war icebreakers now deemed obsolete, four in the 1960s to answer to the demands of the growing foreign trade, and finally three in the 1970s to keep all Finnish ports open through the winter.

In the early 1980s, the Finnish National Board of Navigation began looking for a replacement for the three 1950s icebreakers which were small and, despite their size, expensive to operate as they required a relatively large crew of 53. They were replaced by two large icebreakers, Otso and Kontio, featuring extensive automation, alternating current propulsion motors with cycloconverter drive, and a sleek hull form perfected in a model basin, but for the first time since the late 1800s no bow propellers. Around the same time, the 'National Board of Navigation' also began looking for secondary uses for the icebreakers which were traditionally employed only for three to five months per year and spent the summer months moored at Katajanokka in Helsinki. When the next class of post-war icebreakers was approaching the end of its economic life, it was decided to replace them with multipurpose vessels that could be chartered to support commercial offshore operations in oil fields when they were not needed in the Finnish waters. Three such multipurpose icebreakers were built in the 1990s: Fennica (1993), Nordica (1994), and Botnica (1998). The vessels, which were the first large icebreakers to use azimuth thrusters for propulsion, were sometimes criticized for their lower icebreaking performance and higher operational costs when compared to traditional icebreakers. Botnica, which had not been used for icebreaking in Finland for some years, was sold to Estonia in 2012.

Although the topic of ordering a new icebreaker surfaced from time to time, funding for the vessel projected to cost 100 to 120 million euro was not included in the budget until 2012 when 125 million euro was allocated for a new vessel with a design lifetime of 50 years. Of this, 25 million euro would come from the Trans-European Transport Networks (TEN-T) program of the European Union. Initially, the new icebreaker was supposed to replace the 1954-built Voima, the oldest and smallest icebreaker in the Finnish state-owned fleet as well as technically the oldest icebreaker in the world still in active service. When the new icebreaker was ordered, it was stated that the new vessel would primarily replace the Atle-class icebreaker Frej that the Finnish government has chartered from Sweden while Voima would remain in limited service.

== Development and construction ==
The technical requirements were outlined in a tender specification published by the Finnish Transport Agency on 11 February 2013. According to the specification, the new icebreaker would have to be at least equivalent to the most powerful Finnish icebreakers in service at the time – the 16.2-megawatt quad-screw Urho-class icebreakers — in terms of icebreaking capability. Optimized for escort icebreaker operations in the northern Baltic Sea, the vessel would have to be powerful enough to operate without becoming immobilized in all prevailing ice conditions, including compressive pressure ridge fields, and maintain an average escort speed of 9 to 11 knots (17 to 20 km/h; 10 to 13 mph) through the winter. The bollard pull and propulsion power would have to be sufficient to allow continuous operation in level ice with a thickness of 1.5 metres (5 ft) and 10–20-centimetre (4–8 in) snow cover as well as make the vessel capable of opening a 25-metre (82 ft) channel through uniform 1.2 metres (4 ft) ice field at a speed of 6 knots (11 km/h; 6.9 mph). The specification also called for excellent maneuverability, demonstrated by the ability to turn 180 degrees in 3 minutes within two ship's lengths in the aforementioned ice conditions.

Although designed primarily for icebreaking, the new Finnish icebreaker would have a secondary task as an oil spill response vessel during the summer months as a response to the increasing traffic and oil transportation in the Baltic Sea. For this purpose, the vessel would be fitted with equipment for mechanical recovery of spilled oil in both open water and ice conditions. Since icebreakers traditionally have poor seakeeping characteristics due to their rounded hull form, the technical specification stressed the vessel's ability to carry out oil spill response and emergency towing operations in 95% of the prevailing wind and wave conditions in the Baltic Sea.

On 16 April 2013, the Finnish Transport Agency awarded the contract for the design of the new icebreaker to two Finnish engineering companies specializing in the design of icebreaking ships. The vessel would be designed by Aker Arctic Technology Inc in co-operation with ILS Oy. In addition to conceptual design, which included comparing two concept alternatives – a conventional icebreaker with two azimuth thrusters and a new concept with three propulsion units – in terms of performance and cost, the companies would prepare the technical material needed to arrange the tender for the construction of the vessel and assist the Finnish Transport Agency in negotiations with shipyards. Aker Arctic would also carry out model tests in the company's ice tank to verify the performance of the new icebreaker. The shipyard to build the 125 million euro icebreaker would be selected later in that year after an international bidding process.

On 20 June 2013, the Finnish Transport Agency published a request for tender for the construction of the new icebreaker with an intention of creating a shortlist of three to five shipyards that would be invited to the final call for bids later in the autumn. Only shipyards that had built at least one ship capable of operating independently in ice within the past three years could qualify for the bidding process, limiting the selection to just a handful of shipyards, such as STX Finland and Arctech Helsinki Shipyard in Finland, Nordic Yards Wismar in Germany and VARD in Norway, where such vessels have been built in the 2010s. The tendering documents also included additional information about the technical features of the new vessel, such as the ability to use liquefied natural gas as fuel and a new kind of propulsion system consisting of three azimuth thrusters, one of which would be placed in the bow of the vessel.

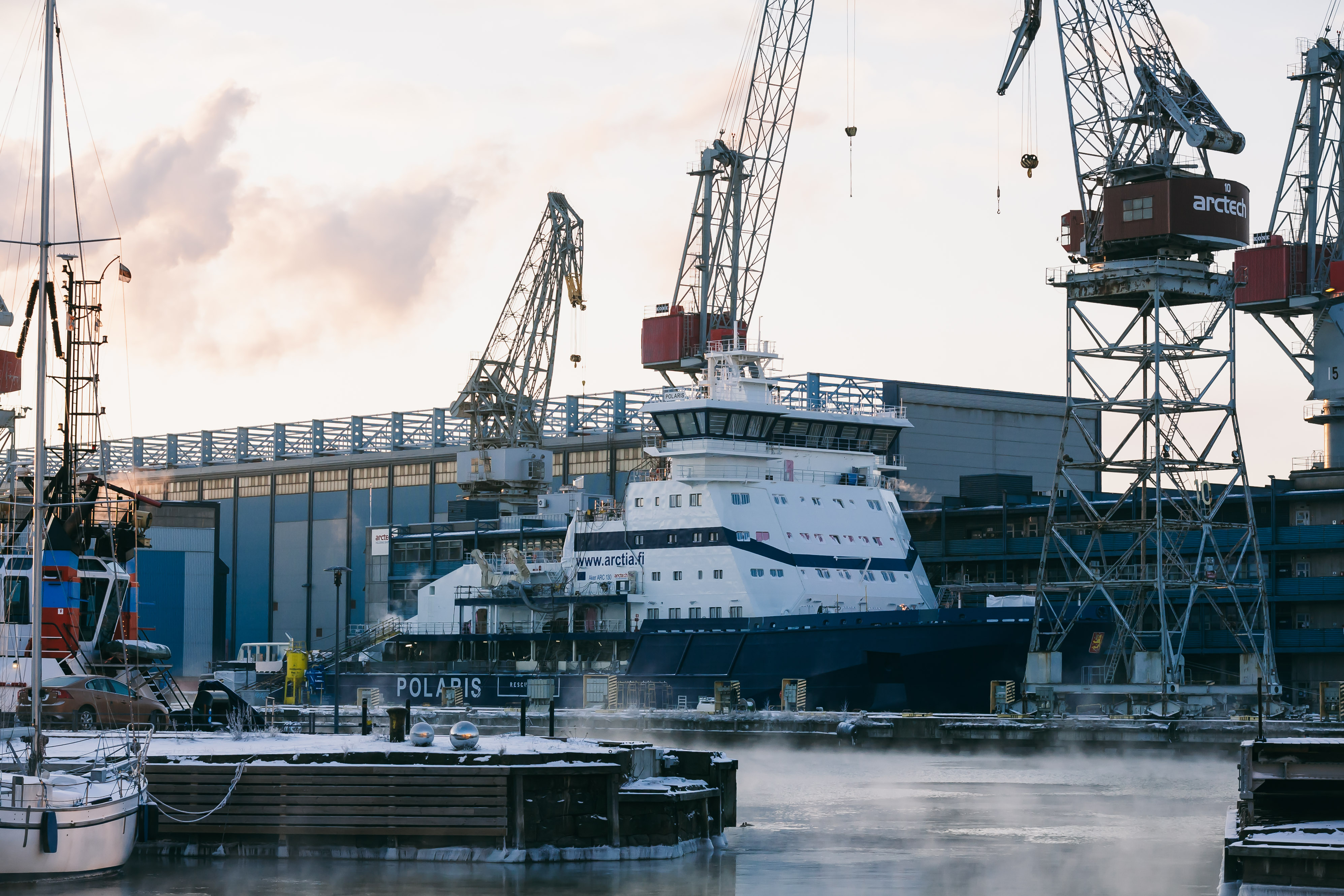
Polaris under construction at Arctech Helsinki Shipyard.

On 27 November 2013, the construction of the new Finnish icebreaker was awarded to Arctech Helsinki Shipyard and the Finnish Transport Agency intended to sign the shipbuilding contract before the year's end. The only other shipbuilding company that submitted a bid, STX Finland, was disqualified after the shipyard failed to present sufficient guaranties. However, on 29 November the Finnish Transport Agency cancelled the contract, citing issues with guaranties offered by the shipyard, and was forced to re-open the bidding to other shipyards. On 22 January 2014, Arctech Helsinki Shipyard won the second round of the tendering process and the final contract was signed on 14 February.

In August 2014, the Finnish Transport Agency announced a naming contest for the new icebreaker. According to the instructions, the name should preferably be a two-syllable word that would be easy to pronounce also in English. In addition, if a person's name was proposed, it should traditionally be a man's name. The winner would be invited to the launching ceremony where the name of the vessel will be published. On 11 December 2015, the new icebreaker was given the name Polaris which refers to the North Star, an important navigational star for seafarers on northern seas, as well as the ice class of the vessel.

The first steel for the new icebreaker was cut during the autumn 2014. Since the Helsinki shipyard no longer has independent block production capability, the steel production is outsourced to Klaipėda, Lithuania. The keel-laying ceremony, which marks the beginning of hull assembly, was held on 4 March 2015, on the 150th anniversary of the Hietalahti shipyard. By September 2015, the hull assembly was nearly complete. On 3 January 2016, Polaris was floated out from the covered dry dock and moved to the outfitting quay. While the original delivery date in the construction agreement was 11 January 2016, the construction of Polaris was slightly behind schedule due to the sanctions against the Russian-owned Arctech Helsinki Shipyard which affected funding and procurement of equipment. On 28 September 2016, Polaris was delivered to the Finnish Transport Agency, who then handed the icebreaker over to Arctia.

On 24 February 2015, the new Finnish icebreaker was awarded the runner-up in the ASF Arctic Shipping Innovation Award of 2015 in the 11th annual Arctic Shipping Forum for its innovative propulsion system and dual-fuel power plant. She was also ranked third in "The Top 10 Ships of 2016" by Maritime Reporter & Engineering News.

== Career ==
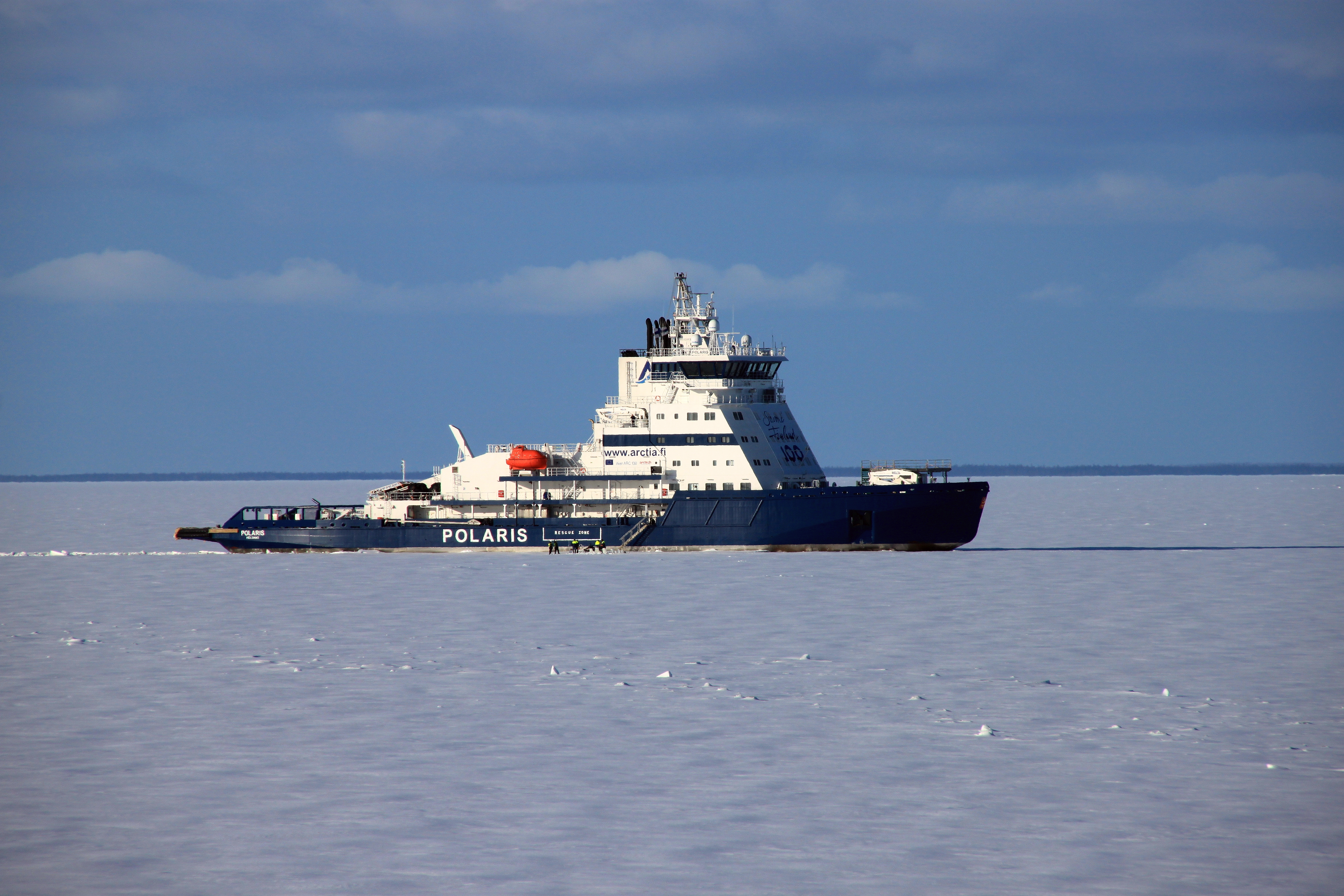
Polaris off Kemi on 23 March 2017

Polaris began her first icebreaking season in January 2017 after having been on standby since the beginning of November. After leaving Helsinki on 9 January, the vessel stopped at Pori on the western coast of Finland for additional food provisions and 700 cubic metres of liquefied natural gas before heading to the Bothnian Bay to escort merchant ships to and from Finnish ports. When interviewed in February 2017, the crew praised the high maneuverability of the new vessel during icebreaking operations. Polaris ended her first icebreaking season in May and headed to Rauma Marine Constructions shipyard in Rauma, Finland and later Turku Repair Yard in Turku, for warranty-related drydockings. She returned to the icebreaker base in Helsinki on 12 June.

== Controversies ==
Until the 1990s, the Finnish state-owned icebreaker fleet was operational only for three to five months per year and the icebreakers, designed solely for escorting merchant ships in ice-infested waters, spent the summer months moored at Katajanokka in Helsinki. In the mid-1980s, the Finnish National Board of Navigation launched a project to find secondary uses for the new vessels it was planning to build as a replacement for some of the oldest icebreakers. A multipurpose application of the new icebreakers would result in a better use of the vessels and, assuming they were chartered by a commercial third party during the summer, improve the overall economics of the state-owned fleet. As a result, three multipurpose icebreakers were built in Finland in the 1990s: Fennica (1993), Nordica (1994) and Botnica (1998). Over the years, the multipurpose icebreakers have been heavily criticized for the financial losses from the offshore business, where they were not competitive against purpose-built platform supply vessels, as well as lower icebreaking capability when compared to traditional icebreakers from the 1970s and 1980s.

When the funding for the construction of the new icebreaker was accepted in the state budget proposal in 2012, there was a public debate about the type of the future Finnish icebreakers. Arctia, the state-owned shipping company that owns and operates the Finnish icebreaker fleet, called for a multi-role vessel that could be employed year-round instead of just the winter navigation season. Previously, the company had chartered Fennica and Nordica to support Shell Oil's exploration drilling operations in the Arctic waters off Alaska and was looking for more profitable business outside the Baltic Sea during the summer months. However, the Finnish Minister of Transport Merja Kyllönen (Left Alliance) voiced her opposition to a ship that would be 50% more expensive to build than a traditional icebreaker. Other politicians also opposed the idea and Osmo Soininvaara (Green League) even proposed that instead of purchasing a new icebreaker to replace Voima, Finland should try to manage with a smaller icebreaker fleet and accept that some ports would likely be closed during the coldest winters.

In October 2013, the Minister for International Development to the Finnish government, Heidi Hautala (Green League), was accused for influencing Minister Kyllönen's decision to order a conventional single-role icebreaker for the Finnish Transport Agency instead of a multipurpose vessel for Arctia. According to the Finnish newspaper Ilta-Sanomat, these decisions were made to guarantee that the new icebreaker, which would now be employed only for about 100 days per year, would not head out to the Arctic waters. As the minister responsible for ownership steering in the Prime Minister's Office, Hautala had also instructed Arctia to withdraw criminal charges against Greenpeace whose activists had boarded the Finnish multipurpose icebreakers in 2012 as a protest against Arctic oil drilling. After providing conflicting accounts of the incident, Minister Hautala announced her resignation on 11 October 2013.

While the existing Finnish icebreaker fleet was owned and operated solely by Arctia, the new icebreaker was initially intended to be owned by the Finnish Transport Agency and the operator would be selected through public tendering process. The new model was adopted from Sweden where the operation of state-owned icebreakers has been open for competition for years. Arctia, which practically has a monopoly in the icebreaker business in Finland, has been criticized for higher prices when compared to Swedish icebreakers as well as potentially subsidizing unprofitable offshore operations by charging premium charter from the Finnish Transport Agency for the multipurpose vessels. In October 2014, the newly appointed Finnish Minister of Transport Paula Risikko (National Coalition Party) questioned her predecessors' decision to order the icebreaker for an expert organization operating under the jurisdiction of the Ministry of Transport and Communications instead of the state-owned shipping company which was established to own and manage the Finnish state-owned icebreaker fleet. In November 2014, the Ministry of Transport and Communications proposed the Finnish Transport Agency that the new icebreaker should be sold to Arctia. On 5 March 2015, it was officially announced that the Finnish Government had agreed to sell the new icebreaker to Arctia Icebreaking, a subsidiary of Arctia, for 128 million euro. Although the contract was officially signed on 20 April 2015, the ownership will be transferred when the vessel has been delivered in 2016. According to the contract, the shipping company is obliged to have the new icebreaker available for tendering procedures for Baltic Sea icebreaking services until the end of 2020.

On 25 November 2014, the Cabinet Committee on Economic Policy published a statement regarding the future of the state-owned shipping company, Arctia, and its fleet of aging icebreakers. According to the statement, the company's existing conventional and multipurpose icebreakers would require replacement by 2029 at an overall cost of about 1 billion euro. To keep the cost of icebreaking services in the Baltic Sea at a reasonable level, the shipping company should improve the annual use rate of its icebreakers by investing in multi-role vessels that could be improved elsewhere during the summer months. While more expensive to build, such multipurpose icebreakers would result in savings ranging from 20 to 30 million euro over the 30-year lifetime of the vessel. Generally, this statement was seen as a major change in government policy regarding the use of Finnish icebreakers to support potentially controversial operations such as oil exploration in the Arctic.

== Technical details ==
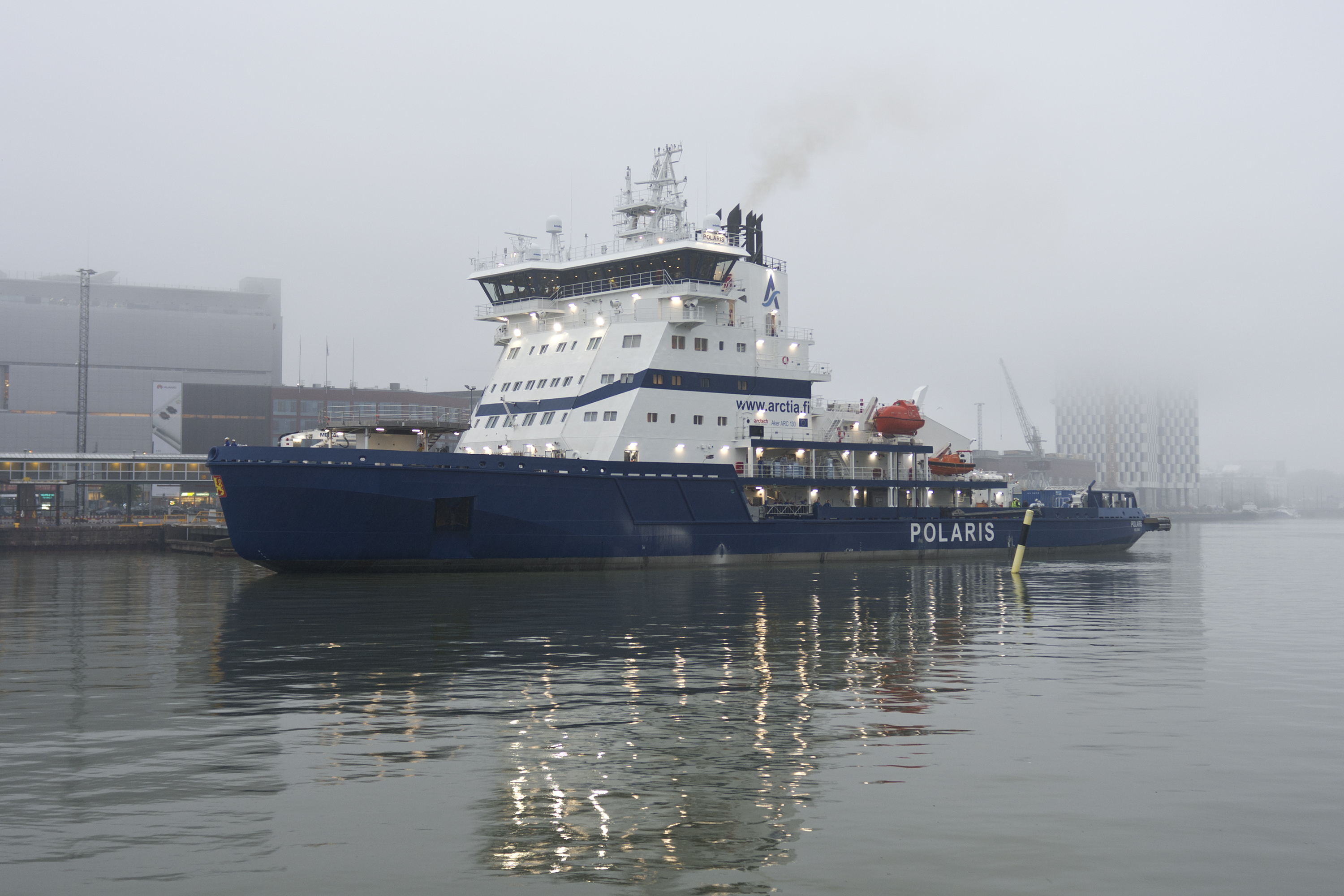
Polaris leaving for second sea trials on 16 June 2016 with the original coloring scheme.

=== General characteristics ===
Polaris is based on the Aker ARC 130 concept developed by Aker Arctic and ILS. With an overall length of 110 metres (360 ft) and beam of 24 metres (79 ft), she is roughly equivalent in size to the older Urho-class and Otso-class icebreakers, but has a somewhat greater displacement of 10,961 tonnes. Her design draft, 8 metres (26 ft), allows the vessel to operate on all major Finnish shipping lanes. The highly automated icebreaker operates with a crew of 16, but has accommodation for eight supernumeraries. Like the multipurpose icebreakers built in the 1990s, Polaris has an asymmetric bridge to maximize visibility to all directions from the main steering position on the starboard side. The propulsion units can be steered individually using three joystick-like controllers instead of a traditional wheel and telegraph.

After satellite imaging replaced helicopters as the primary means to get up-to-date information about ice conditions in the Baltic Sea, the helicopter facilities in the older Finnish icebreakers have become largely obsolete. For this reason, the Polaris has only a small winching area in the bow. However, the platform is dimensioned so that it is still possible to land a helicopter on it in case of emergency.

Polaris is classified by Lloyd's Register. Although the icebreaker is stationed in the Baltic Sea where there is only seasonal ice cover, she is designed according to the International Association of Classification Societies (IACS) Unified Requirements for Polar Class Ships. Her ice class, Polar Class 4, is intended for vessels operating year-round in thick first-year ice which may include old ice inclusions. However, since the vessel also has a class notation Icebreaker(+) and operates as an escort icebreaker in difficult ice conditions, she has additional structural strengthening in critical areas. Like all Finnish icebreakers since the 1980s, Polaris also features an unpainted stainless steel ice belt to reduce friction and protect the hull against ice abrasion and corrosion.

While Polaris is designed primarily for icebreaking duties, she has a secondary role as an oil spill response vessel. The new icebreaker is fitted with equipment for mechanical recovery of spilled oil from the sea in both open water and ice conditions. The permanently installed advancing system and the stern-mounted brush skimmers are similar to the recovery systems fitted on latest Finnish oil spill response vessels such as the 2011-built pollution control vessel Louhi and 2014-built offshore patrol vessel Turva. The recovery tanks have a total capacity of 1,300 cubic metres (46,000 cu ft).

The coloring scheme follows that of the other Finnish icebreakers, with dark blue hull and white superstructure with blue details. The underwater parts, including the propulsion units, are painted white. In 2017, the fore bulkhead was adorned with "Finland 100" logo to celebrate Finland's 100 years of independence.

=== Power and propulsion ===
Like all Finnish post-war icebreakers, Polaris has a diesel-electric power plant and propulsion system. However, she is the first icebreaker in the world to be powered by dual-fuel engines capable of using both low-sulfur marine diesel oil (LSMDO) as well as liquefied natural gas (LNG) as fuel. The dual-fuel power plant reduces exhaust emissions and complies with both IMO Tier III emission limits as well as the special requirements of the Baltic Sea Sulphur Emission Control Area (SECA). In average winter conditions, the vessel has an autonomy time of 10 days when operating on liquefied natural gas, which is stored in two vertical tanks with a total volume of 800 cubic metres (28,000 cu ft). Fuel oil, stored in separate tanks with a combined volume of 2,500 cubic metres (88,000 cu ft), provides additional 20 days of endurance in similar ice conditions.

The power plant, located amidships at the main deck level, consists of two 9-cylinder Wärtsilä 9L34DF and two 12-cylinder Wärtsilä 12V34DF four-stroke medium-speed dual-fuel generating sets fitted with exhaust gas economizers. The smaller straight engines are rated at 4,500 kW (6,000 hp) each while the bigger Vee engines have an output of 6,000 kW (8,000 hp) each. In addition, the vessel has one 8-cylinder Wärtsilä 8L20DF auxiliary engine, rated at 1,408 kW (1,888 hp), that can be used to produce electricity when the ship is at port. The combined output of the electrical power plant, which can produce power for all shipboard consumers with any combination of generating sets depending on the power demand, is about 22.5 MW. There is also a separate emergency diesel generator.

Polaris features a novel propulsion system consisting of three electrically driven ABB Azipod propulsion units, one of which is located in the bow of the vessel. The stern propulsion units are rated at 6.5 megawatts each while the azimuth thruster in the bow has propulsion power of 6 megawatts. Each ice-strengthened Azipod unit has a four-bladed stainless steel propeller with removable blades and weighs 135 tons. This new type of propulsion system was selected to fulfill the strict operational capability requirements set by the Finnish Transport Agency particularly in ridged ice fields. The combined propulsion power of the three propulsion units, 19 megawatts (25,000 hp), makes Polaris the most powerful icebreaker ever to fly the Finnish flag as well as the most powerful icebreaker built specifically for escort operations in the Baltic Sea.

Based on ice model tests carried out before the vessel is delivered, Polaris is capable of continuously breaking level ice with a thickness of 1.8 metres (6 ft) at 3.5 knots (6.5 km/h; 4.0 mph) and maintain a speed of 9.2 knots (17.0 km/h; 10.6 mph) in 0.87-metre (3 ft) unbroken ice. While the ice in the northern parts of the Gulf of Bothnia does not get thicker than about 1 metre (3 ft) even during the hardest winters, the high icebreaking capability allows the vessel to operate efficiently in all prevailing ice conditions, particularly heavily ridged ice fields, and maintain a high average escort speed through the winter. In open water, the vessel has a trial speed of 17 knots (31 km/h; 20 mph).

The icebreaker, which has a bollard pull of about 214 metric tons, can also be used for emergency towing of stricken vessels.
