= MSV Fennica =

Finnish multipurpose icebreaker

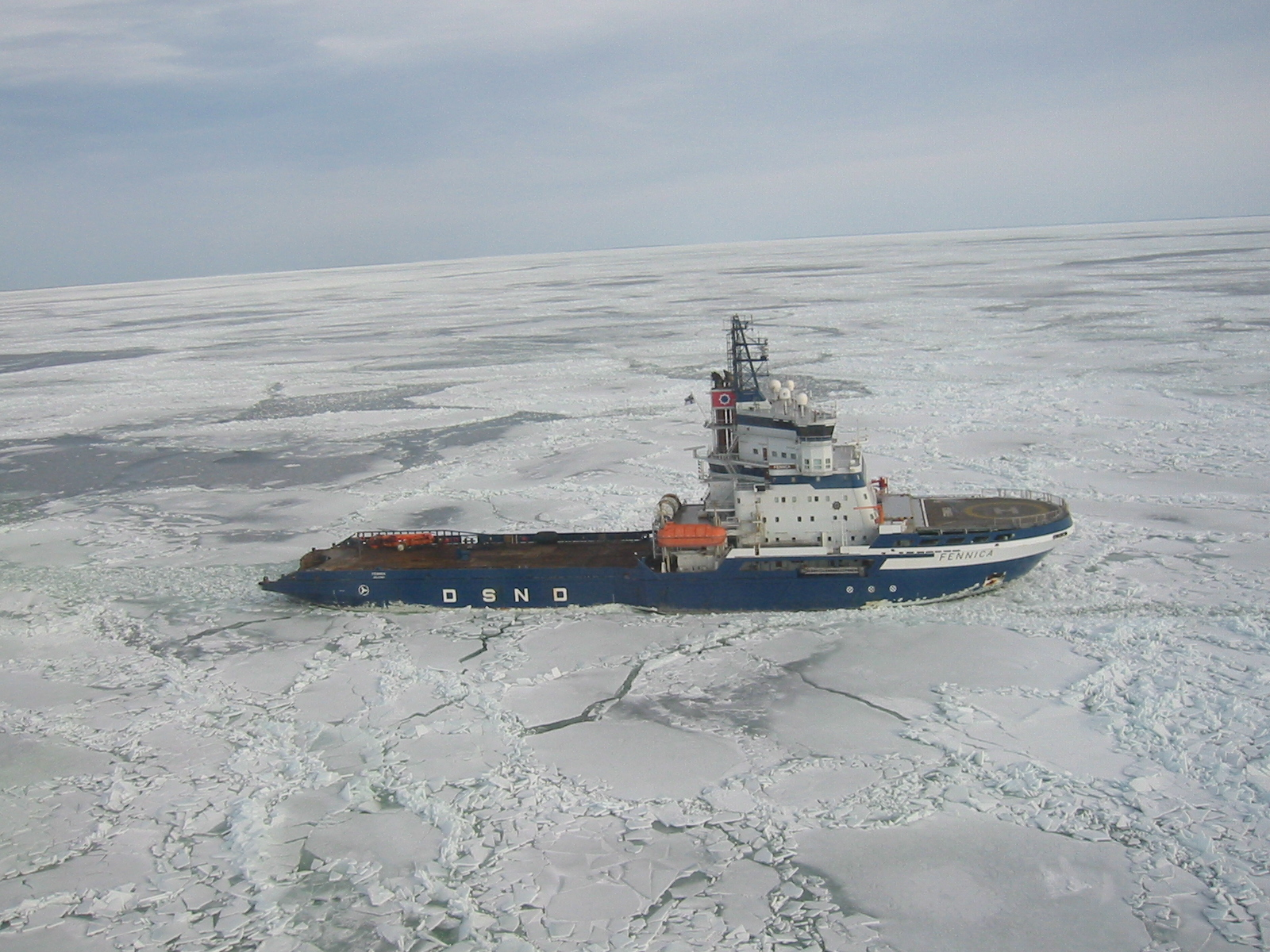
- Icebreaker Fennica

History

Finland
- Name: Fennica
- Owner: Finnish Maritime Administration (Note: Finnish National Board of Navigation until 1998.) (1993–2004); Finstaship (2004–2010); Arctia Offshore (2010–)
- Port of registry: Helsinki, Finland
- Ordered: October 1991
- Builder: Finnyards Ltd., Rauma, Finland
- Yard number: 401
- Laid down: 21 April 1992
- Launched: 10 September 1992
- Completed: 1 March 1993
- Identification: Call sign: OJAD; IMO number: 9043615
- Status: In service

General characteristics
- Type: Icebreaker/ Offshore support vessel
- Tonnage: 9,392 GT; 2,818 NT; 1,650 to 4,800 DWT
- Length: 116 m (381 ft)
- Beam: 26 m (85 ft)
- Draft: 7–8.4 m (23–28 ft)
- Depth: 12.5 m (41 ft)
- Ice class: DNV POLAR-10 Icebreaker; Polar Class 3 (2019–)
- Installed power: 2 × Wärtsilä 16V32D (2 × 6,000 kW); 2 × Wärtsilä 12V32D (2 × 4,500 kW)
- Propulsion: Diesel-electric (AC/AC); Two Aquamaster US ARC 1 azimuth thrusters (2 × 7,500 kW); Three Brunvoll bow thrusters (3 × 1,150 kW)
- Speed: 16.5 knots (30.6 km/h; 19.0 mph) (max); 11–13 knots (20–24 km/h; 13–15 mph) (service); 9.5 knots (17.6 km/h; 10.9 mph) in 80 cm (31 in) ice
- Crew: Accommodation for 77 personnel
- Aviation facilities: Helipad

MSV Fennica is a Finnish multipurpose icebreaker and offshore support vessel. Built in 1993 by Finnyards in Rauma, Finland and operated by Arctia Offshore, she was the first Finnish icebreaker designed to be used as an escort icebreaker in the Baltic Sea during the winter months and in offshore construction projects during the open water season. Fennica has an identical sister ship, Nordica, built in 1994.

== Design ==
=== General characteristics ===
The maximum overall length of Fennica is 116 metres (380.6 ft) and her length between perpendiculars is 96.7 metres (317.3 ft). The hull has a moulded breadth of 26 metres (85.3 ft) and depth of 12.5 metres (41.0 ft). Her draught varies between 7 metres (23.0 ft) as a Baltic icebreaker and 8.4 metres (27.6 ft) in Arctic conditions and offshore work. The gross tonnage of Fennica is 9,392, net tonnage 2,818 and deadweight tonnage ranging between 1,650 and 4,800 tons depending on the draft. The ship weighs 7,935 tons and has a maximum displacement of 12,800 tons.

Fennica is classified by Det Norske Veritas with a class notation 1A1 POLAR-10 Icebreaker Tug Supply Vessel SF HELDK EPR E0 DYNPOS-AUTR. Her ice class, POLAR-10, means that her hull is strengthened for unassisted operation in the Arctic, sub-Arctic and Antarctic regions, where the vessel can encounter winter ice with a nominal thickness of 1 metre (3.3 ft), pressure ridges, multi-year ice floes and glacial ice inclusions. The additional class notation "Icebreaker" states that she has no limitations for repeated ramming. To improve the maneuverability of the ship in ice her hull is wider at the bow than in the stern. These "reamers" increase the width of the ice channel and reduce friction between the hull and ice. The reamers are designed so that they create minimum additional resistance in the astern mode by breaking ice downwards. In addition the forward part of the hull has explosion-welded stainless steel ice belt that reduces friction and protects the steel plates from abrasion.

The aforementioned design with the maximum breadth in the foreship and a narrower hull aftship, provides the multipurpose vessel also good seakeeping characteristics. Traditionally icebreakers have had, due to their broad beam and relatively shallow hull, a very short roll period in waves, which makes working on board the vessel extremely difficult due to its violent motions. In the design phase of the vessel, the seakeeping characteristics of the multipurpose icebreaker were defined to be at least as good as those of existing offshore vessels in the North Sea. The offshore operator set a requirement of acceptable acceleration figures at various locations of the vessel at zero speed. The vessel had to be able to operate at least 80 % of the time in the North Sea in the summer and autumn season plus have a roll period longer than 10 seconds. The solution with narrow breadth in the aftship results in a sufficiently long roll period. At the midship and aft ship area there are also exceptionally wide bilge shelves as an integral part of the hull, to further dampen the rolling. Moreover, the vessel is equipped with a U-shaped semi-active anti-rolling tank across the widest point of the bow section. The good seakeeping characteristics are an asset also in Arctic operations and long transit distances.

For offshore construction projects Fennica is equipped with a Hydralift crane capable of lifting 30 tons at a radius of 11 metres (36 ft) or 15 tons at 20 metres (66 ft). She also has a smaller MacGregor crane capable of lifting 5 tons at 14 metres (46 ft) or 1.5 tons at 30 metres (98 ft). The vessel can also be equipped with a 120-ton A-frame for trenching machines and ploughs. Fennica has a helipad and can accommodate 48 workers in addition to the ship's crew. Before her helipad was rebuilt in 2012, she also had a small hangar capable of accommodating one helicopter for ice reconnaissance. Since Fennica acts as an escort icebreaker during the winter season, she is also equipped with a Aquamaster-Rauma anchor handling and towing winch, and stern notch for assisting merchant ships. The oblique bridge maximizes visibility from the starboard side steering position.

=== Power and propulsion ===
Fennica has a diesel-electric propulsion system with four main generators. She has two twelve-cylinder Wärtsilä Vasa 12V32D and two sixteen-cylinder 16V32D four-stroke medium-speed diesel engines driving Strömberg alternators, the former producing 4,500 kW (6,000 hp) and the latter 6,000 kW (8,000 hp) each. The main engines are also equipped with exhaust gas economizers. In late 2011 they were also retrofitted with catalytic converters and urea spraying systems to reduce NO_{x} emissions in order to meet the strict EPA requirements. While designed according to the power plant principle in which the main generators produce power for all shipboard consumers either directly or through a motor-generator, Fennica has one auxiliary diesel generator that can be used to produce electricity when the ship is at port. The four-cylinder Wärtsilä Vasa 4R22 4-stroke medium-speed diesel engine has an output of 710 kW (950 hp) at 1,000 rpm. In addition she has a twelve-cylinder Caterpillar 3412 DISA emergency diesel generator with an output of 300 kW (400 hp) at 1,500 rpm.

While underway, the fuel consumption of the main engines is 42 tons of heavy fuel oil or diesel per day at 13 knots (24 km/h; 15 mph) or 30 tons per day at 11 knots (20 km/h; 13 mph), giving the vessel an operating time of 45 to 67 days depending on the speed. During dynamic positioning operations the fuel consumption is 15 tons per day and the operating time depends on the distance and speed of transit to location. In late 2011 the fuel system was converted for the use of ultra-low-sulfur diesel.

Fennica is propelled by two Aquamaster US ARC 1 Z-drive azimuth thrusters with 4.2-metre (14 ft) ducted fixed-pitch stainless steel propellers. The 177-ton thrusters, driven by ABB Strömberg AC/AC propulsion motors rated at 7,500 kW, considerably improve the maneuverability of the icebreaker. This is especially useful during escort and assistance operations in difficult ice conditions when the icebreaker has to operate at close proximity to other vessels at low speeds. When delivered, she was the first large icebreaker to be equipped with such propulsion system and her maneuverability was often described to be superior to older icebreakers with traditional shaftlines and rudders. Together with three 1,150 kW Brunvoll FU-80 LTC-2250 variable-pitch bow thrusters the azimuth thrusters also allow dynamic positioning during offshore operations.

The maximum speed of Fennica is 16.5 knots (30.6 km/h; 19.0 mph) in open water. She can maintain a speed of 9.5 knots (17.6 km/h; 10.9 mph) on 80 centimetres (31 in) level ice and operate in continuous motion in level ice up to 1.8 metres (5.9 ft) thick. Her bollard pull is 230 tons. At the time of her delivery, Fennica was the most powerful offshore support vessel in the world.

== History ==
=== Development and construction ===
The development of the Finnish multipurpose icebreakers began in the mid-1980s when the Finnish National Board of Navigation launched a project to find secondary uses for the new vessels it was planning to build as a replacement for some of the oldest icebreakers. Until then the Finnish icebreakers had been designed solely for escort operations in ice-infested waters and their specialized hull form was not suitable for open water. As a result, the existing icebreakers had an effective operational time of only three to five months per year and spent the summer season moored at Katajanokka in Helsinki. A multipurpose application of the new icebreakers would thus result in a better utilization of the vessels and, assuming they were chartered by a commercial third party during the summer, improve the economics of the state-owned fleet.

However, the concept did not become reality until the early 1990s, when the Norwegian company Ugland Offshore AS (later DSND Offshore AS) became involved in the project to develop and construct multipurpose icebreakers that could be used for offshore operations in the oil fields during the summer months. The concept was developed by the Board of Navigation together with a Finnish consulting engineering company ILS. The summer period operational profile of the vessel was defined by the offshore markets' needs. Most of all, there was a demand for vessels that could conduct flexible pipe and cable laying and trenching and ploughing of cables and pipelines. Other defined tasks were e.g. cable repair work, anchor handling and the moving of offshore oil drilling platforms, semi-submersible units, and other offshore units, and transportation of deck cargo. The operational area was defined as worldwide service concentrating to the Northern and Arctic areas.

An extensive series of both seakeeping and ice model tests was performed during the design phase of the vessel. Open water model testing was performed in VTT Technical Research Centre of Finland's tank, and the results indicated that the vessel would be able to operate at least 90% of the time in the North Sea in the summer and autumn seasons, and able to keep the speed of 15 knots (28 km/h; 17 mph) in the area's head seas, also 90% of the same seasons. Comparative tests were run with a conventional large supply ship model, and they showed that the new icebreaker hull design would function better than a typical large supply ship in normal operating conditions.

The novel hull form was tested and adjusted in an extensive ice model test series at VTT's ship laboratory. The testing concentrated also especially on maneuvering characteristics. Later the full scale ice trials were conducted in March 1993 in Northern Baltic off the cities of Oulu and Kemi, and they proved that the design criteria was achieved in icebreaking and ridge penetration capability ahead and astern, whereas the assistance and maneuvering capability in ice exceeded expectations.

The contract for the construction of the first vessel with an option for a sister ship was signed with Finnyards in October 1991. The second vessel was ordered in June 1992. The first Finnish multipurpose icebreaker, Fennica, was delivered in 1993 and her sister ship, Nordica, in the following year. The new vessels replaced the aging four-screw icebreakers Tarmo and Varma which were sold to Estonia and Latvia, respectively.

In 1997 a third multipurpose icebreaker was ordered from Finnyards. The ship, delivered in 1998 as Botnica, was slightly smaller than the previous Finnish multipurpose icebreakers and had several other differences, such as twelve Caterpillar high-speed diesel engines instead of medium-speed units and Azipod electric azimuth thrusters instead of the ducted Z-drive Aquamasters. In 2012, Botnica was sold to Port of Tallinn, Estonia.

=== Career ===
When Fennica entered service in 1993, it was agreed that the multipurpose icebreakers would be chartered for offshore duties about 180 days per year during the ice-free season. For the winter months, they would return to Finland for escort icebreaking duties in the Baltic Sea or, if there was no need to deploy the whole state-owned icebreaker fleet during particularly mild winters, for lay-up in a Finnish port. The exclusive right to charter the multipurpose icebreakers was given to Ugland Offshore AS and later DSND Offshore AS. In 2002, Halliburton Offshore and DSND combined their resources and the exclusive charter of the multipurpose icebreakers was transferred to the new company, Subsea 7, that held it until 2004.

Following the reorganization of the Finnish Maritime Administration in 2004, the ownership and management of the state-owned vessels was transferred to a newly founded state-owned enterprise, Finstaship. Later a separate company, GDV Maritime AS, was established together with Norwegian partners and handled the global marketing of the Finnish multipurpose icebreakers until 2008. During this time, the focal point in the marketing of the Finnish multipurpose icebreakers shifted more to offshore activities and the ships returned to their home waters only if they were needed for icebreaking. In 2006, Fennica was the only Finnish multipurpose icebreaker to escort merchant ships in the Finnish waters during the winter months.

In 2010 Arctia Shipping, a state-owned limited company, took over the operations of Finstaship. The ownership and management of the Finnish multipurpose icebreakers was transferred to a subsidiary company, Arctia Offshore. In October 2011, Arctia Offshore and the Finnish Transport Agency signed a five-year contract with an optional two-year extension regarding the use of the multipurpose icebreakers Fennica and Nordica in the Finnish waters during the winter months. Prior to this, Arctia Icebreaking had already signed a similar contract for the conventional Finnish icebreakers.

In November 2011, Shell Oil Company signed a three-year contract with Arctia Offshore and chartered the Finnish multipurpose icebreakers Fennica and Nordica to serve as primary ice management vessels in the Chukchi Sea during the summer seasons. The primary purpose of Fennica would be to protect the drillship Noble Discoverer by steering large ice floes so that they don't endanger the drilling operation. The decision to charter the Finnish icebreakers to support Arctic offshore drilling has been widely criticized due potential environmental damage in case of oil spill. On 16 March 2012, some 52 Greenpeace activists from five different countries boarded Fennica and Nordica at Arctech Helsinki Shipyard to protest Shell's drilling operations in Alaska.

In November 2012, Fennica and her sister ship became the first Finnish icebreakers to sail through the Northern Sea Route when the vessels returned to Finland for the 2012 icebreaking season. During the transit, the multipurpose icebreakers were escorted by Russian nuclear-powered icebreakers Rossiya and Vaygach. In 2013, Fennica and Nordica returned to Finland via the Northern Sea Route for the second time.

In 2015, after the decision from Shell to stop drilling in Alaska, Fennica and Nordica returned to Europe via the Northwest Passage. This late-season eastbound unescorted transit was the first time the Finnish icebreakers have sailed through the Canadian Arctic Archipelago and was claimed to save both time and money. The ships arrived to Nuuk, Greenland, on 31 October 2015.

In 2023, Arctia signed a three-year contract with Baffinland Iron Mines Corporation for icebreaking services of one multipurpose icebreaker during the 2023, 2024 and 2025 shipping seasons in the Canadian Arctic. For the 2023 and 2024 shipping seasons, Fennica was deployed to Canada.

In a press conference on 25 June 2025, President Donald Trump said he had offered President Alexander Stubb to buy a second-hand icebreaker from Finland. Ilta-Sanomat later confirmed that Finland had offered the multipurpose icebreaker Fennica for lease or purchase.

=== Incidents ===
On 2 July 2015, while underway to the Chukchi Sea to support Shell's drilling operations, Fennica struck an uncharted rock that created a 3 feet (1 m) long and about two inches (5 cm) wide fracture in the Port No. 4 ballast tank. When the crew noticed that water level in the tank was rising, the icebreaker turned back and returned to Dutch Harbor for investigations. On 13 July, it was announced that Fennica would head to Vigor Industrial dry dock in Portland, Oregon, for repairs. This was not expected to delay Shell's plans to begin drilling in Northern Alaska as the capping stack, a critical piece of safety equipment carried by Fennica for shutting off the flow of fluids from an oil well in case of a blowout, would not be needed until later when the drill reaches depths where oil and gas are expected to be found.

In Portland, Fennica was met by protesters who opposed Shell's plan to drill oil in the Arctic waters. Greenpeace activists hanging from the St. Johns Bridge as well as "kayaktivists" in the water tried to prevent the icebreaker from returning to Alaska on 30 July. While the protesters were eventually removed, allowing the icebreaker to leave, Greenpeace claimed symbolic victory after the protest had forced the icebreaker to turn back and return to the shipyard earlier that day.

On 9 July, the United States Coast Guard announced that a boat from NOAAS Fairweather had followed Fennica's track from Dutch Harbor and discovered a previously uncharted rocky shoal where the sea depth was shallower than what was indicated in the nautical charts and about 9 inches (23 cm) less than the draft of the icebreaker.

=== Controversies ===
In the early 2000s the managing director Kyösti Vesterinen and several other high-ranking members of the Finnish Maritime Administration were caught in a bribery scandal when it was found out that DSND Offshore, the charterer of the Finnish multipurpose icebreakers, had offered them several private trips around the world. At the same time the offshore company, which had failed to make payments for the charters in time, was forgiven 153,000 euros of penalty interests. As a result, Vesterinen and two other officials were found guilty for corruption and as a result lost their positions, were given suspended sentences of four to ten months and had to pay back the unlawfully obtained benefits. The incident ended the co-operation between DSND and the Finnish Maritime Administration and left many people suspicious about the profitability of the multipurpose icebreakers.

In October 2013, the Finnish media reported that Heidi Hautala (Green League), the Minister for International Development to the Finnish government and the minister responsible for ownership steering in the Prime Minister's Office, had instructed the state-owned Arctia Shipping to withdraw criminal charges against Greenpeace whose activists had boarded the company's multipurpose icebreakers in 2012. In addition, the head of the Government Ownership Steering Department, Pekka Timonen, had threatened two top executives of the company with firing unless they complied with the request. After providing conflicting accounts of the incident, Minister Hautala announced her resignation on 11 October 2013. Later, several prominent people such as the Finnish Minister of Transport Merja Kyllönen have again questioned the profitability of using the multipurpose icebreakers in offshore business and started a discussion of the future role of the Finnish state-owned icebreaker fleet in commercial work in the Arctic.

== Criticism ==
Although the crews have been generally satisfied with the vessels' operational capabilities, the multipurpose icebreakers have also been perceived as compromise designs due to the conflicting requirements of icebreaking and offshore operations. The vessels have been criticized for their lower icebreaking capability and ability to operate in the Bothnian Bay ice conditions characterized by heavy ridging when compared to traditional icebreakers built in the 1970s. In open water, the multipurpose icebreakers have not been competitive against purpose-built offshore vessels due to their higher fuel consumption.

The state-owned shipping company Arctia and its predecessors have also been criticized for the financial losses and low profitability of the offshore business. Unable to compete commercially against purpose-built offshore vessels, the multipurpose icebreakers would be the last ones to be hired unless they were offered at significantly reduced day rates. Sometimes the ships were left without contracts and spent long periods of time in foreign ports even during the Baltic Sea winter navigation season, forcing the Finnish Government to hire icebreakers from the commercial market to keep the ports open.

Arctia also received criticism from environmental organizations such as Greenpeace after the Finnish multipurpose icebreakers were chartered for Shell Oil Company to support exploration drilling operations in the Arctic waters off Alaska where the consequences of an oil spill would be devastating. There have also been concerns about the legal liability in case of an oil spill after a report by the Research Institute of the Finnish Economy claimed that the Finnish State could be held liable and the compensations could include the entire property of Arctia Shipping, the state-owned shipping company that owns and operates the Finnish icebreaker fleet.
