= Arctia (company) =

- Type: Osakeyhtiö
- Founded: 18 December 2009
- Headquarters: Helsinki, Finland
- Key people: Maunu Visuri (CEO)
- Services: Icebreaking; Fairway maintenance; Hydrographic survey
- Revenue: ▲€82,660,000 (2023); €80,206,000 (2022)
- Net income: ▲€3,427,000 (2023); €2,898,000 (2022)
- Owner: Finnish state
- Number of employees: 425 (12/2023)
- Website: arctia.fi

Arctia Oy is Finnish state-owned company responsible for operating a Finnish icebreaker fleet. The company was established as Arctia Shipping Oy in 2010 when Finnish icebreaking services were incorporated. The name of the parent company was changed to Arctia Oy on 18 January 2016. It has following subsidiaries: Arctia Icebreaking Oy (conventional icebreakers), Arctia Offshore Oy (multipurpose icebreakers), Arctia Karhu Oy (port icebreakers and towing), and Arctia Management Services Oy. Arctia has a floating office next to the icebreaker base at Katajanokka in Helsinki.

Arctia provides icebreaking services for Finnish Transport Agency during winter as well as for private companies in the offshore gas- and oilfields.

In 2013 Antti Viirtala, the chairman of the company resigned because of scandal related to the sponsorships of his own curling club.

== History ==
=== Greenpeace case ===
In 2012 a group of Greenpeace activists got onboard icebreakers Fennica and Nordica and demanded that the company stops helping Royal Dutch Shell to drill oil in the Arctic Ocean. Arctia Shipping decided to make a criminal complaint in spite of the will of Minister Heidi Hautala who was responsible for the corporate governance of Arctia Shipping. Hautala's office threatened to fire the management in case that they disobliged.

In October 2013 Hautala decided to resign when the case became public.

== Fleet ==
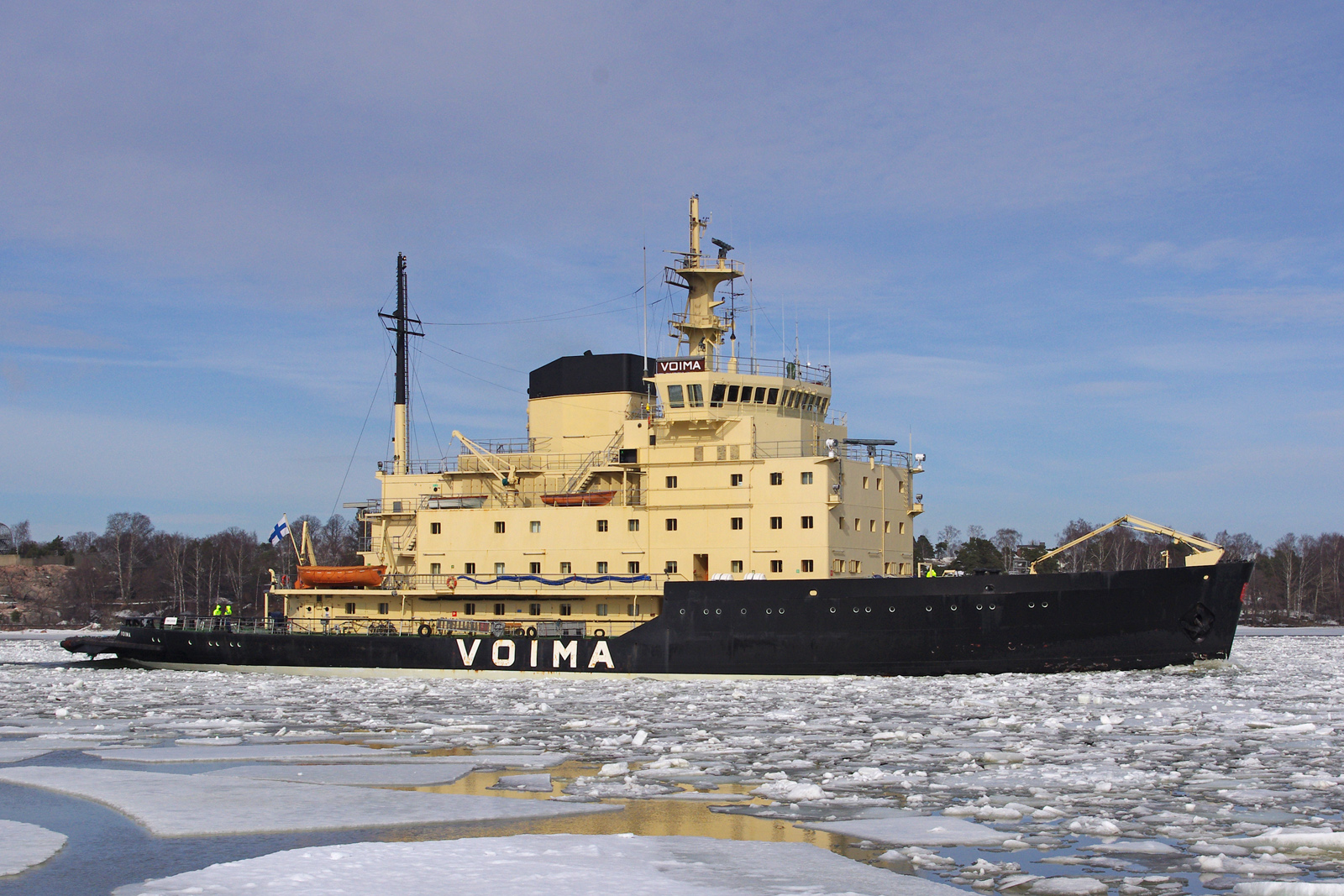
Voima (built 1954; refit 1978–1979)

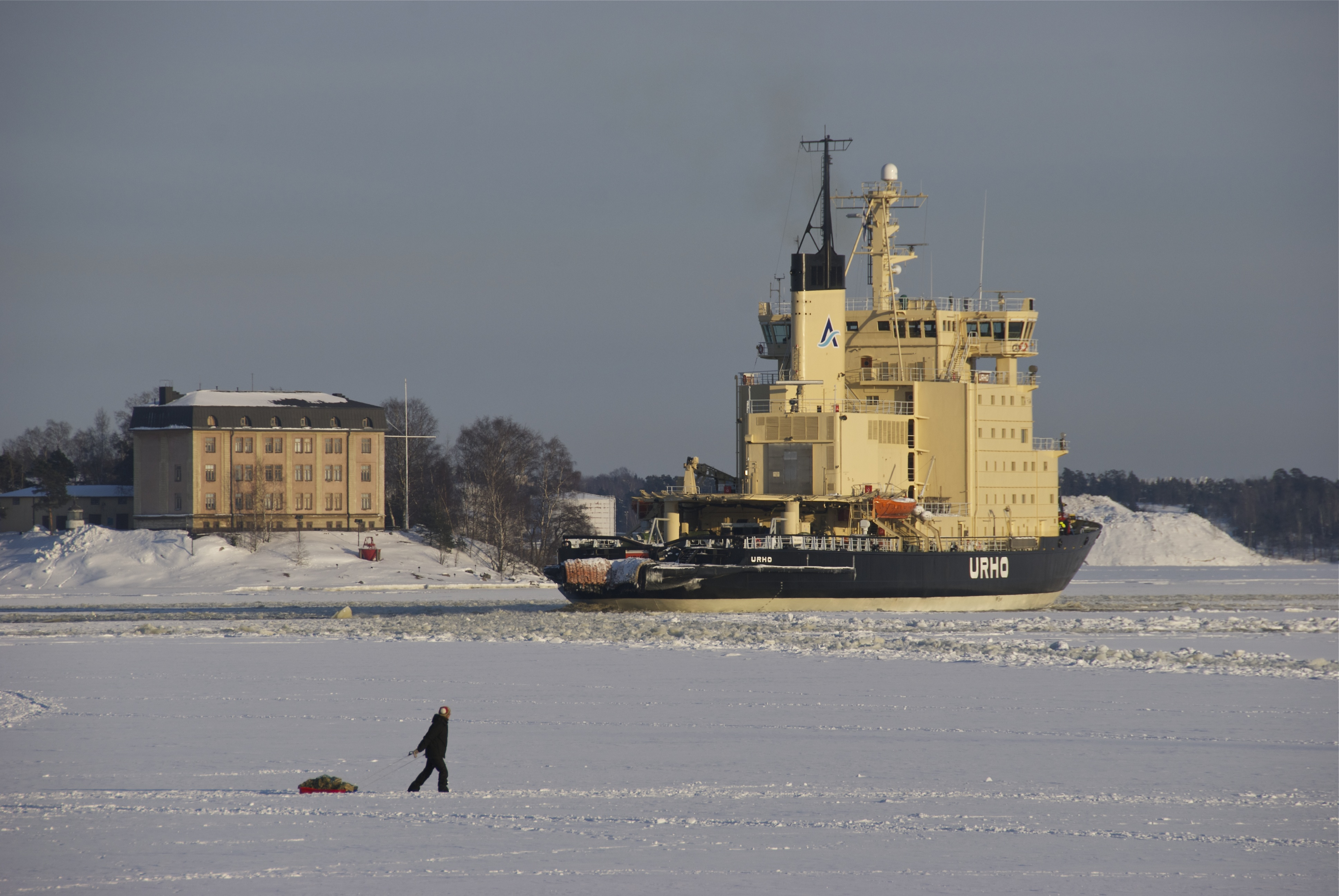
Urho (built 1975)

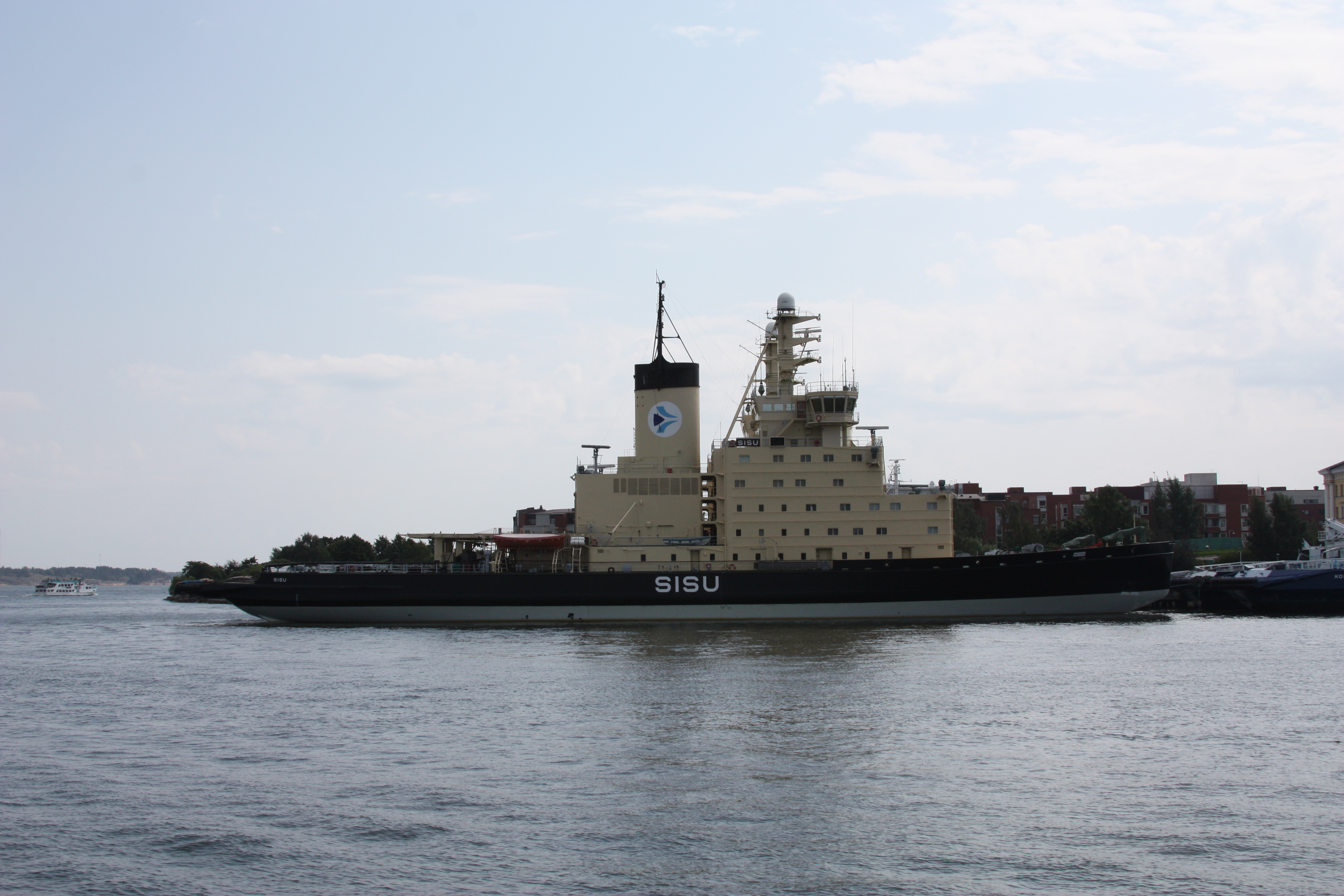
Sisu (built 1976)

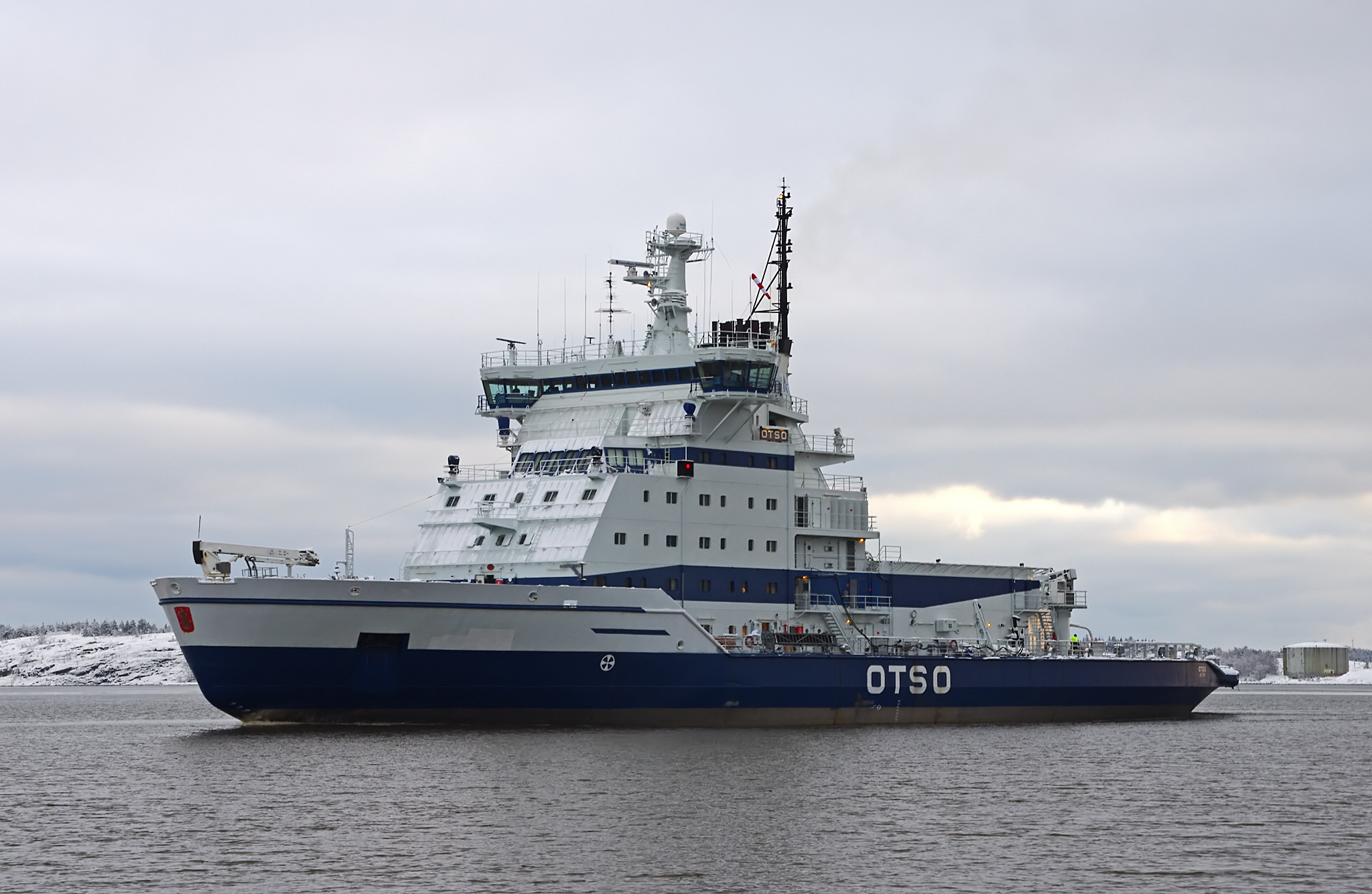
Otso (built 1986)

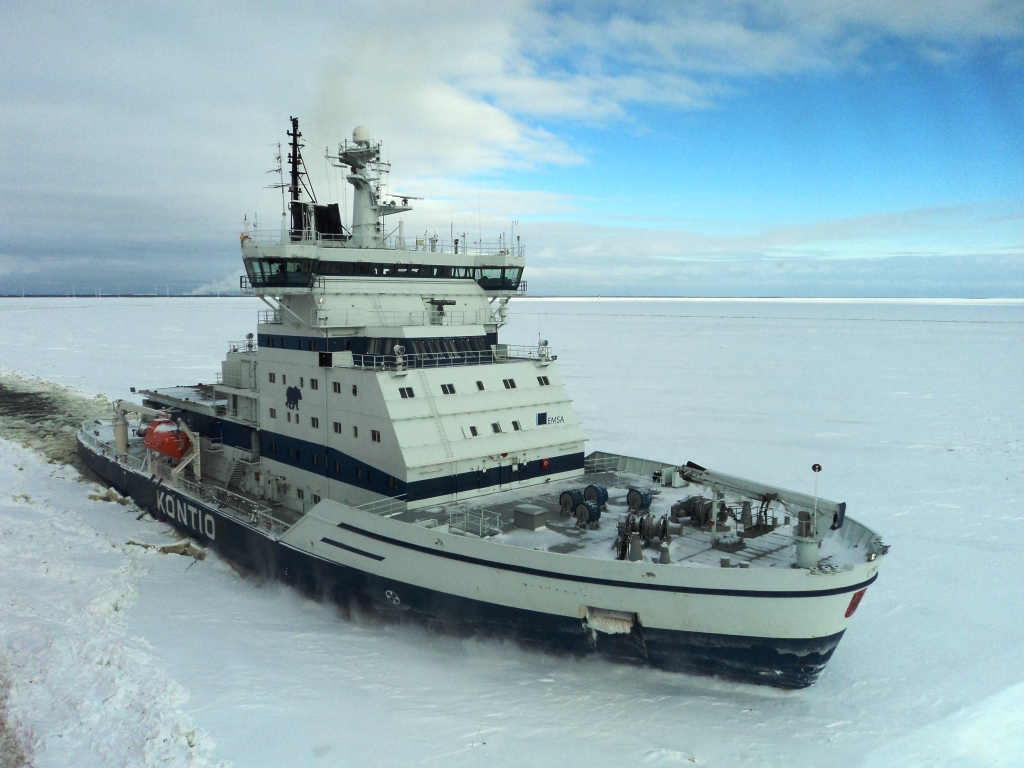
Kontio (built 1987)

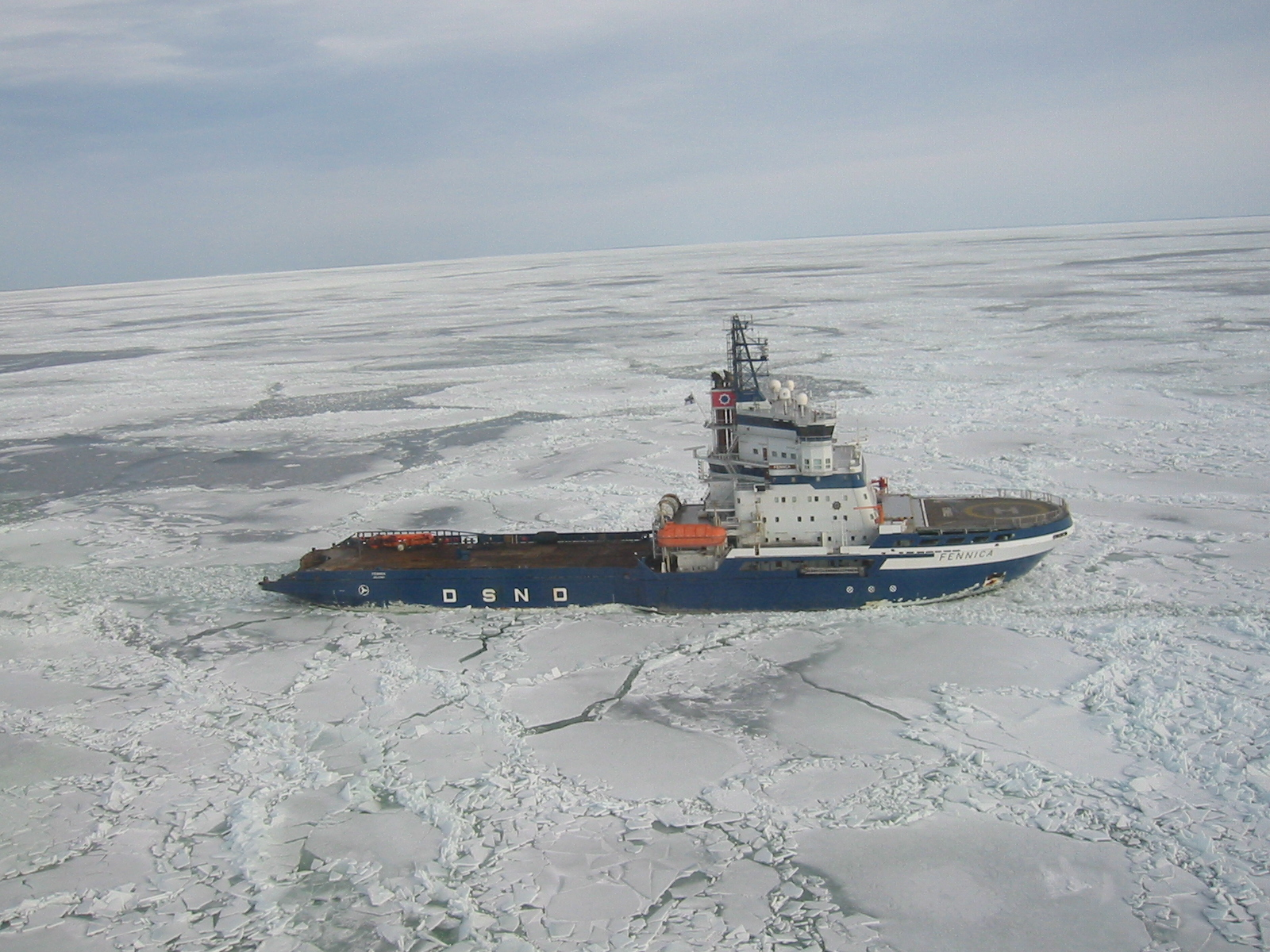
Fennica (built 1993)

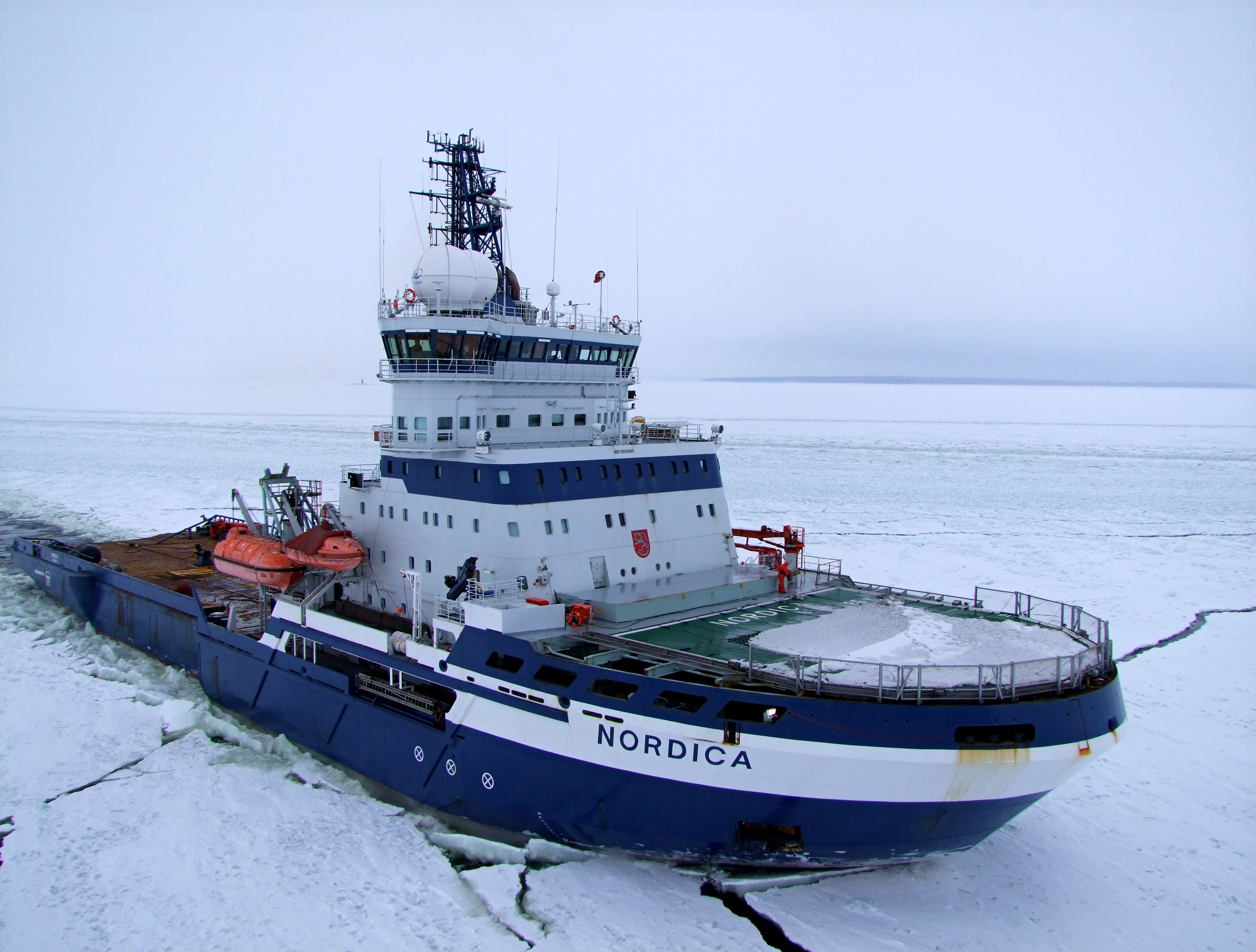
Nordica (built 1994)

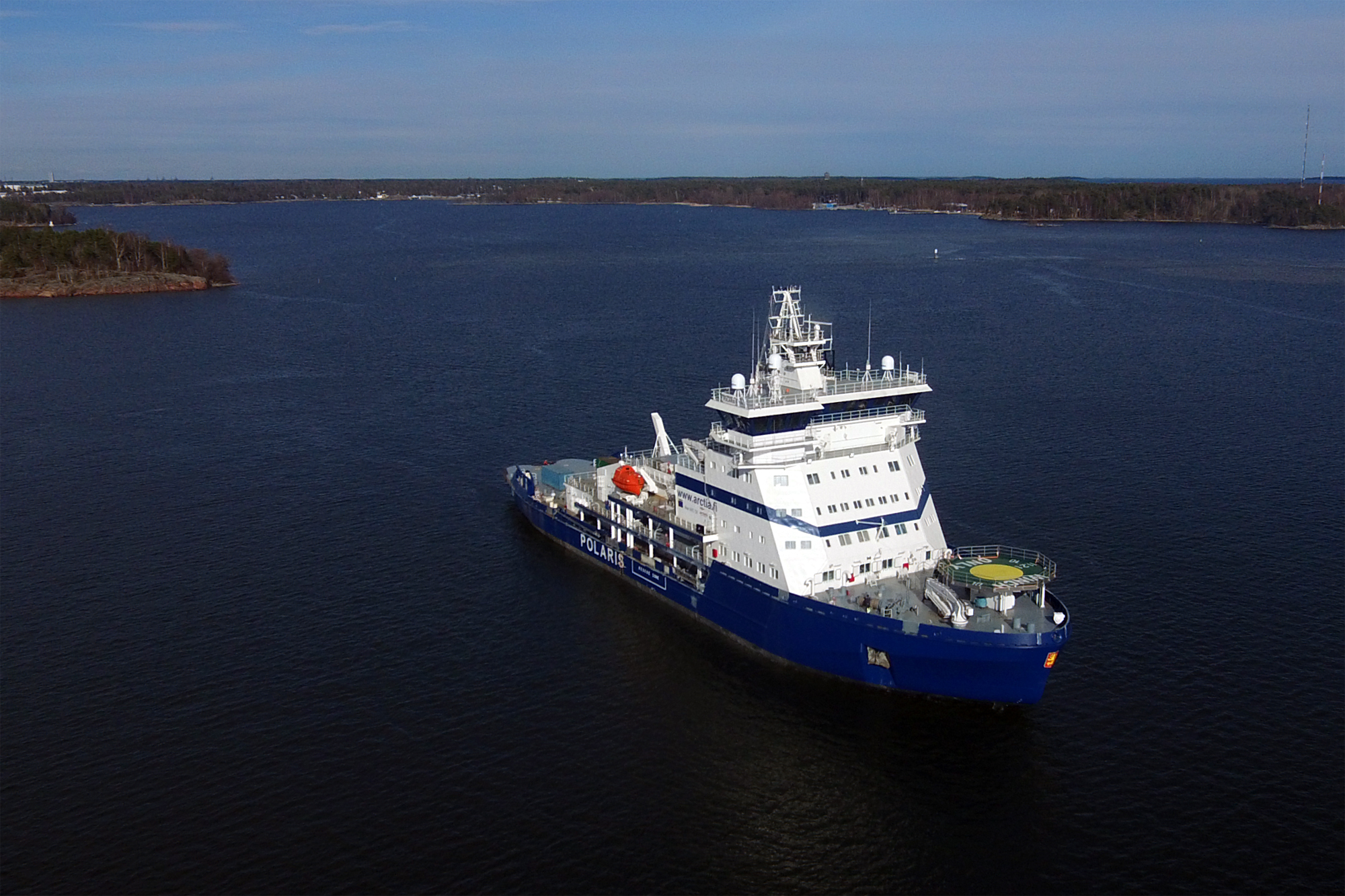
Polaris (built 2016)

== See also ==
- Finnish Transport Agency
