= Tactical diameter =

The tactical diameter of a ship is the distance:

- travelled on sea surface
- during a turning circle test
- with maximum rudder angle
- by the center of gravity of a ship
- taken perpendicular to the initial track followed at approach speed
- when the heading has changed by 180°

The ratio of the tactical diameter divided by the ship's length between perpendiculars gives a dimensionless parameter which can be used to compare ships maneuverability.
