= ILS (company) =

ILS Oy
- Type: Osakeyhtiö
- Founded: 1988
- Headquarters: Turku, Finland
- Key people: Kristian Lehtonen (CEO)
- Services: Naval architecture
- Revenue: €2 million (3/2026); $2 million (3/2025)
- Operating income: ▲€167,808 (3/2026); €145,555 (3/2025)
- Number of employees: 12 (3/2026)
- Website: www.ils.fi

ILS Oy (formerly Insinööritoimisto Lehtonen & Siirilä Oy) is a Finnish engineering company that specializes in winter navigation and the design and development of ice-class ships.

The company was involved in the building of an eco-friendly icebreaker Polaris, which entered service in early 2017.

== Vessel design projects ==
=== Icebreaker Polaris ===
ILS prepared the concept design of the Finnish icebreaker Polaris jointly with Aker Arctic Technology. Built by Arctech Helsinki Shipyard, the 110-metre vessel was handed over to the Finnish Transport Agency on 28 September 2016 and passed to the state-owned operator Arctia Icebreaking. It was the first icebreaker able to run on liquefied natural gas, with low-sulphur diesel as the alternative fuel, and it meets IMO Tier III emission limits and the sulphur requirements applying in the Baltic Sea. Classed Polar Class 4, the ship is rated to advance through 1.8 metres of ice at 3.5 knots.

The decision to procure a ship intended solely for icebreaking was contested in Finland. Arctia had argued for a multipurpose vessel capable of commercial employment outside the ice season, whereas those favouring a dedicated icebreaker pointed to the roughly 50 per cent higher building cost of earlier Finnish dual-purpose ships such as Fennica and to their weak price competitiveness against purpose-built towing and supply vessels.

=== Detachable icebreaking bow ===
In the 2010s the company designed a detachable icebreaking bow intended to turn a harbour tug into a vessel approaching the capability of a multipurpose icebreaker. Bows attached to the front of another vessel had been used on Lake Saimaa before; the novelty of the design lay in giving the bow its own engines and propellers, adding both mass and breaking force to the pushing tug. According to the company's managing director Jyrki Lehtonen, the bow rides onto the ice sheet and forces it downwards, after which the broken ice passes beneath the edge of the channel so that the lane left astern remains clear for shipping. He also said that the project had attracted attention at a shipbuilding trade fair in Rotterdam, with several European yards showing interest in the construction tender despite the modest size of the contract.

Scale-model testing was carried out in the ice laboratory of Aker Arctic. The Finnish Transport Agency, which ran the procurement, expected the arrangement to open a lane at least 12.6 metres wide, wider than the existing Saimaa icebreakers could manage, and saw flexibility as a further advantage, since the tug can be released for other duties once the ice season ends. The agency also considered that, should the solution prove workable on Saimaa, larger bows might later be built for coastal waters.

The bow, named Saimaa, was constructed at the Turku Repair Yard in Naantali and brought to Lake Saimaa at the end of 2020, arriving at Mustola harbour in Lappeenranta in December. It is pushed by Calypso, a tug owned by the Turku shipping company Alfons Håkans, and the two were described as the first combination of its kind in the world. The unit entered sustained service on 22 March 2021, when the Saimaa Canal opened to cargo traffic. Although the bow is termed detachable, transferring it to another vessel would require modifications to both the bow and the pusher, including mounting points and remote control systems; under the agreement with the owner it is to remain with Calypso for eight years.

The bow is of full channel width at 12.6 metres, and the Finnish Transport Infrastructure Agency estimated that the combination would move through fast ice up to 70 centimetres thick, a figure to be verified in formal ice trials; ice on Saimaa is normally at most 50 to 60 centimetres thick. Together the bow and tug measure 40 metres, some ten metres less than the icebreaking tug Protector with a conventional bow, which makes the unit more manoeuvrable in the canal. The agency presented the arrangement as a way of producing a full-width lane without investing in a larger icebreaker.

== Assistance icebreaker tender ==
In September 2024 the Finnish Transport Infrastructure Agency announced an open procedure for the preliminary design of a Baltic assistance icebreaker, together with a comparison of three concept alternatives and the associated model tests, with an estimated value of about €2.5 million excluding value-added tax. ILS tendered as a consortium with the Canadian naval architecture firm Vard Marine. The agency selected the tender of Aker Arctic Technology in October 2024 and excluded the consortium's tender, on the ground that the specialist it had named to lead deck department design lacked the required experience: the invitation to tender called for two concept design projects within the previous fifteen years, one of them an assistance icebreaker of at least 5 MW propulsion power fitted with a towing notch, and none of the reference vessels submitted had such a notch.

The consortium appealed, arguing that the requirement did not reflect the actual duties of a deck department designer and operated to exclude designers working outside Finland, Sweden and Russia. The Market Court dismissed the appeal on 3 April 2025, holding that the contracting authority had not exceeded its discretion, that the experience requirement was connected to the subject matter of the contract and proportionate to it, and that an authority need not adapt tender conditions to the supply available on the market. ILS and Vard Marine were ordered to pay, jointly and severally, €2,250 towards the agency's legal costs and €5,000 towards those of Aker Arctic.
