= Research Institute of the Finnish Economy =

Finnish think tank

Coordinates: 60.171683°N 24.924851°E

ETLA Economic Research (Finnish: Elinkeinoelämän tutkimuslaitos, Swedish: Näringslivets forskningsinstitut), commonly known by its Finnish acronym ETLA or Etla, is a private, non-profit research institute based in Helsinki, Finland. It conducts independent, applied economic research into key issues affecting Finnish business and the national economy

== History ==
Etla was founded on August 1, 1946, when it was called the Economic Research Centre. Rapid postwar political and economic changes created a need for basic economic information throughout Finland. Soon its focus moved to long-term research studies, particularly economic growth and productivity. By the 1970s, Etla was producing regular economic forecasts. Today, Etla continues to maintain a steady output of reliable independent research on the Finnish economy.

Other Finnish research organisations in the same field, such as VATT Institute for Economic Research, Pellervo Economic Research PTT, and the Labour Institute for Economic Research LABORE sometimes collaborate with Etla on various research projects. It also cooperates extensively with international research bodies, including universities, business colleges and other research institutes.

Etla shares its CEO, Board of Directors and financial administration with the Finnish Business and Policy Forum EVA . They also occupy the same premises.

== Research activities ==
Etla follows two main themes: the impact of Finnish economic policy and the impact of megatrends emerging in around the world. These are addressed under four research areas:

- Labour market and education
- Growth, international trade and competition
- Macroeconomy and public finances
- Business renewal

Etlatieto Ltd is an Etla subsidiary that conducts externally-financed project research. Its core competence is business and industrial economics, with a particular interest in the global economy.

== Publications ==
Etla regularly publishes its research in books and reports, mostly in Finnish with English abstracts, but also fully in English, depending on the intended audience. Etla distributes its publications on its official website and through the websites of the organisations that fund its research. Research is also published in various peer-reviewed academic journals.

Economic forecasts are issued biannually in Etla’s Finnish-language Suhdanne ("Economic Trend") online magazine. A summary in English is published separately at the same time.

== Governance and funding ==
Etla’s activities are guided by a support association composed of six member organisations who provide about one third of its overall funding. Research is mostly funded by public agencies like the Academy of Finland and Business Finland, government ministries, the Nordic Council of Ministers, the European Commission, and private foundations.

Since March 2019, the CEO has been Aki Kangasharju. Etla employs around 40 people.
