= Osakeyhtiö =

Type of business entity in Finland

Osakeyhtiö (Finnish pronunciation: [ˈosɑkeʔˌʔyhtiø]; "stock company"), often abbreviated to Oy (pronounced [ˈoːˌyː]), is the term for a Finnish limited company (e.g., Ltd, LLC, or GmbH). The Swedish-language term is aktiebolag, often abbreviated (in Finland) to Ab. The Swedish abbreviation is sometimes included, as in Ab Company Oy, Oy Company Ab, or Company Oy Ab. The abbreviations have been styled in many ways, such as Oy, OY, O.Y., or even O/Y. The English form is Ltd.

== Julkinen osakeyhtiö ==
Julkinen osakeyhtiö (pl. julkiset osakeyhtiöt) means "public stock company" and is abbreviated to Oyj (pronounced [ˈoːˌyːˌjiː]). A julkinen osakeyhtiö can be listed on the Nasdaq Helsinki. The term's Swedish equivalent is Abp (publikt aktiebolag). A julkinen osakeyhtiö may be called a public limited company or public company in English and may use the abbreviation PLC or the term Corporation in the company's English name, for example Finnair Plc, Remedy Entertainment Plc, Kone Corporation and Nokia Corporation.

== Related types of Finnish companies ==
- Avoin yhtiö, ay, general partnership
- Kommandiittiyhtiö, abbreviated ky, limited partnership
- Rekisteröity yhdistys, abbreviated ry, registered association (in Swedish: Registrerad förening, abbreviated rf)

== See also ==
- List of companies of Finland
