= Sierra de la Virgen =

Mountain range in Aragon, Spain

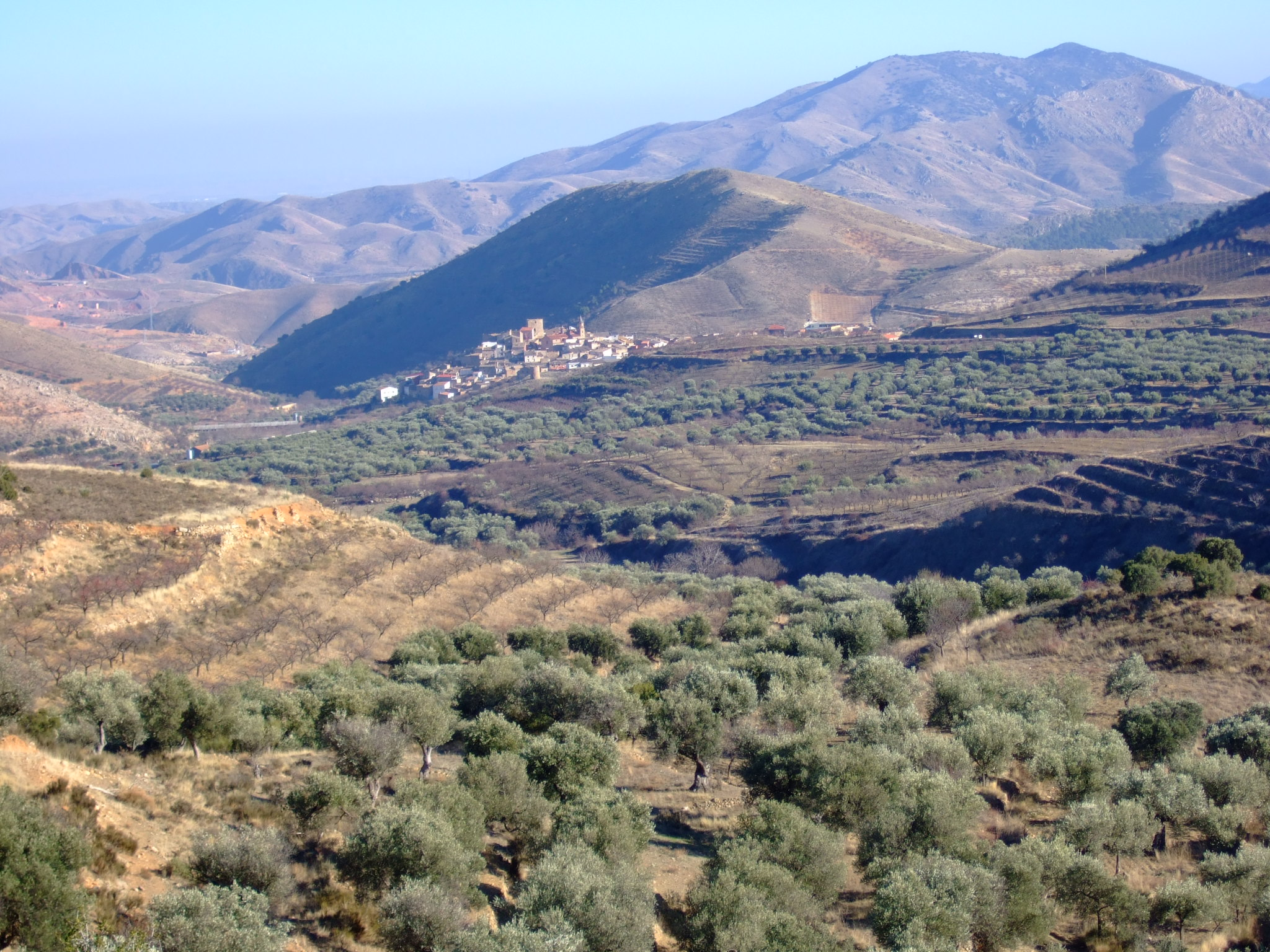
- Sierra de la Virgen rising behind Sestrica

Highest point
- Peak: Cabrera
- Elevation: 1,433 m (4,701 ft)
- Listing: List of mountains in Aragon
- Coordinates: 41°31′32″N 01°44′24″W

Geography
- Location within Spain
- Location: Aranda Comarca &Comunidad de Calatayud (Aragon)
- Parent range: Sistema Ibérico

Geology
- Orogeny: Alpine orogeny
- Rock age: Cambrian
- Rock type(s): Slate and Quartzite

Climbing
- First ascent: Unknown
- Easiest route: Drive from Villarroya de la Sierra, Viver de la Sierra, Gotor or Jarque

Sierra de la Virgen is a mountain range in the Aranda and Comunidad de Calatayud comarcas, Aragon, Spain. It is located south of the Moncayo Massif between the valleys of the Jalón and the Aranda rivers, rising north of the N-234 road, roughly between Calatayud and Torrelapaja.

== Geography ==
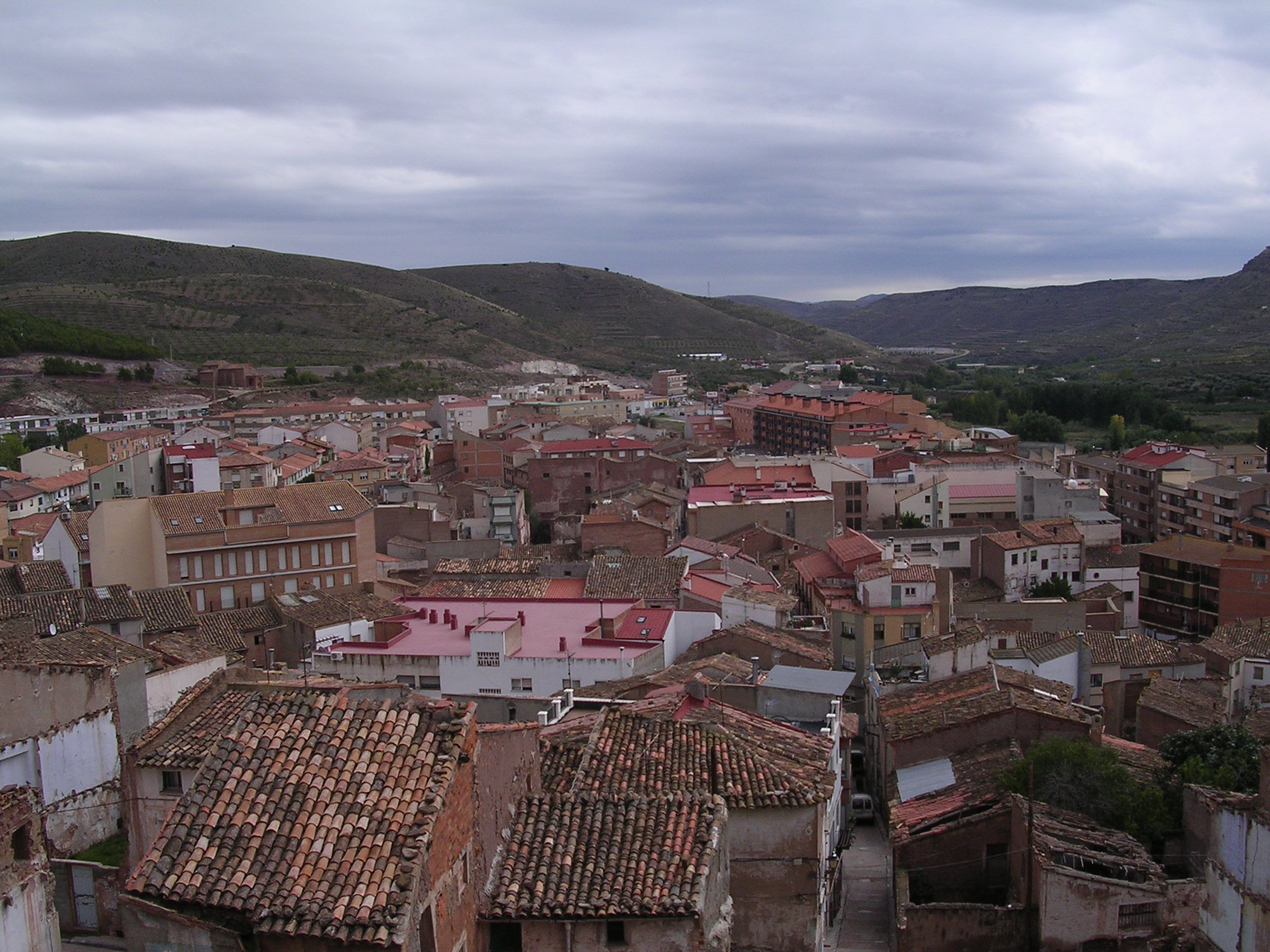
The Sierra de la Virgen above Illueca

The ridge is aligned in a NW-SE direction. Its highest point is Cabrera (1,433 m); other important summits are Virgen de la Sierra (1,413 m), Cucuta (1,300 m), San Cristóbal (1,264 m), Pico de Morés (1,186 m) and Monte de la Lezna (1,173 m). The adjacent Sierra de Vicort stretches east of Sierra de la Virgen in the same direction.

The name of this mountain chain derives from the Santuario de la Virgen de la Sierra, a Virgin Mary shrine located in the heights of the mountain range, about 22 km to the north of Villarroya de la Sierra town.

These mountains are mostly covered with low maquis shrub and they have been repopulated with pine since the 20th century. The Sierra de la Virgen is often subject to wildfires in periods of prolonged drought. Native trees include juniper and Carrasca (Quercus ilex), among others.

There are other smaller mountain chains named "Sierra de la Virgen" in Spain. One is in Ciudad Real Province, part of the Montes de Toledo, and the other is located in Córdoba Province, Andalusia.

== See also ==
- Mountains of Aragon
- Aranda Comarca
