= Pour être libre =

"Pour être libre" may refer to:

- Pour être libre (album), a 2005 studio album by French singer Lââm
  - "Pour être libre" (Lââm song), the title track from the album
- "Pour être libre", a 1997 song the by French band 2Be3
- Pour être libre, a 1997 French television series
