= The Island of Christianity: Armenia & Artsakh =

The Island of Christianity: Armenia and Artsakh
- The Island of Christianity: Armenia & Artsakh Blu-ray, DVD, CD

Video
- Released: 17 September 2013
- Recorded: London, England, Abbey Road Studios
- Genre: Opera
- Length: 113 min.
- Language: English, Spanish, Armenian, Russian, French and German
- Producer: Garik Israelyan

The Island of Christianity: Armenia & Artsakh is 3-Disc set of Blu-ray, DVD and CD. It has been filmed in 2013 in Armenia and Artsakh during Montserrat Caballé's visit as homage to the 1700th anniversary of the adoption of Christianity. Special Guests: Vangelis, Brian May, Montserrat Martí. The Island of Christianity is Montserrat Caballe's last album.

== Background ==
More than 1700 years ago, Armenia became the world's first Christian nation. That is why the most ancient churches and monasteries in the world, such as St. Etchmiadzin (Armenia, IV c.) and Amaras (Artsakh, V c.) are located in Armenia and Artsakh. In 2013, Montserrat Caballé visited many of these churches as homage to the 1700th anniversary of the adoption of Christianity. This collection, in its turn, is an act of homage to the great soprano for her anniversary on the part of the Armenian nation, a sign of profound admiration and gratitude.

== Songs listing ==
- 1. Krunk - Komitas

Voice: Montserrat Caballé (in Armenian)
Performed by the Royal Philharmonic Orchestra
Conducted by Simon Hale
Armenian duduk performed by Norayr Kartashyan, Produced by John Metcalfe
Recorded at Abbey Road Studios in London

- 2. Chinar es - Komitas

Voice: Montserrat Caballé (in Armenian)
Performed by the Royal Philharmonic Orchestra
Conducted by Simon Hale
Armenian duduk performed by Norayr Kartashyan
Produced by John Metcalfe
Recorded at Abbey Road Studios in London

- 3. Habanera - Vangelis

Voice: Montserrat Caballé and Montserrat Martí
Composed by Vangelis for Montserrat Caballé on her Anniversary
Lyrics by Montserrat Caballé
Produced by Vangelis
Performed by the Royal Philharmonic Orchestra
Conducted by Simon Hale
Armenian duduk performed by Vardan Grigoryan
Mixed by Vangelis and Frederick Rousseau
Engineered by Frederick Rousseau
Orchestra recorded at Abbey Road Studios in London
Mixed at Studio Guillaume Tell in Paris
Associate Mixing Engineer Denis Caribaux
Co-produced John Metcalfe

- 4. Lascia ch’io pianga - G. F. Händel

Voice: Montserrat Caballé
Performed by the Cadaqués Orchestra
Conducted by José Collado
Recorded at Auditorio de Zaragoza

- 5. Dignare - G. F. Händel

Voice: Montserrat Caballé
Performed by the Cadaqués Orchestra
Conducted by José Collado
Recorded at Auditorio de Zaragoza

- 6. Ave Maria - Franz Schubert

Voice: Montserrat Caballé
Performed by the Cadaqués
Orchestra and Choir Conducted by José Collado
Recorded at Auditorio de Zaragoza

- 7. Ave Maria - Giulio Caccini

Voice: Montserrat Caballé
Performed by the Cadaqués Orchestra
Conducted by José Collado
Recorded at Auditorio de Zaragoza

- 8. Like a dream - Vangelis

Voice: Montserrat Caballé
Performed by the Russian Philharmonic Orchestra and Bolshoi Chorus
Conducted by Sergei Tararin
Recorded at Mosfilm in Moscow

- 9. Is this the world we created? - Freddie Mercury and Brian May

Voice: Montserrat Caballé
Guitar: Brian May
Arranged and produced by Brian May
Co-produced and engineered by Justin Shirley-Smith and Kris Fredriksson
Orchestra arranged and conducted by Stuart Morley
Orchestra recorded by Andrew Dudman at Abbey Road Studios in London
Orchestra contracted by Sylvia Addison for Music Solutions Ltd
Orchestra leader - Rita Manning
Brian May management - Jim Beach

- 10. Yerevan - Artemi Ayvazyan

Voice: Montserrat Martí in Armenian
Performed by the Royal Philharmonic Orchestra
Conducted by Simon Hale
Produced by John Metcalfe

== Videos ==
- 1. Faith: Gandzasar Monastery - Krunk - Komitas
- 2. Hope: Haghartsin Monastery - Chinar es - Komitas
- 3. Love: Noravank Monastery - Ave Maria - Franz Schubert
- 4. Penitence: Geghard Monastery - Lascia ch'io pianga - G. F. Händel
- 5. Dream: Dadivank Monastery - Like a dream - Vangelis
- 6. Baptism: Goshavank Monastery - Ave Maria - Giulio Caccini
- 7. Eternity: Saghmosavank Monastery - Dignare - G. F. Händel

Exclusive videos

- Habanera - Vangelis
- Is this the world we created? - Freddie Mercury and Brian May
- Yerevan - Artemi Ayvazyan
