= Chanter pour ceux qui sont loin de chez eux =

1985 song by Michel Berger

Single by Lââm

from the album Persévérance
- B-side: "Laissez-moi aller au bout de mes rêves"
- Released: September 1998
- Genre: Pop, soul
- Length: 4:20
- Label: EMI
- Songwriter: Michel Berger
- Producer: SDO

Lââm singles chronology
"Chanter pour ceux qui sont loin de chez eux" (1998)	"Assez!" (1999)

Alternative cover
- Cover for Michel Berger's 1985 version

"Chanter pour ceux qui sont loin de chez eux" (English: Sing for those who are far from home) is a 1985 song recorded by French singer-songwriter Michel Berger on his album Différences. It was released as a single one year later.

== Lââm version ==
In 1998, the song was covered by French singer Lââm and was released in September 1998 as her debut single and the lead single from her album Persévérance. The song was released two years before, in 1996, but passed unnoticed at the time. Lââm promoted the song singing it live in many French TV shows; for example, in Tapis rouge, she cried a lot after her performance. The single became a number-one hit for five weeks in Belgium (Wallonia) and peaked at number two for ten weeks in France, being unable to dislodge "Belle" by Garou, Patrick Fiori and Daniel Lavoie, stayed in the top 100 for 42 weeks, becoming Lââm's most successful single, and was certified diamond disc. Lââm accompanied by 500 Choristes sung it in a live version in 2006 on the album 500 Choristes Vol. 2.

=== Track listings ===
- CD single
1. "Chanter pour ceux qui sont loin de chez eux" (radio edit) – 4:20
2. "Chanter pour ceux qui sont loin de chez eux" (R&B mix) – 4:21
3. "Laissez-moi aller au bout de mes rêves" – 4:33

== Charts ==
=== Weekly charts ===
Chart (1998)	Peak position
Belgium (Ultratop 50 Wallonia)	1
France (SNEP)	2

=== Year-end charts ===
Chart (1998)	Position
Belgium (Ultratop 50 Wallonia)	8
France (SNEP)	13

Chart (1999)	Position
Belgium (Ultratop 40 Wallonia)	59
Europe (Eurochart Hot 100)	50
France (SNEP)	17

=== Certifications ===
Region	Certification	Certified units/sales
France (SNEP)	Diamond	750,000^{*}
^{*} Sales figures based on certification alone.

== Other covers ==
Montserrat Caballé and Johnny Hallyday covered the song jointly in 1997 on the album Friends for Life,

Other notable cover versions include Chico & The Gypsies in the full title of the song and by Florent Pagny, Kids United and The Song Family in a shortened title "Chanter pour ceux".
