= Bernabé Martí =

Spanish operatic tenor (1928–2022)

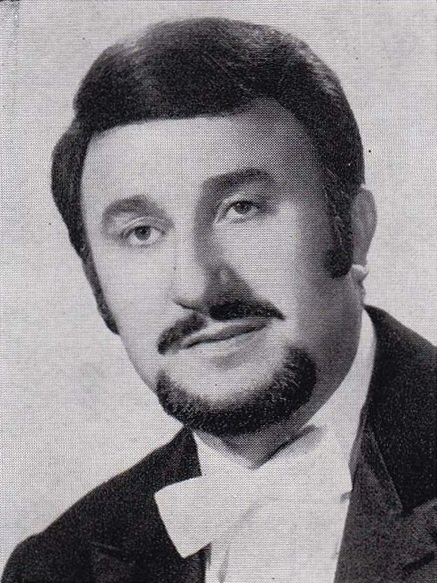
- Martí in 1972
- Born: Bernabé Martínez Remacha; 14 November 1928; Villarroya de la Sierra, Aragon, Kingdom of Spain
- Died: 18 March 2022 (aged 93); Barcelona, Catalonia, Spain
- Occupation: Operatic tenor
- Years active: 1956–1985
- Spouse: Montserrat Caballé (m. 1964; died 2018)
- Children: 2, including Montserrat Martí

Bernabé Martínez Remacha (14 November 1928 – 18 March 2022), known professionally as Bernabé Martí, was a Spanish (Aragonese) operatic tenor.

== Career ==
Martí was born as Bernabé Martínez Remacha, the sixth and last child of his family, in Villarroya de la Sierra in the Province of Zaragoza, Aragon. His early musical training was in the saxophone in his municipal band. He later studied singing in Zaragoza, the Madrid Royal Conservatory under José Luis Lloret, the Accademia Nazionale di Santa Cecilia in Rome, and the Accademia Musicale Chigiana in Siena. He also had lessons with the soprano Mercedes Llopart in Milan.

His first critical success came with Manuel de Falla's La vida breve in Granada in 1958, followed by Salome in Düsseldorf under Alberto Erede. He then toured for two years singing in various European cities. In 1960 he performed at the Liceu in Barcelona in the premiere of El cap de drac by Ricard Lamote de Grignon.

At that time he changed his professional name to Bernabé Martí. He later appeared in France, Germany, Buenos Aires, Mexico City, Lima, Caracas and Santiago de Chile, in operas such as Carmen, Werther and Manon Lescaut.

His Carnegie Hall debut was in Il pirata, followed by Il trovatore, Rigoletto, Tosca, Werther, Turandot, Pagliacci, Carmen and Norma, in American cities such as San Antonio, Washington D.C., Dallas, Houston and Baltimore, as well as in Kansas. He sang Gabriele Adorno in Simon Boccanegra in Philadelphia. The tenor appeared with the New York City Opera from 1967 to 1971, debuting as Luigi in Il tabarro.

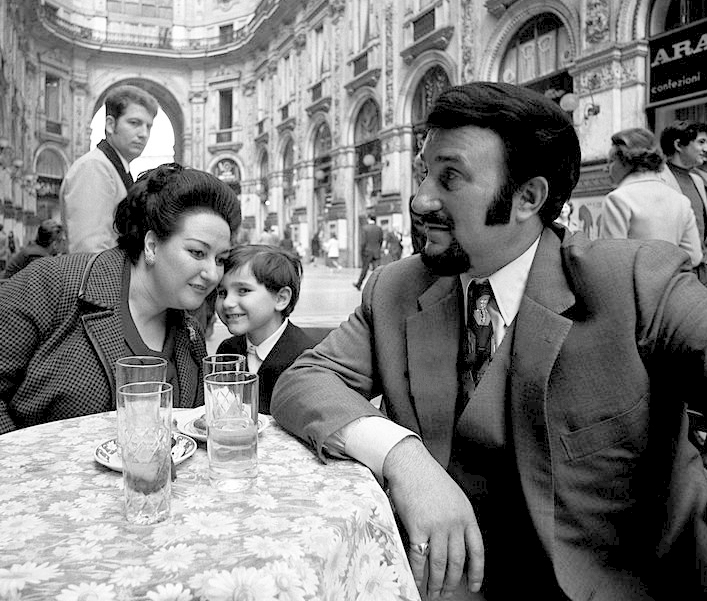
Montserrat Caballé, Martí and their son Bernabé in Milan, Italy, in 1971

On 14 August 1964 he married the soprano Montserrat Caballé at Santa Maria de Montserrat Abbey. They had met earlier that year when on short notice he replaced an ailing tenor for performances of Madama Butterfly in Corunna. Martí and Caballé later sang together many times. They had a son, Bernabé, and a daughter, Montserrat, who is also an opera singer.

In 1972 he had to abandon a performance in Paris due to problems with his voice, which was subsequently identified as lung disease. He responded to treatment, but his career came to an end in 1985 after he was diagnosed with a cardiac condition.

He died on 18 March 2022 at the age of 93 in his home in Barcelona.
