= Aranda (comarca) =

Comarca del Aranda
- Comarca

- Flag Coat of arms
- Interactive map of Comarca del Aranda
- Coordinates: 41°32′N 1°37′W
- Country: Spain
- Autonomous community: Aragon
- Province: Zaragoza
- Capital: Illueca
- Municipalities: List: See text

Area
  - Total: 561 km^{2} (217 sq mi)

Population
  - Total: 8,018
  - Density: 14.3/km^{2} (37.0/sq mi)
- Time zone: UTC+1 (CET)
  - Summer (DST): UTC+2 (CEST)
- Largest municipality: Illueca

Aranda is a comarca in Aragon, Spain. Its capital is Illueca.

The Aranda and the Isuela River flow through this sparsely populated comarca located in a mountainous area of the Iberian System.

== Municipalities ==
- Aranda de Moncayo
- Brea de Aragón
- Calcena
- Gotor
- Illueca
- Jarque
- Mesones de Isuela
- Oseja
- Pomer
- Purujosa
- Sestrica
- Tierga
- Trasobares

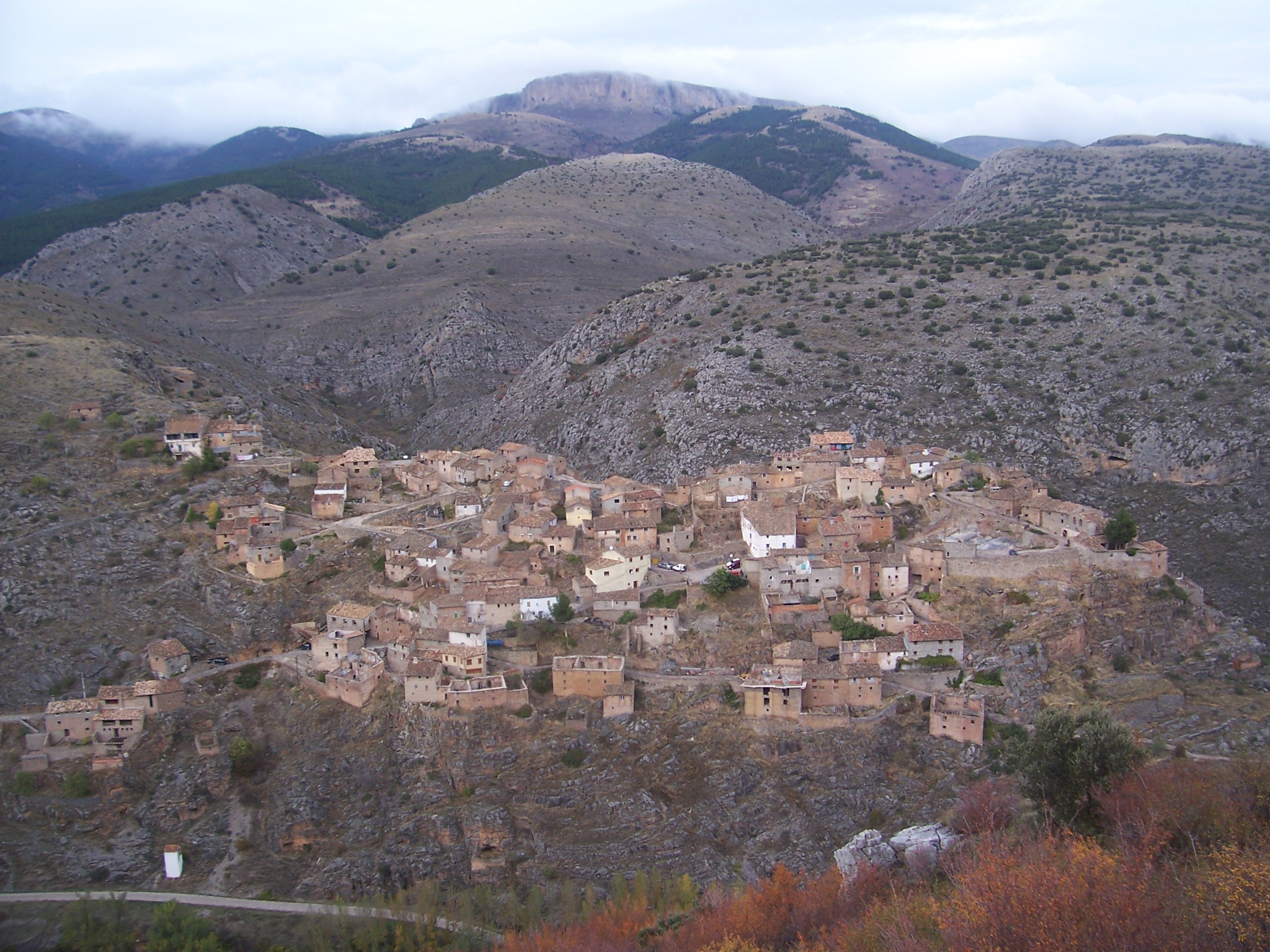
Purujosa town seen from the Cabezo summit
