= Khadja Nin =

Burundian singer and musician (born 1959)

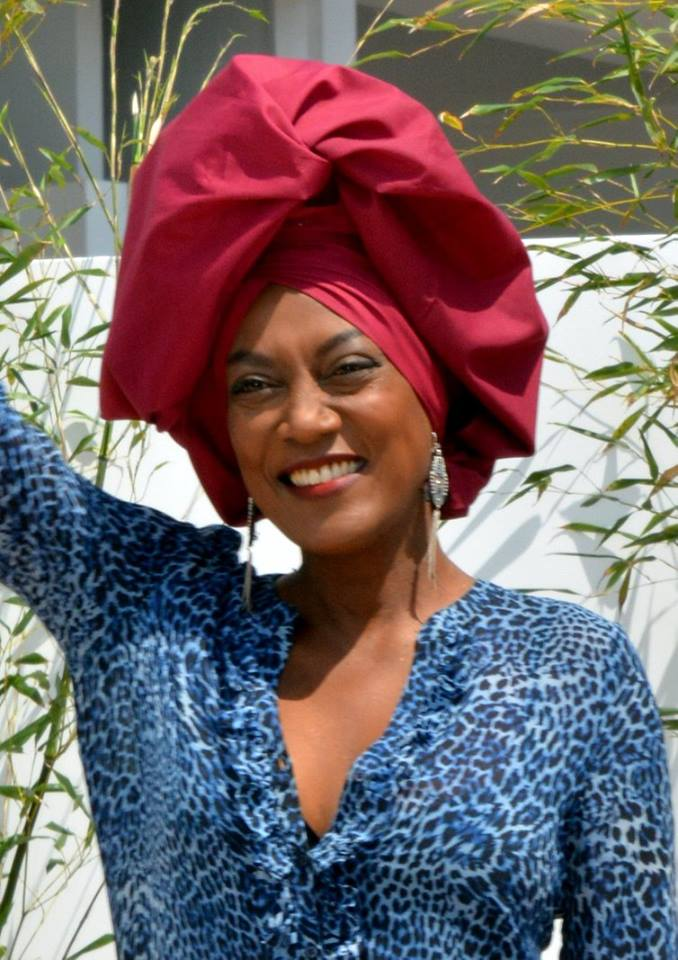
- Khadja Nin at the 2018 Cannes Film Festival.

Background information
- Born: Khadja Nin; 27 June 1959 (age 67); Bujumbura, Ruanda-Urundi
- Genre: Afro-pop
- Occupation: Singer
- Years active: 1980s–present
- Label: BMG

Jeanine Rema, known professionally as Khadja Nin (born 27 June 1959), is a Burundian singer and musician.

Rema was born in Burundi, the youngest of a family of eight. Her father was a senior diplomat and Minister of the Interior of the Kingdom of Burundi. She studied music at an early age like most of her brothers and sisters. With her exceptional singing voice, at the age of seven she became one of the lead vocalists in the Bujumbura choir and performed in the local cathedral. She left Burundi for Zaire in 1975 and married in 1978. In 1980 she emigrated to Belgium with her two-year-old son. In 1985 she obtained a contract with BMG. Her second album, a 1994 release entitled Ya Pili, was critically acclaimed.

Her breakthrough came in 1996 with her widely popular album Sambolera, which was sung in Swahili, Kirundi, and French. In 1997 she performed the song "Sailing" in a duet with Montserrat Caballé on the album Friends For Life. She successfully used a blend of African rhythms and modern pop to create her own unique brand of music. One of her most popular songs is Sina Mali, Sina Deni, a translated cover version of Stevie Wonder's song Free.

The first album was released in 1992, sung in Swahili. But it is best known in France in 1995 with the title Sambolera Mayi Son, the title of the second album, Ya Pili (The second). The third album is a compilation of old and new titles. Jeanne Moreau makes the clip illustrating her song Mama, where she talks about her mother, on her fourth album Ya ... . The texts of this album are in Swahili or Kirundi (for the chorus of the title Mama). The album also includes a cover of a piece by Gabonese musician Pierre Akendengué, Africa Obota, and a song by Stevie Wonder, "Free" that she renamed "Sina mali, sina deni" (I am neither rich nor indebted). Another piece pays tribute to Nelson Mandela, and a song calls for easing the embargo imposed on Burundi.

In January 2000, she sang at AccorHotels Arena (at the time Palais Omnisports de Paris-Bercy) with Sting and Cheb Mami. She remarried in 2006 to Belgian racing driver Jacky Ickx, and they settled in Monaco. In this marriage, she has had a son who lives in Belgium.

In 2018, she was a jury member at the Cannes Film Festival, under the presidency of Cate Blanchett, alongside actresses Léa Seydoux and Kristen Stewart, director Ava DuVernay, actor Chang Chen and directors Robert Guédiguian, Denis Villeneuve and Andrey Zvyagintsev.

== Discography ==
- 1992 – Khadja Nin
- 1994 – Ya Pili
- 1996 – Sambolera
- 1998 – Ya ...
