= Purujosa =

- municipality
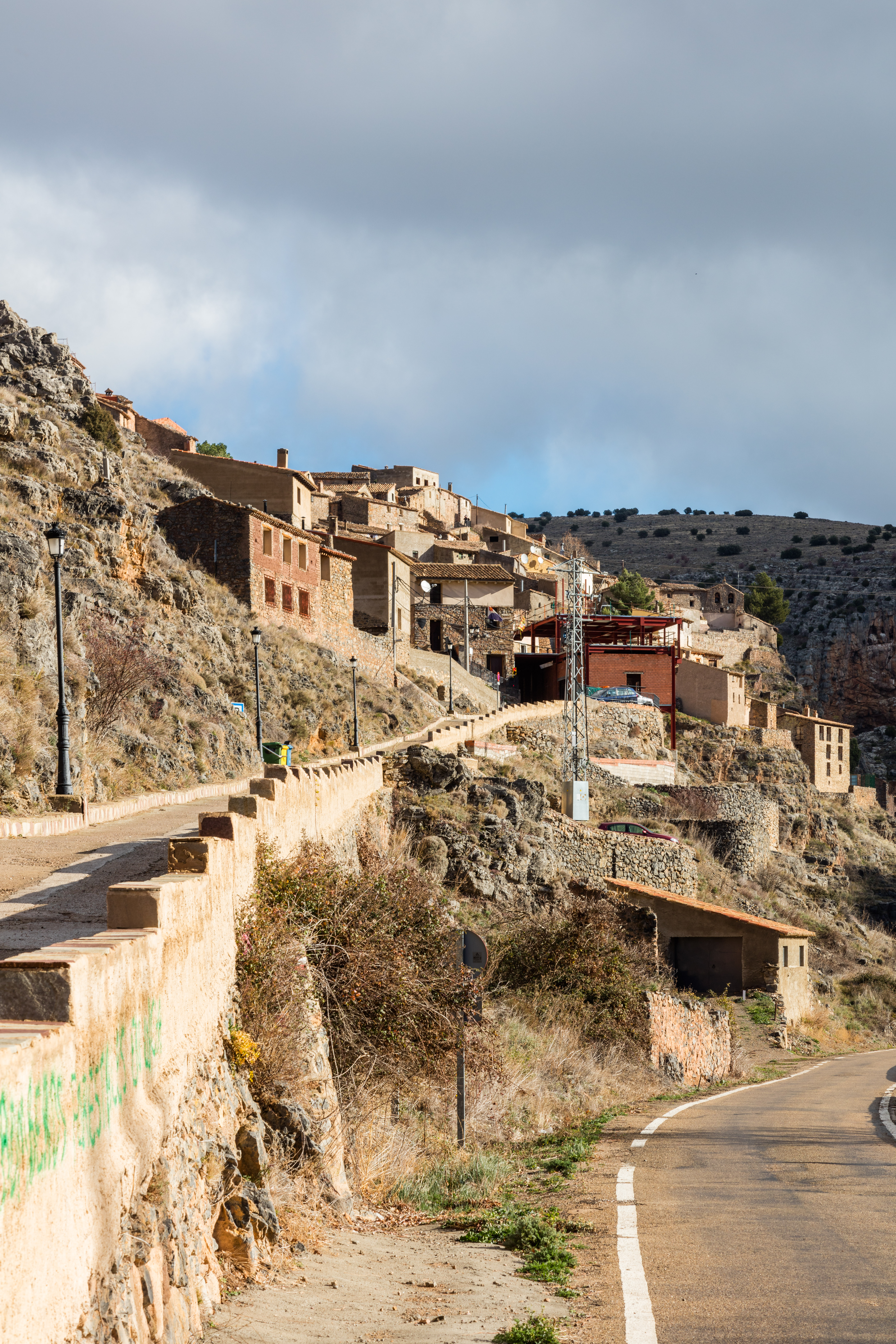

- Flag Coat of arms
- Interactive map of Purujosa
- Coordinates: 41°41′N 1°46′W
- Country: Spain
- Autonomous community: Aragon
- Province: Zaragoza
- Comarca: Aranda

Area
  - Total: 35 km^{2} (14 sq mi)

Population (2025-01-01)
  - Total: 29
  - Density: 0.83/km^{2} (2.1/sq mi)
- Time zone: UTC+1 (CET)
  - Summer (DST): UTC+2 (CEST)

Purujosa is a municipality located in the province of Zaragoza, Aragon, Spain. According to the 2004 census (INE), the municipality has a population of 59 inhabitants.

== See also ==
- List of municipalities in Zaragoza
