= Aranda de Moncayo =

- Municipality
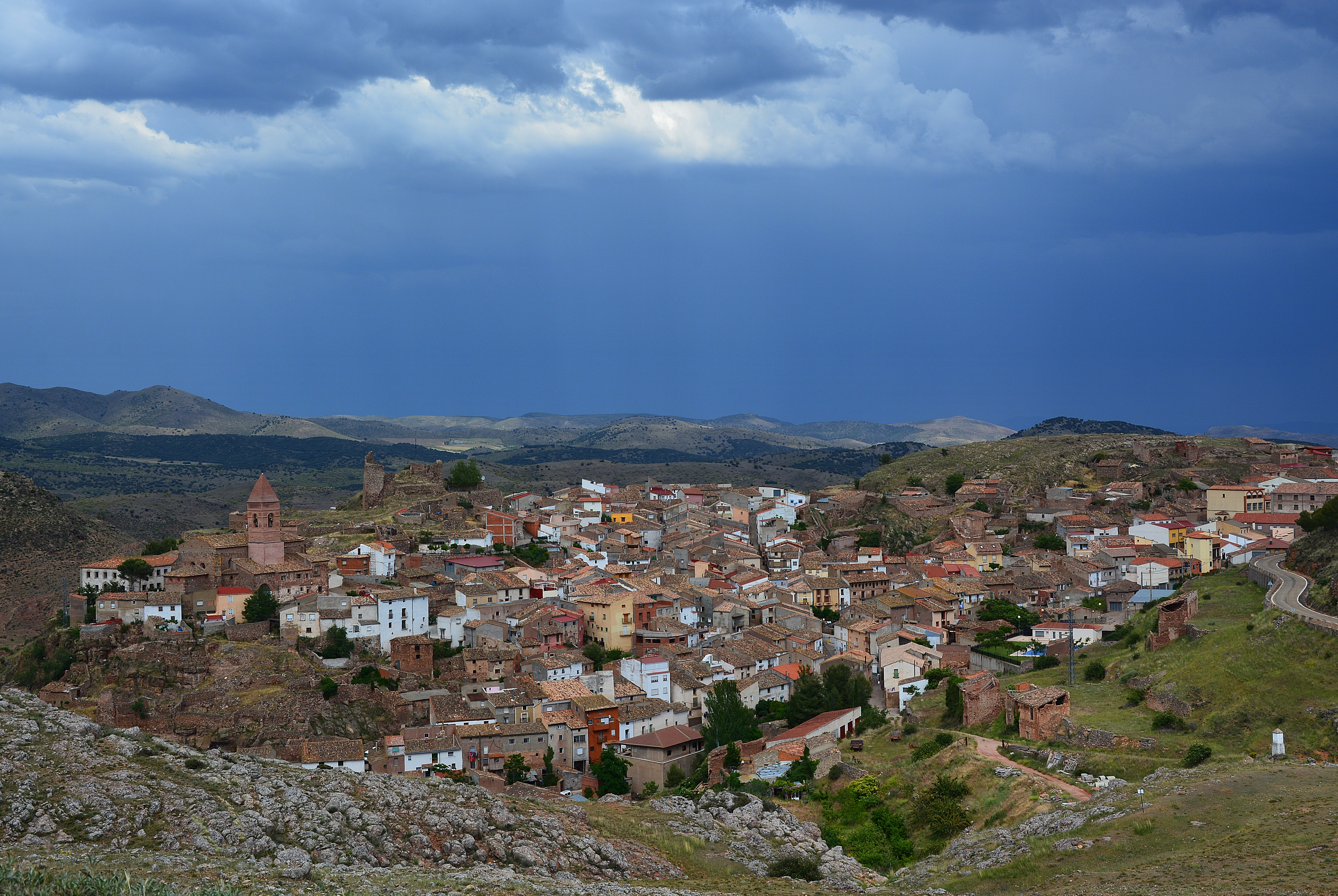

- Flag Coat of arms

- Location of Aranda de Moncayo within Aragon Location of Aranda de Moncayo within Spain
- Coordinates: 41°35′N 1°47′W
- Country: Spain
- Autonomous community: Aragon
- Province: Zaragoza
- Comarca: Aranda

Area
  - Total: 90 km^{2} (35 sq mi)

Population (2025-01-01)
  - Total: 112
  - Density: 1.2/km^{2} (3.2/sq mi)
- (INE)
- Demonyms: Arandino, Arandina ; aratico, aratica
- Time zone: UTC+1 (CET)
  - Summer (DST): UTC+2 (CEST)

Aranda de Moncayo is a municipality located in the province of Zaragoza, Aragon, Spain. According to the 2023 census (INE), the municipality has a population of 129 inhabitants. The municipality is home to the 12th-century Castle of Aranda de Moncayo.

== Demography ==
In the fogaje of 1495, census ordered by Ferdinand II of Aragon, Aranda is listed with 205 "fires" or homes, which is equivalent to about 1025 inhabitants. Already in 1857 census records a population of 1370 inhabitants.

The population of Aranda remained for five centuries above 1000 inhabitants, from the mid-15th century to the mid-20th century, with the exception of the period of the expulsion of the Moors. It reached its greatest demographic weight in Aragon in the 15th century and the largest population in 1910, with 1654 inhabitants.

In the demographic decline of Aranda we can highlight the following facts: expulsion of the Jews, expulsion of the Moors, disentailment of Mendizábal, emigration to America and the 1918 flu, civil war, industrialization of the urban areas, construction of the Maidevera reservoir and crisis of the 21st century.

In application of the Aragonese version of the Alhambra Decree promulgated on March 31, 1492, and signed by King Ferdinand for the Crown of Aragon, the entire Jewish aljama of Aranda was expelled, since none of its members converted to Christianity. They were taken to the port of L'Ampolla where they embarked. Thus the 27 fires of the Sephardic community of Aranda were extinguished.

The Muslim aljama will be expelled in the XVII century, without respecting its conversion of 1525, leaving 140 houses closed and 577 Moors expelled. The attempts of the Count of Aranda to prevent the application of the royal decree in his states were of no avail.

In the 19th century, the ecclesiastical confiscation of Mendizábal led to the exclaustration of the Capuchins and the consequent closure of the convent of San Román, with its classrooms, library, infirmary and conventual church. The abandonment of the convent meant the subsequent ruin and loss of patrimonial and human patrimony. On the civilian side, the nationalization of the municipality's own property deprived the municipality of income obtained from its numerous forests, which passed into private hands or to the State. The neighbors lost these communal lands where sheep, goats and pigs were grazed, charcoal was made and firewood was obtained for homes.

In the second decade of the 20th century, there was a decrease in the young population due to emigration to America or their transfer to Barcelona and the mortality caused by the flu of 1918 that struck with intensity.

During the last Civil War, there were numerous reprisals that followed the formation of the column in defense of the Republic that disarmed the Civil Guard from the Jarque de Moncayo barracks.

In the 1950s, 1960s, and 1970s, entire families moved to Barcelona and Zaragoza, mainly attracted by the industrialization process.

In 1979 construction work began on the Maidevera reservoir, which was completed in 1981. Two years later it was put into operation, flooding part of the huerta of Aranda and consequently reducing the economy of the municipality by the gradual abandonment of agricultural and livestock farms.

In the 21st century, the 2008 financial crisis, as well as the crisis of the footwear sector in the municipalities of Illueca and Brea, located 17 km away, where several tens of Arandinos were employed. Most of them moved to Ólvega, 38 km away, which meant, over time, their settlement in that Castilian town.

With the data recorded in the municipal census as of January 1, 2023, the population by right has been reduced to 127 inhabitants, which is 8% of what it was in 1910. This circumstance is mitigated by the maintenance of second homes.

== See also ==
- List of municipalities in Zaragoza
