= Lââm =

French singer (born 1971)

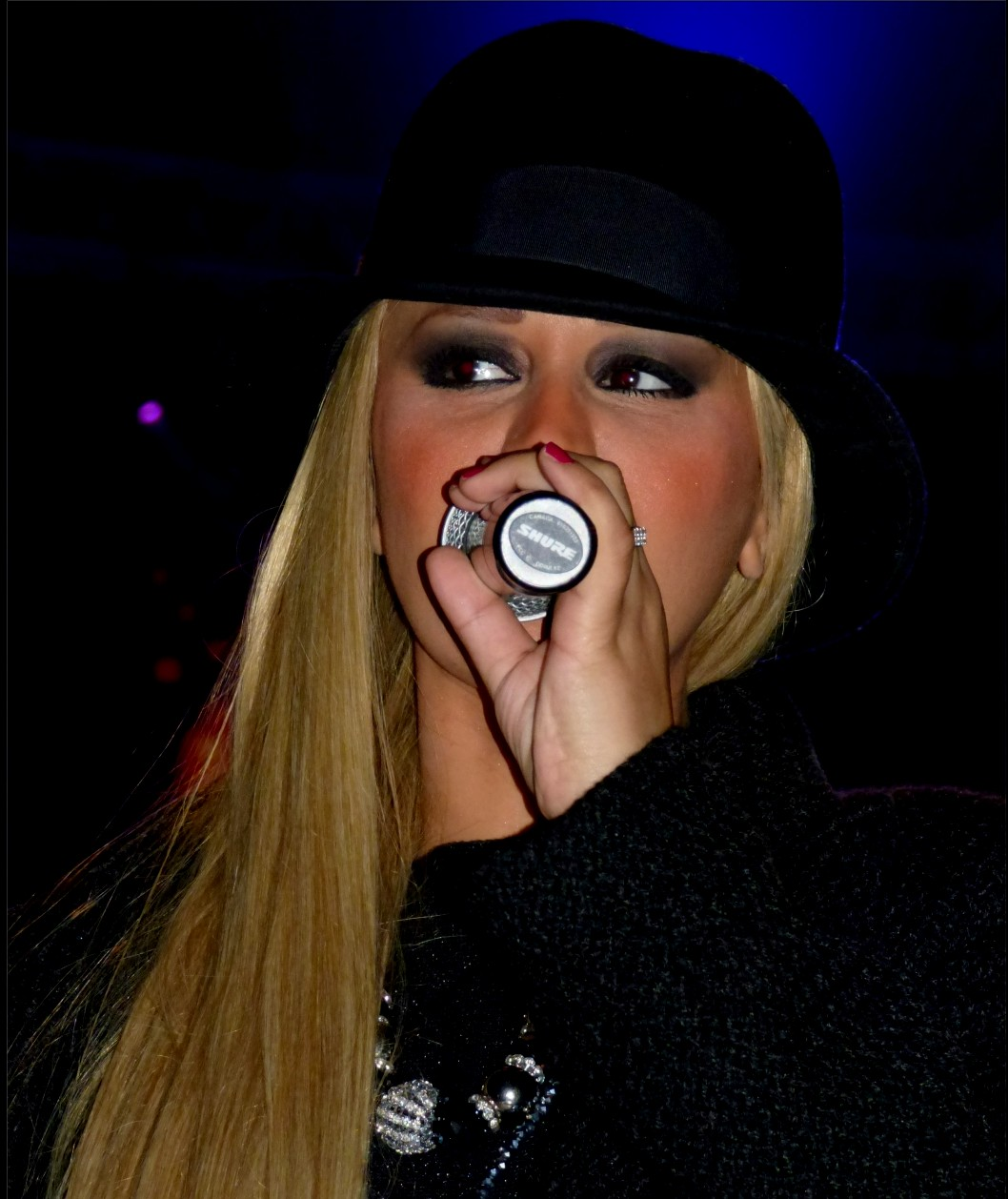
- Lââm in 2013

Background information
- Born: Lamia Naoui; 1 September 1971 (age 54)
- Origin: Paris, France
- Genres: Pop; R&B; soul; hip hop
- Occupation: singer
- Years active: 1998 – 2011
- Labels: Heben Music, Odeon, Sony/BMG
- Website: www.laam.net

Lamia Naoui (born 1 September 1971), known professionally as Lââm, is a French singer of Tunisian descent. She has sold more than 4,000,000 singles & albums.

== Biography ==
Lââm was born in Paris, and had family problems during childhood. At a very young age, she developed a passion for music.

A producer commented on her singing and the way she interpreted songs; thus Lââm's career began. She released her first single "Chanter pour ceux qui sont loin de chez eux", which was a reprise of Michel Berger's song. The French public bought 960,000 copies of the song (gold disc certification). The song ranked second on the Top 50 for nine weeks. Lââm released her first album Persévérance which contained additional versions of Michel Berger's songs, as well as "Jamais loin de toi", "Assez", "Les enfants de l'an 2000" and the encore "Face à Face".

In 2001, she released her second album Une vie ne suffit pas and reached gold certification with more than 100,000 copies sold. The album spawned two hit singles: "Que l'amour nous garde" and "De ton indifférence". In 2002, Lââm performed a huge concert/tour at Paris Olympia. During that time, Lââm also performed in the musical comedy Cindy. The musical comedy was not considered successful despite the official single leading the album to reach gold status in record sales with more than 100,000 copies sold. The single, interpreted by Lââm and Frank Sherbourne was placed fifth in the Top 50.

In 2004, Lââm released an album showcasing a broader sampling of musical genres than previous work. In its production, a variety of sounds were used including rock, contemporary R&B and rap music, as well as several duets with (Jean-Jacques Goldman, Lisa Stansfield, Princess Aniès...). The album contained two singles written and composed by Jean-Jacques Goldman: "Tu es d'un chemin" and "On pardonne". Both Goldman songs aired on radio but were short lived. Promotion was not up to par and thus no more than 25,000 copies were sold. Lââm also began another French tour which included dates in Pairs au Zèbre de Belleville.

In August 2005, the single, "Petite Sœur" was released. It was infused with an R&B rhythm and the song went to fifth on the charts with more than 250,000 copies sold. Lââm was returning to her previous level of popularity and was invited to a great number of shows to perform the single. In September of that same year, her album was republished under the name Pour être libre; it included three new songs: "Petite Sœur", "Pour être libre" and "Elle est toujours là". Within a year, the album was ranked high in the French charts and was certified gold having sold more than 75,000 copies.

In 2006, she received many nominations at the NRJ Music Awards as the French-speaking artist of the year and at the Victoires de la musique as female artist of the year against such artists as Keren Ann, Zazie and Juliette. Despite ultimately not winning, the nominations showed Lââm had not been forgotten and that the public loved her songs. She later organized a huge tour in the summer which passed through a number of cities in France (like Perpignan and Amiens) and Belgium.

Lââm released a new album at the end of 2006. The CD preceded the single "Le sang chaud", which is a duet with the singer Princesse Aniès. The single sold more than 50,000 copies, and ranked seventh on the Top 50. Despite the single's success, the album Le Sang chaud fared much lower on the charts with no more than 15,000 copies sold.

Despite Lââm's disappointment in the album's success, she was chosen "Voice of the Year" by the public of FilleTV channel. The award is the first in Lââm's career.

In March 2007, she released the single "Rien ne dure", which aired on radio. The CD is yet to be released. In May 2007, Lââm released a follow-up single, "Relève-toi". It is available on legal downloads.

Lââm is a participant in the album High School Musical 2, with her interpretation of the song "Savoir qui je suis" (Gotta go my own way).

== Discography ==
=== Albums ===
- 1999 Persévérance
- 2001 Une vie ne suffit pas
- 2003 Face à face
- 2004 Lââm
- 2005 Pour être libre
- 2006 Le sang chaud
- 2011 Au coeur des hommes

=== Compilations ===
- 2009 On a tous quelque chose de Lââm (Best-of)

=== Singles ===
- 1998 "Chanter pour ceux qui sont loin de chez eux" (Michel Berger) cover (#2)
- 1999 "Jamais loin de toi" (#4)
- 1999 "Assez!" (#51)
- 2000 "Les enfants de l'an 2000" (#3)
- 2000 "Face à face" (#83)
- 2001 "Que l'amour nous garde" (#20)
- 2001 "De ton indifférence" (#29)
- 2002 "Mon vieux"
- 2004 "On pardonne"
- 2004 "Tu es d'un chemin"
- 2005 "Petite sœur" (#2)
- 2006 "Pour être libre" (#17)
- 2006 "Le sang chaud" (#7)
- 2007 "Rien ne dure"
- 2007 "Relève-toi"
- 2007 "Savoir qui je suis"
- 2007 "High School Musical 2 Europe"
- 2008 "Ta voix (The Calling)" (Duet with Jennifer Paige) (#37)
- 2009 "L'amour restera" (Piero Battery feat Lââm)
