= Jarque =

Jarque de Moncayo
- Municipality
- Flag Coat of arms

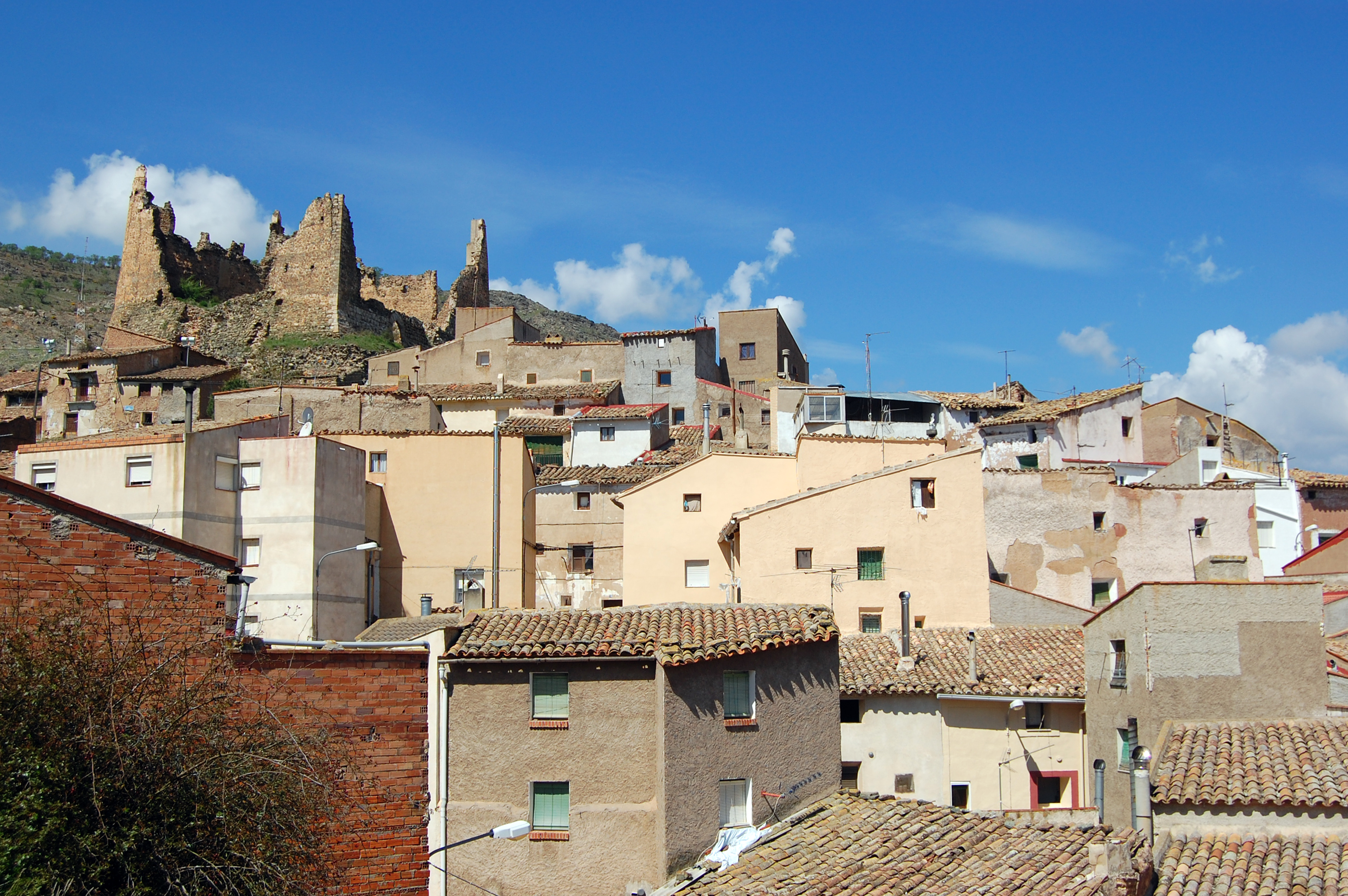

- Location of Jarque de Moncayo within Aragon Location of Jarque de Moncayo within Spain Jarque de Moncayo (Europe)
- Coordinates: 41°34′N 1°40′W
- Country: Spain
- Autonomous community: Aragon
- Province: Zaragoza
- Comarca: Aranda

Area
  - Total: 43 km^{2} (17 sq mi)

Population (2025-01-01)
  - Total: 373
  - Density: 8.7/km^{2} (22/sq mi)
- (INE)
- Demonym(s): Jarquino, Jarquina
- Time zone: UTC+1 (CET)
  - Summer (DST): UTC+2 (CEST)

Jarque is a municipality located in the Aranda Comarca province of Zaragoza, Aragon, Spain. According to the 2004 census (INE), the municipality has a population of 556 inhabitants.

The town is also known as Jarque de Moncayo, despite its location at the feet of the Sierra de la Virgen, another range of the Iberian System. The Moncayo Massif is visible in the distance to the north of the town.

== See also ==
- List of municipalities in Zaragoza
