= Petite Sœur (song) =

Single by Lââm

from the album Pour être libre
- Language: French
- Released: August 15, 2005
- Length: 3:50
- Label: Heben (Sony BMG)
- Composers: Laura Marciano, Michel Godebama
- Producers: FB Cool, SDO

Lââm singles chronology
"Tu est d'un chemin" (2004)	"Petite Sœur" (2005)	"Pour être libre" (2006)

Audio
- "Petite Sœur" on YouTube

"Petite Sœur" is a song by French singer Lââm, originally released as a single on 15 August 2005. It was the lead single from her studio album Pour être libre, published six weeks later.

The single debuted at number five in France, eventually, eight weeks later, climbing to its peak position of number two.

== Composition and recording ==
The song was written by Godebama and Laura Marciano and produced by FB Cool and SDO.

== Track listings ==
CD single (Heben 82876695762)

1. "Petite sœur" (3:50)
2. "Jamais loin de toi" (Version Acoustique) (2:42)
3. "Tu es d'un chemin" (World Mix) (3:23)
4. "Petite sœur" (Instru) (3:45)

Extras:

- "Petite sœur" (Video)

== Charts ==
=== Weekly charts ===
Weekly chart performance for "Petite Sœur"
Chart (2005–06)	Peak position
Belgium (Ultratop 50 Wallonia)	1
CIS Airplay (TopHit)	23
France (SNEP)	2
Russia Airplay (TopHit)	16
Switzerland (Schweizer Hitparade)	17

=== Year-end charts ===
2005 year-end chart performance for "Petite Sœur"
Chart (2005)	Position
Russia Airplay (TopHit)	180

2006 year-end chart performance for "Petite Sœur"
Chart (2006)	Position
CIS (TopHit)	25
Russia Airplay (TopHit)	28

=== Decade-end charts ===
Decade-end chart performance for "Petite Sœur"
Chart (2000–2009)	Position
Russia Airplay (TopHit)	137

== Certifications ==
Region	Certification	Certified units/sales
France (SNEP)	Gold	200,000^{*}
^{*} Sales figures based on certification alone.

== Awards and nominations ==
- 2006 NRJ Music Awards — Nominated for the Francophone Song of the Year
