= Trasobares =

Coordinates: 41°38′N 1°38′W

- municipality
- Coat of arms
- Interactive map of Trasobares
- Country: Spain
- Autonomous community: Aragon
- Province: Zaragoza

Area
  - Total: 71 km^{2} (27 sq mi)

Population (2025-01-01)
  - Total: 124
  - Density: 1.7/km^{2} (4.5/sq mi)
- Time zone: UTC+1 (CET)
  - Summer (DST): UTC+2 (CEST)

Trasobares is a municipality located in the Aranda Comarca, province of Zaragoza, Aragon, Spain. According to the 2004 census (INE), the municipality had a population of 183 inhabitants.

The town is in the South West of the Moncayo Massif.

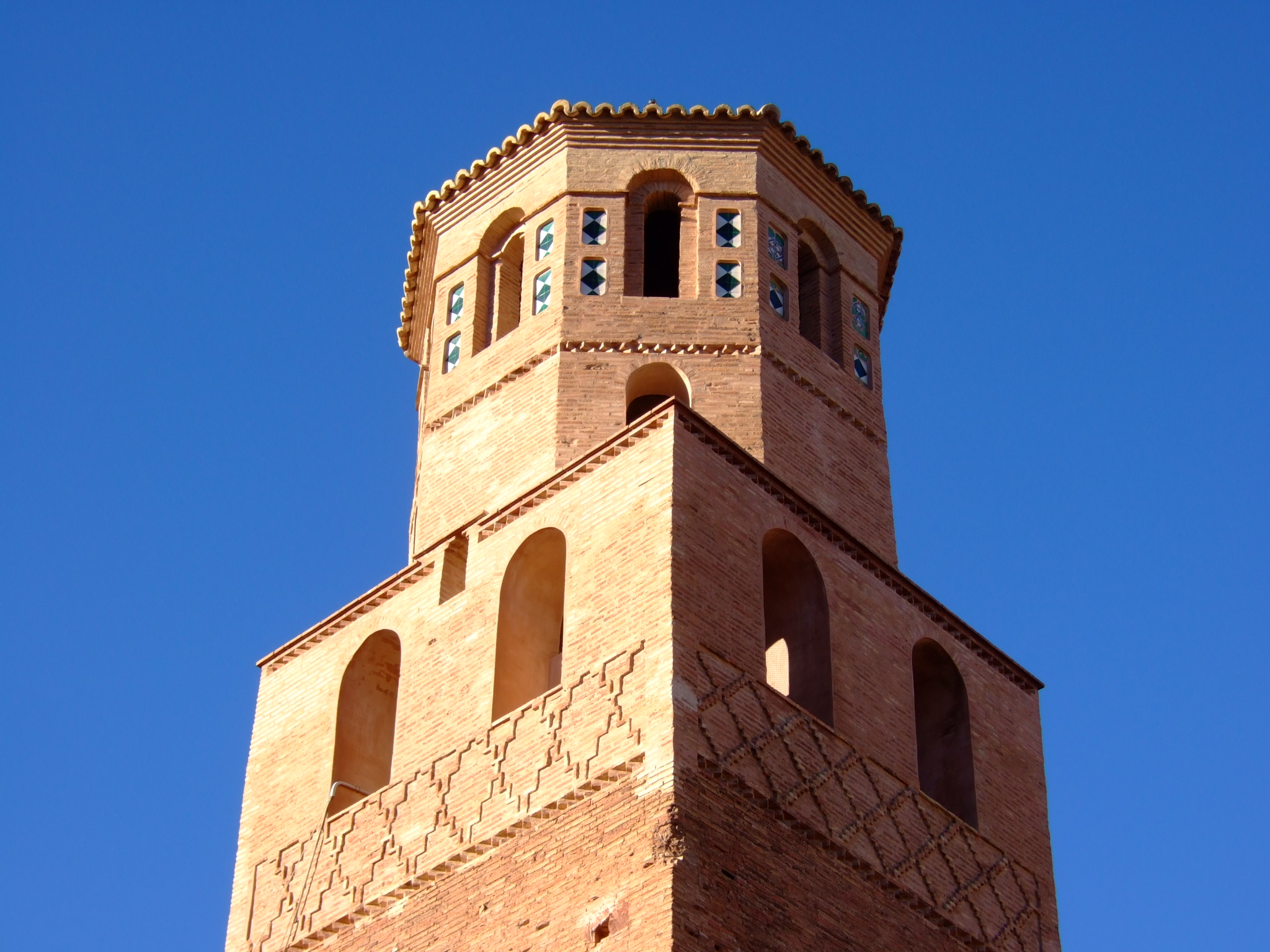
Trasobares church tower

== See also ==
- List of municipalities in Zaragoza
