= Friends for Life (Montserrat Caballé album) =

Studio album by Montserrat Caballé
- Released: 3 April 1997
- Length: 69:39
- Label: BMG
- Producer: Mike Moran

Friends for Life is a 1997 album by Catalan opera singer Montserrat Caballé.

== Track listing ==
1. "Bohemian Rhapsody", with Bruce Dickinson (Freddie Mercury) – 5:50
2. "March with Me", with Vangelis (Vangelis/M. Caballé) – 3:49
3. "Visions of Glory", with Johnny Logan (Bernd Budden/N. Hydefeld/J. Logan/J. Fritz) – 3:50
4. "Ci vorrebbe il mare", with Marco Masini (Giancarlo Bigazzi) – 4:38
5. "Chanter pour ceux qui sont loin de chez eux", with Johnny Hallyday (Michel Berger) – 4:27
6. "One Life, One Soul", with Gotthard (von Rohr/Leoni/Lee) – 3:58
7. "A Rose in December", with Gino Vannelli (Gino Vannelli/B.C. Hamilton) – 4:26
8. "Sailing", with Khadja Nin (Gavin Sutherland) – 4:39
9. "Mi amiga Rigoberta", with Carlos Cano (Carlos Cano) – 4:24
10. "Had to Be", with Helmut Lotti (John Farrar/Tim Rice) – 4:09
11. "Friends Again", with Lisa Nilsson (Mauro Scocco) – 4:19
12. "Out of the Blue", with René Froger (Eric van Tijn/J. Fluitsma) – 3:55
13. "Love Is the Key", with Die Prinzen (S. Krumbiegel/T. Kunzel/W. Lenk) – 4:41
14. "Like a Dream", with Vangelis (Vangelis/M. Caballé) – 3:24
15. "Put the Weight on My Shoulders", with Gino Vannelli (Gino Vannelli) – 4:49
16. "Barcelona", with Freddie Mercury – 4:28

== Charts ==
Chart performance for Friends for Life
Chart (1997)	Peak position
Belgian Albums (Ultratop Flanders)	6
Belgian Albums (Ultratop Wallonia)	33
German Albums (Offizielle Top 100)	54
Swiss Albums (Schweizer Hitparade)	17
