= Francisco Aranda Millán =

Spanish zoologist

Francisco Aranda Millán (14 October 1881, in Villarroya de la Sierra – 20 July 1937) was a Spanish zoologist. He was executed during the Spanish Civil War by a fascist squadron in Valdemorillo. He was the father of film critic and surrealist author José Francisco Aranda García (1925-1989).
