= Gotor =

- Municipality
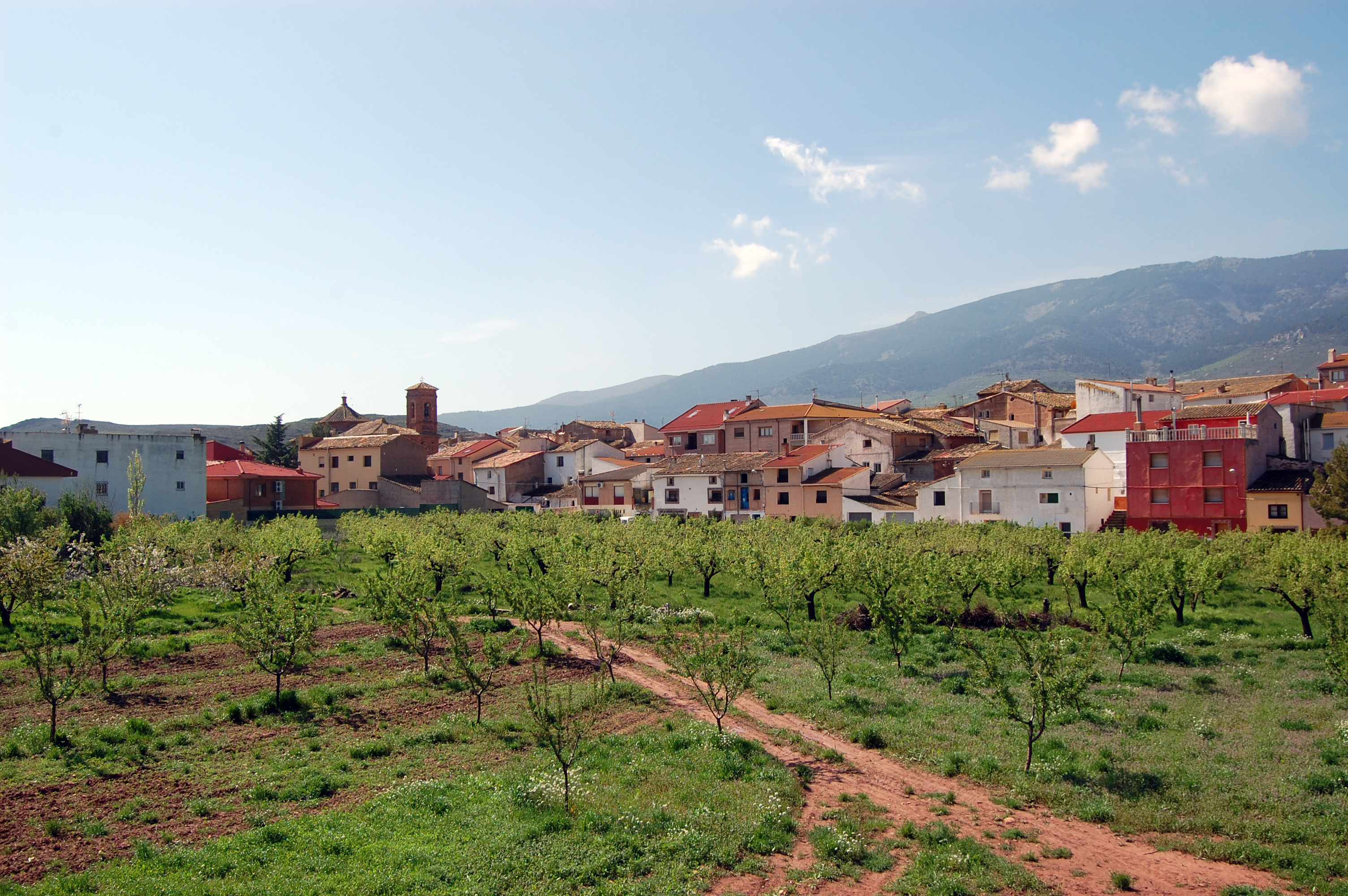
- View of Gotor with the Sierra de la Virgen in the background

- Flag Coat of arms

- Location of Gotor within Aragon Location of Gotor within Spain Gotor (Europe)
- Coordinates: 41°33′N 1°39′W
- Country: Spain
- Autonomous community: Aragon
- Province: Zaragoza
- Comarca: Aranda

Area
  - Total: 15 km^{2} (5.8 sq mi)

Population (2025-01-01)
  - Total: 309
  - Density: 21/km^{2} (53/sq mi)
- (INE)
- Demonym(s): Gotorino, Gotorina
- Time zone: UTC+1 (CET)
  - Summer (DST): UTC+2 (CEST)

Gotor is a municipality located in the Aranda Comarca province of Zaragoza, Aragon, Spain. According to the 2004 census (INE), the municipality has a population of 389 inhabitants.

== See also ==
- List of municipalities in Zaragoza
