= Tierga =

- Municipality
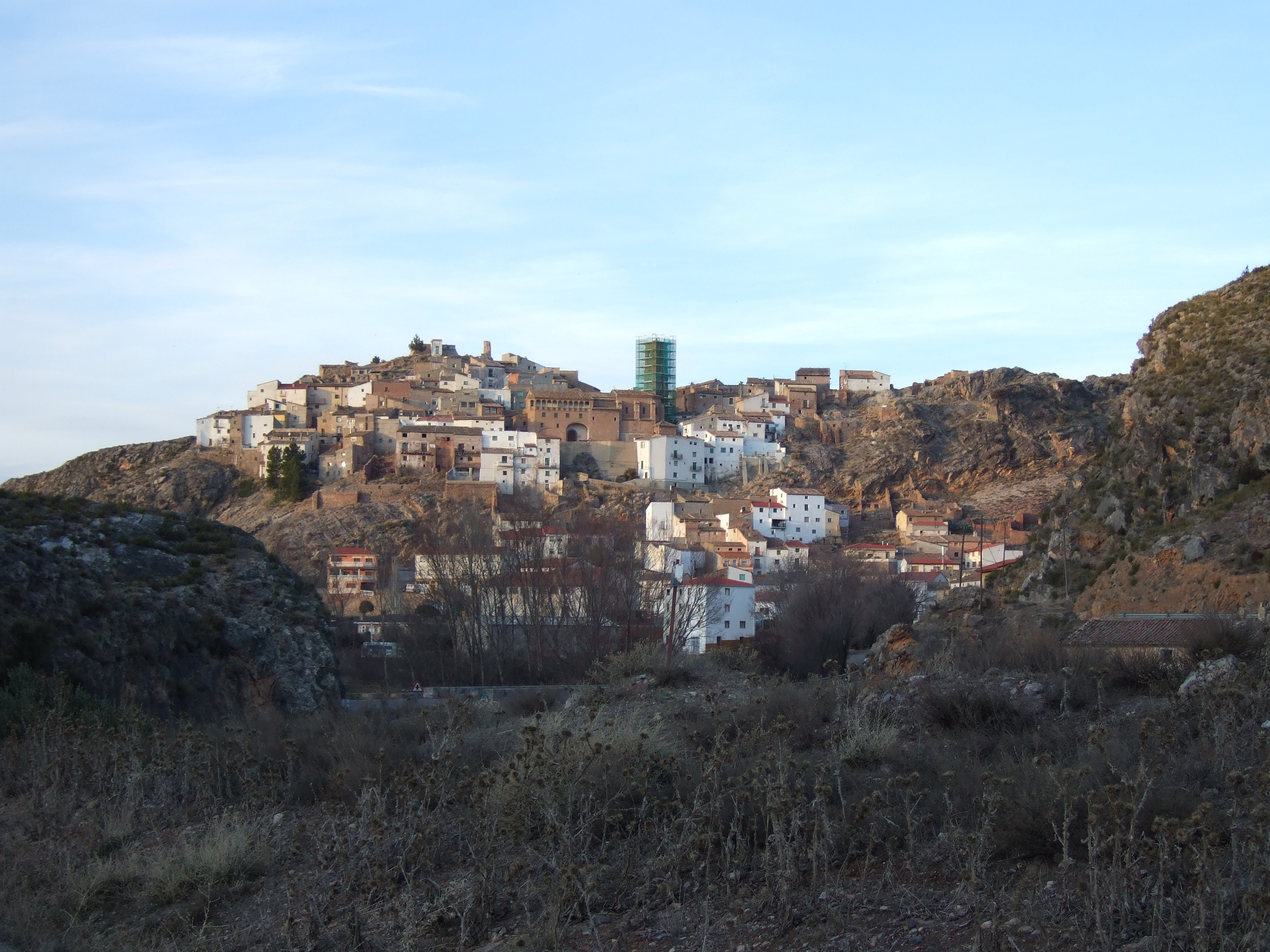
- View of Tierga

- Coat of arms
- Interactive map of Tierga
- Coordinates: 41°37′N 01°36′W
- Country: Spain
- Autonomous community: Aragon
- Province: Zaragoza
- Comarca: Aranda

Area
  - Total: 65 km^{2} (25 sq mi)

Population (2025-01-01)
  - Total: 170
  - Density: 2.6/km^{2} (6.8/sq mi)
- Time zone: UTC+1 (CET)
  - Summer (DST): UTC+2 (CEST)

Tierga is a municipality located in the province of Zaragoza, Aragon, Spain. According to the 2004 census (INE), the municipality has a population of 221 inhabitants.

== See also ==
- Aranda (comarca)
- List of municipalities in Zaragoza
