= Castle of Aranda de Moncayo =

12th-century fortress in Spain

Coordinates: 41°34′43.9″N 1°47′29″W

Castle of Amer
- Aranda de Moncayo, Zaragosa
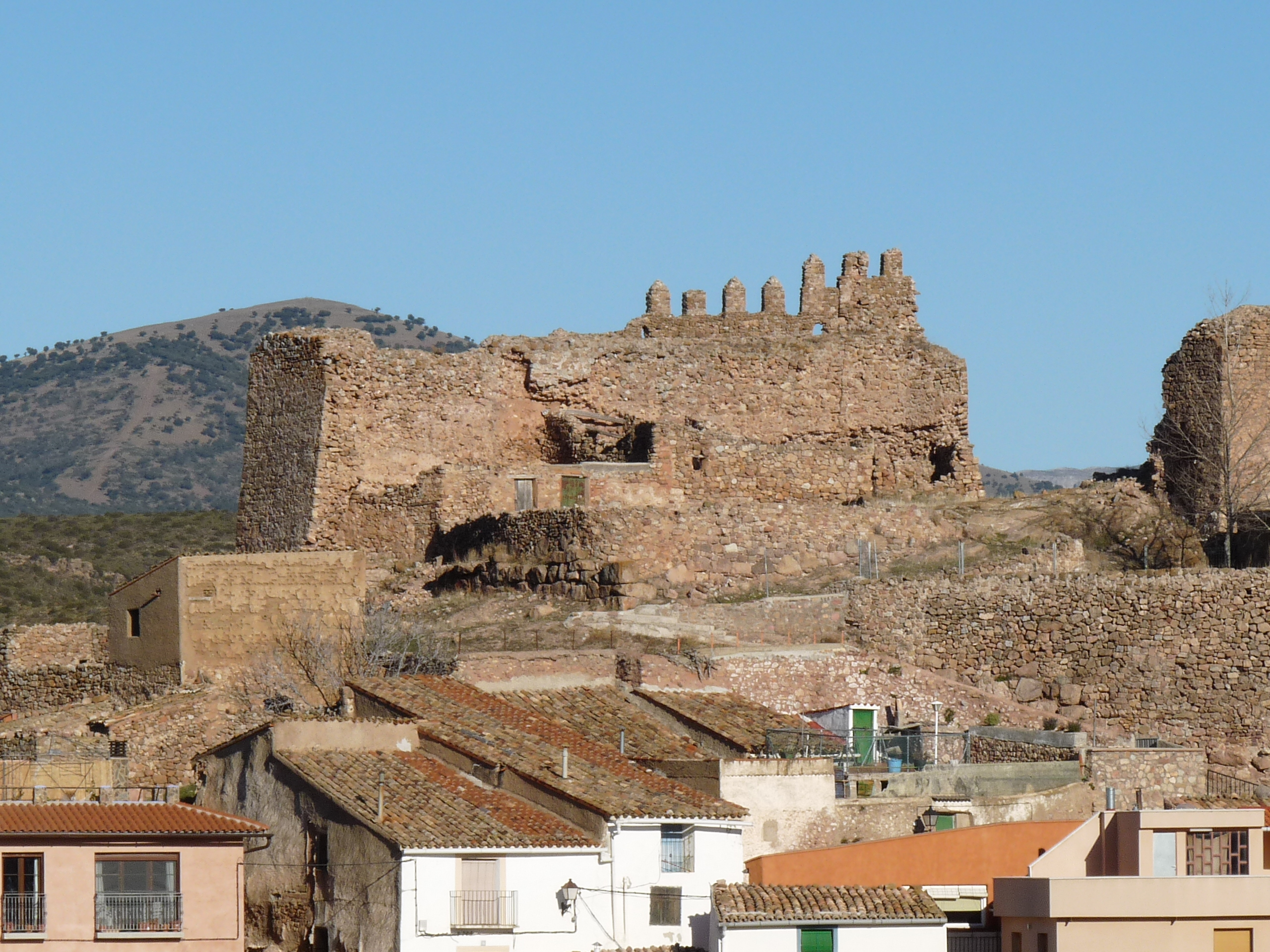

Site information
- Type: Fortification
- Condition: Protected site

Site history
- Built: 12th century
- Materials: Stone

The Castle of Aranda de Moncayo (Spanish: Castillo de Aranda de Moncayo) is a 12th-century fortress located in Aranda de Moncayo, Spain. The castle is considered a Bien de Interés Cultural site.

== History ==
The castle at Aranda de Moncayo occupies a strategic hilltop from which the surrounding terrain can be viewed. The current castle was built by a Muslim emirate in the 12th century during the early centuries of the Reconquista, and retained its importance due to tensions between Castile (which captured the fortress in 1363) and Aragon in the 14th century. From 1366 the castle was under the control of Order of Sant Jordi d'Alfama, and in 1373 the castle was granted to the noble family of Toda de Luna.
