= Villarroya de la Sierra =

- municipality
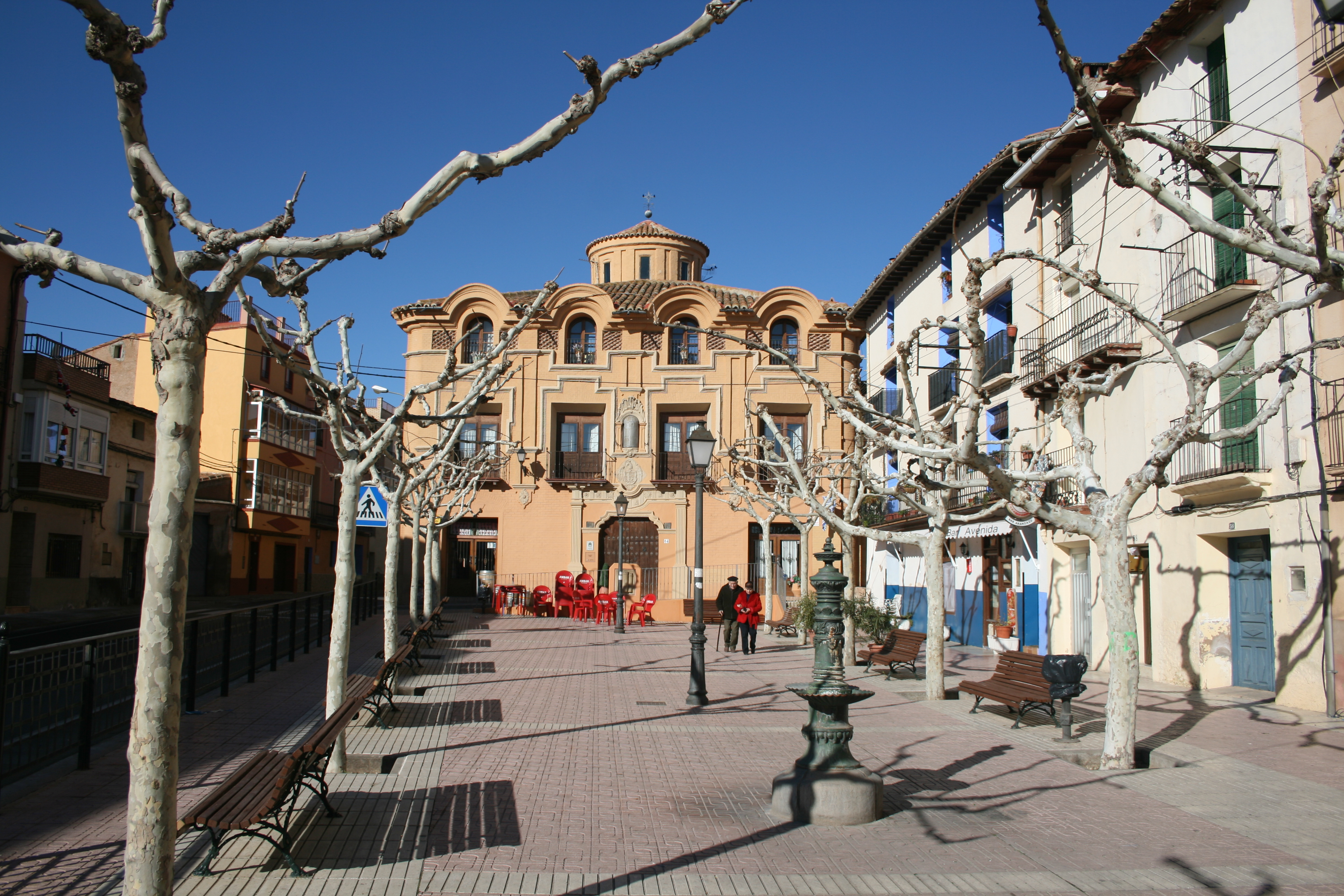

- Coat of arms

- Location within Aragon Location within Spain Location within Europe
- Country: Spain
- Autonomous community: Aragon
- Province: Zaragoza

Area
  - Total: 91 km^{2} (35 sq mi)

Population (2025-01-01)
  - Total: 397
  - Density: 4.4/km^{2} (11/sq mi)
- Time zone: UTC+1 (CET)
  - Summer (DST): UTC+2 (CEST)

Villarroya de la Sierra is a municipality in the Province of Zaragoza, Aragon, Spain. According to the 2004 census (INE), the municipality has a population of 622 inhabitants.

The town is located in the Sierra de la Virgen range.

== Notable people ==
- Francisco Aranda Millán (1881–1937), Spanish zoologist

== See also ==
- List of municipalities in Zaragoza
