= Sestrica =

Coordinates: 41°29′N 1°36′W

- municipality
- Flag Coat of arms
- Interactive map of Sestrica
- Country: Spain
- Autonomous community: Aragon
- Province: Zaragoza

Area
  - Total: 40 km^{2} (15 sq mi)
- Elevation: 532 m (1,745 ft)

Population (2025-01-01)
  - Total: 329
  - Density: 8.2/km^{2} (21/sq mi)
- Time zone: UTC+1 (CET)
  - Summer (DST): UTC+2 (CEST)

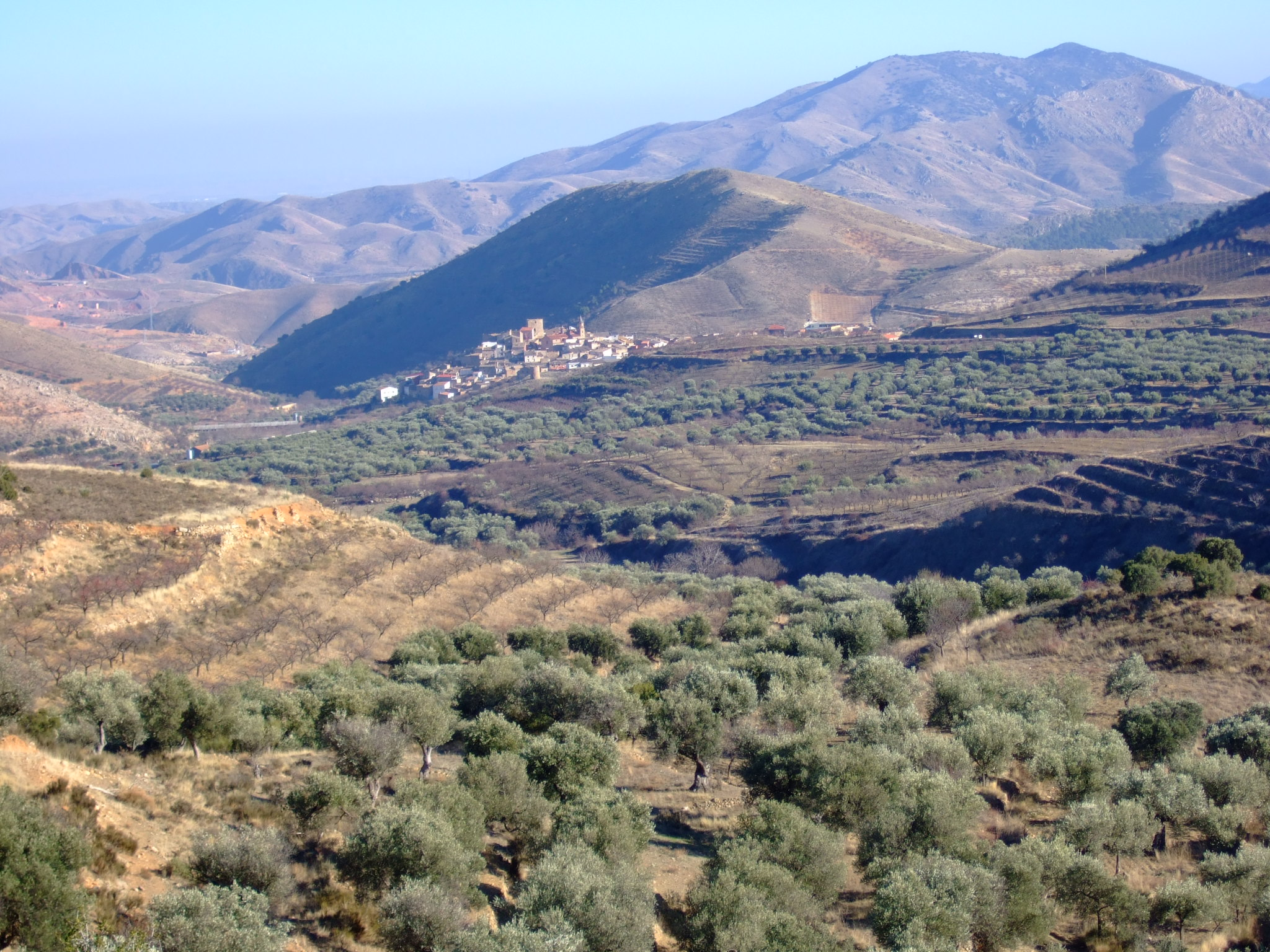
View of Sestrica

Sestrica is a municipality located in the province of Zaragoza, Aragon, Spain. According to the 2004 census (INE), the municipality has a population of 460 inhabitants.

The Sierra de la Virgen rises above the town.

== Villages ==
- Viver de la Sierra

== See also ==
- List of municipalities in Zaragoza
