= Illueca =

- municipality
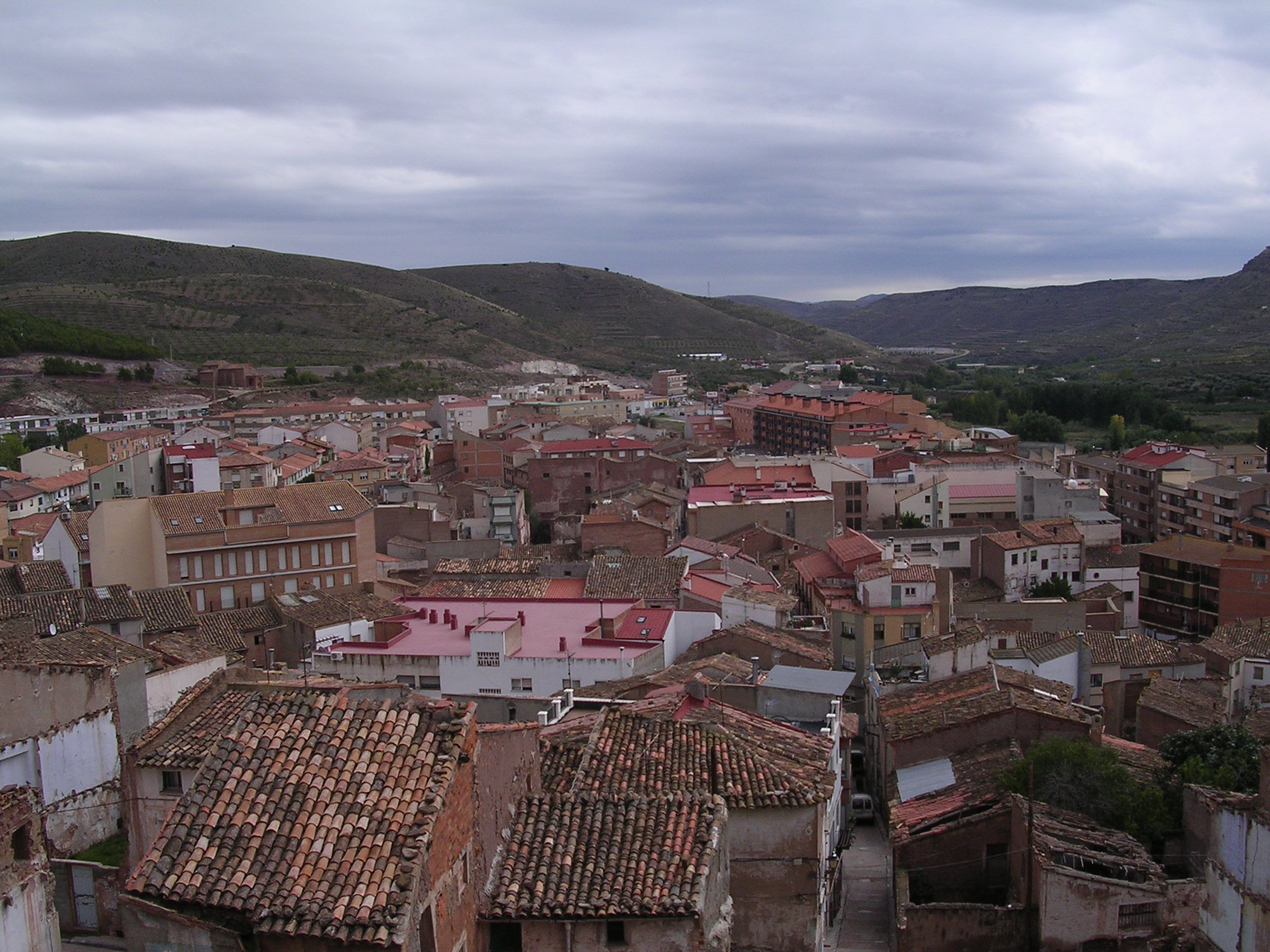
- Illueca as seen from Antipope Benedict XIII's castle

- Coat of arms

- Location of Illueca within Aragon Location of Illueca within Spain Illueca (Europe)
- Coordinates: 41°32′N 1°37′W
- Country: Spain
- Autonomous community: Aragon
- Province: Zaragoza
- Comarca: Aranda

Area
  - Total: 24 km^{2} (9.3 sq mi)

Population (2025-01-01)
  - Total: 2,782
  - Density: 120/km^{2} (300/sq mi)
- (INE)
- Demonym(s): Illuecano, Illuecana
- Time zone: UTC+1 (CET)
  - Summer (DST): UTC+2 (CEST)

Illueca is a municipality located in the province of Zaragoza, Aragon, Spain. According to the 2004 census (INE), the municipality has a population of 3,396 inhabitants.

Antipope Benedict XIII was born and later buried here.

== See also ==
- List of municipalities in Zaragoza
