= Pour être libre (album) =

Studio album by Lââm
- Released: September 26, 2005
- Label: Heben (Sony BMG)

Lââm chronology
| Lââm (2004) | Pour être libre (2005) | Le sang chaud (2006) |

Singles from Pour être libre
- 1. "Petite Sœur" Released: 15 August 2005; 2. "Pour être libre" Released: 17 February 2006

Pour être libre is a studio album by French singer Lââm, released on 26 September 2005.

It was a re-edition of Lââm's 2004 self-titled album. Some songs were left out, and some new songs ("Petite Sœur", "Pour être libre" and "Elle est toujours là") were added. The track order was also different.

"Petite Sœur" was released as a single six weeks prior to the album, on 15 August 2005, and "Pour être libre" was released as a single on 17 February 2006.

== Reception ==
The album debuted at number 50 in France for the week of 1 October 2005, eventually climbing to its peak position of number 15 in March of the next year.

== Track listing ==
CD
| No. | Title | Length |
|---|---|---|
| 1. | "Je ne suis pas d'ici" | 3:44 |
| 2. | "Pour être libre" | 3:52 |
| 3. | "Petite sœur" | 3:48 |
| 4. | "On se ressemble" | 4:05 |
| 5. | "Enfants du monde" | 3:10 |
| 6. | "Elle est toujours là" | 3:51 |
| 7. | "Problème d'identité" | 4:04 |
| 8. | "Si les femmes menaient le monde" | 4:52 |
| 9. | "Breathe In Breathe Out (L'amour reviendra)" (with Lisa Stansfield) | 4:22 |
| 10. | "Fais de moi ce que tu veux" | 5:18 |
| 11. | "Ce n'est que pour toi" | 4:41 |
| 12. | "Tu es d'un chemin" | 3:24 |
| 13. | "On pardonne" | 4:24 |
| 14. | "Ce qui nous mangue de toi" (feat. Jean-Jacques Goldman & Michael Jones) | 3:49 |
| 15. | "Interlude" | 0:42 |
| 16. | "Les fous du volant" (feat. Princess Anies) | 4:13 |
| 17. | "On m'appelle Lââm" | 3:26 |
| 18. | "Love's in the House Tonight" (bonus) | 4:56 |

== Charts ==
| Chart (2005–2006) | Peak position |
|---|---|
| French Albums (SNEP) | 15 |
