= Montserrat Martí =

Spanish opera singer (born 1972)

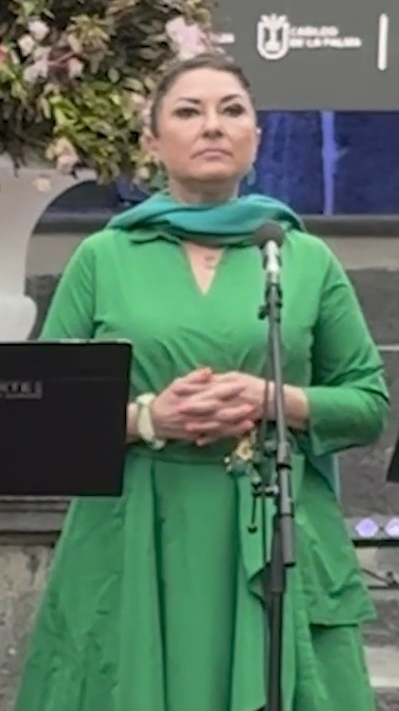
- Martí performing at the 2025 Starmus Festival in Santa Cruz de La Palma
- Born: Montserrat Martínez Caballé; 15 November 1972 (age 53); Barcelona, Catalonia, Spain
- Other name: Montsita Martí
- Occupation: Operatic soprano
- Years active: 1993–present
- Spouse: Carlos de Navas Mir (m. 2006; div. 2007)
- Partner: Daniel Faidella (2009–present)
- Children: 1
- Parents: Bernabé Martí (father); Montserrat Caballé (mother)

Montserrat "Montsita" Martínez Caballé (born 15 November 1972), known as Montserrat Martí or Montsita Martí, is a Spanish operatic soprano.

== Early life ==
Montserrat Martínez Caballé was born in Barcelona on 15 November 1971 to opera singers Montserrat Caballé and Bernabé Martí; she has an older brother, Bernabé Jr. In her early life, Vangelis asked her mother if Martí also sang, prompting them to sing together for the first time; mother and daughter reportedly felt an emotional connection that lasted all their lives.

However, as a young girl Martí had a stronger inclination towards dance, and was selected by Maya Plisetskaya for the Ballet Lírico Nacional around the age of 16; in 1992, an injury forced her to abandon her dancing career.

== Career ==
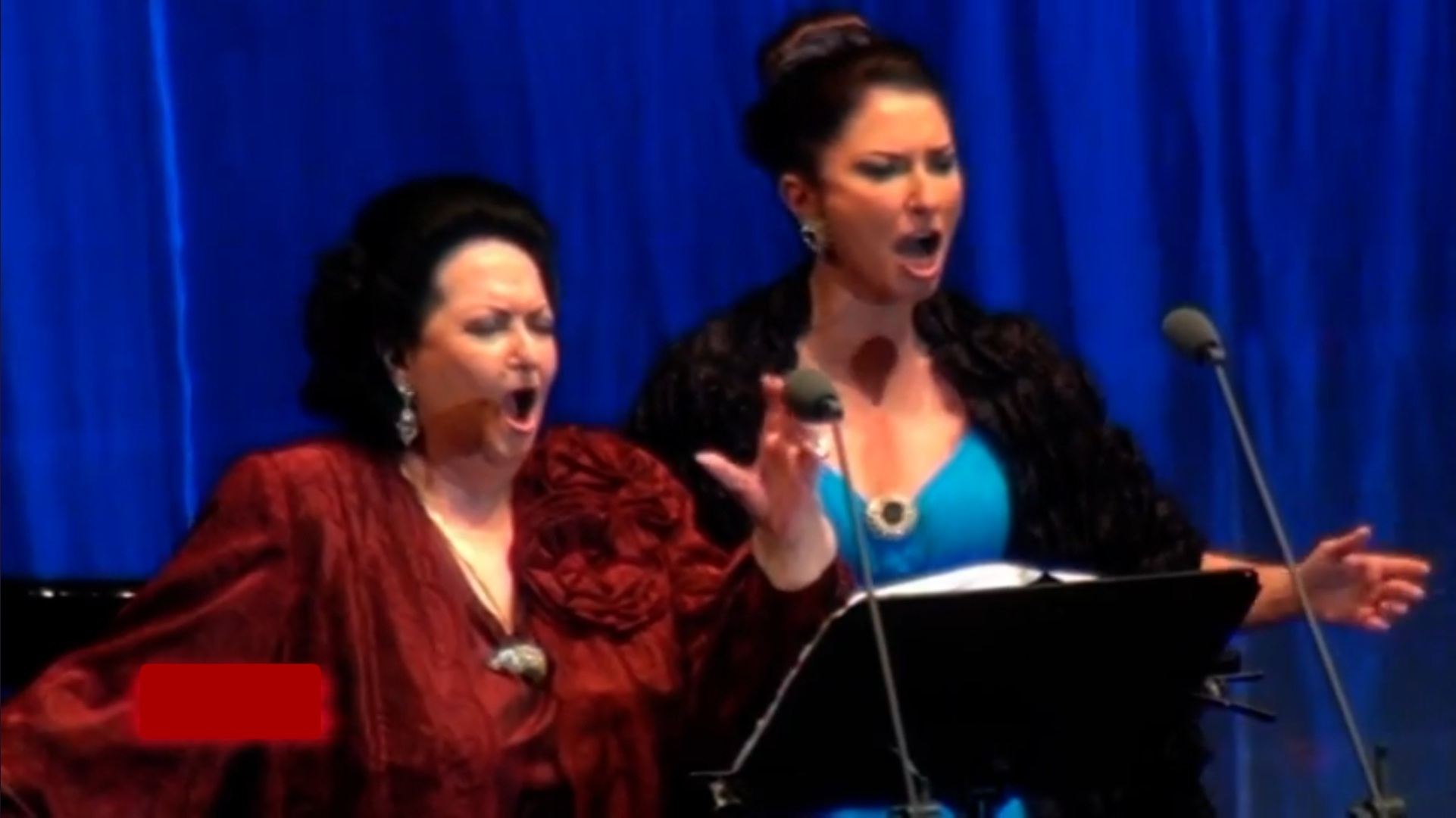
Martí performing with her mother in Marbella, 2012

Martí started her singing training with Isabel Penagos in secret, in order to surprise her parents. She made her first public appearance as a singer in 1993, together with her mother, in London. Following that, mother and daughter sang together on a few occasions both on stage and on recordings. In 1998, she moved to Germany to begin her career in the opera. In the same year, she played the role of Zerlina in Mozart's Don Giovanni at the Hamburg State Opera.

Martí has sung in various classical halls and opera houses worldwide, such as Gran Teatre del Liceu, Palau de la Música Catalana and Teatro Real in Spain; Bolshoi Theatre and Mariinsky Theatre in Russia; Deutsche Oper Berlin, Alte Oper, Musikhalle and Oper der Stadt Köln in Germany; Teatro alla Scala in Italy; Musikverein in Austria; and the Royal Albert Hall in the UK.

Martí's repertoire includes roles in Leonard Bernstein's West Side Story, Federico García Lorca's La casa de Bernarda Alba, Jules Massenet's Cléopâtre and La Vierge; Mozart's Così fan tutte and Don Giovanni; and Puccini's Edgar and Le Villi.

Martí has also collaborated in numerous charity concerts such as one for Rwanda in 1994 and in Prague for children with disabilities under the Olga Havel Foundation.

== Personal life ==
Martí married businessman Carlos de Navas Mir on 14 August 2006. They divorced in October 2007. Since 2009 she has been in a relationship with businessman Daniel Faidella, owner of the Barcelona music club Razzmatazz. They have a daughter, born in 2011.
