= Pour être libre (Lââm song) =

Single by Lââm

from the album Pour être libre
- Language: French
- Released: February 17, 2006
- Length: 3:50
- Label: Heben (Sony BMG)
- Songwriter(s): Géraldine Delacoux, Teetoff
- Producer(s): FB Cool

Lââm singles chronology
"Petite Sœur" (2005)	"Pour être libre" (2006)	"Le sang chaud" (2006)

Music video
- "Pour être libre" on YouTube

"Pour être libre" is a song by French singer Lââm from her 2005 studio album Pour être libre. On 17 February 2006 it was released as a single, which debuted at number 17 in France.

== Composition and recording ==
The song was written by Géraldine Delacoux and Teetoff and produced by FB Cool.

== Track listings ==
CD single (Heben / RCA 82876746072)

1. "Pour être libre" (3:50)
2. "Ce n'est que pour toi" (4:46)
3. "Pour être libre" (Instrumental) (3:50)

Extras:

- "Pour être libre" (Video)

== Charts ==
Chart (2006)	Peak position
Belgium (Ultratop 50 Wallonia)	30
France (SNEP)	17
Switzerland (Schweizer Hitparade)	61
