= Montserrat Caballé =

Spanish operatic soprano (1933–2018)

The Most Excellent Montserrat Caballé
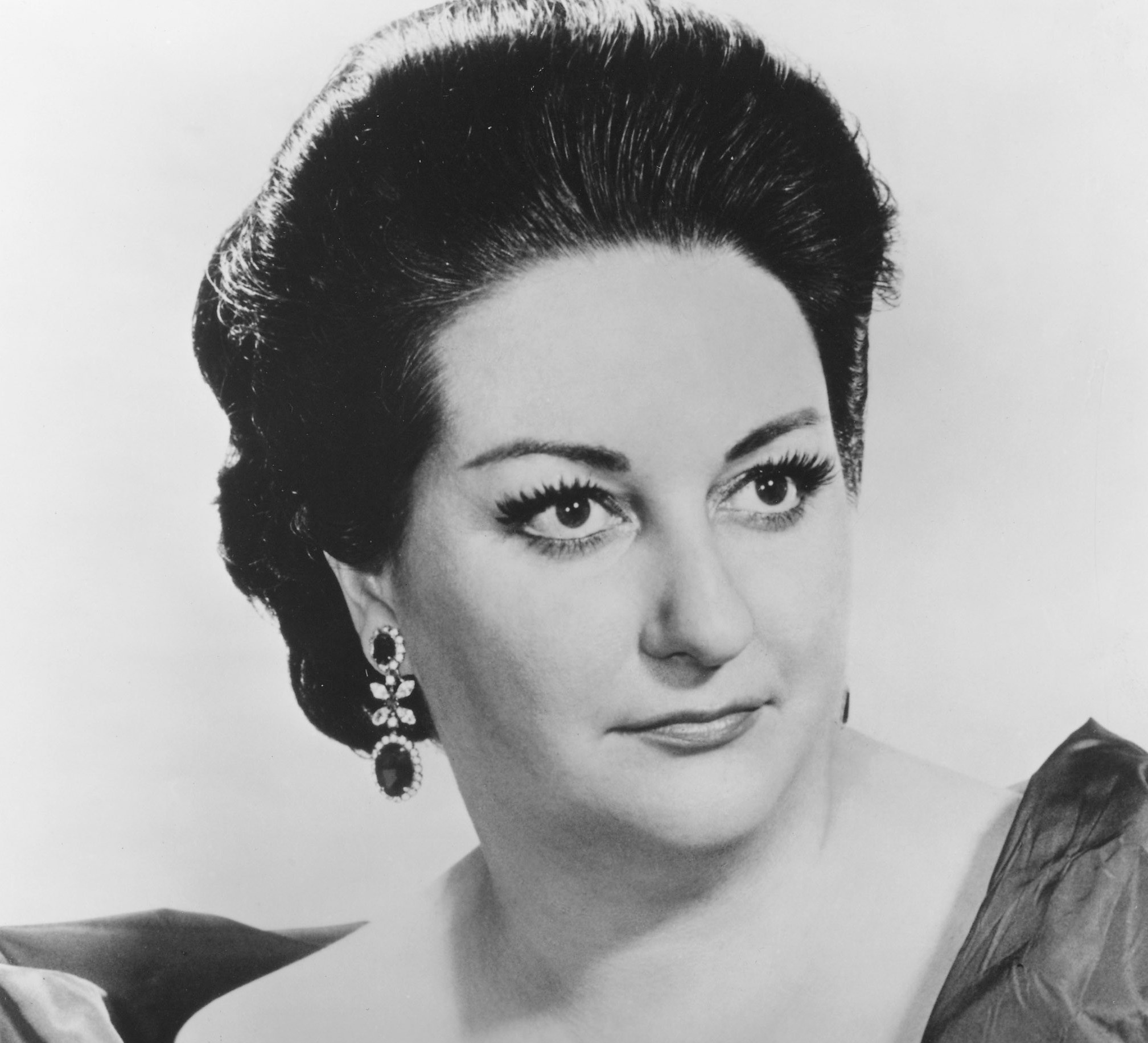
- Caballé, c. 1969
- Born: María de Montserrat Bibiana Concepción Caballé i Folch; 12 April 1933; Barcelona, Catalonia, Spanish Republic
- Died: 6 October 2018 (aged 85); Barcelona, Catalonia, Spain
- Burial place: Cementiri de Sant Andreu, Barcelona, Spain
- Other name: La Superba ('The Superb One')
- Education: Conservatori Superior de Música del Liceu
- Occupation: Operatic soprano
- Years active: 1956–2018
- Title: Kammersängerin
- Spouse: Bernabé Martí (m. 1964)
- Children: 2, including Montserrat Martí
- Awards: Honorary doctorate from the Universidad Internacional Menéndez Pelayo; Prince of Asturias Award; Grammy Award

María de Montserrat Bibiana Concepción Caballé i Folch or Folc (12 April 1933 – 6 October 2018), simply known as Montserrat Caballé (i Folch), (Note: English pronunciation: UK: /kəˈbæljeɪ, ˌkæbæ(l)ˈjeɪ/ kə-BAL-yay, KAB-a(l)-YAY, US: /ˌkɑːbɑːˈjeɪ/ KAH-bah-YAY; Catalan pronunciation: [munsəˈrat kəβəˈʎe (j ˈfolk)].) was a Spanish (Catalan) operatic soprano. Widely considered to be one of the greatest sopranos of the 20th century, she won a variety of musical awards throughout her six-decade career, including three Grammy Awards.

Caballé performed a wide variety of roles, but is best known as an exponent of the works of Verdi and of the bel canto repertoire, notably the works of Rossini, Bellini, and Donizetti. She was noticed internationally when she stepped in for a performance of Donizetti's Lucrezia Borgia at Carnegie Hall in 1965, and then appeared at leading opera houses. Her voice was described as pure but powerful, with superb control of vocal shadings and exquisite pianissimo.

Caballé is also known for her 1987 duet with Freddie Mercury, "Barcelona", later used for the 1992 Olympic Games. The two had mutual admiration for each other and developed a close friendship.

== Early life ==
Caballé was born in Barcelona on 12 April 1933. Her family was of humble financial circumstances due to the Civil War. She studied music at the Liceu Conservatory, and singing technique with Napoleone Annovazzi, Eugenia Kemény and Conchita Badía. She graduated with a gold medal in 1954. She subsequently moved to Basel, Switzerland, where she made her professional debut in 1956 as a last minute replacement as Mimì in Puccini's La bohème.

She became part of the Basel Opera company between 1957 and 1959, singing a repertoire that included Mozart (Erste Dame in Die Zauberflöte) and Strauss (Salome) in German, unusual for Spanish singers, but which proved useful for her next engagement at the Bremen Opera (1959–1962). In 1961, she starred as Iphigénie in Gluck's Iphigénie en Tauride at the National Theatre of S. Carlos in Lisbon, alongside Raymond Wolansky, Jean Cox, Paul Schöffler and others.

In 1962, Caballé returned to Barcelona and debuted at the Liceu, singing the title role in Strauss's Arabella. From the fall of 1962 through the spring of 1963 she toured Mexico, at one point singing the title role in Massenet's Manon at the Palacio de Bellas Artes. This was followed by several more successful appearances at the Liceu in 1963.

== International success ==
Caballé's international breakthrough came in 1965 when she replaced a pregnant Marilyn Horne in a semi-staged performance of Donizetti's Lucrezia Borgia at New York's Carnegie Hall, which earned her a 25-minute standing ovation. While this was her first engagement in a bel canto opera and she had to learn the role in less than one month, her performance made her famous throughout the opera world. Later that year, Caballé made her debut at the Glyndebourne Festival singing her first Marschallin in Richard Strauss' Der Rosenkavalier and portraying the role of Countess Almaviva in Mozart's Le nozze di Figaro. Ryland Davies, who sang the Major Domo alongside Caballé in Der Rosenkavalier, told an anecdote about her. Onstage, she unexpectedly asked him for a cognac.

Exiting stage left, he was met by an alarmed stage assistant, who was dispatched to the Long Bar to fetch one. Returning to the stage, he delivered the cognac to Caballé with the words "Ecco, Signora!" Whispering "Grazie, grazie!", she turned her back on the audience, drained the glass and continued in her role: "Abtreten die Leut!" ("Send everyone away.")

In December 1965, she returned to Carnegie Hall for her second bel canto opera, singing the role of Queen Elizabeth I in Donizetti's recently rediscovered Roberto Devereux. Caballé closed out the year with her Metropolitan Opera debut on 22 December 1965, appearing as Marguerite in Gounod's Faust alongside John Alexander in the title role, Justino Díaz as Méphistophélès, and Sherrill Milnes as Valentin in his debut at the Met.

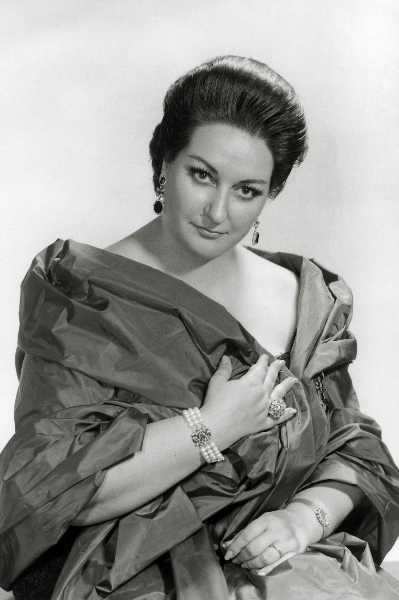
Caballé c. 1969

In 1966, Caballé made her first appearance with the Philadelphia Lyric Opera Company as Maddalena di Coigny in Giordano's Andrea Chénier and her Italian debut at the Maggio Musicale Fiorentino as Leonora in Verdi's Il trovatore, followed by Bellini's Il pirata in 1967. She returned to Philadelphia in 1967 to sing the title roles in Puccini's Tosca and Madama Butterfly, and to the Met to sing three Verdi heroines: Leonora alongside Richard Tucker as Manrico in Il Trovatore, Desdemona in Otello with James McCracken in the title role, and Violetta in La traviata, with Tucker and George Shirley alternating as Alfredo. She returned to the Met the following year in the title role in Verdi's Luisa Miller, and in 1969 for the role of Liù in Puccini's Turandot, with Birgit Nilsson in the title role and James King as Calàf. She also returned to Philadelphia as Imogene in Bellini's Il pirata (1968) and Lucrezia Borgia (1969).

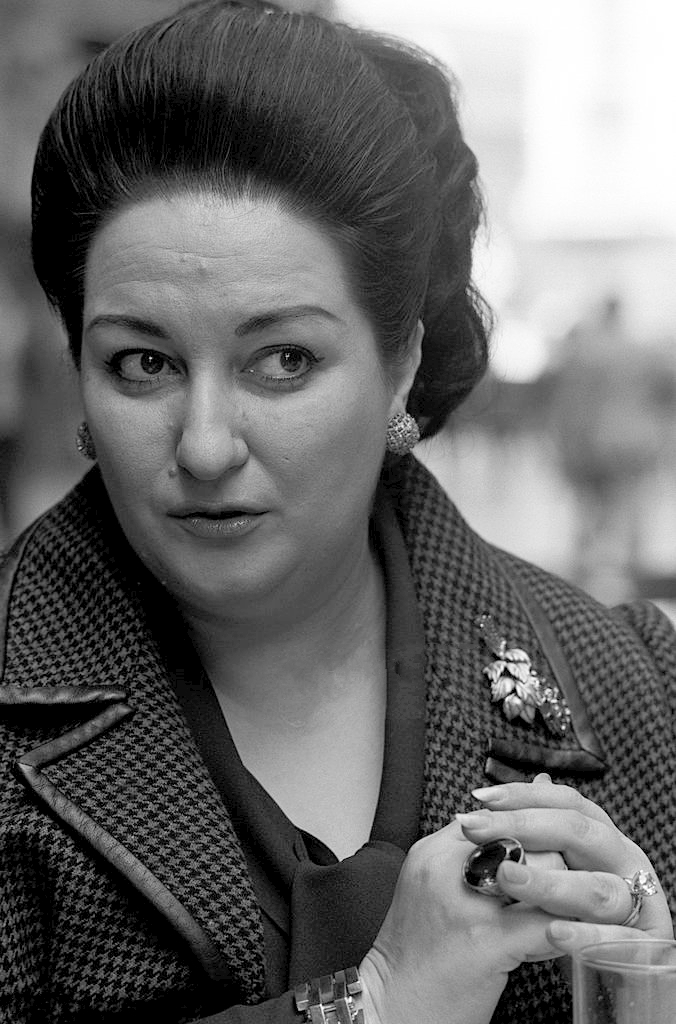
Caballé in Milan, Italy, 1971

In 1969, Caballé appeared at the Arena di Verona in a Jean Vilar production of Verdi's Don Carlo. She was Elisabetta of Valois in an all-star cast including Plácido Domingo and Piero Cappuccilli. In the same period she also appeared in recital at the Teatro Corallo in Verona. In 1970, Caballé made her official debut at La Scala in the title role of Lucrezia Borgia. She appeared as Leonora in Philadelphia, and returned to the Met as Amelia in a critically acclaimed production of Verdi's Un ballo in maschera with Domingo as Riccardo, and Reri Grist as Oscar.

In 1972, she made her first appearances at Covent Garden and the Lyric Opera of Chicago, both in the role of Violetta. That same year she returned to the Met as Elisabetta in Don Carlo with Franco Corelli in the title role, and sang the title role of Bellini's Norma in Philadelphia. In 1973 she returned to Chicago to perform the title role in Donizetti's Maria Stuarda with Viorica Cortez but left mid contract because she was suffering with phlebitis. This marked her final performance at the Lyric Opera of Chicago. That same year she performed at the Met as Bellini's Norma, opposite Carlo Cossutta in his Met debut as Pollione and Fiorenza Cossotto as Adalgisa.

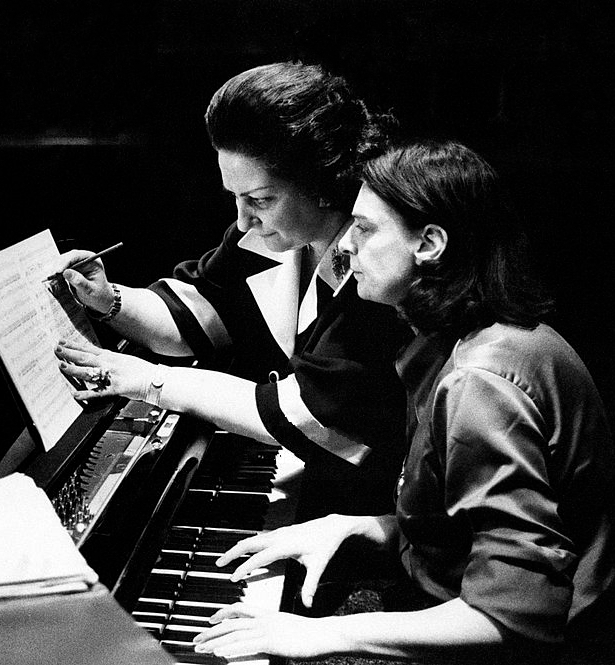
Caballé with her pianist Nina Walker in 1975

In 1974, Caballé appeared in the title role of Verdi's Aida at the Liceu in January, in Verdi's I vespri siciliani at the Met in March, and in Parisina d'Este at Carnegie Hall, also in March. She appeared as Norma at the Bolshoi Theatre in Moscow and in Adriana Lecouvreur at La Scala in April. She was filmed as Norma in Orange in July by Pierre Jourdan. She recorded Aida with Riccardo Muti in July and made a recording of duets with Giuseppe Di Stefano in August. In September 1974, she underwent major surgery to remove a large benign mass from her abdomen. She recovered and was performing again onstage by early 1975. In 1976 Caballé appeared at the Met once again as Norma and sang her first Aida in that house, alongside Robert Nagy as Radamès and Marilyn Horne as Amneris. She appeared in the title role of Ariadne auf Naxos by Richard Strauss and sang Mimì in Puccini's La bohème with Luciano Pavarotti as Rodolfo.

In 1977, Caballé made her debut with the San Francisco Opera in the title role of Puccini's Turandot. She returned to that house ten more times over the next decade in such roles as Elvira in Verdi's Ernani and the title roles in Ponchielli's La Gioconda, Rossini's Semiramide, and Puccini's Tosca, among others.

Having lost some of her earlier brilliance and purity of voice, Caballé offered more dramatic expressive singing in roles that demanded it. In 1978, she was Tosca in San Francisco with Pavarotti, Norma in Madrid, and Adriana Lecouvreur at the Met opposite José Carreras. She continued to appear often at the Met during the 1980s, in roles such as Tosca (1980, 1985) and Elisabetta (1985), and also sang concerts in 1981 and 1983. She gave her final performances at the Met in October 1985 as Tosca with Pavarotti as Cavaradossi and Cornell MacNeil as Scarpia.

Her voice was noted for its purity, precise control, and power. She was admired less for her dramatic instincts and acting skills than for her superb technique, vocal shadings, and exquisite pianissimos, which were inspired by Miguel Fleta.

== Later years ==
In Bellini's Norma, Caballé recorded both the title role (for RCA Red Seal in 1972, with Domingo as Pollione) and later the role of Adalgisa, to Joan Sutherland's Norma in a 1984 Decca recording conducted by Richard Bonynge. Although Bellini conceived the role of Adalgisa originally for a soprano, it is usually now sung by a mezzo-soprano. Caballé was one of few sopranos to have recorded the role, although she was over age 50 at the time of the recording in 1984. In 1986, she also took a role in the biographic film Romanza final, directed by José María Forqué.

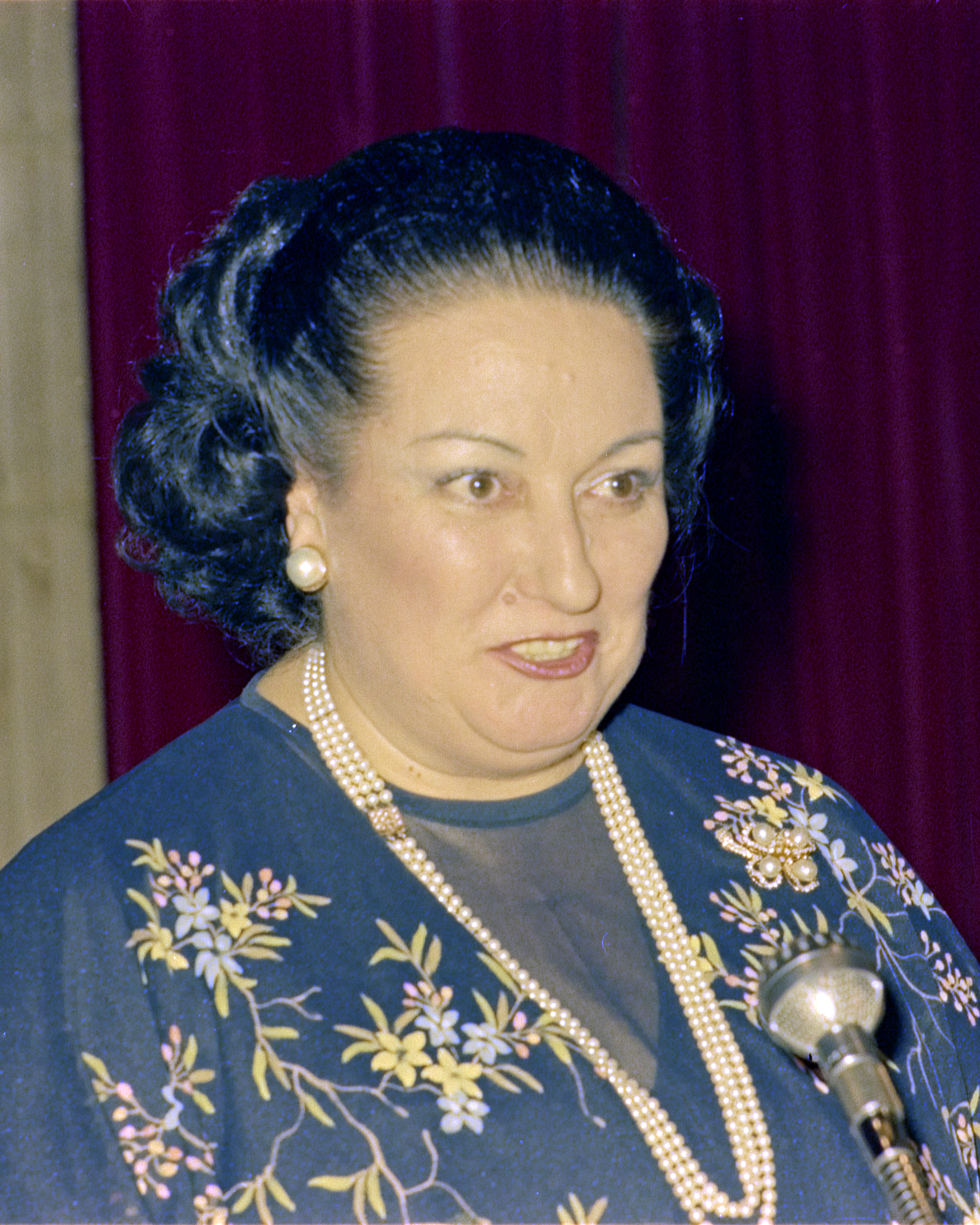
Caballé in 1982

In 1987, Caballé made a rare excursion into the world of pop music when she released a duet with Freddie Mercury, the lead singer of the rock band Queen, which was titled "Barcelona". The song was inspired by Caballé's home city and later used as one of the two official theme songs for the 1992 Olympic Games. Mercury was a great admirer of Caballé, considering her voice to be "the best in the world". The single was followed by an album of the same name which was released the following year and featured further collaborations between the two performers. The title track later became the anthem of the 1992 Summer Olympics which was hosted by Caballé's native city, and appeared again in the pop music charts throughout Europe. Caballé also performed the song live, accompanied by a recording by Mercury, who had died in 1991, before the 1999 UEFA Champions League final in Barcelona's Camp Nou stadium.

In 1994, writing for The Independent, Fiammetta Rocco said: "Caballe is one of the last of the true divas. Callas is dead, Kiri Te Kanawa is busy making commercials for Sainsbury's, and Mirella Freni has never really risen out of the narrow confines of being an opera lover's opera-singer. Caballe, on the other hand, has always had an enormous following, and it's still with her today."

In 1995, she worked with Vangelis for his album El Greco, dedicated to the Greek painter. In 1997, Mike Moran produced the album Friends For Life, which includes duets with Caballé and such singers as Bruce Dickinson, Johnny Hallyday, Johnny Logan, Gino Vannelli, and Helmut Lotti.

Caballé dedicated herself to various charities. She was a UNESCO Goodwill Ambassador and established a foundation for needy children in Barcelona. In 2003, she starred in her own documentary film Caballé: Beyond Music, which featured many well-known opera singers, including Domingo, Pavarotti, Carreras, and Renée Fleming.

In 2002, she appeared as Catherine of Aragon in Henri VIII by Saint-Saëns, and in 2004 in the title role of Massenet's Cléopâtre, both at the Liceu. She appeared as The Duchess of Crakenthorp in Donizetti's La fille du régiment at the Vienna State Opera in April 2007.

In 2003, Patrick O'Connor wrote in Gramophone that:

no diva in memory has sung such an all-encompassing amount of the soprano repertory, progressing through virtually the entire range of Italian light lyric, lirico-spinto and dramatic roles, including all the pinnacles of the bel canto, Verdi and verismo repertories, whilst simultaneously being a remarkable interpreter of Salome, Sieglinde and Isolde.

On 6 June 2013, Caballé was declared persona non grata in Azerbaijan after visiting the de facto independent state of Nagorno-Karabakh and meeting with local leaders, despite official warnings issued by the Azerbaijani embassy in Spain.

== Tax evasion ==
In 2015, Caballé was under prosecution over allegations of tax evasion or fraud. She admitted that despite living in Spain in 2010, she had registered in Andorra in order to avoid paying tax in Spain. In December 2015 the Spanish court found her guilty of fraud and gave her a six-month suspended jail sentence, ordering her to pay a fine of €254,231. She was also banned from receiving any public subsidies for 18 months.

== Family ==
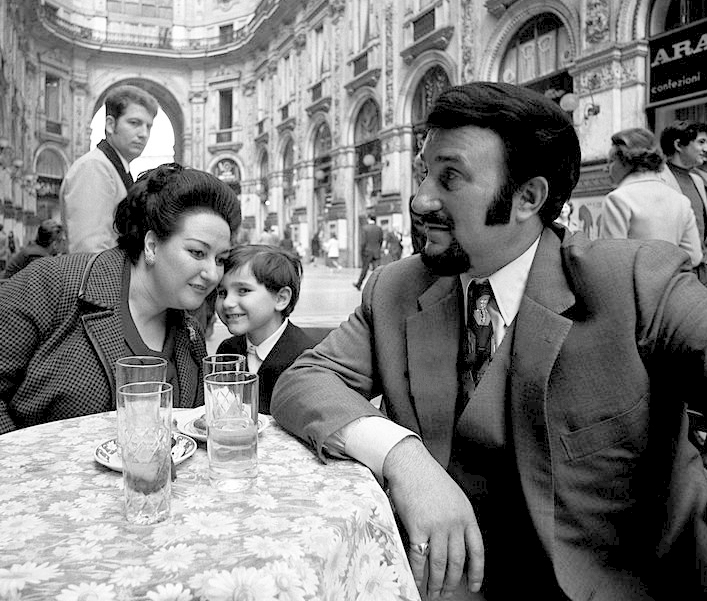
Caballé with husband and son, at Galleria Vittorio Emanuele II, Milan, 1971

Caballé married Spanish tenor Bernabé Martí (1928–2022) on 14 August 1964 at Santa Maria de Montserrat Abbey. They had two children, including Montserrat Martí, who is also an operatic soprano.

== Health problems and death ==
On 20 October 2012, during her tour in Russia, Caballé suffered a stroke in Yekaterinburg and was quickly transferred to the Hospital de Sant Pau in Barcelona.

In September 2018, she was admitted to the same hospital for a gallbladder problem. She died there on 6 October 2018 at the age of 85. The cause of death was not given. Felipe VI of Spain described Caballé as "the best of the best", and Spanish prime minister Pedro Sánchez called her the great ambassador of Spain. Caballé was buried in the Cementiri de Sant Andreu in Barcelona.

== Recordings ==
Caballé recorded extensively throughout her long career and made many notable recordings of complete operas as well as recital albums. After a number of recordings early in her career for RCA Victor Red Seal, Caballé also recorded for EMI, Decca, and Philips among other labels. She left a "vast discography" of her major roles, including Aida, conducted by Riccardo Muti, Elisabetta in Don Carlo conducted by Carlo Maria Giulini, Fiordiligi in Mozart's Così fan tutte with Colin Davis, Tosca with Colin Davis alongside José Carreras, Liù in Turandot alongside Joan Sutherland and Pavarotti, conducted by Zubin Mehta, and Salome with Erich Leinsdorf. She recorded many bel canto and Rossini roles. Recital recordings include a Puccini collection with Charles Mackerras, a Strauss collection with Leonard Bernstein, and duets with Shirley Verrett. She recorded the soprano solo in Verdi's Requiem with John Barbirolli in 1969, and Zubin Mehta in 1980.

== Discography ==
- Barcelona, Freddie Mercury and Montserrat Caballé, 1987
- Marilyn Horne: Divas in Song, RCA Victor Red Seal CD, 09026-62547-2, 1994
- Friends for Life, 1997

== Videography ==
- The Metropolitan Opera Centennial Gala (1983), Deutsche Grammophon DVD, 00440-073-4538, 2009
- Glyndebourne Festival Opera: a Gala Evening (1992), Arthaus Musik DVD, 100-432, 2004
- The Island of Christianity: Armenia & Artsakh (2013), Starmus DVD, 2020

== Music award nominations and wins ==
Award	Year (Note: Indicates the year of ceremony. Each year is linked to the article about the awards held that year, wherever possible.)	Recipient(s)	Category	Result	Ref.
Grammy Awards	1967	Montserrat Caballé – Presenting Montserrat Caballe (Bellini and Donizetti arias)	Best Classical Vocal Soloist Performance (with or without orchestra)	Nominated	
Grammy Awards	1967	Montserrat Caballé – Presenting Montserrat Caballe (Bellini and Donizetti arias)	Album of the Year - Classical	Nominated	
Grammy Awards	1969	Montserrat Caballé – Rossini: Rarities	Best Vocal Soloist Performance	Won	
Grammy Awards	1975	Richard Mohr (producer); Georg Solti (conductor), Judith Blegen, Montserrat Caballé, Plácido Domingo, Sherrill Milnes, Ruggero Raimondi - Puccini: La bohème (London Philharmonic Orchestra)	Best Opera Recording	Won	
Grammy Awards	1976	Erik Smith (producer); Colin Davis (conductor), Richard Van Allan, Janet Baker, Montserrat Caballé, Ileana Cotrubaș, Wladimiro Ganzarolli, Nicolai Gedda - Mozart: Così fan tutte (Royal Opera House Orchestra)	Best Opera Recording	Won	
Grammy Awards	1989	Richard Bonynge, Montserrat Caballé, Luciano Pavarotti, Samuel Ramey & Joan Sutherland; Andrew Cornall, producer – Bellini: Norma (Welsh National Opera Chorus; Welsh National Opera Orchestra)	Best Opera Recording	Nominated	
Grammy Awards	2004	Montserrat Caballé – Songs of the Spanish Renaissance, Vol. 1	Best Classical Vocal Performance	Nominated	
Latin Grammy Awards	2007	Montserrat Caballé, artist. Carlos Caballé, producer. Mauricio Tonelli, engineer. Josep Baiges & Marc Blanes, engineers/mixers – La Canción Romántica Española	Best Classical Album	Won	
Primetime Creative Arts Emmy Awards	1986	John Goberman, producer; Marc Bauman, coordinating producer; Isaac Stern, Itzhak Perlman and Montserrat Caballé, performers - New York Philharmonic Celebration with Isaac Stern	Outstanding Classical Program in the Performing Arts	Nominated	
RSH-Gold	1996	Montserrat Caballé – Barcelona	Classic LP of the Year	Won	

== Honours and awards ==
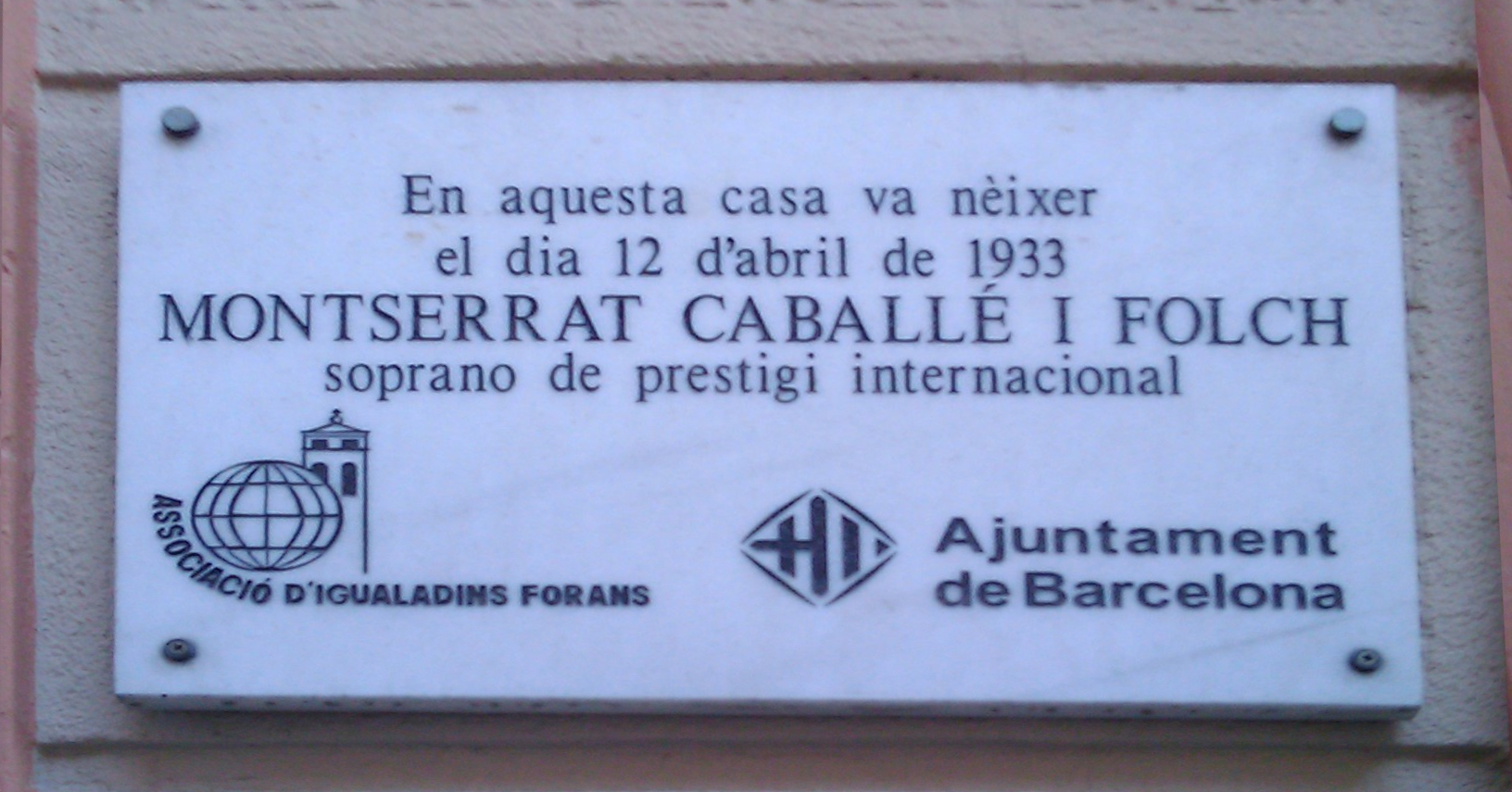
Plaque at her birthplace in Barcelona

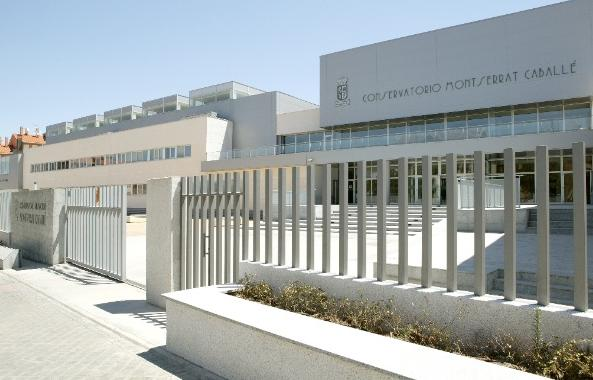
Music academy Montserrat Caballé in Arganda del Rey.

- 1966: Dame Commander of the Order of Isabella the Catholic
- 1975: Grand Cross of the Civil Order of Alfonso X, the Wise
- 1991: Prince of Asturias Award for the Arts.
- 2003: Großes Bundesverdienstkreuz (Commander's Cross of the Order of Merit of the Federal Republic of Germany)
- 2005: Legion of Honour
- 2007: Appointed Kammersängerin of the Vienna State Opera
- 2008: Honoris Causa doctorate from the Universidad Internacional Menéndez Pelayo in Santander
- 2009: Grand Cross of the Order of Merit of the Italian Republic by the President of Italy
- 2011: Honoris causa doctorate of the University of Barcelona
- 2022: Google Doodle in commemoration of her 89th birthday on April 12.
