= Aranda =

Aranda may refer to:

== Places ==
- Aranda, Australian Capital Territory, a suburb in Canberra, Australia, named after the Arrernte or Aranda Indigenous people
- Aranda (comarca), a comarca (county) in Aragon, Spain
- Aranda de Duero, Burgos province, Spain
- Aranda de Moncayo, Zaragoza, Aragon, Spain

== Ships ==
- Aranda, a 1953-built Finnish research ship now known as Katarina (1953 ship)
- Aranda (1989 ship), a research vessel owned by the Finnish Environment Institute

== Other uses ==
- Aranda (band), a rock band from Oklahoma City, Oklahoma
  - Aranda (album), a 2008 studio album by the titular American rock group
- Aranda (surname)
- × Aranda, a hybrid genus of orchids
- Arrernte people, an Aboriginal Australian people often spelt Aranda
  - Arrernte language, dialect cluster spoken by some Arrernte people

== See also ==
- Arandas (disambiguation)
