= Kontio (icebreaker) =

Finnish icebreaker built in 1987

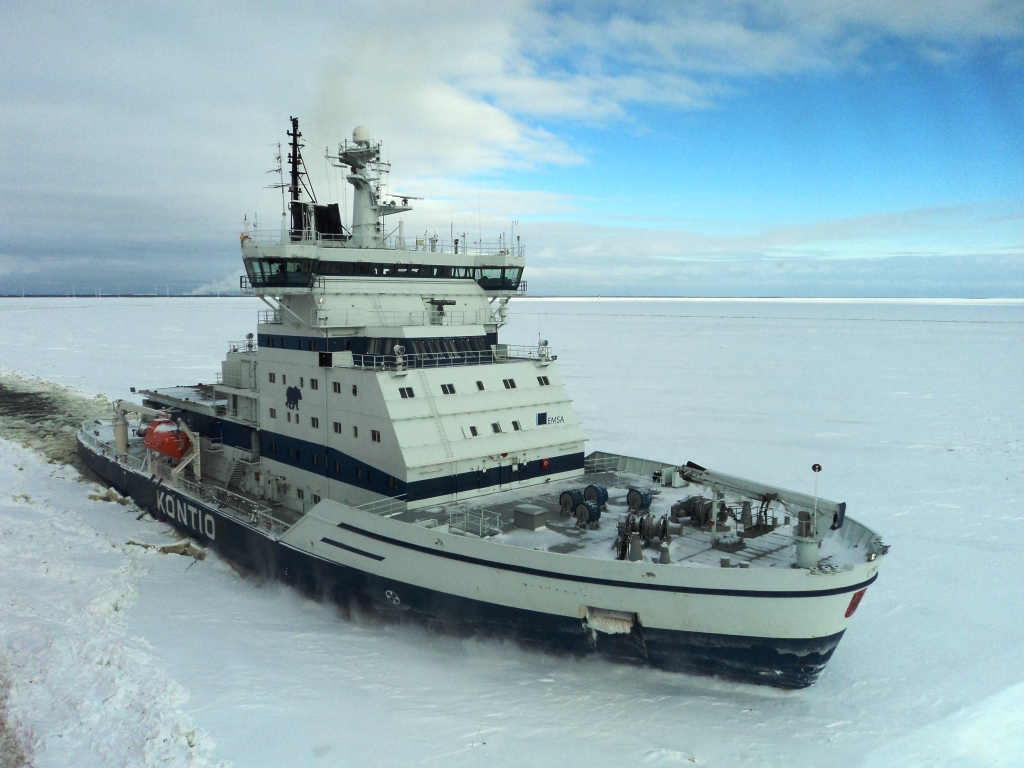
- Kontio assisting ships off Kemi, Finland, in February 2012.

History

Finland
- Name: Kontio
- Namesake: Finnish term for bear
- Owner: Finnish Maritime Administration (Note: Finnish National Board of Navigation until 1998.) (1987–2004); Finstaship (2004–2010); Arctia Icebreaking (2010–)
- Port of registry: Helsinki, Finland
- Ordered: December 1985
- Builder: Wärtsilä Marine Helsinki Shipyard, Finland
- Yard number: 478
- Launched: 1986
- Completed: 29 January 1987
- In service: 1987–present
- Identification: IMO number: 8518120; Call sign: OIRV; MMSI number: 230251000
- Status: In service

General characteristics
- Type: Icebreaker
- Tonnage: 7,066 GT; 2,120 NT
- Displacement: 9,130 tons
- Length: 99 m (324 ft 10 in)
- Beam: 24.2 m (79 ft 5 in)
- Draft: 8 m (26 ft 3 in) (maximum)
- Installed power: 4 × Wärtsilä Vasa 16V32 (4 × 5,460 kW)
- Propulsion: Diesel-electric (AC/AC); Two shafts (2 × 7,500 kW)
- Speed: 18.5 knots (34.3 km/h; 21.3 mph); 10 knots (19 km/h; 12 mph) in 0.8 m (31 in) level ice
- Crew: 20
- Aviation facilities: Helicopter landing area
- Notes: Fitted with oil recovery equipment 2010–16

Kontio is a Finnish state-owned icebreaker. Built by Wärtsilä Helsinki shipyard in 1987 as a replacement for the aging Karhu-class icebreakers, she and her sister ship Otso were the first Finnish post-war icebreaker to be built without bow propellers.

In addition to icebreaker duties, Kontio was fitted for oil spill response by the European Maritime Safety Agency between 2010 and 2016.

== Development and construction ==
In the early 1980s, the Finnish National Board of Navigation began looking for a replacement for the aging Karhu-class icebreakers Karhu, Murtaja and Sampo which had been built in the late 1950s and were no longer wide enough to escort modern merchant ships. Furthermore, the old icebreakers were expensive to operate and, despite their small size, required a relatively large crew of 53. The development of the new class of icebreakers, dubbed Karhu II in the preliminary papers, intensified when Wärtsilä opened a new ice model test facility in 1983. The first new icebreaker, Otso, was ordered from Wärtsilä Helsinki shipyard on 19 March 1984 with a price of FIM 235 million and commissioned in January 1986. The second ship, identical to the first one, was ordered in December 1985 and delivered to the owners on 29 January 1987. Her name, Kontio, is one of the many terms for bear in the Finnish language. Afterwards, the three Karhu class icebreakers were decommissioned and sold.

In terms of performance, Kontio is identical to her sister ship Otso. During extensive ice trials in the Bothnian Bay in March 1986, Otso was put through a series of test to determine her icebreaking capability. In a race against the 1975-built Urho in 0.8-metre (31 in) level ice, Otso beat the older but more powerful four-propelled icebreaker by a ship's length, showing that in terms of ice resistance the new icebreaker was superior to her predecessor. In 40-centimetre (16 in) ice, she could easily maintain a speed of 16 knots (30 km/h; 18 mph) and small ice ridges along the way appeared to be of no consequence to the vessel. However, the strength of the new icebreaker was put to the ultimate test when she encountered a large pressure ridge reaching all the way to the seafloor some 20 metres (66 ft) below the surface. After preparations, Otso was accelerated to a speed of 14 knots (26 km/h; 16 mph) and rammed into the ridge at full power. Since the new icebreaker had a smooth inclined stem and lacked the bow propellers of her predecessors, she rode up the ridge and began listing to the port side as the hull rose from the water. After coming to a stop, Otso slid back by herself without utilizing the engines, and the ridge was penetrated on the second charge. The robustness of the ship and its propulsion system were further proven when the icebreaker was backed into a ridge at 10 knots (19 km/h; 12 mph) "to prove to the customer it doesn't break".

== Technical details ==
=== General characteristics ===
Although the 99-metre (325 ft) Kontio is slightly shorter than her predecessors Urho and Sisu, she is slightly wider and was, at the time of her delivery, the widest subarctic icebreaker in the world with a beam of 24.2 metres (79 ft). However, with a maximum draft of 8 metres (26 ft) and a minimum operating draft of only 7.3 metres (24 ft), Kontio is able to escort ships to shallower ports than her predecessors. The displacement of the icebreaker is 9,130 tons.

In many ways, Otso and Kontio were a significant departure from the traditional Finnish icebreaker design. The extended bridge wings on top of the stylish superstructure feature full-depth all-round windows that provide almost 360 degree visibility from the main steering position, which has been moved to the starboard bridge wing from the centerline. Furthermore, the traditional colours dating back to the Imperial Russian era, yellow and black, were replaced with the colors of the flag of Finland, blue and white. Due to the extensive use of advanced automation, which allowed everything ranging from starting and stopping the main engines to raising and lowering the flag to be done remotely from the bridge, Otso and Kontio had the smallest crew among Finnish state-owned icebreakers when she entered service in 1986. Later her crew has been further reduced to 20. Kontio was also the first icebreaker in which the lifeboats, unusable in ice-infested waters, were replaced with inflatable life rafts that could be lowered on the ice. However, lifeboats were fitted when the icebreaker was equipped for oil spill response.

While Kontio holds the highest Finnish-Swedish ice class, 1A Super, it has hardly any meaning for icebreakers which are of considerably stronger build than merchant ships operating in their care. Coated with low-friction Inerta 160 epoxy paint, the hull plating has thickness of over 30 millimetres (1.2 in) in the bow and the waterline is protected by an explosion welded stainless steel compound plating that further reduces ice friction and resists abrasion. Galvanic corrosion is prevented by active cathodic protection.

=== Power and propulsion ===
Like all modern Finnish icebreakers, Kontio has a diesel-electric propulsion system. It utilizes the so-called power plant principle in which the main generators provide electricity for all shipboard consumers through a common busbar. Her main generators, four 16-cylinder Wärtsilä Vasa 16V32 four-stroke medium-speed diesel engines producing 5,460 kW each and driving 7,540 kVA Kymi-Strömberg alternators, are located on the upper deck beneath the helicopter platform. In addition, she has two smaller Wärtsilä 4R22/26 generators with an output of 350 kW for use in ports. The uncommon location of the engine room was chosen to improve the seakeeping characteristics of the icebreaker by moving the center of gravity higher to calm the ship's motions in heavy weather. In addition, the maintenance of the main engines is easier as the heavy engine components can be handled with the ship's main crane and the heavy fuel oil tanks could be placed amidships to reduce the probability of an oil spill in case of grounding. As of 2013, Kontio and her sister ship Otso are the only Finnish icebreakers running on heavy fuel oil which, being the cheapest fuel available, reduces operational costs of the icebreaker.

Kontio and her sister ship Otso were the first icebreakers in the world to utilize cycloconverters and alternating current (AC) propulsion motors. Although electrical propulsion had already been used in Finnish icebreakers for almost five decades due to its flexibility and good torque characteristics at low propeller speeds, the older vessels had direct current (DC) propulsion motors which were very heavy and bulky at such power levels. Although it would have been possible to use two smaller DC motors in tandem, recent advances in drive and control technology as well as excellent experiences from a prototype installation on board the Finnish research vessel Aranda were in favor of the new type of propulsion system. As a result, Otso and Kontio were fitted with two Kymi-Strömberg synchronous AC motors rated at 7,500 kW. The maximum power is available at propeller speeds ranging from 115 to 220 rpm to both directions and at lower speeds the propulsion motors are capable of providing 130% of the rated torque to prevent the four-bladed stainless steel propellers from jamming in severe ice conditions. The bollard pull of Kontio is 160 tons.

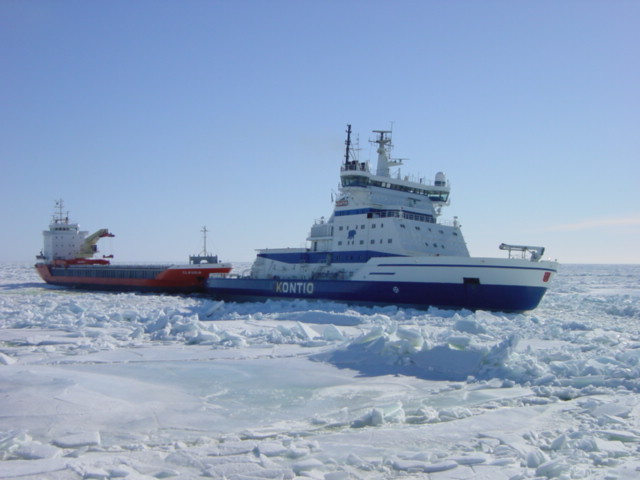
Kontio immobilized by pack ice while towing a cargo ship, a problem more likely to occur when the icebreaker has no bow propellers.

Prior to the construction of the new vessels, all Finnish state-owned icebreakers built after the Second World War had been fitted with two bow propellers to reduce the friction between ice and the hull of the vessel in difficult ice conditions. However, the quad-shaft propulsion system was expensive to build and maintain, and the forward propeller bossings considerably increased the resistance of the ship. Although Finnish icebreaker captains voiced their concerns about the maneuverability and icebreaking capability of a vessel without bow propellers especially in heavy ice ridges and at crawling speeds, extensive model testing at Wärtsilä's new ice model test basin showed that the ice resistance could be reduced by replacing the bow propellers with a "clean" hull and adopting an air bubbling system to lubricate the hull. The patented Wärtsilä Air Bubbling System (WABS) on board Otso and Kontio consists of three compressors with a combined output of 1,900 kW that pump air through 46 nozzles located below the waterline on both sides of the vessel. At low speeds, the system can also be used for manoeuvering. In addition, she has large ballast tanks and high-capacity pumps that can be used for rapid heeling and trimming to release the icebreaker if she is immobilized by compressive pack ice.

Like her sister ship Otso, Kontio has also been retrofitted with a bow thruster to assist manoeuvering.

=== Oil recovery equipment ===
In response to the increasing oil transportation in the Gulf of Finland, the European Maritime Safety Agency (EMSA) chartered Kontio for the summer months and fitted her with oil recovery equipment at a cost of 2.2 million euro. The contract, signed on 17 November 2009, was valid for three years starting from 24 July 2010 and had an option of another three years. In April 2013, the option was utilized and the contract was extended by three years. According to the contract, Kontio would remain in constant readiness in the icebreaker base at Katajanokka, Helsinki. During the winter months, she resumed her escort icebreaker duties in the Gulf of Bothnia but maintained a preparedness for oil spill response operation in ice-covered waters.

During a conversion at Turku Repair Yard in Naantali, Finland, Kontio was modified for oil spill response duties. Her large heeling tanks and one fuel tank were converted to storage tanks for recovered oil with a combined capacity of 2,033 cubic meters. Furthermore, she was fitted with cranes to handle the recovery equipment and two new lifeboats that were not deemed necessary in the past when the ship was used only for icebreaking. The oil recovery equipment on board Kontio was manufactured by Lamor. She had two rigid sweeping booms that can be deployed on both sides of the vessel to direct oil slick to stiff brush skimmers when the vessel is moving at low speeds. Due to her size, Kontio had the largest sweeping width among Finnish oil spill response vessels as well as the largest storage tank capacity. In addition, she had a remote controlled free-floating robot skimmer that could be deployed in an area enclosed by oil booms. On her aft deck, Kontio carried 500 metres (550 yd) of heavy duty open water oil boom that could also be deployed in the presence of ice. In 2013, Kontio was fitted with an additional Arctic skimmer capable of recovering oil in ice conditions.

Since 2010, Kontio regularly participated in the yearly national and international oil recovery exercises such as Balex Delta. Since she was in constant readiness, Kontio was always moored on the outside when the Finnish icebreakers are moored in tiers of two in the icebreaker base at Katajanokka during the summer months.

The contract with EMSA expired on 13 April 2016 and the oil recovery equipment was removed. During the six years that Kontio remained on standby for oil spill response operations, there were no major oil spills in the Baltic Sea.

== Career ==
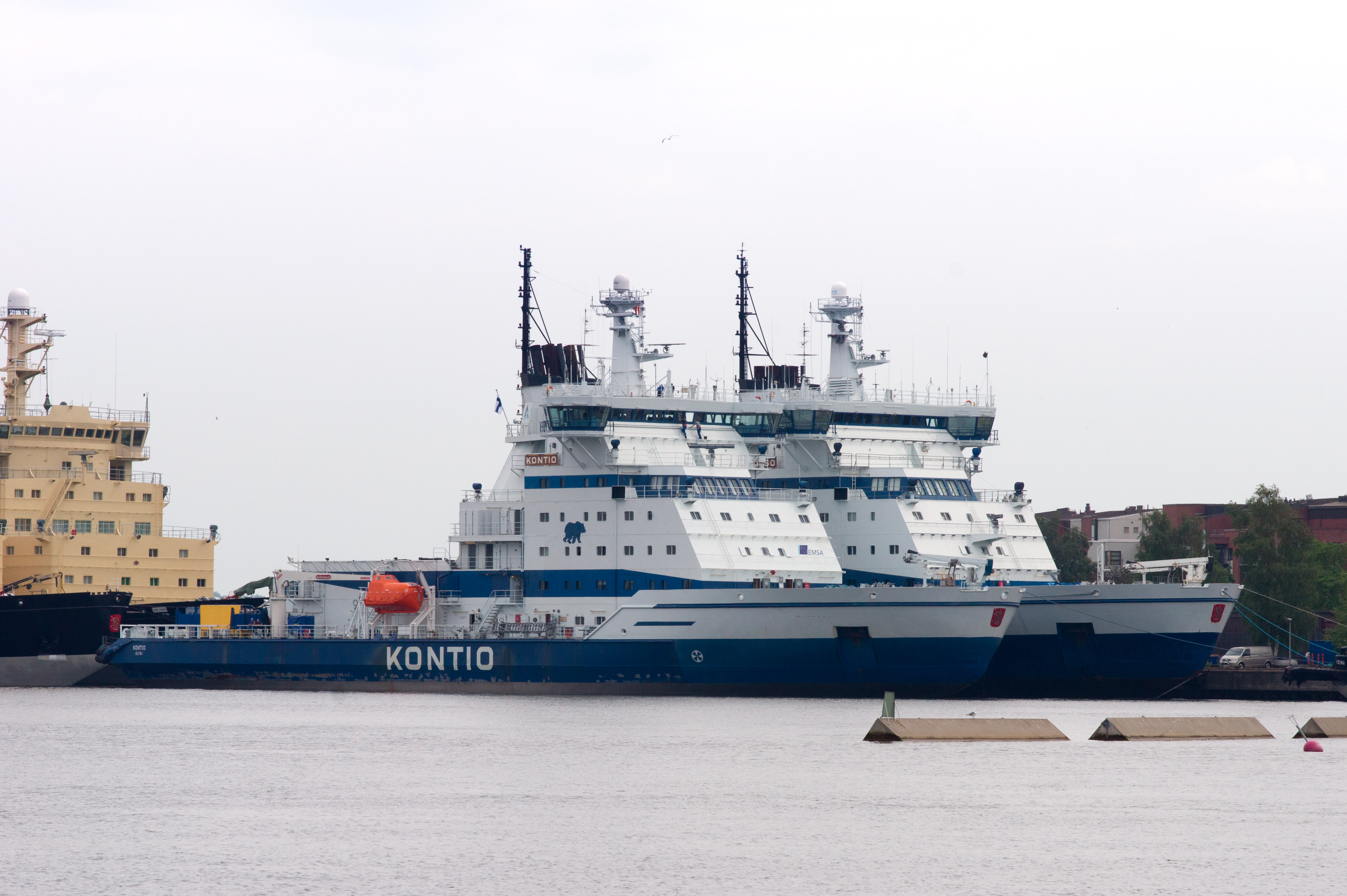
Otso and Kontio moored at Katajanokka in 2010. The oil recovery equipment is visible on the aft deck.

Before Otso entered service in 1986, the Finnish icebreaker captains were sceptical about the ability of an icebreaker without bow propellers to operate successfully in the shallow Finnish waters characterized by heavy ice ridges. However, after the early teething problems and successful ice trials, the opinions changed and the performance of the "Bubbler of the Bothnian Bay" was generally deemed to be satisfactory. Over the years, Otso and her sister ship Kontio have proved to be very cost-efficient and for that reason they are the first Finnish state-owned icebreakers to be deployed for icebreaking in the Gulf of Bothnia every winter.

In addition to icebreaking duties and, later, oil spill response preparedness, Kontio has been used for various different tasks. In July 2011, she participated in the sea trials of Dir, an escort tug built in St. Petersburg. In the tests, the much smaller tug was attached to the stern of the icebreaker to determine its bollard pull while the icebreaker towed it at different speeds.

As of 2013, Otso and Kontio are the last Finnish icebreakers designed solely for escorting merchant ships through ice-infested waters. In the 1990s, the Finnish Maritime Administration commissioned three multipurpose icebreakers with a secondary role in offshore construction projects during the summer months. However, due to the criticism of the multipurpose icebreakers and Arctic offshore drilling in general, the new icebreaker Polaris will again be a traditional one.

== Bibliography ==
- Kaukiainen, Yrjö (1992). Navigare Necesse—Merenkulkulaitos 1917–1992. Jyväskylä: Gummerus Kirjapaino Oy. ISBN 951-47-6776-4.
- Turunen, Ari; Partanen, Petja (2011). Raakaa voimaa—Suomalaisen jäänmurtamisen tarina. Jyväskylä: Atena Kustannus Oy. ISBN 978-951-796-762-4.
