= Atle-class icebreaker =

Class of Swedish and Finnish icebreakers

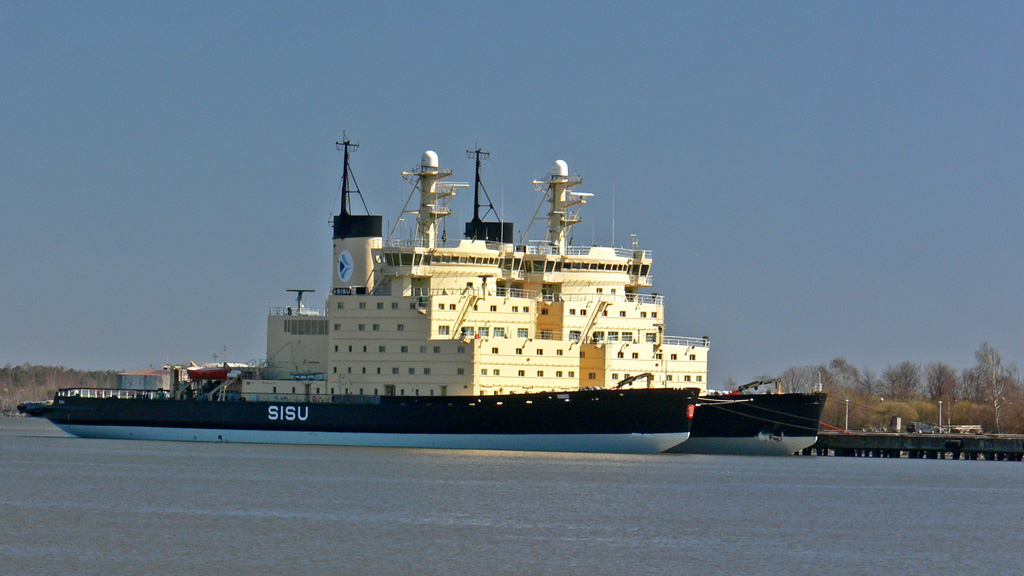
- Swedish Atle-class icebreakers Frej, Atle and Ymer (above) and Finnish Urho-class icebreakers Sisu and Urho (below)

Class overview
- Builders: Wärtsilä Helsinki Shipyard, Finland
- Operators: Arctia (Finland); Swedish Maritime Administration (Sweden)
- Preceded by: Tarmo class (Finland and Sweden)
- Succeeded by: Otso class (Finland); Oden (Sweden)
- Built: 1974–1977
- In service: 1974–present
- Completed: 5
- Active: 5

General characteristics
- Type: Icebreaker
- Displacement: 9,660 t (9,510 long tons)
- Length: 104.6 m (343 ft)
- Beam: 23.8 m (78 ft)
- Draft: 8.3 m (27 ft)
- Installed power: 5 × Wärtsilä-SEMT Pielstick 12PC2.2V400 (Atle class) or 12PC2.5V400 (Urho class)
- Propulsion: Diesel-electric (DC/DC); four shafts; 16.2 MW (combined)
- Speed: 18 knots (33 km/h; 21 mph) in open water; 3 knots (5.6 km/h; 3.5 mph) in 1.2 m (3.9 ft) ice

Atle class and Urho class are a series of three icebreakers built for Sweden and two for Finland, respectively. All five icebreakers were built by Wärtsilä Helsinki Shipyard in the mid-1970s and remain in service with the Swedish Maritime Administration and the Finnish state-owned company Arctia as of 2026.

== Design ==
=== General characteristics ===
Atle- and Urho-class icebreakers are 104.6 metres (343 ft) long overall and have a beam of 23.8 metres (78 ft). Fully laden, they draw 8.3 metres (27 ft) of water and have a displacement of 9,660 tonnes (9,510 long tons). Despite having almost twice the displacement and being about 3 metres (9.8 ft) wider, evaluation of different hull form alterantives with ice model tests during the design phase resulted in a hull form that had a lower absolute ice resistance than the preceding Tarmo-class icebreakers.

One of the early decisions was to have all crew accommodation above the upper deck, away from noise generated by the icebreaker's engines and ice breaking against the vessel's hull. Together with an effort to improve producibility during construction, the result was a large deckhouse resembling an apartment block, a clear departure from the previous icebreaker generations' classic curved lines and generally shipshape appearance. However, thanks to advances in machinery automation the number of crew could be reduced compared to the preceding Tarmo class.

Aside icebreaking duties, the two Finnish icebreakers were fitted for different secondary purposes: Urho as a state ship with one accommodation deck dedicated solely for passengers with six large staterooms and a dining room featuring a long 26-person table, and Sisu for training new seamen with nine 3-person cabins and a classroom. The Swedish icebreakers Atle, Ymer and Frej, on the other hand, were originally designed to be operated and crewed by the Swedish Navy and had, among other features, armament and ability to lay sea mines.

=== Power, propulsion and performance ===
Although a number of different power plant, transmission and propulsion configuration options were evaluated during early design development, the selected configuration was similar to previous generations of Finnish and Swedish icebreakers built in the 1950s and 1960s: medium-speed diesel engines, diesel-electric transmission with direct current (DC) generators and propulsion motors, and four propellers.

Whereas the Swedish Atle-class icebreakers are powered by five twelve-cylinder Wärtsilä-SEMT Pielstick 12PC2.2V400 engines rated at 5,000 horsepower (3,700 kW) each, Finland opted for similarly-powered but newer PC2.5 model with the Urho class with an additional heavy flywheel installed between the engine and the generator to increase inertia. The diesel engines and generators are installed in separate compartments to prevent oil mist and soot from the former fouling the latter. Auxiliary electrical power is generated by four 900-horsepower (670 kW) six-cylinder Wärtsilä 624 TS ship service diesel generators. Atle- and Urho-class icebreakers were the first Finnish and Swedish icebreakers fitted with twin rudders to improve maneuverability.

While initially Sweden advocated for conventional icebreaking bow and two mechanically-driven controllable pitch propellers, finally Finland's preference prevailed and the new icebreakers were built with tried-and-trusted diesel-electric propulsion and twin screws in both bow and stern. At full power, the icebreaker operates with a stern-biased 60:40 power split with a total propulsion power of 16.2 megawatts (22,000 hp).

Until the construction of the 18-megawatt (24,000 hp) Oden in 1988 and the 19-megawatt (25,000 hp) Polaris in 2016, the Atle- and Urho-class icebreakers were the most powerful vessels in the Swedish and Finnish icebreaker fleets, respectively. They are capable of maintaining a speed of 8.5 knots (15.7 km/h; 9.8 mph) in 0.8 metres (2.6 ft) thick level ice and breaking 1.2 metres (3.9 ft) thick ice at a continuous speed of 3 knots (5.6 km/h; 3.5 mph). In open water, their maximum speed is 18 knots (33 km/h; 21 mph).

== History ==
=== Background and development ===
By the mid-1960s, it had become apparent that the existing Finnish icebreaker fleet could not ensure year-round access to the Gulf of Bothnia during average winters. Despite the commissioning of the 12,000-horsepower (8.9 MW) Tarmo in 1963, the number of icebreakers was still insufficient and all Finnish ports north of Naantali had to be closed due to ice in the following winter. As a temporary solution, the Finnish Board of Navigation recommissioned the 1907-built steam-powered Tarmo that had been renamed Apu and handed over to the Finnish Navy after its diesel-electric successor of the same name had entered service. The following winter of 1966 turned out so severe that, in addition to all ports in the Gulf of Bothnia, even the easternmost Finnish port in the Gulf of Finland, Hamina, had to be closed for some time. On 27 October 1966, the Finnish Board of Navigation was authorized to order to additional Tarmo-class icebreakers. When the diesel-electric Apu was commissioned after the severe winter of 1970, Director Helge Jääsalo stated for the first time in public that from that point onward the goal of the Finnish Board of Navigation would be to keep all Finnish ports open during average winters. This was achieved for the first time during the following winter.

In April 1970, the Bank of Finland Institute for Economic Research published a paper on icebreakers and winter navigation which, while not directly supporting year-round navigation in the Bothnian Bay, recommended expanding the Finnish icebreaker fleet with two additional icebreakers by 1975 and 1–2 more by the end of the decade. Immediately afterwards, the Finnish Board of Navigation filed a supplementary budget proposal for the acquisition of two 18,000-horsepower (13,000 kW) icebreakers by 1975. Even though it was clear from the beginning that the Finnish Parliament would never accept the funding for two FIM 60,000,000 icebreakers as a supplementary budget, the Board of Navigation was in fact aiming for the next year's budget which was already being prepared at the Ministry of Finance. The plan worked and funding for the construction of one icebreaker was included in the budget of 1971.

The Finnish Board of Navigation had begun developing the next class of icebreakers together with the Swedish Maritime Administration already in the late 1960s. In order to be able to assist even the largest ships expected on both sides of the Gulf of Bothnia during the winter months, the new icebreakers would have to be wider and more powerful than their predecessors. The third participant in the icebreaker development was the Finnish shipbuilder Wärtsilä who had built all Finnish and Swedish icebreakers since the late 1930s, including two additional Tarmo-class icebreakers for Sweden in the 1960s. One of the goals of the joint development was to leverage the shipyard's offer for serial discount if multiple new icebreakers were ordered based on the same design. The resulting design, perfected in the shipyard's recently-built ice tank, was about 3 metres (9.8 ft) wider and nearly twice as powerful as the preceding Tarmo class.

On 3 December 1970, the Finnish Government authorized the Board of Navigation to order a new icebreaker for FIM 74,800,800 and the shipbuilding contract with an option for a second vessel was signed on 11 December. When it became apparent that the Swedish Government was also about to order a new icebreaker, the Finnish Board of Navigation petitioned for an authorization to utilize the option which was granted on 22 April 1971. The FIM 67,500,000 shipbuilding contract was signed on 27 April. The Swedish Government ordered the first new icebreaker in May of the same year and two additional vessels in 1973 and 1975.

Following the delivery of the second Urho-class icebreaker Sisu in 1976, Finland's maritime policy was revised with a stated goal of keeping all Finnish ports open not only during average winters, but every winter regardless of severity.

In the late 1970s, Wärtsilä came close to selling an Urho-class icebreaker to the United States with the support of U.S. Ambassador Mark Evans Austad who strongly advocated for year-round shipping on the seasonally-freezing Great Lakes. However, the Finnish icebreaker was considered too large and expensive for the Great Lakes and the bow propellers made the design unsuitable for polar waters. Instead, the United States Coast Guard ordered smaller icebreaking tugboats.

=== Construction ===
The first new icebreaker was laid down on 10 May 1973, launched on 2 October 1974, and delivered to the Swedish Maritime Administration on 21 October 1974. The vessel was named Atle after Attila as he was featured in the heroic poems of the Poetic Edda as well as a 1926-built steam-powered icebreaker of the same name that was decommissioned in 1967.

Despite having been contracted first, the first Finnish icebreaker was laid down six months after the first Swedish icebreaker on 19 December 1973, launched on 30 May 1974, and delivered to the Finnish Board of Navigation on 5 March 1975. The ship was named Urho after the Finnish president Urho Kekkonen who was also the ship's sponsor.

The second Swedish icebreaker was laid down on 3 June 1974, launched on 18 December 1974, and delivered to the Swedish Maritime Administration on 30 September 1975. The vessel was named Frej after the god Freyr in the Norse mythology.

The second and final Finnish icebreaker was laid down on 31 December 1974, launched on 29 May 1975, and delivered to the Finnish Board of Navigation on 28 January 1976. The vessel was named Sisu after the Finnish word describing will, determination and perseverance as well as a 1939-built icebreaker of the same name that was handed over to the Finnish Navy.

The third and final Swedish icebreaker was laid down on 17 February 1976, launched on 3 September 1976, and delivered to the Swedish Maritime Administration on 25 October 1977. The vessel was named Ymer after Ymir in the Norse mythology as well as the world's first diesel-electric icebreaker that was built in 1933 and decommissioned in 1977.

=== Replacement ===
After five decades of icebreaking service in the Bothnian Bay, both the Swedish Atle-class and the Finnish Urho-class icebreakers are nearing the end of their service life.

In 2017, the Swedish Maritime Administration commissioned a preliminary study focusing on the replacement of the nation's four so-called A-class icebeakers — the three Atle-class icebreakers built in the mid-1970s and the 1988-built Oden — with new vessels. The study concluded with a recommendation to begin fleet renewal with one new vessel capable of assisting up to 32 metres (105 ft) wide cargo ships and, after evaluation, continue with full fleet renewal by 2030. According to a 2026 follow-on study, the first Atle-class icebreaker would be decommissioned in 2030 after the new icebreaker ordered in 2026 has entered service. The second and third Atle-class icebreakers would be decommissioned in 2034 and late 2030s, respectively, following the construction of additional two new icebreakers.

In August 2026, the Finnish Transport Infrastructure Agency began the icebreaker fleet renewal from the smaller 1954-built Voima. However, the Finnish Ministry of Transport and Communications is developing a long-term investment plan that includes also the replacement of four bigger Finnish icebreakers built in the 1970s and 1980s.

== Ships in class ==
Name	Flag	IMO number	Contract date	Laid down	Launched	Delivered	Status	Picture
Atle	Sweden	7347627	10 May 1971	10 May 1973	2 October 1974	21 October 1974	In service	
Urho	Finland	7347615	11 December 1970	19 December 1973	30 May 1974	5 March 1975	In service	
Frej	Sweden	7359668	28 February 1973	3 June 1974	18 December 1974	30 September 1975	In service	
Sisu	Finland	7359656	27 April 1971	31 December 1974	29 May 1975	28 January 1976	In service	
Ymer	Sweden	7505346	24 March 1975	17 February 1976	3 September 1976	25 October 1977	In service	
