= Otso (icebreaker) =

Finnish icebreaker

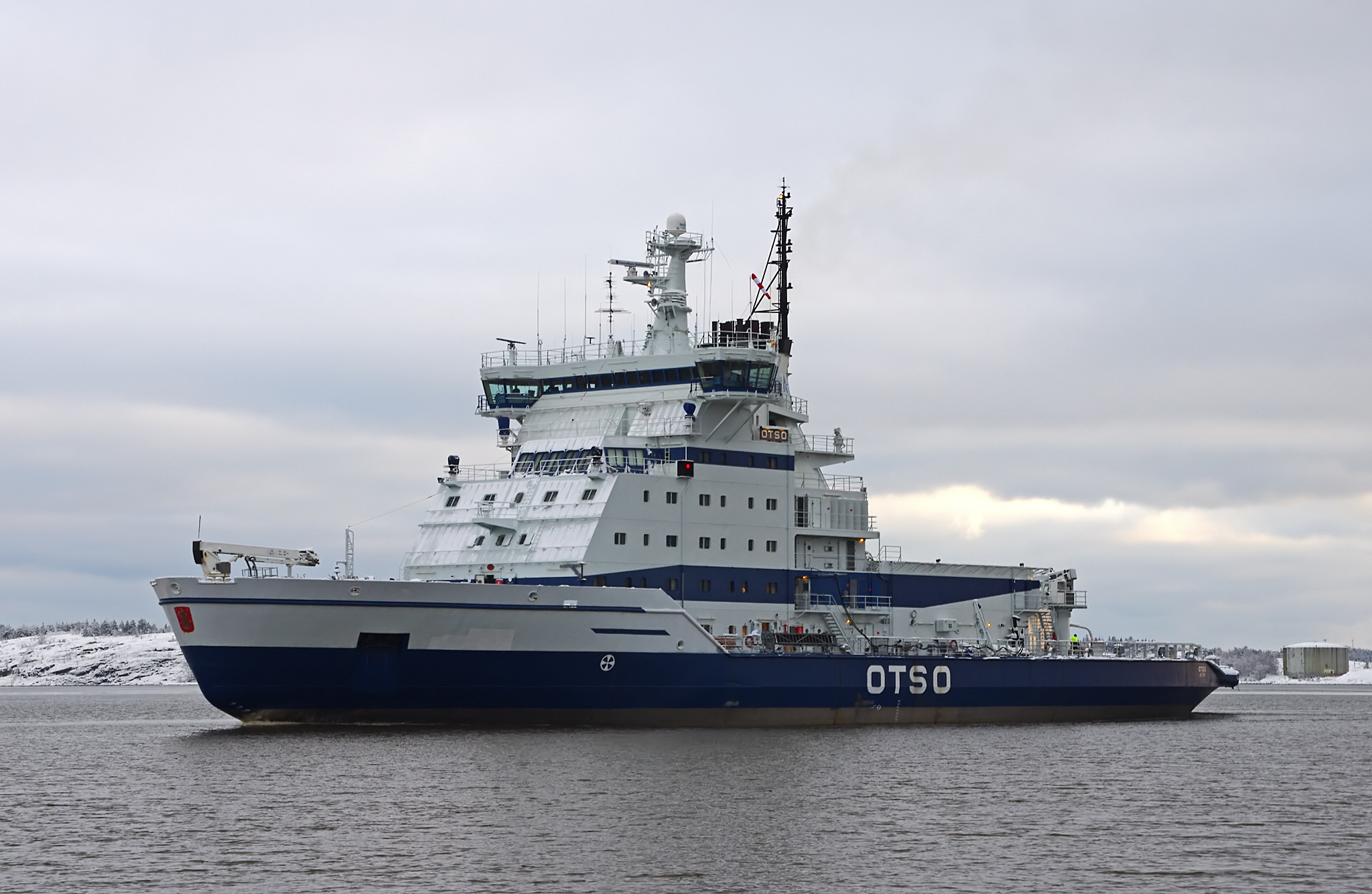
- Otso returning from sea trials to the icebreaker base at Katajanokka, Helsinki, on 18 January 2012.

History

Finland
- Name: Otso
- Namesake: Finnish term for bear
- Owner: Finnish Maritime Administration (Note: Finnish National Board of Navigation until 1998.) (1986–2004); Finstaship (2004–2010); Arctia Icebreaking (2010–)
- Port of registry: Helsinki, Finland
- Ordered: 19 March 1984
- Builder: Wärtsilä Helsinki Shipyard, Finland
- Cost: FIM 235 million
- Yard number: 472
- Launched: 12 July 1985
- Completed: 30 January 1986
- In service: 1986–present
- Identification: IMO number: 8405880; Call sign: OIRT; MMSI number: 230252000
- Status: In service

General characteristics
- Type: Icebreaker
- Tonnage: 7,189 GT; 2,157 NT
- Displacement: 9,222 tonnes
- Length: 99 m (324 ft 10 in)
- Beam: 24.2 m (79 ft 5 in)
- Draft: 8 m (26 ft 3 in) (maximum)
- Ice class: Polar Class 4 (2015–)
- Installed power: 4 × Wärtsilä Vasa 16V32 (4 × 5,460 kW)
- Propulsion: Diesel-electric (AC/AC); Two shafts (2 × 7,500 kW)
- Speed: 18.5 knots (34.3 km/h; 21.3 mph); 10 knots (19 km/h; 12 mph) in 0.8 m (31 in) level ice
- Crew: 20
- Aviation facilities: Helicopter landing area

Otso is a Finnish state-owned icebreaker. Built by Wärtsilä Helsinki shipyard in 1986 to replace the aging Karhu-class icebreakers, she was the first Finnish post-war icebreaker to be built without bow propellers. Otso has an identical sister ship, Kontio, which was delivered in 1987.

== Development and construction ==
In the early 1980s, the Finnish National Board of Navigation began looking for a replacement for the aging Karhu-class icebreakers Karhu, Murtaja and Sampo which had been built in the late 1950s and were no longer wide enough to escort modern merchant ships. Furthermore, the old icebreakers were expensive to operate and, despite their small size, required a relatively large crew of 53. The development of the new class of icebreakers, dubbed Karhu II in the preliminary papers, intensified when Wärtsilä opened a new ice model test facility in 1983. The tenth post-war icebreaker of Finland was ordered from Wärtsilä Helsinki shipyard on 19 March 1984 with a price of FIM 235 million. The ship was launched on 12 July 1985 and delivered to the owners on 30 January 1986. Her name, Otso, is one of the many terms for bear in the Finnish language. In January 1987, Otso was followed by a similarly-named sister ship, Kontio, after which the three Karhu-class icebreakers were decommissioned and sold.

During extensive ice trials in the Bothnian Bay in March 1986, Otso was put through a series of test to determine her icebreaking capability. In a race against the 1975-built Urho in 0.8-metre (31 in) level ice, Otso beat the older but more powerful four-propelled icebreaker by more than a ship's length, showing that in terms of ice resistance the new icebreaker was superior to her predecessor. In 40-centimetre (16 in) ice, she could easily maintain a speed of 16 knots (30 km/h; 18 mph) and small ice ridges along the way appeared to be of no consequence to the vessel. However, the strength of the new icebreaker was put to the ultimate test when she encountered a large pressure ridge reaching all the way to the seafloor some 20 metres (66 ft) below the surface. After preparations, Otso was accelerated to a speed of 14 knots (26 km/h; 16 mph) and rammed into the ridge at full power. Since the new icebreaker had a smooth inclined stem and lacked the bow propellers of her predecessors, she rode up the ridge and began listing to the port side as the hull rose from the water. After coming to a stop, Otso slid back by herself without utilizing the engines, and the ridge was penetrated on the second charge. The robustness of the ship and its propulsion system were further proven when the icebreaker was backed into a ridge at 10 knots (19 km/h; 12 mph) "to prove to the customer it doesn't break".

Considered to be a successful design that incorporated the latest Finnish icebreaker technology, Otso was later used as a design basis for the United States Coast Guard icebreaker Healy.{

== Technical details ==
=== General characteristics ===
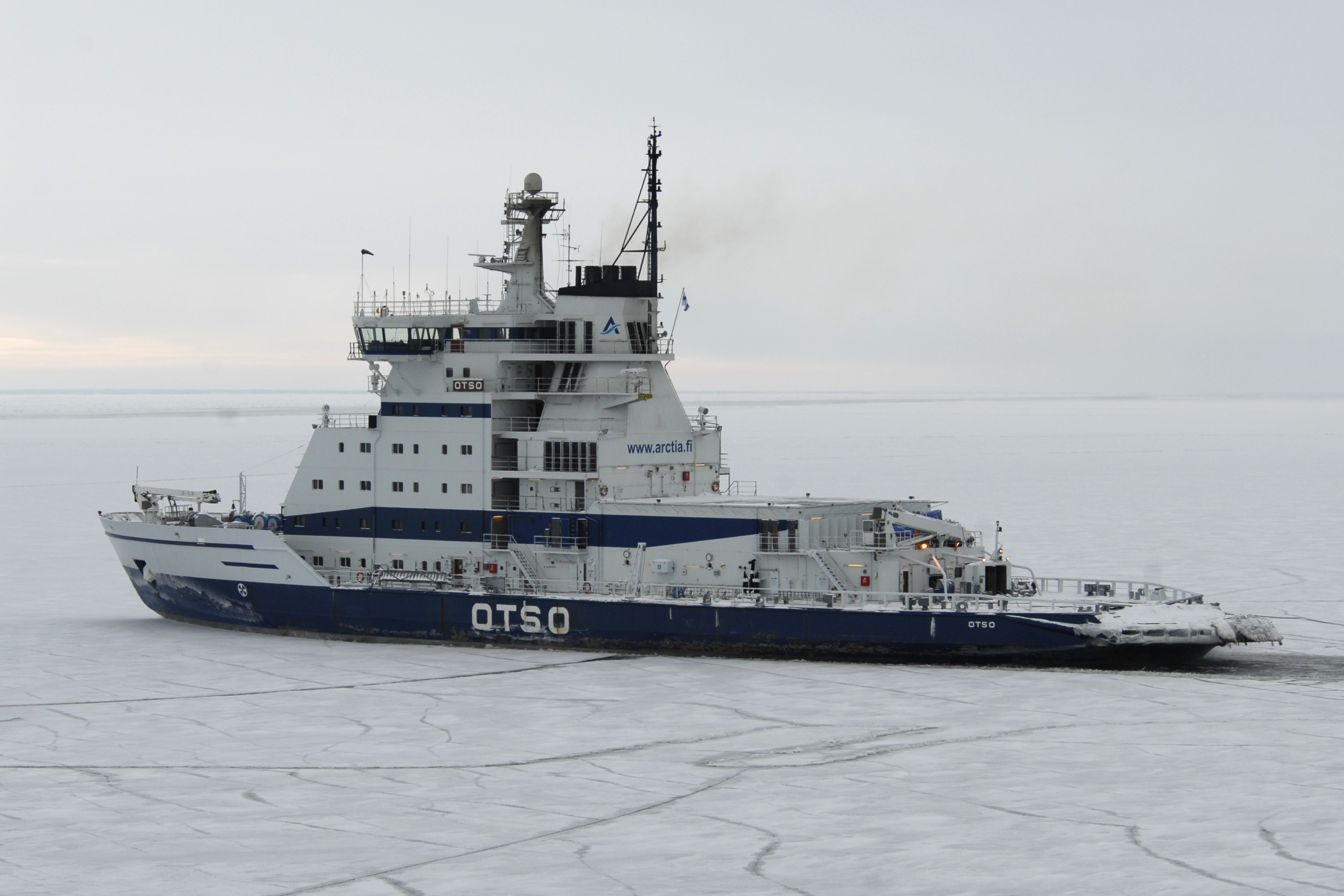
Otso in unbroken level ice outside Raahe in February 2011.

Although the 99-metre (325 ft) Otso is slightly shorter than her predecessors Urho and Sisu, she is slightly wider and was, at the time of her delivery, the widest subarctic icebreaker in the world with a beam of 24.2 metres (79 ft). However, with a maximum draft of 8 metres (26 ft) and a minimum operating draft of only 7.3 metres (24 ft), Otso is able to escort ships to shallower ports than her predecessors. The displacement of the icebreaker is 9,222 tonnes.

In many ways, Otso was a significant departure from the traditional Finnish icebreaker design. The extended bridge wings on top of the stylish superstructure feature full-depth all-round windows that provide almost 360 degree visibility from the main steering position, which has been moved to the starboard bridge wing from the centerline. Furthermore, the traditional colours dating back to the Imperial Russian era, yellow and black, were replaced with the colors of the flag of Finland, blue and white. Due to the extensive use of advanced automation, which allowed everything ranging from starting and stopping the main engines to raising and lowering the flag to be done remotely from the bridge, Otso had the smallest crew among Finnish state-owned icebreakers when she entered service in 1986. Later her crew has been further reduced to 20. Otso was also the first icebreaker in which the lifeboats, unusable in ice-covered waters, were replaced with inflatable life rafts that could be lowered on the ice.

While Otso holds the highest Finnish-Swedish ice class, 1A Super, it has hardly any meaning for icebreakers which are of considerably stronger build than merchant ships operating in their care. Coated with low-friction Inerta 160 epoxy paint, the hull plating has thickness of over 30 millimetres (1.2 in) in the bow and the waterline is protected by an explosion welded stainless steel compound plating that further reduces ice friction and resists abrasion. Galvanic corrosion is prevented by active cathodic protection.

=== Power and propulsion ===
Like all modern Finnish icebreakers, Otso has a diesel-electric propulsion system. It utilizes the so-called power plant principle in which the main generators provide electricity for all shipboard consumers through a common busbar. Her main generators, four 16-cylinder Wärtsilä Vasa 16V32 four-stroke medium-speed diesel engines producing 5,460 kW each and driving 7,540 kVA Kymi-Strömberg alternators, are located on the upper deck beneath the helicopter platform. In addition, she has two smaller Wärtsilä 4R22/26 generators with an output of 350 kW for use in ports. The uncommon location of the engine room was chosen to improve the seakeeping characteristics of the icebreaker by moving the center of gravity higher to calm the ship's motions in heavy weather. In addition, the maintenance of the main engines is easier as the heavy engine components can be handled with the ship's main crane and the heavy fuel oil tanks could be placed amidships to reduce the probability of an oil spill in case of grounding. As of 2013, Otso and her sister ship Kontio are the only Finnish icebreakers running on heavy fuel oil which, being the cheapest fuel available, reduces operational costs of the icebreaker.

Otso was the first icebreaker in the world to utilize cycloconverters and alternating current (AC) propulsion motors. Although electrical propulsion had already been used in Finnish icebreakers for almost five decades due to its flexibility and good torque characteristics at low propeller speeds, the older vessels had direct current (DC) propulsion motors which were very heavy and bulky at such power levels. Although it would have been possible to use two smaller DC motors in tandem, recent advances in drive and control technology as well as excellent experiences from a prototype installation on board the Finnish research vessel Aranda were in favor of the new type of propulsion system. As a result, Otso was fitted with two Kymi-Strömberg synchronous AC motors rated at 7,500 kW. The maximum power is available at propeller speeds ranging from 115 to 220 rpm to both directions and at lower speeds the propulsion motors are capable of providing 130% of the rated torque to prevent the four-bladed stainless steel propellers from jamming in severe ice conditions. The bollard pull of Otso is 160 tonnes.

Prior to the construction of Otso, all Finnish state-owned icebreakers built after the Second World War had been fitted with two bow propellers to reduce the friction between ice and the hull of the vessel in difficult ice conditions. However, the quad-shaft propulsion system was expensive to build and maintain, and the forward propeller bossings considerably increased the resistance of the ship. Although Finnish icebreaker captains voiced their concerns about the maneuverability and icebreaking capability of a vessel without bow propellers especially in heavy ice ridges and at crawling speeds, extensive model testing at Wärtsilä's new ice model test basin showed that the ice resistance could be reduced by replacing the bow propellers with a "clean" hull and adopting an air bubbling system to lubricate the hull. The patented Wärtsilä Air Bubbling System (WABS) onboard Otso consists of three compressors with a combined output of 1,900 kW that pump air through 46 nozzles located below the waterline on both sides of the vessel. At low speeds, the system can also be used for manoeuvering. In addition, she has large ballast tanks and high-capacity pumps that can be used for rapid heeling and trimming to release the icebreaker if she is immobilized by compressive pack ice.

In 1996, Otso was fitted with a bow thruster to assist manoeuvering while the icebreaker was drydocked at Vuosaari shipyard.

== Career ==
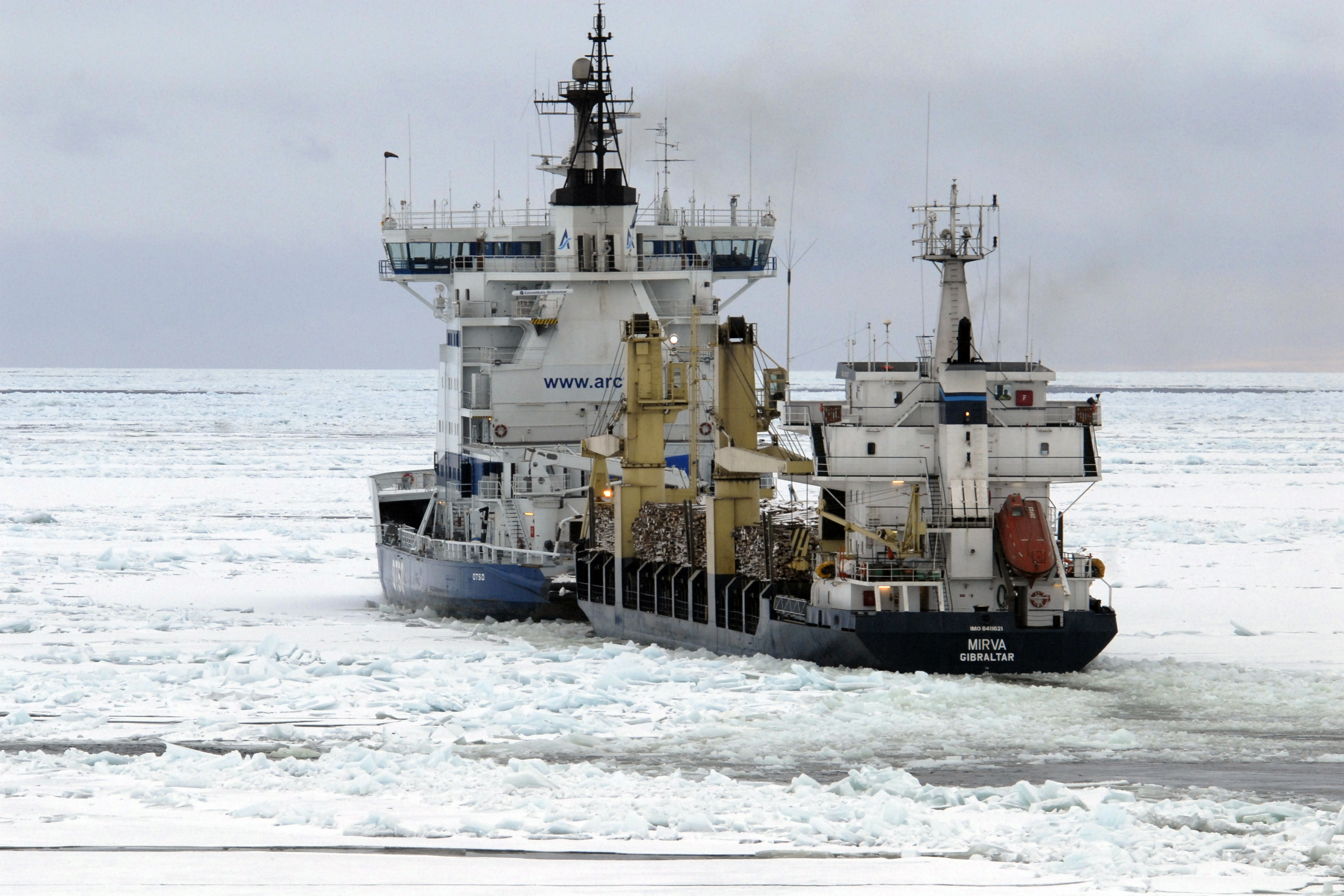
Otso escorting a merchant ship in the Gulf of Bothnia in March 2011. Close towing, in which the escorted ship is pulled to the towing notch of the icebreaker, is commonly used for smaller vessels.

Before Otso entered service in 1986, the Finnish icebreaker captains were sceptical about the ability of an icebreaker without bow propellers to operate successfully in the shallow Finnish waters characterized by heavy ice ridges. However, after the early teething problems and successful ice trials, the opinions changed and the performance of the "Bubbler of the Bothnian Bay" was generally deemed to be satisfactory. Over the years, Otso and her sister ship Kontio have proved to be very cost-efficient and for that reason they are the first Finnish state-owned icebreakers to be deployed for icebreaking in the Gulf of Bothnia every winter.

Until 2015, Otso and Kontio were the last Finnish icebreakers designed solely for escorting merchant ships through iced-over waters. In the 1990s, the Finnish Maritime Administration commissioned three multipurpose icebreakers with a secondary role in offshore construction projects during the summer months. However, due to the criticism of the multipurpose icebreakers and Arctic offshore drilling in general, the new icebreaker that will replace the aging Voima in 2015 will be a traditional one.

In April 2015, Arctia Shipping announced that Otso had been chartered to an unnamed client to support seismic surveys in the Arctic for two years with an option of two additional years. The vessel was upgraded for service in the northern latitudes by increasing her ice strengthening, previously adequate only for icebreaking in the Baltic Sea, to Polar Class 4 (PC 4) which is intended for vessels operating year-round in thick first-year ice which may include old ice inclusions. Furthermore, a 250-cubic-metre (8,800 cu ft) anti-rolling tank was installed to improve her open water characteristics. Other additions included lifeboats to allow unrestricted worldwide service as well as a new helideck. The modifications were carried out by Rauma Marine Constructions. After the summer season in the Arctic, Otso would return to the Baltic Sea icebreaking duty by November as mandated by the icebreaking contract between Arctia Shipping and the Finnish Transport Agency.
