= Aranda (surname) =

Aranda is a surname of Spanish origin. Notable people with the surname include:

- Alejandro Aranda (born 1994), known by his stage name Scarypoolparty, American singer, musician, and reality television personality
- Ana Teresa Aranda (born 1954), Mexican politician
- Ángel Aranda (1934–2000), Spanish actor
- Antonio Aranda (1888–1979), Spanish general
- Ariel Aranda (born 1988), Argentine footballer
- Arturo Aranda (born 1998), Paraguayan footballer
- Carlos Aranda (born 1980), Spanish footballer
- Clara Aranda (born 1988), Swedish politician
- Dave Aranda (born 1976), American football coach, current head coach of Baylor University
- Eduardo Aranda, (born 1985) Paraguayan footballer
- Emmanuel de Aranda (c.1612–c. 1686), Dutch traveler, historian and poet
- Francisco Aranda Millán (1881–1937), Spanish zoologist
- Gabriel Aranda (born 2001), Argentine footballer
- Gilda Aranda (born 1933), Mexican swimmer
- Humberto Aranda (born 1966), Costa Rican boxer
- Idalberto Aranda (born 1975), Cuban weightlifter
- Ingrid Aranda (born 1992), Peruvian karateka
- Jonathan Aranda (born 1998), Mexican baseball player
- Jorgelina Aranda (1942–2015), Argentine actress, television personality and model
- José Jiménez Aranda (1837–1903), Spanish painter
- Juan Aranda (born 1988), Spanish footballer
- Juan Ignacio Aranda (born 1962), Mexican actor
- Julieta Aranda (born 1975), Mexican artist
- Luis Aranda (born 1936), Argentine boxer
- Manuel Aranda da Silva, Mozambican politician
- Mara Aranda (born 1968), Spanish singer
- Nathalee Aranda (born 1995), Panamanian long jumper
- Óscar Aranda (born 2002), Spanish footballer
- Pablo Aranda (footballer) (born 2001), Argentine footballer
- Pablo Aranda (writer) (1968–2020), Spanish writer
- Pedro de Aranda, 15th century bishop of Calahorra
- Pedro Pablo Abarca de Bolea, 10th Count of Aranda (1718–1798), Spanish 18th century statesman and diplomat
- Philip Aranda (1642–1695), Spanish Jesuit theologian
- Ramón Aranda (born 1966), Paraguayan long-distance runner
- Rene Aranda (born 1990), American actress
- Samuel Aranda (born 1979), Spanish photojournalist
- Theodore Aranda (1934–2022), Belizean politician and Garífuna activist
- Vicente Aranda (1926–2015), Spanish film director
