= Atle (1974 icebreaker) =

Swedish icebreaker

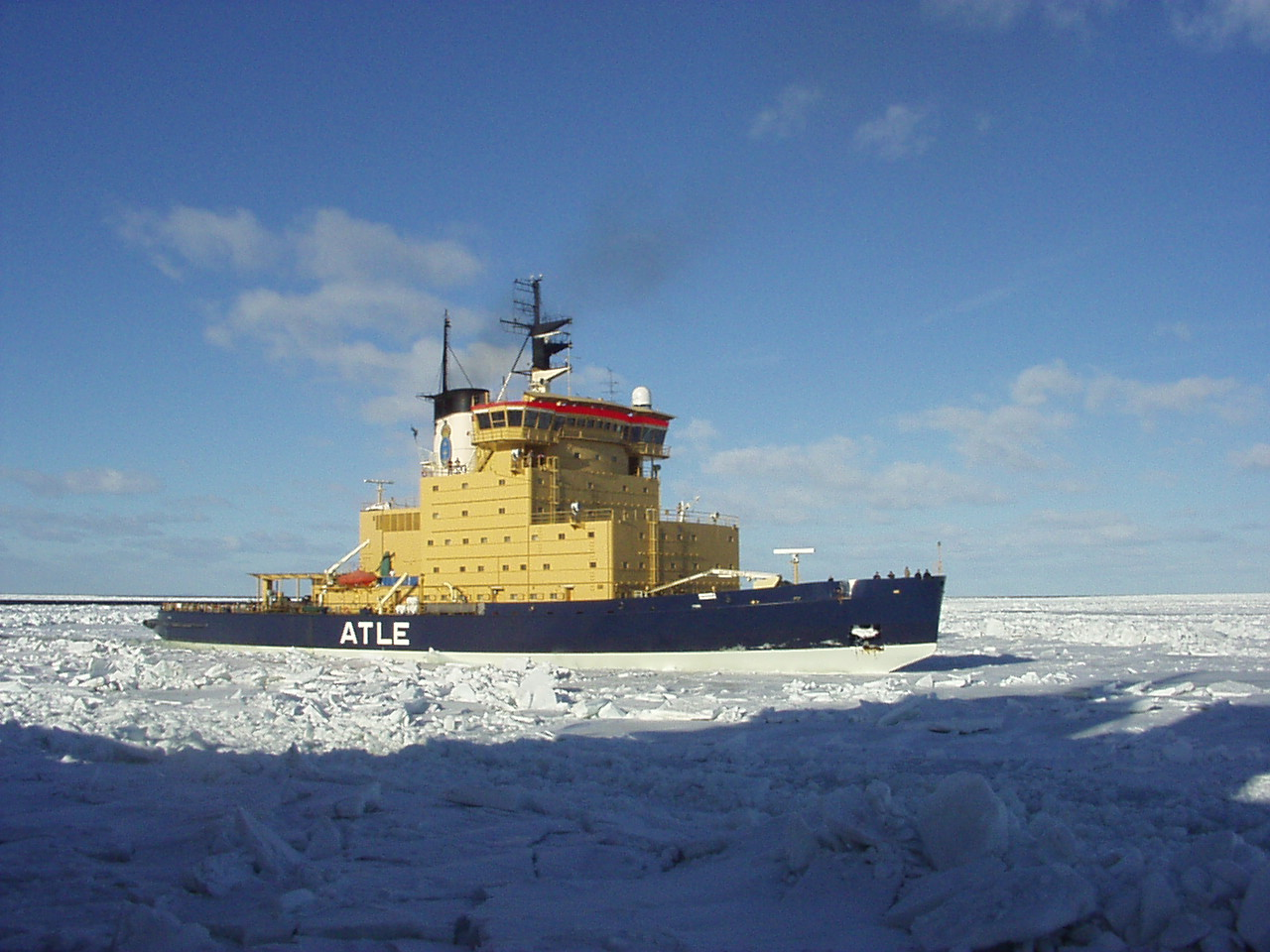

History

Sweden
- Name: Atle
- Namesake: Attila
- Owner: Swedish Maritime Administration
- Operator: Swedish Navy (1974–2000); Swedish Maritime Administration (2000–present)
- Port of registry: Norrköping
- Ordered: 10 May 1971
- Builder: Wärtsilä Helsinki Shipyard (Helsinki, Finland)
- Yard number: 402
- Laid down: 10 May 1973
- Launched: 2 October 1974
- Completed: 21 October 1974
- In service: 1974–present
- Identification: IMO number: 7347627; MMSI number: 265067000; Call sign: SBPR
- Status: In service

General characteristics
- Class & type: Atle-class icebreaker
- Displacement: 9,660 t (9,510 long tons)
- Length: 104.6 m (343 ft)
- Beam: 23.8 m (78 ft)
- Draft: 8.3 m (27 ft)
- Installed power: 5 × Wärtsilä-SEMT Pielstick 12PC2.2V400
- Propulsion: Diesel-electric (DC/DC); four shafts; 16.2 MW (combined)
- Speed: 18 knots (33 km/h; 21 mph) in open water; 3 knots (5.6 km/h; 3.5 mph) in 1.2 m (3.9 ft) ice
- Crew: Accommodation for 61
- Aviation facilities: Helideck and hangar

Atle is a 1974-built icebreaker operated by the Swedish Maritime Administration.

Atle has two sister ships in Sweden (Frej and Ymer) and Finland operates two icebreakers based on the same design (Urho and Sisu).

== Design ==
Atle is 104.6 metres (343 ft) long overall, has a beam of 23.8 metres (78 ft) and a draft of 8.3 metres (27 ft). The large deckhouse has accommodation for up to 61 crew and officers in 27 single and 17 double cabins. Like all Swedish icebreakers at the time, Atle was originally designed to be operated and crewed by the Swedish Navy and had, among other features, armament and ability to lay sea mines.

Atle has a diesel-electric power plant consisting of five twelve-cylinder Wärtsilä-SEMT Pielstick 12PC2.2V400 main engines rated at 5,000 horsepower (3,700 kW) each. Like all Swedish large icebreakers built in the 1950s, 1960s and 1970s, it has four electrically-driven propellers — two in the stern and two in the bow — which have a combined propulsion power of 16.2 megawatts (22,000 hp) with a stern-biased 60:40 power split. This gives Atle a bollard pull of 185 tonnes-force (1,810 kN) and ability to break 1.2-metre (3.9 ft) thick ice at a continuous speed of 3 knots (5.6 km/h; 3.5 mph). Until the construction of the 18-megawatt (24,000 hp) Oden in 1988, Atle and its two sister ships were the most powerful Swedish icebreakers in service.

== History ==
=== Development and construction ===
Atle-class icebreakers were developed together with the Finnish Board of Navigation and Wärtsilä Helsinki Shipyard. The icebreakers were considerably bigger and more powerful than their predecessors to be able to assist even the largest ships expected on both sides of the Gulf of Bothnia during the winter months as well keep the northernmost ports in the Bothnian Bay open through the winter.

Atle was laid down on 10 May 1973, launched on 2 October 1974, and delivered to the Swedish Maritime Administration on 21 October 1974. It is named after Attila as he was featured in the heroic poems of the Poetic Edda as well as a 1926-built steam-powered icebreaker of the same name that was decommissioned in 1967.
