= Oskari Kontio =

Oskari Kontio may refer to:

- Oskari Kontio (politician) (fl. 1924–1933), a Finnish MP
- A character in the 2014 film Big Game

== See also ==
- Kontio (disambiguation)
