= Ymer (1976 icebreaker) =

Swedish icebreaker

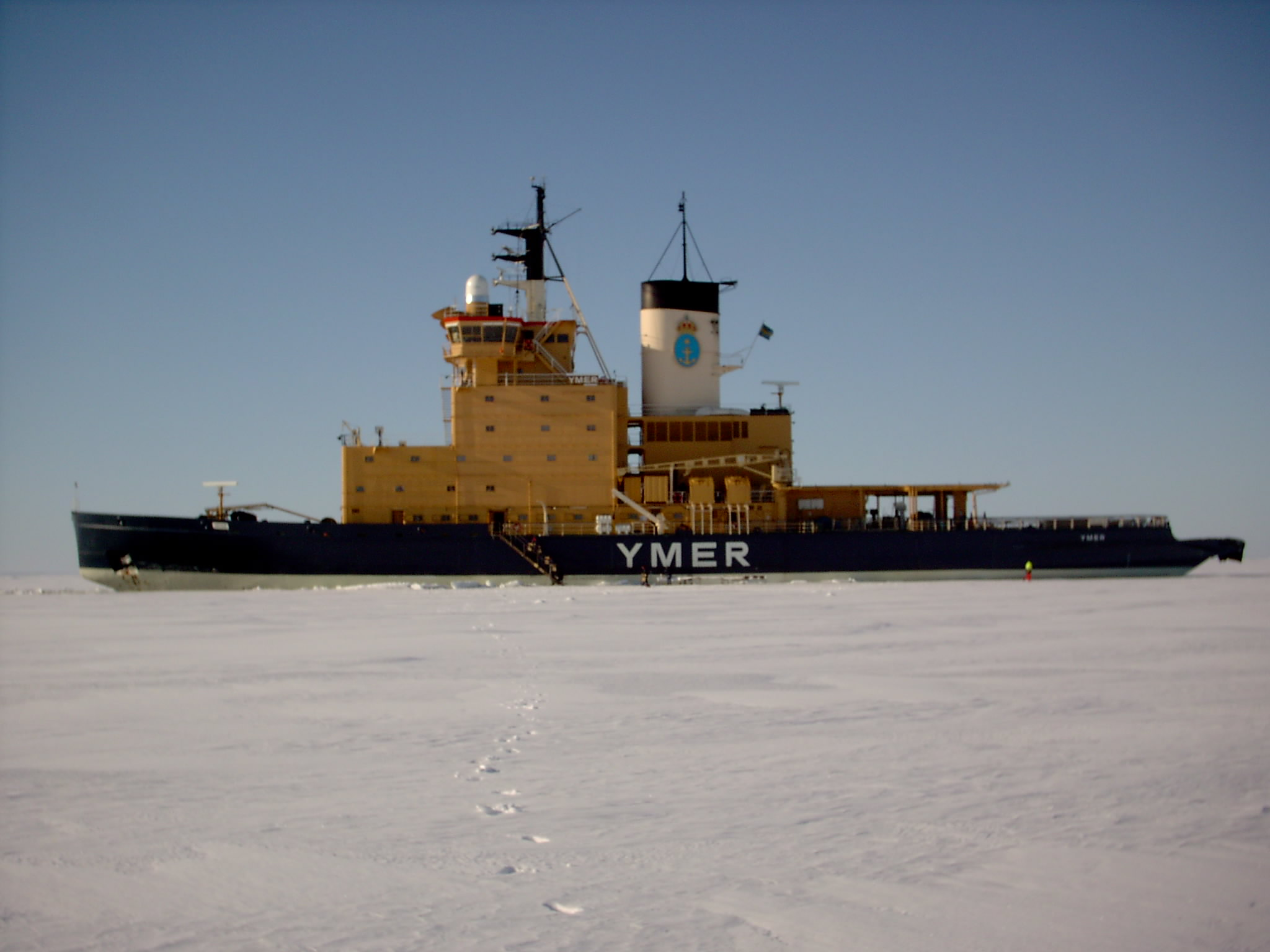

History

Sweden
- Name: Ymer
- Namesake: Ymir
- Owner: Swedish Maritime Administration
- Operator: Swedish Navy (1977–2000); Swedish Maritime Administration (2000–present)
- Port of registry: Norrköping
- Ordered: 24 March 1975
- Builder: Wärtsilä Helsinki Shipyard (Helsinki, Finland)
- Yard number: 413
- Laid down: 17 February 1976
- Launched: 3 September 1976
- Completed: 25 October 1977
- Identification: IMO number: 7505346; MMSI number: 265066000; Call sign: SDIA
- Status: In service

General characteristics
- Class & type: Atle-class icebreaker
- Displacement: 9,660 t (9,510 long tons)
- Length: 104.6 m (343 ft)
- Beam: 23.8 m (78 ft)
- Draft: 8.3 m (27 ft)
- Installed power: 5 × Wärtsilä-SEMT Pielstick 12PC2.2V400
- Propulsion: Diesel-electric (DC/DC); four shafts; 16.2 MW (combined)
- Speed: 18 knots (33 km/h; 21 mph) in open water; 3 knots (5.6 km/h; 3.5 mph) in 1.2 m (3.9 ft) ice
- Crew: Accommodation for 40
- Aviation facilities: Helideck and hangar

Ymer is a 1977-built icebreaker operated by the Swedish Maritime Administration.

Ymer has two sister ships in Sweden (Atle and Frej) and Finland operates two icebreakers based on the same design (Urho and Sisu).

== Design ==
Ymer is 104.6 metres (343 ft) long overall, has a beam of 23.8 metres (78 ft) and a draft of 8.3 metres (27 ft). The large deckhouse has accommodation for up to 40 crew and officers in 30 single and five double cabins. Like all Swedish icebreakers at the time, Frej was originally designed to be operated and crewed by the Swedish Navy and had, among other features, armament and ability to lay sea mines.

Frej has a diesel-electric power plant consisting of five twelve-cylinder Wärtsilä-SEMT Pielstick 12PC2.2V400 main engines rated at 5,000 horsepower (3,700 kW) each. Like all Swedish large icebreakers built in the 1950s, 1960s and 1970s, it has four electrically-driven propellers — two in the stern and two in the bow — which have a combined propulsion power of 16.2 megawatts (22,000 hp) with a stern-biased 60:40 power split. This gives Ymer a bollard pull of 185 tonnes-force (1,810 kN) and ability to break 1.2-metre (3.9 ft) thick ice at a continuous speed of 3 knots (5.6 km/h; 3.5 mph). Until the construction of the 18-megawatt (24,000 hp) Oden in 1988, Ymer and its two sister ships were the most powerful Swedish icebreakers in service.

== History ==
=== Development and construction ===
Atle-class icebreakers were developed together with the Finnish Board of Navigation and Wärtsilä Helsinki Shipyard. The icebreakers were considerably bigger and more powerful than their predecessors to be able to assist even the largest ships expected on both sides of the Gulf of Bothnia during the winter months as well keep the northernmost ports in the Bothnian Bay open through the winter.

Ymer was laid down on 17 February 1976, launched on 3 September 1976, and delivered to the Swedish Maritime Administration on 25 October 1977. It is named after Ymir in the Norse mythology as well as the world's first diesel-electric icebreaker that was built in 1933 and decommissioned in 1977.
