= Kontio =

Kontio may refer to:

- Kontio (icebreaker), a Finnish icebreaker
- A rubber boot model by Nokian Footwear
- A truck model KONTIO-SISU
- Oskari Kontio (politician) (fl. 1924–1933), a Finnish MP
- A character in the 2014 film Big Game
