= Katarina (1953 ship) =

Finnish ship

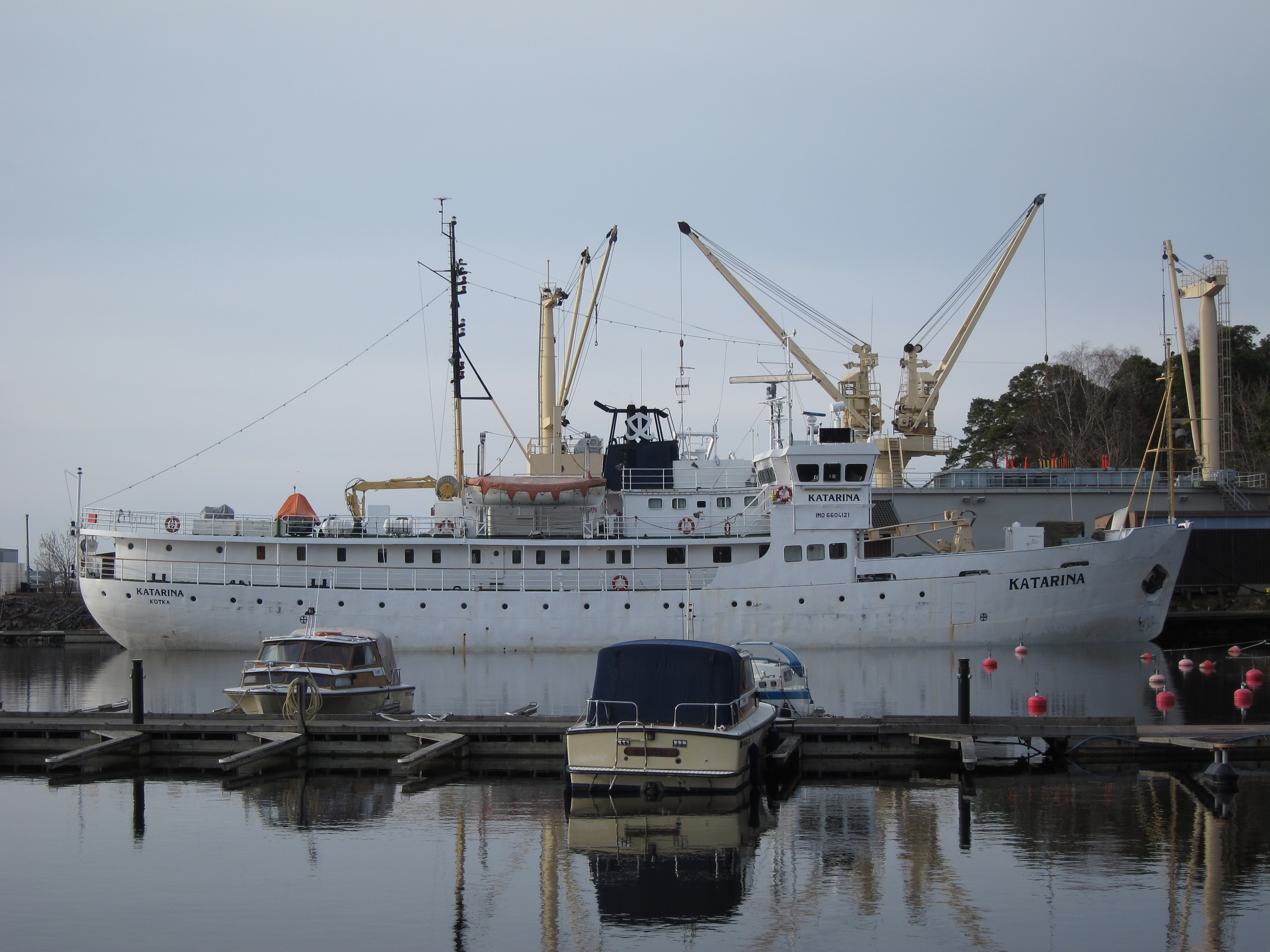
- Katarina in Kotka

History

Finland
- Name: Aranda (1953–1989); Katarina (1989–present)
- Owner: Kotka School of Nautical Studies
- Port of registry: Kotka, Finland
- Ordered: 1949
- Builder: Valmet Oy, Helsinki, Finland
- Launched: 1951
- Completed: 1953
- Refit: 1976, 1983
- Identification: IMO number: 6604121; Call sign: OHLV; MMSI number: 230196000
- Status: In service

General characteristics (1983 refit)
- Type: Training ship
- Tonnage: 905 GRT; 272 NRT
- Displacement: 1,100 tonnes
- Length: 52.80 m (173 ft)
- Beam: 10.48 m (34 ft)
- Draft: 4.80 m (16 ft)
- Ice class: 1A
- Installed power: Wärtsilä-Vaasa 8R22HF (1,180 kW); Wärtsilä-Vaasa 4R22HF (590 kW)
- Propulsion: Diesel-electric (AC/AC); Two propellers (stern 855 kW, bow 630 kW); Bow thruster and stern thruster (both 215 kW)
- Speed: 12 knots (22 km/h; 14 mph)

Katarina is a Finnish training ship of the Kotka School of Nautical Studies. Built by Valmet in Helsinki in 1953 as Aranda, she was the second vessel to bear the name. Until 1989, she served as a transport vessel for the Finnish National Board of Navigation and a research vessel for the Finnish Institute of Marine Research.

== Career ==
In 1949, the Finnish National Board of Navigation ordered an ice-strengthened passenger ship to transport people and cargo to the islands in the Archipelago Sea. The new vessel was launched in 1951 and christened Aranda. She was the second vessel to bear the name after the previous Aranda had been handed over to the Soviet Union as war reparations after World War II. Due to these reparations, the delivery of the vessel was delayed until 1953.

While primarily built as a "winter boat" for the Archipelago Sea communities, but during the summer months she served as a research vessel for the Finnish Institute of Marine Research. During this time, she sometimes ventured outside the Baltic Sea, such as to Svalbard in 1957. In the early 1960s, she was sometimes used as a training ship for maritime schools. She was refitted twice, in 1976 and 1983.

When the third Aranda, a purpose-built research vessel for the Institute of Marine Research, was built in 1989, the old Aranda was renamed Katarina and transferred to the Kotka School of Nautical Studies to serve as a training ship.

== General characteristics ==
Katarina is 52.80 metres (173 ft) long and has a beam of 10.48 metres (34 ft). With a displacement of 1,100 tonnes, she draws 4.80 metres (16 ft) of water. Her hull is strengthened for navigation in ice according to the Finnish-Swedish ice class rules and she carries an ice class of 1A.

Built as an icegoing ship, Katarina was fitted with propellers in both stern and bow. Previously, such propulsion arrangement had been utilized in Finnish icebreakers. Her main engines, a 4-cylinder Wärtsilä 4R22HF and a 8-cylinder Wärtsilä 8R22HF medium-speed diesel generating sets, produce 590 and 1,180 kW of electricity, respectively. The propulsion motors are rated 855 kW (stern) and 630 kW (bow). In addition, Katarina has a bow thruster and a stern thruster, both rated at 215 kW.

When her engine room was rebuilt in 1983, Aranda became a testbed for a diesel-electric propulsion system utilizing cycloconverters and alternating current (AC) propulsion motors. This arrangement was then used in the 1986-built diesel-electric icebreaker Otso and later became de facto standard for large diesel-electric ships.
