= Pedro de Aranda =

15th-century Spanish converso bishop

This person should not be confused with Pedro Pablo Abarca de Bolea, Count of Aranda.

Pedro de Aranda was a Bishop of Calahorra and President of the Council of Castile in the latter part of the fifteenth century, and a victim of the persecutions of Marranos. His father, Gonzalo Alonzo, who was a converso, one of the Jews who embraced Christianity in the period of Vicente Ferrer during the early years of the fifteenth century, adopted the life of an ecclesiastic. Aranda's brother, too, earned episcopal honors, being placed at Montreal, Sicily.

Torquemada, the inquisitor-general, in the course of the Marrano persecutions, brought against Pedro the charge that his father had died a Marrano. A similar accusation was made at the same time against another bishop, Juan Arias Davila, of Segovia. The inquisitor-general demanded, therefore, not only that the bones of the deceased suspects should be exhumed and burned, but that their sons, too, should be disgraced and deprived of their estates.

Pope Sixtus IV, however, resented such summary degradation of high ecclesiastics, fearing that it would lead to the dishonor of the Catholic Church. He further set forth in a letter directed against Torquemada's exaggerated zeal, that, in accordance with an old tradition, distinguished personages of the Church could only be tried for heresy by specially appointed apostolic commissions. It was ordered that specifications of the charges against Davila and Aranda be forwarded to Rome; and an extraordinary papal nuncio, Antonio Palavicini, was sent to Castile to institute investigations.

As a result, both bishops were summoned to Rome, where subsequently several distinctions were accorded to Davila, who during the remainder of his life enjoyed high honors. Aranda, too, at the outset won apostolic favor, and was even advanced to the office of prothonotary; but on account of his wealth, he soon fell a victim to the cupidity of the pope. He was arraigned for having taken food before mass and for having desecrated, by scratching, a crucifix and other holy images. Moreover, a delegation of seven Marranos from Portugal happened to be in Rome at the time for the avowed purpose of purchasing for their constituents the good-will of the pope and his advisers.

They had managed to win the favorable consideration of the papal court, but their efforts were resolutely opposed by Garcilaso, the ambassador of Ferdinand and Isabella. Observing the pope's resolve to imprison Aranda, Garcilaso pointed out the suspicion that was likely to arise in the popular mind from the anomalous incarceration of Aranda while the Marrano delegates, indubitable heretics, were granted favor and freedom. As a consequence, Aranda and five of the Marranos were arrested and thrown into prison; Pedro Essecuator and Aleman Eljurado, the two leading members of the delegation, succeeded in escaping (April 20, 1497). Thus bereft of his worldly and ecclesiastic estate, Aranda ended his days at the Castel Sant'Angelo.
