= Ariel Aranda =

Argentine footballer (born 1988)

Personal information
- Full name: Ariel Maximiliano Aranda
- Date of birth: 22 January 1988 (age 38)
- Place of birth: Lomas de Zamora, Buenos Aires, Argentina
- Height: 1.80 m (5 ft 11 in)
- Position: Forward

Youth career
- San Telmo

Senior career*
Years	Team	Apps	(Gls)
2007–2009	San Telmo	28	(5)
2009–2010	Juventud de Pergamino	7	(0)
2010–2011	Atenas Río Cuarto		
2011	Matienzo Monte Buey	–	(–)
2012	San Luis	9	(2)
2015	Atlético Santa Cruz	–	(–)
2017	Argentino MM	–	(–)
2017	Central Norte	17	(6)
2021	Unión General Acha	–	(–)
2022	Talleres de Ballesteros	–	(–)
2022	Independiente CL	–	(–)
- * Club domestic league appearances and goals

Ariel Maximiliano Aranda (born 22 January 1988) is an Argentine former professional footballer who played as a forward for several Argentine clubs as well as for San Luis de Quillota of the Primera B Chilena.

== Teams ==
- (Argentina) San Telmo 2007–2009
- (Argentina) Juventud de Pergamino 2009–2010
- (Argentina) Atenas de Río Cuarto 2010–2011
- (Argentina) Matienzo de Monte Buey 2011
- (Chile) San Luis de Quillota 2012
- (Argentina) Atlético Santa Cruz 2015
- (Argentina) Argentino de Monte Maíz 2017
- (Argentina) Central Norte 2017
- (Argentina) Unión de General Acha 2021
- (Argentina) Talleres de Ballesteros 2022
- (Argentina) Independiente de Chañar Ladeado 2022
