= Arandas =

Arandas may refer to:

- Arandas (crater), a crater on Mars, named after Arandas, Jalisco

Also, it may refer to the following administrative divisions:

- Arandas, Ain, a commune in the department of Ain, France
- Arandas, Jalisco, a municipio (municipality) and township of Jalisco, Mexico
- Arandas, Guanajuato, a municipio (municipality) in Irapuato, Mexico
