= × Aranda =

Scientific classification
- Kingdom: Plantae
- Clade: Tracheophytes
- Clade: Angiosperms
- Clade: Monocots
- Order: Asparagales
- Family: Orchidaceae
- Subfamily: Epidendroideae
- Tribe: Vandeae
- Subtribe: Aeridinae
- Genus: × Aranda hort.

Genus of orchids

× Aranda, abbreviated in trade journals Aranda, is an intergeneric hybrid between the orchid genera Arachnis and Vanda (Arach x V).
