= Juan Aranda =

Spanish footballer

Personal information
- Full name: Juan Francisco Aranda Rodríguez
- Date of birth: 24 July 1988 (age 38)
- Place of birth: Montemolín, Spain
- Height: 1.79 m (5 ft 10 in)
- Position: Right-back

Youth career
- Fuente Cantos
- Recreativo Huelva

Senior career*
Years	Team	Apps	(Gls)
2006–2011	Recreativo B		
2010–2011	Recreativo Huelva	3	(0)
2011–2012	San Roque	20	(0)
2012	Cádiz	2	(0)
2012–2013	Melilla	16	(0)
2013–2014	Emérita Augusta		
2014–20??	Fuente Cantos		
2021–2022	CB Terlenka	5	(2)
- * Club domestic league appearances and goals as of 1 December 2014

Juan Francisco Aranda Rodríguez (born 24 July 1988) is a Spanish footballer who plays as a right back.

== Club career ==
Born in Montemolín, Badajoz, Extremadura, Aranda graduated from Recreativo de Huelva's youth setup. He made his senior debuts with the reserves, playing several seasons in the Tercera División.

On 19 June 2010 Aranda played his first match as a professional, starting in a 0–4 away loss against Rayo Vallecano in the Segunda División. He subsequently appeared in two further matches in the 2010–11 campaign, and was released in May 2011.

On 21 June 2011 Aranda joined CD San Roque de Lepe in the Segunda División B. On 30 January of the following year he moved to fellow league team Cádiz CF, but appeared rarely for the latter during his six-month spell.

In the 2012 summer Aranda signed for UD Melilla also in the third level. He subsequently resumed his career in the lower leagues, representing EF Emérita Augusta and UD Fuente de Cantos.
