= Sampo (1960 icebreaker) =

Ship

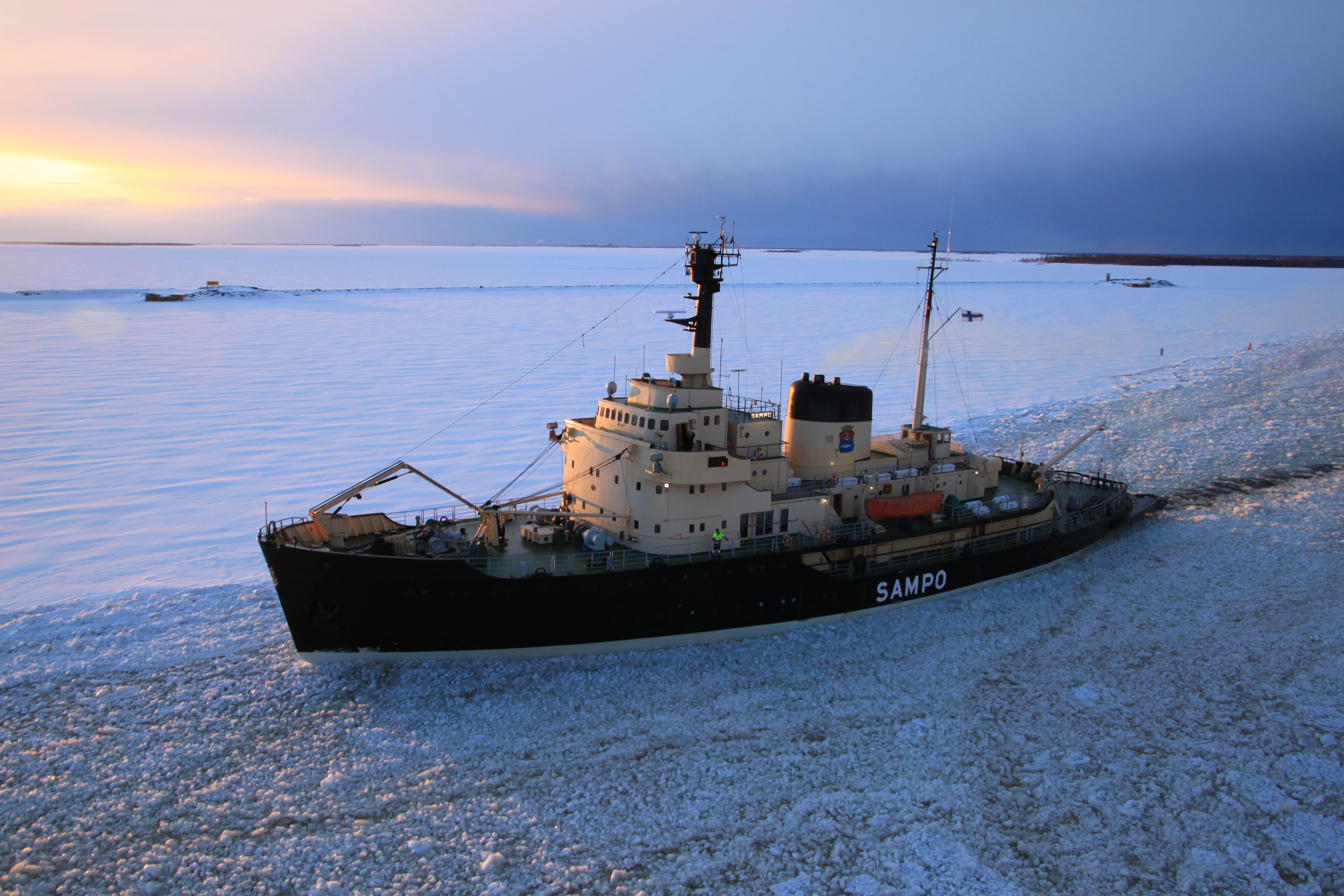
- Sampo at port of Kemi in 2017

History

Finland
- Name: Sampo
- Operator: Kemi Tourism Ltd.
- Builder: Oy Wärtsilä Ab Hietalahti shipyard
- Launched: 9 February 1960
- Completed: 1961
- Homeport: Kemi, Finland
- Identification: IMO number: 5308938; MMSI number: 230990040; Callsign: OIWK
- Nickname(s): Sampo Arctic Icebreaker
- Status: Active

General characteristics
- Type: icebreaker
- Displacement: 3,542 tonnes
- Length: 75.68 m (248.3 ft)
- Beam: 17.40 m (57.1 ft)
- Height: 14 m (46 ft)
- Draught: 7 m (23 ft)
- Decks: 7
- Ice class: 1A Super
- Installed power: 8 main generators with total capacity of 6,000 kW
- Propulsion: 4 engines, two screws
- Speed: 16 knots (30 km/h; 18 mph); 6–8 kn (11–15 km/h; 7–9 mph) in 50 cm (20 in) ice
- Capacity: 180
- Complement: 9
- Notes: Icebreaking capability 80–120 cm (31–47 in) solid ice

Sampo is a Finnish icebreaker built in 1960 in Helsinki and now stationed in Kemi.

== History ==
The Sampo has a long and distinguished service record. The massive vessel, which was completed in 1961, was built to operate in extreme arctic conditions. In the northern part of the Gulf of Bothnia it kept lanes free for shipping for nearly 30 years. Its predecessor of the same name (1898–1960) was the first icebreaker in Europe with a propeller in the bow and stern. The ship is now used for tourist cruises.

The town of Kemi bought Sampo from the National Board of Navigation in the year 1987. The price of the vessel was 19 pennies per kilogram i.e. 1 million Finnish Mark (about €167 000 ). Just by making a purchase decision Sampo got the Finnish Tourist Boards reward of Best Tourism Product of the year 1987.

== Sampo in tourism ==
During the late winter 1988 Sampo started its career in tourism. Sampo made its first cruise 14.4.1988 with foreign and domestic media. In the year 1989 Sampo had 1000 passengers and in 1994 the record was 6000 passengers. While doing tourist cruises Sampo also kept lanes free for shipping in the northern Gulf of Bothnia.

The home port of Sampo is Ajos in Kemi. During the summer time Sampo stays in its home port but during the wintertime it makes tourist cruises in the Gulf of Bothnia. During the cruise tourists have the chance to go down from the icebreaker and float in the sea dressed in arctic rescue dry suits. They can also participate in the guided ship tour and to get to know the icebreaker from the engine room to the bridge. Sampo can take 150 passengers at a time. Yearly Sampo takes about 10000 tourists on cruises, and in total there have been passengers from over 50 countries.
