= Aranda (1989 ship) =

Research vessel built by Wärtsilä Marine

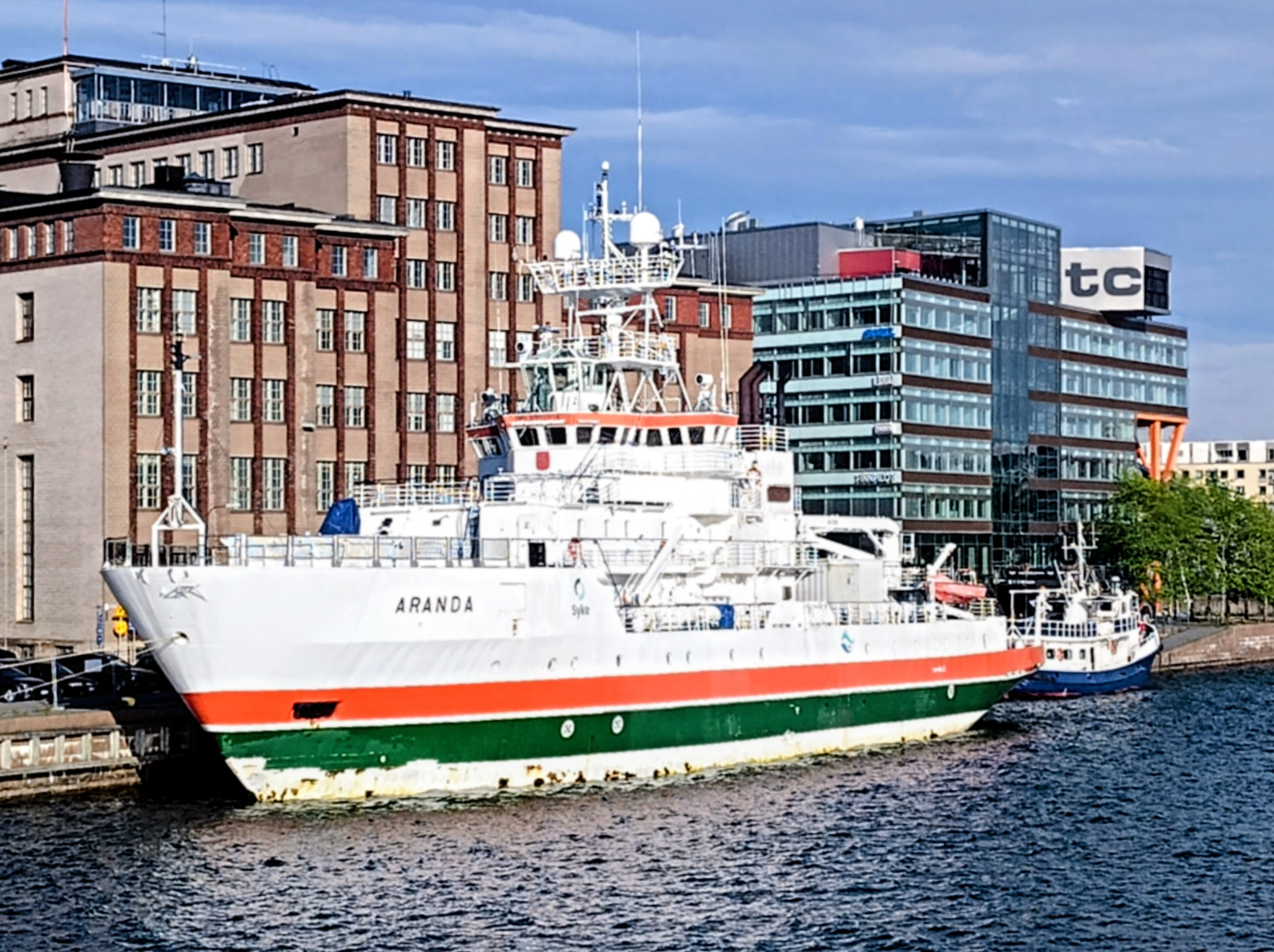
- Research vessel Aranda in port on the Aura River

History

Finland
- Name: Aranda
- Owner: Finnish Environment Institute
- Port of registry: Helsinki, Finland
- Builder: Oy Laivateollisuus Ab, Turku (hull); Wärtsilä Marine Helsinki Shipyard (outfitting)
- Yard number: 406/481
- Completed: June 1989
- In service: 1989–present
- Identification: IMO number: 8802076; Call sign: OIRY; MMSI number: 230145000
- Status: In service

General characteristics
- Type: Research vessel
- Tonnage: 1,734 GT
- Length: 59.2 m (194 ft)
- Beam: 13.8 m (45 ft)
- Draft: 5 m (16 ft)
- Ice class: 1A Super
- Installed power: Wärtsilä Vasa 12V22 (1700 kW); Wärtsilä Vasa 8R22 (1,300 kW)
- Propulsion: Single shaft; ducted propeller; Bow thruster (400 kW); Stern thruster (150 kW)
- Speed: 10.5 knots (19.4 km/h; 12.1 mph) (service)
- Endurance: 60 days
- Crew: 12–13; 25 researchers

Aranda is a Finnish ice-strengthened research vessel built by Wärtsilä Marine in 1989 and owned by the Finnish Environment Institute. A state-of-the-art research vessel equipped for icy conditions, she operates mainly in the Baltic Sea but has also made voyages to the Arctic Sea as well as the areas around Antarctica.

A major overhaul of the ship began in summer 2017, during which the length of the ship was increased to accommodate additional research and laboratory facilities. The vessel was also equipped with electric transmission.
