= Sisu (1975 icebreaker) =

Finnish icebreaker

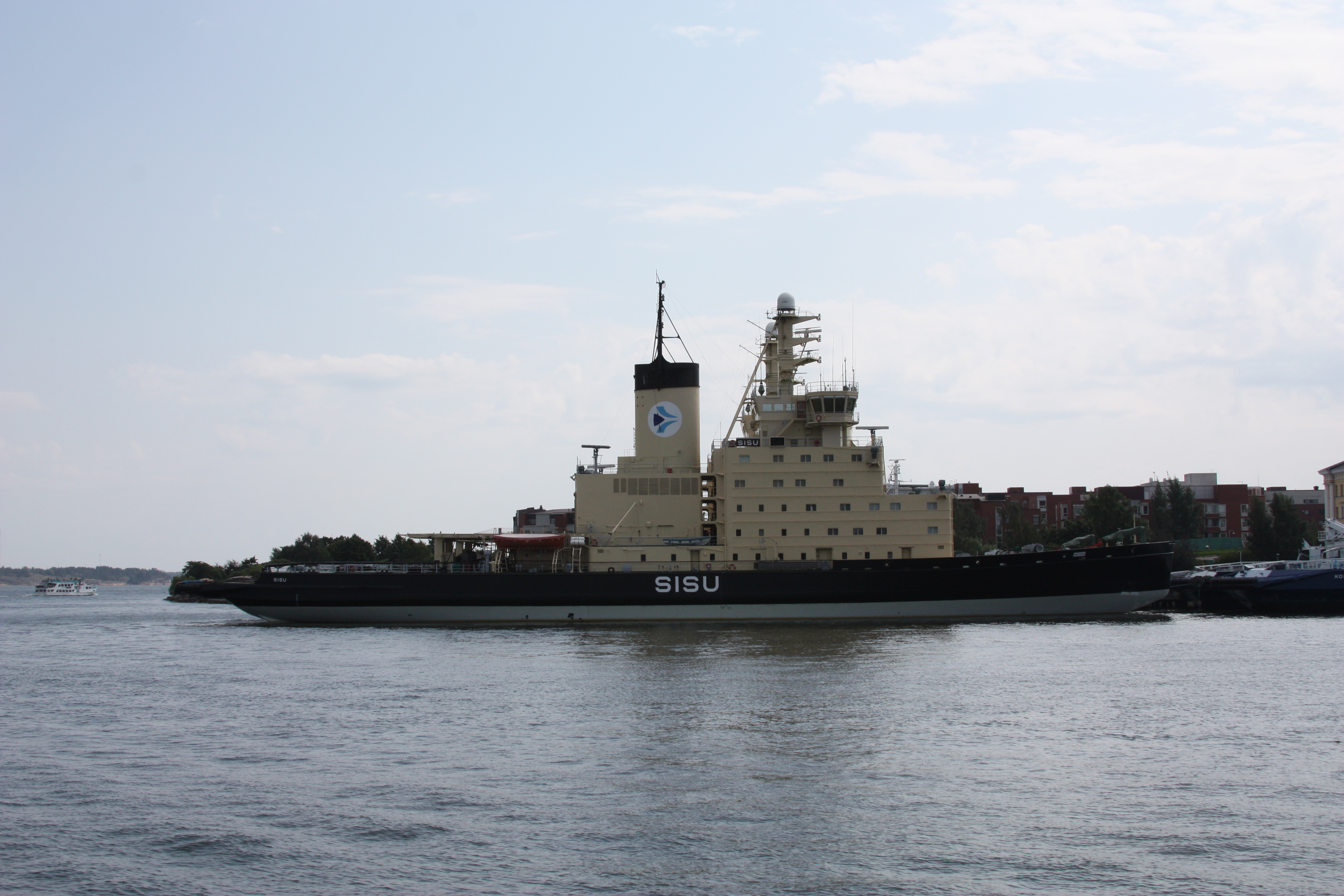

History

Finland
- Name: Sisu
- Namesake: Sisu
- Owner: Finnish Maritime Administration (Note: Finnish National Board of Navigation until 1998.) (1976–2004); Finstaship (2004–2010); Arctia (2010–present)
- Port of registry: Helsinki
- Ordered: 17 April 1971
- Builder: Wärtsilä Helsinki Shipyard (Helsinki, Finland)
- Cost: FIM 67,500,000
- Yard number: 403
- Laid down: 31 December 1974
- Launched: 29 May 1975
- Completed: 28 January 1976
- In service: 1976–present
- Identification: IMO number: 7359656; MMSI number: 230289000; Call sign: OHMW
- Status: In service

General characteristics
- Displacement: 9,660 t (9,510 long tons)
- Length: 104.6 m (343 ft)
- Beam: 23.8 m (78 ft)
- Draft: 8.3 m (27 ft)
- Installed power: 5 × Wärtsilä-SEMT Pielstick 12PC2.5V400
- Propulsion: Diesel-electric (DC/DC); four shafts; 16.2 MW (combined)
- Speed: 18 knots (33 km/h; 21 mph) in open water; 8.5 knots (15.7 km/h; 9.8 mph) in 0.8 m (2.6 ft) ice
- Crew: 45 (as built); 23 (as of 2026)
- Aviation facilities: Helideck

Sisu is a Finnish 1976-built icebreaker operated by the state-owned company Arctia.

Sisu has a 1975-built sister ship Urho. In addition, Sweden operates three similar icebreakers: Atle, Frej and Ymer.

== Design ==
Sisu is 104.6 metres (343 ft) long overall and has a beam of 23.8 metres (78 ft). Fully laden, the icebreaker draws of 8.3 metres (27 ft) of water and has a displacement of 9,660 tonnes (9,510 long tons). When built, the icebreaker had 13 officers and 32 crew with accommodation in the large deckhouse, but today operates with a crew of just 23. In addition to its icebreaking duties, Sisu was built as a training ship for new seamen with nine 3-person cabins and a classroom.

Sisu has a diesel-electric power plant consisting of five twelve-cylinder Wärtsilä-SEMT Pielstick 12PC2.5V400 main engines rated at 5,000 horsepower (3,700 kW) each. Like all Finnish icebreakers built in the 1950s, 1960s and 1970s, it has four electrically-driven propellers — two in the stern and two in the bow — which have a combined propulsion power of 16.2 megawatts (22,000 hp) with a stern-biased 60:40 power split. This gives Sisu a bollard pull of 185 tonnes-force (1,810 kN) and ability to break 0.8-metre (2.6 ft) thick ice at a continuous speed of 8.5 knots (15.7 km/h; 9.8 mph).

== History ==
=== Development and construction ===
Urho-class icebreakers were developed together with the Swedish Maritime Administration and Wärtsilä Helsinki Shipyard. The icebreakers were considerably bigger and more powerful than their predecessors to be able to assist even the largest ships expected on both sides of the Gulf of Bothnia during the winter months as well keep the northernmost ports in the Bothnian Bay open through the winter.

Sisu was laid down on 31 December 1974, launched on 29 May 1975, and delivered to the Finnish Board of Navigation on 28 January 1976. It is named after the Finnish word describing will, determination and perseverance as well as a 1939-built icebreaker of the same name that was handed over to the Finnish Navy.
