= Urho (icebreaker) =

Finnish icebreaker

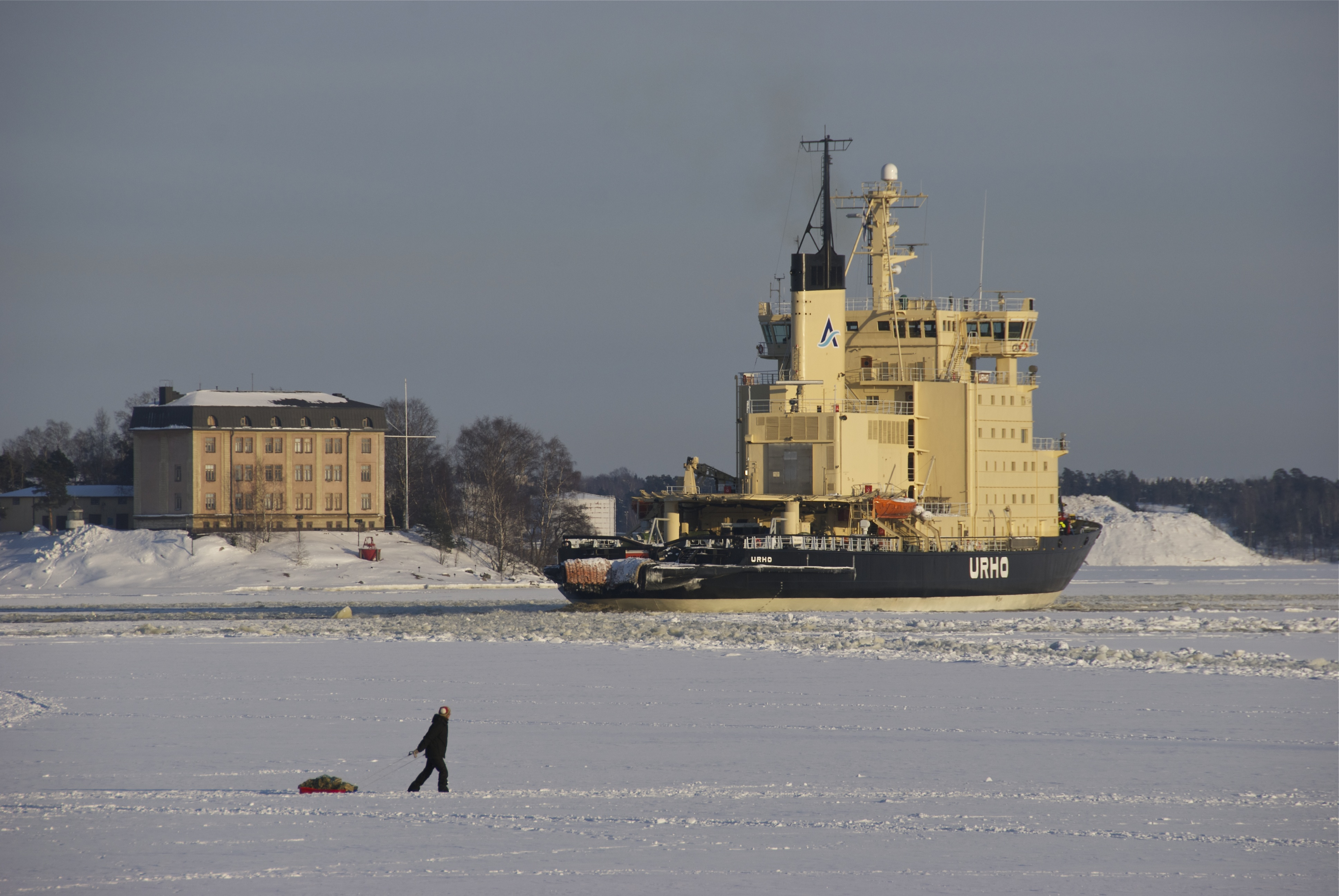

History

Finland
- Name: Urho
- Namesake: Urho Kekkonen
- Owner: Finnish Maritime Administration (Note: Finnish National Board of Navigation until 1998.) (1975–2004); Finstaship (2004–2010); Arctia (2010–present)
- Port of registry: Helsinki
- Ordered: 11 December 1970
- Builder: Wärtsilä Helsinki Shipyard (Helsinki, Finland)
- Cost: FIM 74,800,800
- Yard number: 401
- Laid down: 19 December 1973
- Launched: 30 May 1974
- Sponsored by: Urho Kekkonen
- Completed: 5 March 1975
- In service: 1975–present
- Identification: IMO number: 7347615; MMSI number: 230290000; Call sign: OHMS
- Status: In service

General characteristics
- Displacement: 9,660 t (9,510 long tons)
- Length: 104.6 m (343 ft)
- Beam: 23.8 m (78 ft)
- Draft: 8.3 m (27 ft)
- Installed power: 5 × Wärtsilä-SEMT Pielstick 12PC2.5V400
- Propulsion: Diesel-electric (DC/DC); four shafts; 16.2 MW (combined)
- Speed: 18 knots (33 km/h; 21 mph) in open water; 8.5 knots (15.7 km/h; 9.8 mph) in 0.8 m (2.6 ft) ice
- Crew: 45 (as built); 23 (as of 2026)
- Aviation facilities: Helideck

Urho is a Finnish 1975-built icebreaker operated by the state-owned company Arctia.

Urho has a 1976-built sister ship Sisu. In addition, Sweden operates three similar icebreakers: Atle, Frej and Ymer.

== Design ==
Urho is 104.6 metres (343 ft) long overall and has a beam of 23.8 metres (78 ft). Fully laden, the icebreaker draws of 8.3 metres (27 ft) of water and has a displacement of 9,660 tonnes (9,510 long tons). When built, the icebreaker had 13 officers and 32 crew with accommodation in the large deckhouse, but today operates with a crew of just 23. In addition to its icebreaking duties, Urho was built as a state ship with one accommodation deck dedicated solely for passengers with six large staterooms and a dining room featuring a long 26-person table.

Urho has a diesel-electric power plant consisting of five twelve-cylinder Wärtsilä-SEMT Pielstick 12PC2.5V400 main engines rated at 5,000 horsepower (3,700 kW) each. Like all Finnish icebreakers built in the 1950s, 1960s and 1970s, it has four electrically-driven propellers — two in the stern and two in the bow — which have a combined propulsion power of 16.2 megawatts (22,000 hp) with a stern-biased 60:40 power split. This gives Urho a bollard pull of 185 tonnes-force (1,810 kN) and ability to break 0.8-metre (2.6 ft) thick ice at a continuous speed of 8.5 knots (15.7 km/h; 9.8 mph).

== History ==
=== Development and construction ===
Urho-class icebreakers were developed together with the Swedish Maritime Administration and Wärtsilä Helsinki Shipyard. The icebreakers were considerably bigger and more powerful than their predecessors to be able to assist even the largest ships expected on both sides of the Gulf of Bothnia during the winter months as well keep the northernmost ports in the Bothnian Bay open through the winter.

Urho was laid down on 19 December 1973, launched on 30 May 1974, and delivered to the Finnish Board of Navigation on 5 March 1975. It is named after the Finnish president Urho Kekkonen who was also the ship's sponsor.

=== Career ===
On 4 March 1994, the Finnish cruise ship Sally Albatross ran aground outside Porkkala during the return leg of a 24-hour cruise to Tallinn, Estonia, with 1,101 passengers and 159 crew. Urho was one of the first vessels to arrive to the scene and helped to evacuate 754 passengers and crew from the stricken passenger ship.

==== Notable visitors and publicity events ====
President Gerald Ford and Secretary of State Henry Kissinger being briefed about Urho in the icebreaker's control room

Over the years, Urho has been the venue for a number of state visits and other notable guests.

On 1 August 1975, President Urho Kekkonen hosted President Gerald Ford, First Lady Betty Ford, and Secretary of State Henry Kissinger onboard Urho following the Conference on Security and Co-operation in Europe summit in Helsinki.

On 26 May 1976, Prince Philip visited Wärtsilä Helsinki Shipyard and icebreaker Urho during Queen Elizabeth II's state visit to Finland.

During Rudolf Kirchschläger's visit onboard Urho in March 1977, a freighter loaded with pulp had to wait in ice outside Oulu for half a day while the President of Austria was given a demonstration of the icebreaker's maneuverability.

In May 1980, Urho's visit to Hamburg, Germany was cancelled due to a two-month strike action initiated by the Finnish Seamens' Union and the Finnish Radio Officers' Union in late March.

On 23 May 1981, Urho ran aground while transporting Governor General Edward Schreyer, his wife Lily Schreyer and son Jason to the Neste refinery in Sköldvik. The icebreaker could continue the voyage under its own power despite damage to its bottom plating and bow propellers, and was later repaired at a cost of FIM 5,100,000.

On 11 June 1983, Urho took Prime Minister Indira Gandhi as well as her daughter-in-law Sonia and grandchildren Priyanka and Rahul on a cruise in the Gulf of Finland.

On 10 July 1984, Club of Rome was hosted onboard Urho following the organization's 1984 Helsinki Conference.

On 7 March 1985, President Richard von Weizsäcker and his wife Marianne von Weizsäcker visited Urho outside of Oulu.

In May 1985, Urho made a rare voyage outside of the Baltic Sea when it participated in the opening week of the Sea Finland exhibition at the National Maritime Museum in Greenwich, London. While the first icebreaker ever moored on the River Thames was not open to the general public, it hosted a number of events during its brief stay in the United Kingdom.

On 11 February 2012, a farewell cruise onboard Urho was organized for President Tarja Halonen shortly before the end of her second term. Among the guests were President Giorgio Napolitano of Italy, President Heinz Fischer of Austria, President Andris Bērziņš of Latvia, President Aníbal Cavaco Silva of Portugal, President Danilo Türk of Slovenia and President Pál Schmitt of Hungary, and their spouses.
