= Oden (1988 icebreaker) =

Ship built in 1989

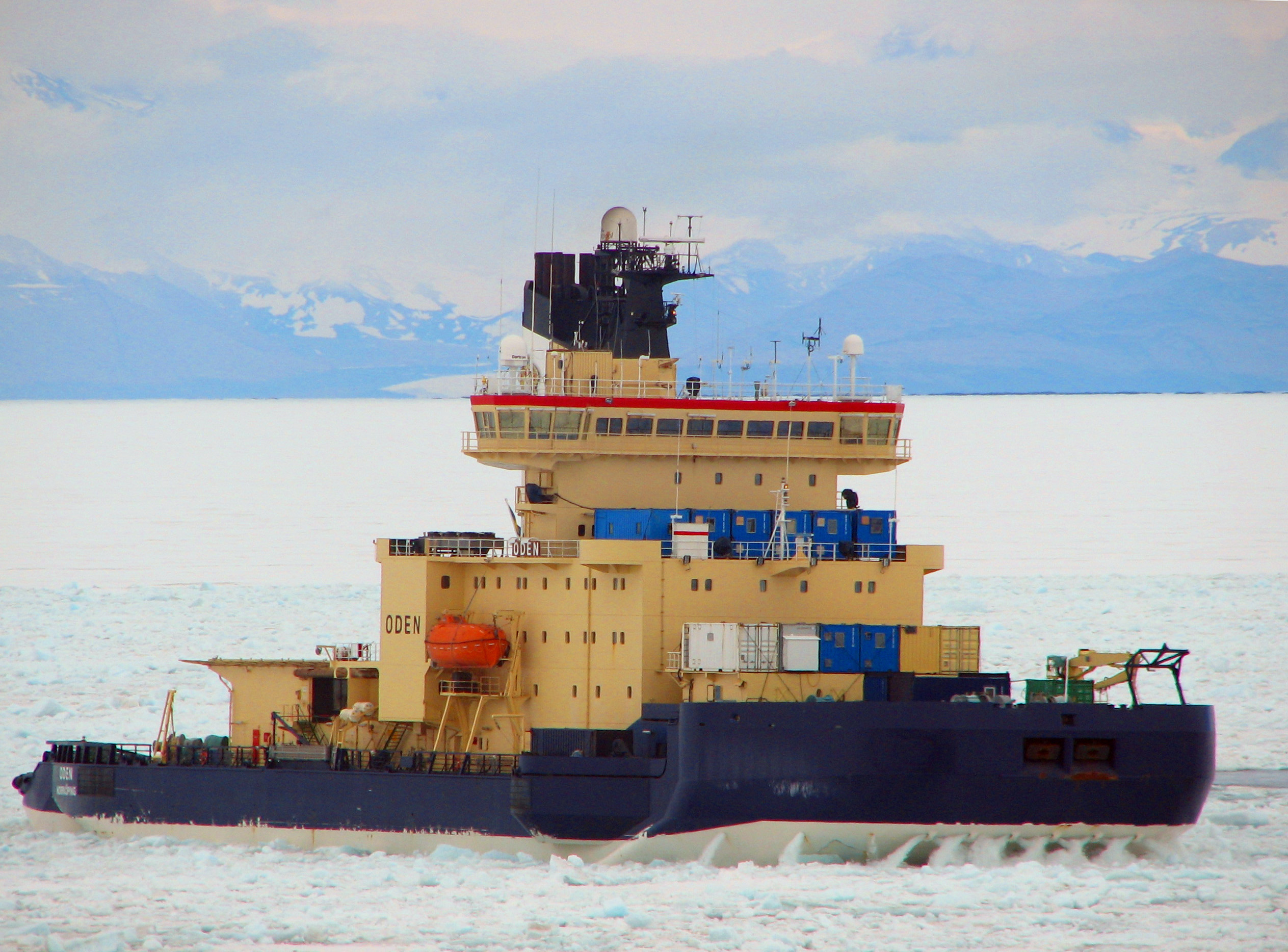
- Icebreaker Oden

History

Sweden
- Name: Oden
- Owner: Swedish Maritime Administration
- Builder: Götaverken, Arendal, Sweden
- Completed: 1988
- Home port: Luleå, Sweden
- Identification: IMO number: 8700876; MMSI number: 265182000; Call sign: SMLQ
- Status: In service

General characteristics
- Type: Icebreaker
- Tonnage: 9,438 GT; 4,906 DWT
- Displacement: 11,000–13,000 tonnes
- Length: 107.8 m (354 ft)
- Beam: 31.0 m (101.7 ft) (max); 25.0 m (82.0 ft) (amidships)
- Draft: 7.0–8.5 m (23.0–27.9 ft)
- Depth: 12 m (39 ft)
- Ice class: DNV POLAR-20
- Installed power: 4 × Sulzer 8ZAL4OS (4 × 4,500 kW)
- Propulsion: 2 × LIPS CPP
- Speed: 16.0 knots (29.6 km/h; 18.4 mph) (open water); 3 knots (5.6 km/h; 3.5 mph) (1.9 m (6.2 ft) level ice)
- Range: 30,000 nautical miles (56,000 km; 35,000 mi) at 13.0 knots (24.1 km/h; 15.0 mph)
- Endurance: 100 days
- Capacity: 65 passengers; 40 TEU
- Crew: 15

Oden is a large Swedish icebreaker, built in 1988 for the Swedish Maritime Administration. It is named after the Norse god Odin. First built to clear a passage through the ice of the Gulf of Bothnia for cargo ships, it was later modified to serve as a research vessel. Equipped with its own helicopter and crewed by a complement of 15, it has ample capacity to carry laboratory equipment and 80 passengers, functioning independently in harsh Polar ice packs of the Arctic and Antarctic seas. It was the first non-nuclear surface vessel to reach the North Pole (in 1991), together with the German research icebreaker Polarstern. It has participated in several scientific expeditions in Arctic and Antarctica.

== Expeditions ==
=== Oden Antarctic Expedition 2007 ===
The joint project was a co-operative endeavor between the Swedish Polar Research Secretariat and the U.S. National Science Foundation (NSF) to collect a range of data in rarely traveled areas of the Antarctic seas and coastline. The international research team studied the oceanography and bio-geochemistry of the region, with emphasis on the processes that control the growth and fate of phytoplankton in the ocean.

=== Oden Antarctic Expedition 2008 ===
From 25 November 2008 to 12 January 2009, an international research team participated in an expedition onboard Oden, collecting a range of data in rarely traveled areas of the Antarctic seas and coastline, including the Amundsen and eastern Ross Seas. They studied production and destruction of greenhouse gases and their effects on sea ice microorganisms. The study was designed to allow future researchers to better understand and monitor the Antarctic region.

=== Oden Southern Ocean Expedition 2009 ===
Oden was in Antarctica during the southern summer 2009-2010.

=== Oden Antarctic Expedition 2010 ===
Oden was in Antarctica between 4 December 2010 and 20 January 2011. The expedition investigated the ice, biology, oceanography, and biogeochemistry of the Amundsen Sea Polynya. There was a controversy that Oden was not assisting the shipping in Swedish waters, which had problems in the unusually cold winter. The Swedish government decided to keep Oden at home for the season 2011-2012 which turned out to be unusually mild.

=== Synoptic Arctic Survey 2021 ===
In August and September 2021 Oden conducted a major Arctic cruise to study the status and change of the Arctic ecosystem. The cruise concluded on 20 September 2021 when Oden arrived at the southern Swedish port of Helsingborg.

=== Other ===
Oden has participated in numerous scientific expeditions in the Canadian arctic archipelago. In 2016 Oden accompanied CCGS Louis S. St-Laurent on an undersea mapping expedition to the Canadian Arctic.
