= List of Kamov aircraft =

Russian aircraft manufacturer

This is a list of aircraft produced by Kamov, a Russian aircraft manufacturer.

== Designs ==
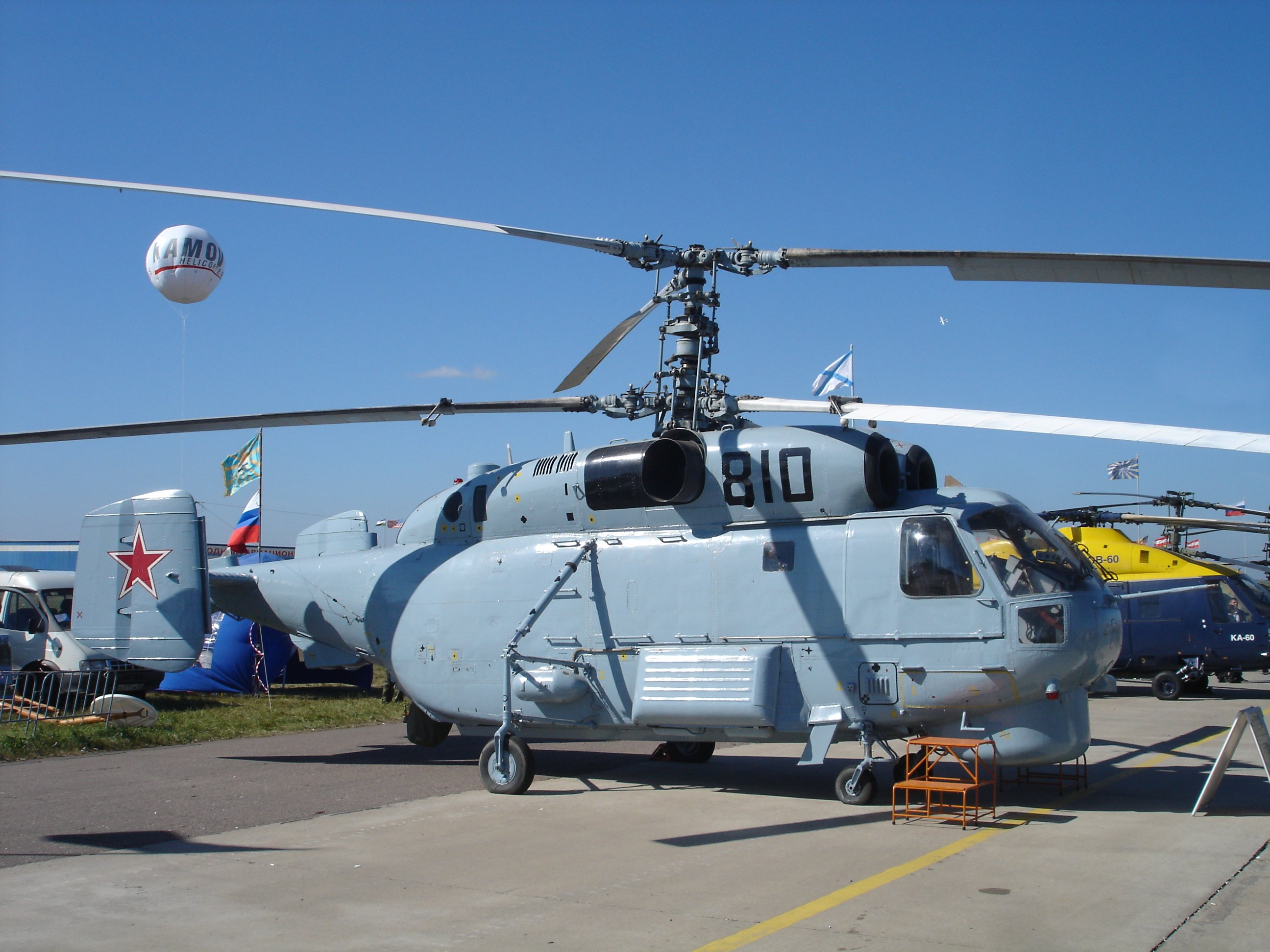
Ka-27

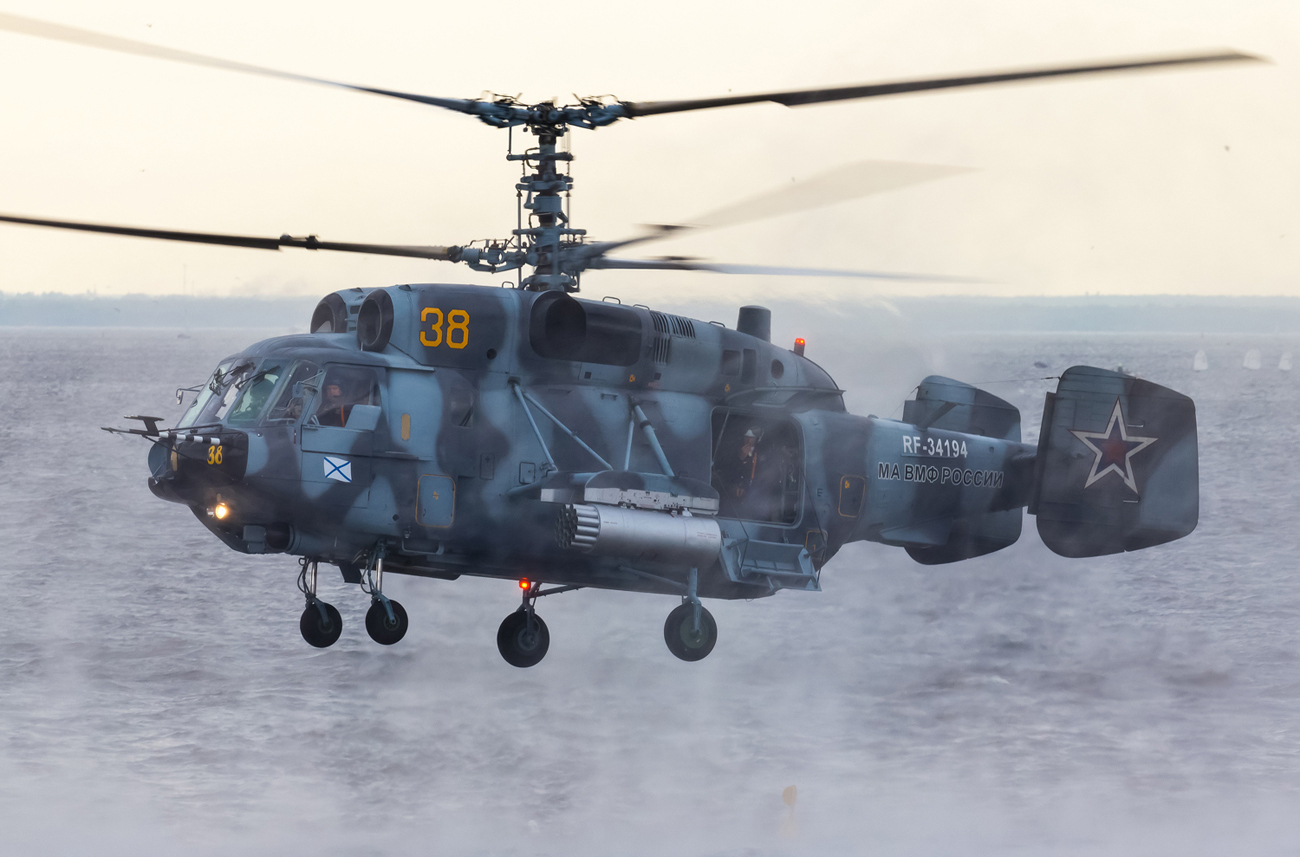
Ka-29

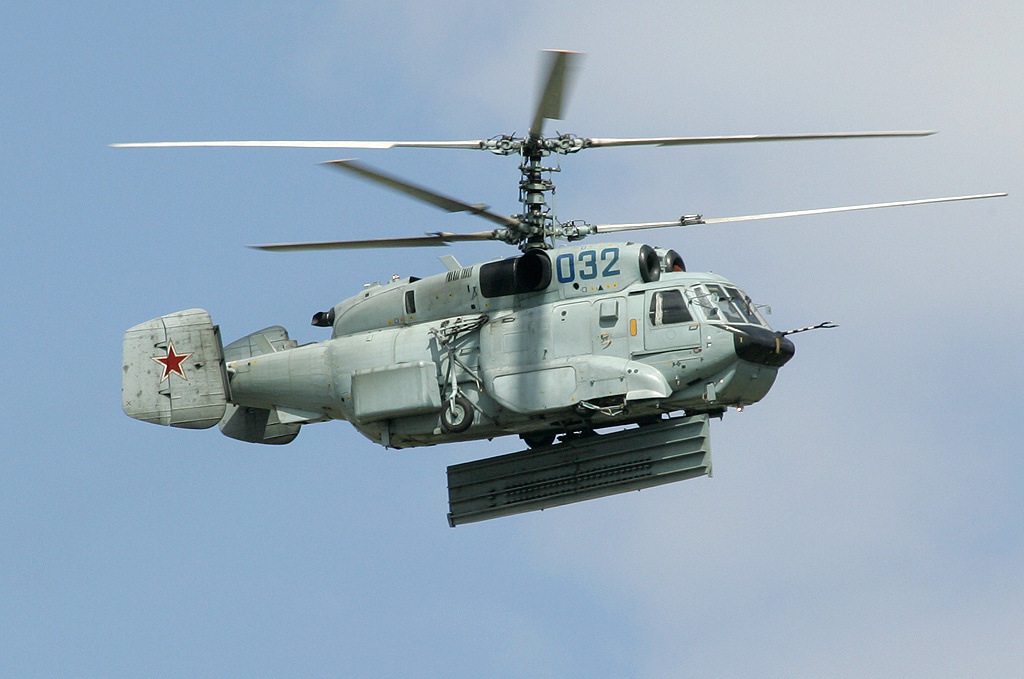
Ka-31

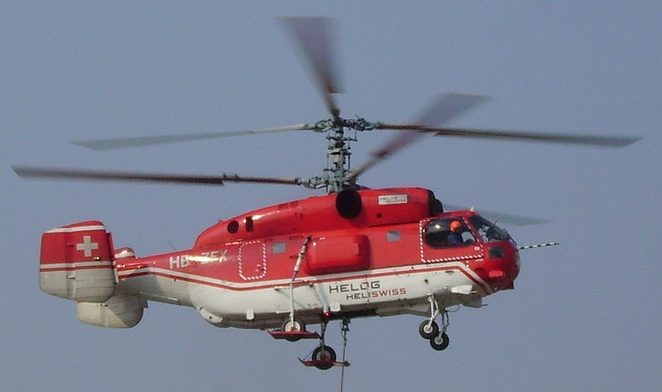
Ka-32

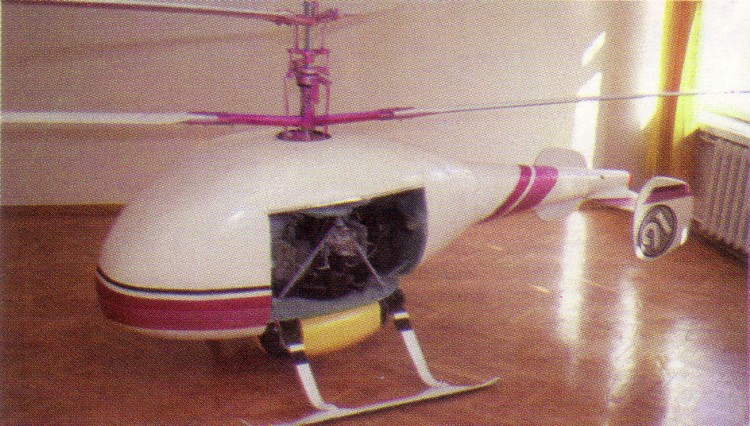
Ka-37

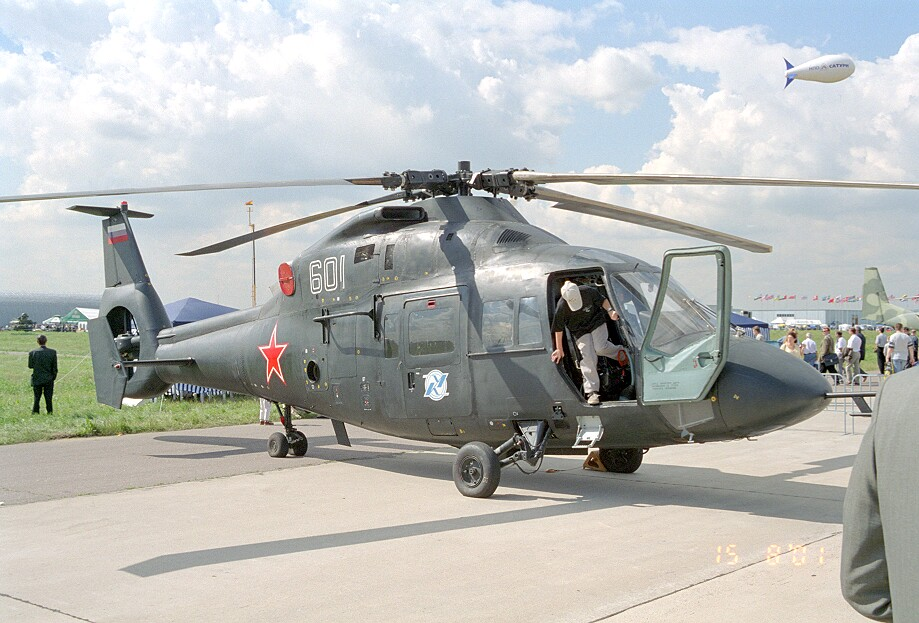
Ka-60

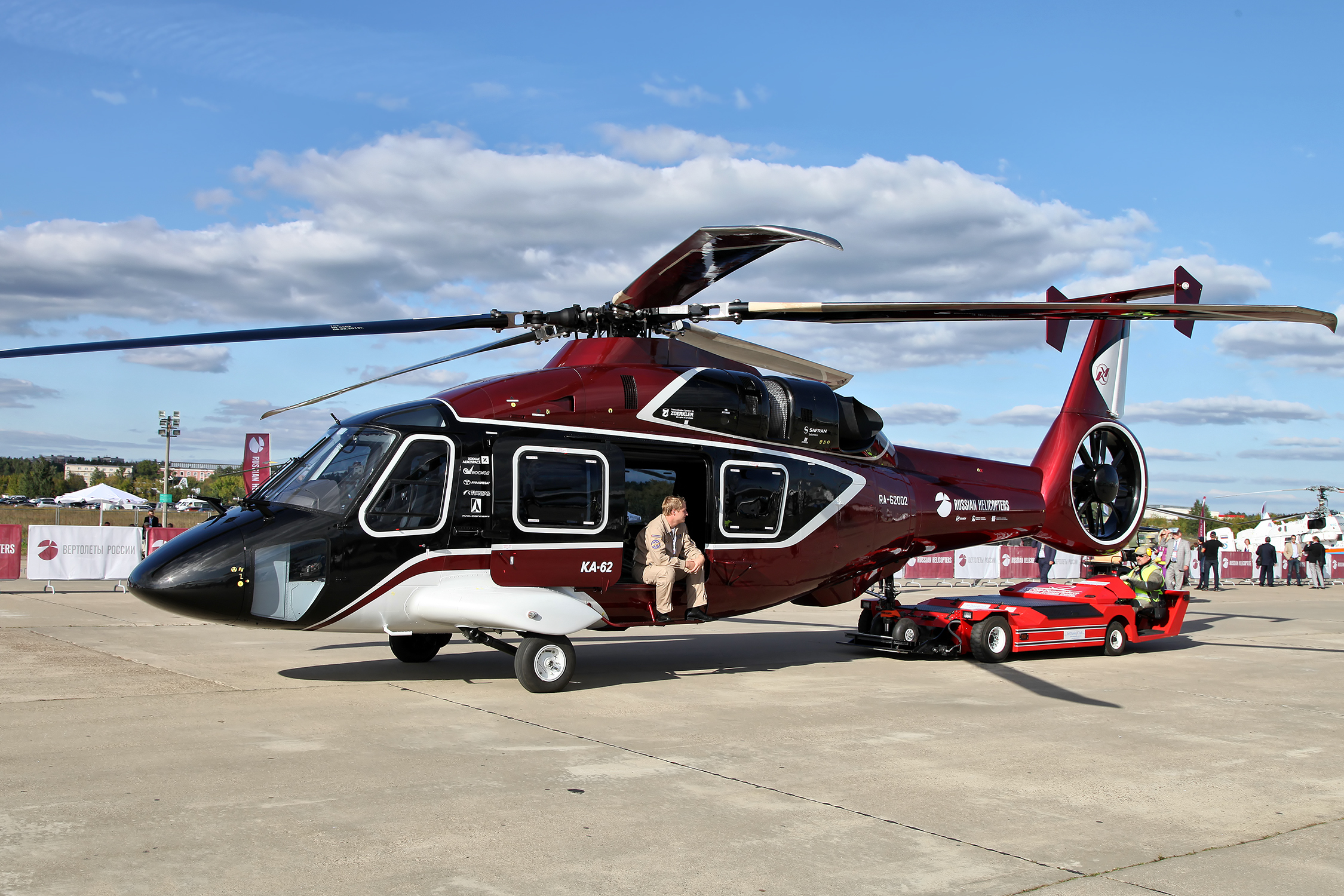
Ka-62

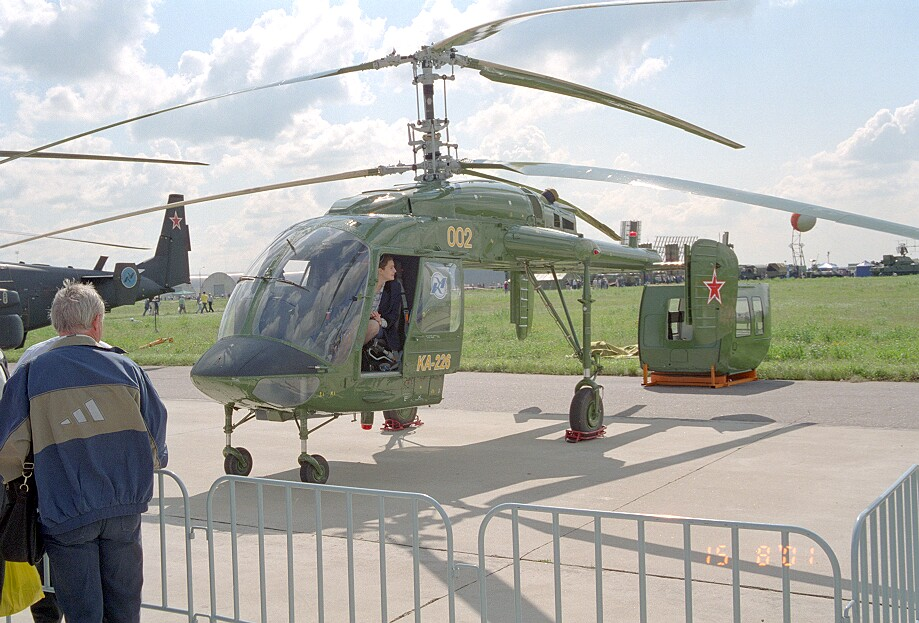
Ka-226

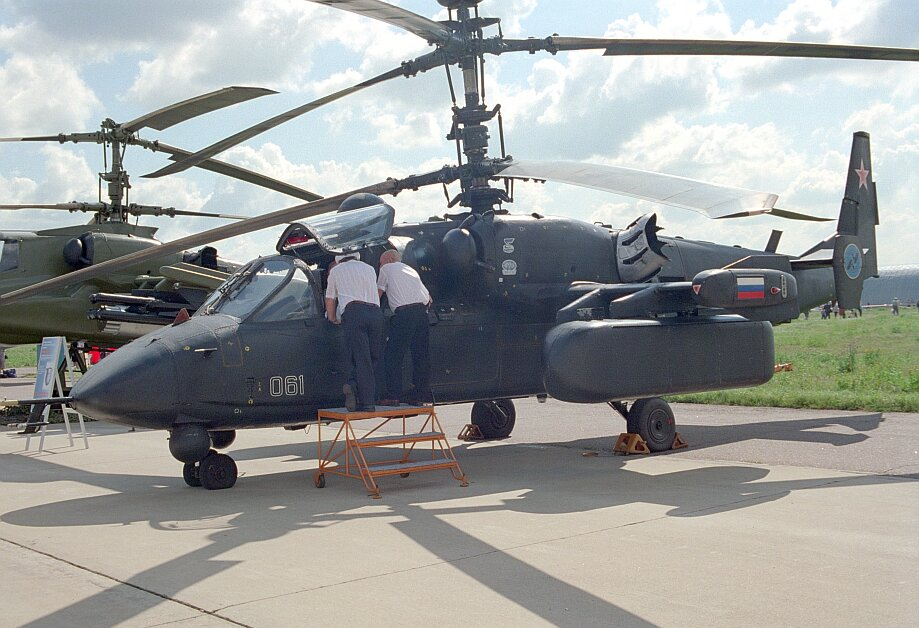
Ka-52

KaSkr-I Gyrocraft 1929
25 September 1929, the first Soviet autogyro, designed by Kamov and Skrzhinskii. Based on Cierva models named The Red Engineer.
KaSkr-II Gyrocraft 1930
Re-engined KASKR-I with a Gnome-Rhone Titan engine.
Kamov A-7 1934
An autogyro primarily used for observation duties.
Ka-8 Irkutyanin 1947
single seat helicopter
Ka-9
Ka-10 1950
Single-seat observation helicopter. NATO reporting name Hat.
Ka-11
small single-seat helicopter
Ka-12
multi-purpose nine-seat helicopter
Ka-14
light multipurpose helicopter
Ka-15 1952
Two-seat utility helicopter. Nato reporting name Hen.
Ka-18 1955
A Ka-15 with a large fuselage and a 280 hp Ivchenko AI-14VF engine. Could carry 4 passengers. 200 units built (approximately). NATO reporting name Hog.
Ka-20 1958
Twin-engine antisubmarine helicopter prototype. NATO reporting name Harp.
Ka-22 Vintokryl 1959
Experimental rotor-winged transport aircraft. NATO reporting name Hoop.
Ka-25 1961
Naval helicopter. NATO reporting name Hormone.
Ka-26 1965
Light utility helicopter. NATO reporting name Hoodlum.
Ka-27 1974
Anti-submarine helicopter. NATO reporting name Helix.
Ka-28
export version of Ka-27 Helix
Ka-29
assault transport version of the Ka-27 Helix
Ka-31
airborne early warning helicopter
Ka-32
civilian version of the Ka-27 Helix
Ka-34
heavy rotary-wing aircraft
Ka-35
heavy jet-powered rotary-wing aircraft
Ka-37 1993
An unmanned coaxial helicopter developed with Daewoo of South Korea initially designed for agricultural tasks. Performances are a max weight of 250 kg ( 50 payload ), speed of 110 km/h, and a flight duration about 45 minutes.
Ka-40 1990s?
anti-submarine helicopter (Replacement for the Ka-27. In development)
Ka-50 "Black Shark" 1982
Single-seat attack helicopter. NATO reporting name Hokum.
Ka-52 "Alligator" 1997
two seat attack helicopter and widely used model
Ka-56
ultralight helicopter for special forces
Ka-60 Kasatka 1990s
Transport/utility helicopter
Ka-62 1990s
civilian transport and utility helicopter
Ka-64 Sky Horse 1990s
naval transport and utility helicopter
Ka-90
High-speed helicopter project.
Ka-92
passenger helicopter
Ka-115 Moskvichka 1990s
light multi-purpose helicopter
Ka-118 1980s-1990s
A NOTAR development - light multirole helicopter
Ka-126 1980s
Light utility helicopter. NATO reporting name Hoodlum-B.
Ka-128
light utility helicopter (one prototype only)
Ka-137 1990s
Unmanned drone/unmanned multipurpose helicopter
Ka-226 "Sergei" 1990s
small, twin-engined utility helicopter
V-50 1960s
A high-speed assault helicopter project with tandem rotors. Cancelled.
V-60 1980s
A light scout and escort helicopter
V-80 1970s
A series of design studies for an attack helicopter (culminating in the Ka-50)
V-100 1980s
Twin-rotor combat helicopter project
Rotorfly R-30 2000s
ultralight coaxial helicopter developed by a different company, but built by Kamov
