= List of NATO reporting names for helicopters =

Helicopters, NATO/ASCC names:

NATO reporting name	Common name
Haitun	Harbin Z-9
Halo	Mil Mi-26
Hare	Mil Mi-1
Harke	Mil Mi-10
Harp	Kamov Ka-20
Hat	Kamov Ka-10
Havoc	Mil Mi-28
Haze	Mil Mi-14
Helix	Kamov Ka-27/29/32
Hen	Kamov Ka-15
Hermit	Mil Mi-34
Hind	Mil Mi-24
Hip	Mil Mi-8/9/17
Hog	Kamov Ka-18
Hokum	Kamov Ka-50/52
Homer	Mil V-12
Hoodlum	Kamov Ka-26/126
Hook	Mil Mi-6
Hoop	Kamov Ka-22
Hoplite	Mil Mi-2
Hormone	Kamov Ka-25
Horse	Yakovlev Yak-24
Hound	Mil Mi-4

== See also ==
- NATO reporting name
