= Kamov Ka-15 =

Soviet utility helicopter

Ka-15
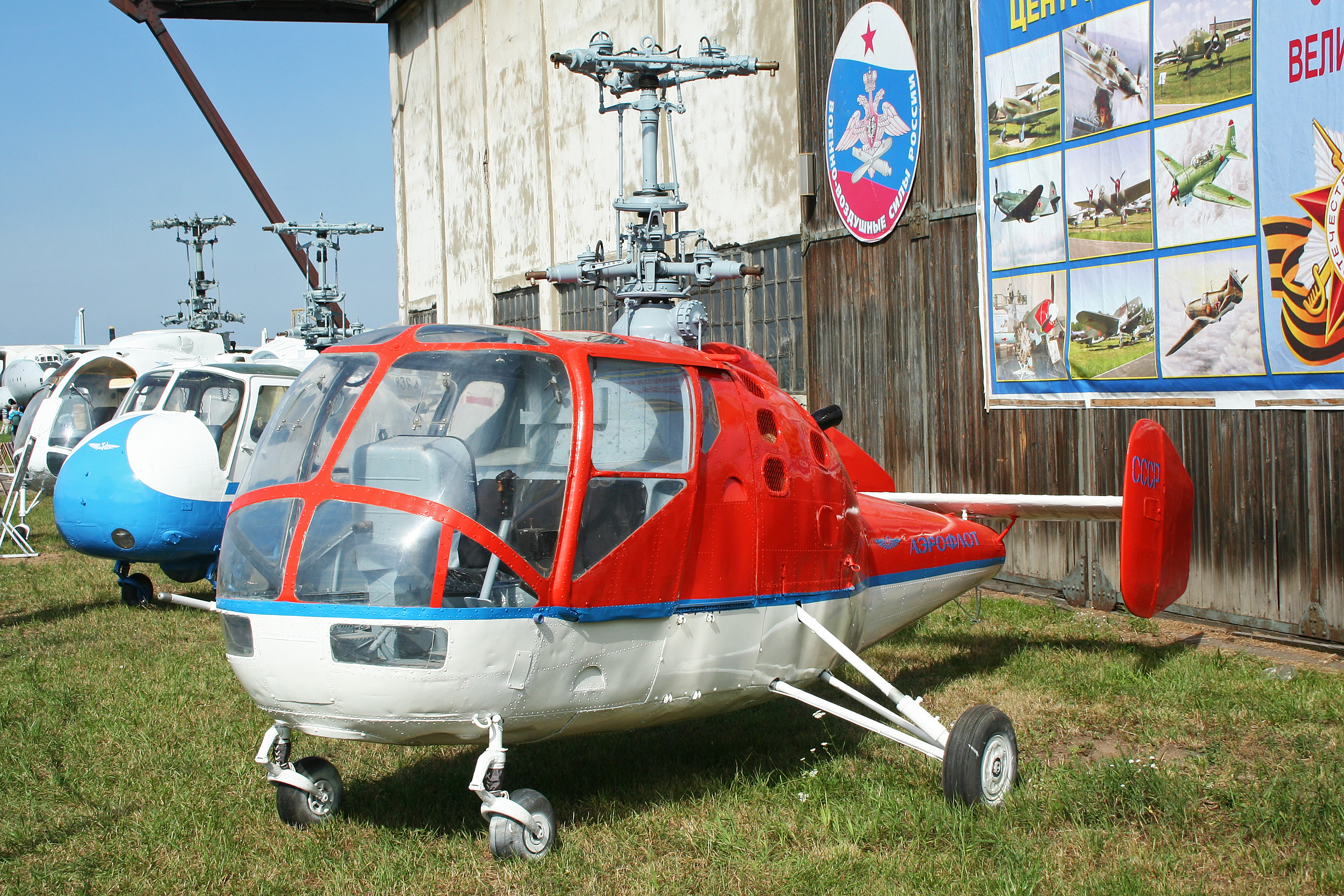
- Kamov Ka-15

General information
- Type: Light utility helicopter
- National origin: Soviet Union
- Manufacturer: Kamov
- Number built: 375

History
- Introduction date: 1955
- First flight: 14 April 1952
- Retired: 1970s
- Developed from: Kamov Ka-10
- Variant: Kamov Ka-18

The Kamov Ka-15 (NATO reporting name Hen) is a Soviet two-seat utility helicopter with coaxial rotors, which first flew on 14 April 1952 at the hands of test pilot D. K. Yefremov. It was the world's first mass-produced coaxial helicopter. State acceptance trials were completed in 1955, and the helicopter entered production the following year at aircraft factory No. 99 in Ulan-Ude. It was a precursor to the Ka-18 and was fitted with the M-14 engine (helicopter version). It was primarily used for bush patrol, agricultural purposes and fishery control.

== Design and development ==
In 1950, after evaluating the single-seat Kamov Ka-10, Soviet Naval Aviation developed a requirement for a larger and more capable two-seat helicopter with an enclosed cabin, but keeping the coaxial rotor layout of the Ka-10. The first prototype of the resulting design, the Kamov Ka-15, entered flight testing in early 1952.

While the Ka-10 was based around an open steel tube framework, the Ka-15 had a more conventional fuselage with a steel-tube structure, with the forward fuselage covered by plywood and the aft fuselage by stressed-skin duralumin. The crew of two sat side-by-side in an enclosed, and extensively glazed cockpit, with the pilot sitting on the left side of the cockpit, and access by sliding doors on either side of the cockpit. A 255 hp (190 kW) Ivchenko AI-14V radial engine was mounted behind the cockpit, and drove the three-bladed coaxial rotors. A twin tail was mounted above the rear fuselage. The aircraft had a fixed undercarriage, with two main wheels and two castoring nosewheels, with a tailskid mounted under the rear fuselage.

== Operational history ==
The Ka-15 entered service with Soviet Naval Aviation in about 1955, carrying out reconnaissance flights from icebreakers as well as liaison and training duties. The type was tested with a dipping sonar, but could not carry the equipment needed to be effective in an anti-submarine role. From 1958, a civil version, the Ka-15M, entered service with Aeroflot. Roles included crop spraying, (with Kamov claiming that the Ka-15 was more efficient than the competing Mil Mi-1), patrolling power lines and pipelines, carrying airmail, and air ambulance.

== Variants ==
Ka-15
Two-seat light utility helicopter for the Soviet Navy.
Ka-15M
Two-seat light utility helicopter. Civilian version of the Ka-15.
Ka-18
Four-seat light utility helicopter.

== Operators ==
Soviet Union

- Aeroflot
- Soviet Naval Aviation

== Specifications (Ka-15M) ==
Data from Soviet Transport Aircraft since 1945

General characteristics

- Crew: 1
- Capacity: 1 passenger / 250 kg (551 lb) cargo
- Length: 6.26 m (20 ft 6 in)
- Height: 3.35 m (11 ft 0 in)
- Empty weight: 990 kg (2,183 lb)
- Max takeoff weight: 1,410 kg (3,109 lb)
- Powerplant: 1 × Ivchenko AI-14V 9-cylinder air-cooled radial piston engine, 190 kW (250 hp)
- Main rotor diameter: 2 × 9.96 m (32 ft 8 in)

Performance

- Maximum speed: 150 km/h (93 mph, 81 kn)
- Cruise speed: 125 km/h (78 mph, 67 kn)
- Range: 390 km (240 mi, 210 nmi)
- Service ceiling: 3,000 m (9,800 ft)
- Disk loading: 9 kg/m^{2} (1.8 lb/sq ft)
- Power/mass: 0.14 kW/kg (0.085 hp/lb)

== See also ==
Related development

- Kamov Ka-8
- Kamov Ka-10
- Kamov Ka-18

Aircraft of comparable role, configuration, and era

- Bell 47
- Mil Mi-1

Related lists

- List of military aircraft of the Soviet Union and the CIS
- List of rotorcraft
- List of Kamov aircraft

== Bibliography ==
- Everett-Heath, John (1988). Soviet Helicopters: Design, Development and Tactics (Second ed.). Coulsdon, UK: Jane's Information Group. ISBN 0-7106-0572-2.
- Gunston, Bill (1995). The Osprey Encyclopedia of Russian Aircraft 1875–1995. London: Osprey. ISBN 1-85532-405-9.
- Stroud, John (1968). Soviet Transport Aircraft since 1945. London: Putnam. ISBN 0-370-00126-5.
- Stroud, Michael (7 October 1971). "Military Helicopter Market". Flight International. pp. 574–581.
- "World Helicopter Market". Flight International. 13 July 1967. pp. 57–71.
