= Kamov Ka-226 =

Russian utility helicopter

Ka-226
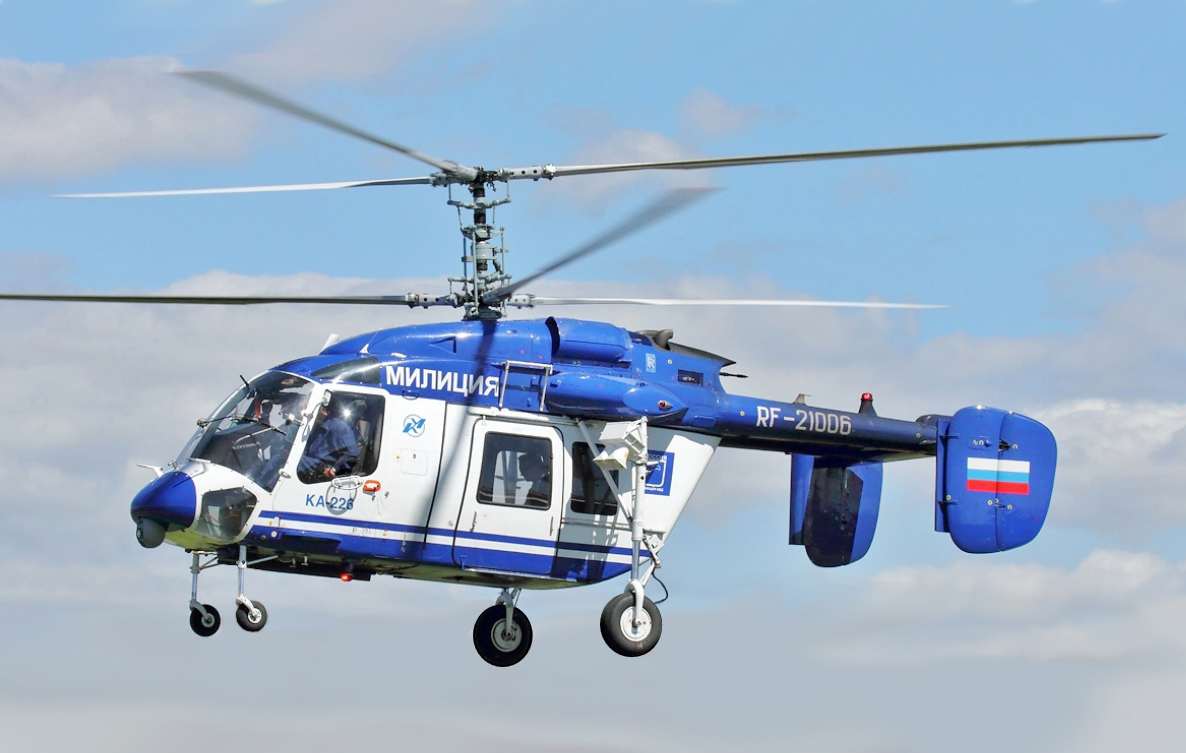
- A Ka-226 of the Russian Police (formerly Militsiya), 2011

General information
- Type: Light utility
- National origin: Russia
- Manufacturer: Kamov
- Status: Active
- Primary user: Russian Aerospace Forces
- Number built: 69

History
- Manufactured: 1996–present
- Introduction date: 2002
- First flight: 4 September 1997
- Developed from: Kamov Ka-126

The Kamov Ka-226 (NATO reporting name: Hoodlum) is a small, twin-engine Russian utility helicopter. The Ka-226 features an interchangeable mission pod, rather than a conventional cabin, allowing the use of various accommodation or equipment configurations. The Ka-226 entered service in 2002.

== Development ==
A twin-turbine version of the successful reciprocating-engined Kamov Ka-26, (the Kamov Ka-126 is the single-turbine version) the Ka-226 was initially announced in 1990. Originally developed to meet the requirements of the Russian disaster relief ministry, the aircraft first flew on 4 September 1997. Certification to Russian AP-29 "A" and "B" transport categories was granted on 31 October 2003. The Ka-226 entered production at "Strela" Orenburg and later in "KumAPP" Kumertau.

Under a 2011 contract with Russian Ministry of Defence, Kumertau Aviation Production Enterprise completed production of a batch of Ka-226.80 helicopters, which was delivered to the customer on 17 April 2015. "The planned scope of the assignment of state contract signed with the Ministry of Defence in 2011 fully implemented with ahead of schedule deliveries. Prematurely delivered a large consignment of helicopters. Previously, under the state contract with the Russian Defence Ministry were also delivered several Ka-226.80 batches", - said the Managing Director of Kumertau Aviation Production Enterprise (KumAPP) Viktor Novikov.

In April 2015 Certification of Ka-226T light multi-role helicopter powered by Turbomeca Arrius 2G engines from France has been successfully completed in Russia. Two Ka-226T helicopters took part in the flight test programme. The version of Ka-226T powered by Turbomeca Arrius 2G engines offers much better performance compared to production Ka-226s powered by Allison 250-C20R/2 engines. It was reported earlier that deliveries of Ka-226 helicopters manufactured by Kumertau Aviation Production Enterprise (Ka-226.50 and Ka-226.80 versions) and powered by Allison 250-C20R/2 engines were started in 2005. The helicopters were delivered to the Federal Security Service of Russian Federation (at least six aircraft), Russian Ministry of Internal Affairs (11 aircraft), Russian Aerospace Forces (a total of 36 helicopters should be delivered) and Ukrainian Ministry of Emergency Situations (one helicopter). Next year the enterprise was to start implementation of a contract for delivery of 18 Ka-226TG helicopters to Gazpromavia. In late March 2017 Russian security structures received first 2 ship-based Ka-226Ts and the delivery of six helicopters was completed in April 2018. In March 2018 Russia issued a supplement to the certificate for Ka-226T helicopter that allows the machine to operate at high temperatures.

=== Further development ===
In March 2026, the first Ka-226T, number 226, equipped with Klimov VK-650V engines began conducting hovering tests. Later, on 22 May, the aircraft made its first full flight from the Mil Moscow Helicopter Plant.

== Design ==
The design is a refinement of the proven Ka-26, featuring interchangeable mission pods. The aircraft is fitted with a new rotor system, increased visibility nose, and new passenger cabin design. The Ka-226 also features a new transmission system and is made largely from composite materials.

The aircraft is fitted with trademark Kamov coaxial rotors, of advanced composite design, making the Ka-226 highly manoeuvrable and eliminating the need for a tail rotor.

== Operational history ==
=== India ===
In December 2014 it was reported that India is in agreement with the Russian Federation to produce Ka-226T and Mi-17 on its territory.

On 13 May 2015, the Defence Acquisition Council, the primary procurement arm of the Indian Ministry of Defence and chaired by the Defence Minister, cleared the procurement and in-country production of at least 200 Kamov Ka-226T 'Sergei' helicopters for the Indian Army (IA) and the Indian Air Force (IAF). This succeeded the then cancelled global tender to procure 197 light helicopters – 133 for IA and 64 for IAF – for reconnaissance and surveillance. The project would be undertaken by a joint venture between Hindustan Aeronautics Limited (HAL) and Russian Helicopters (RH) through a government to government deal. The initial production rate would be 30–40 annually with an envisaged indigenous content of 30% within two to three years of production in India. In August, it was reported that the latter 160 helicopters would be produced in India. The Reliance Group was also interested in the project. The production would be undertaken at the HAL Helicopter Factory, Tumakuru. Between 23 and 24 December, an Inter Governmental Agreement (IGA) for the project was signed by the Russian president, Vladimir Putin and the Indian prime minister, Narendra Modi, in Moscow. A formal contract was expected by the end of 2016.

During the India-Russia Annual Summit on 15 October 2016, the Shareholders Agreement for the establishment of a joint venture to manufacture Ka-226T helicopters in India was signed by the CEO of Russian Helicopters and the CMD of Hindustan Aeronautics Limited. In the joint venture, HAL would hold a 50.5% stake while the RH and Rosoboronexport would control the rest of 49.5%. Further, 60 helicopters would be received in fly-away conditions, 40 would be assembled in Indian facilities and the remaining 100 would be produced in India. The 200 helicopters would be delivered in seven years from contract signing and the maintenance would be undertaken in India.

The Indo Russia Helicopters Limited (IRHL) was incorporated as a joint venture and subsidiary in May 2017. HAL, RH and Rosoboronexport held a stake of 50.5%, 42.5% and 7%, respectively. The authorised capital of the JV was ₹30 crore (US$4.61 million) and paid up capital was ₹10 crore (US$1.54 million). A Request for Proposal (RfP) was 200 helicoters was issued to IRHL by the defence ministry following the formation of the joint venture. The RfP urged an indigenous content of 70%. The first batch of 60 would be imported directly from the Ulan-Ude Aviation Plant of RH while the rest would be assembled in India with kits from Ulan-Ude.

However, the contract was yet to be signed in February 2020 due to cost and indigenous content disputes which were being "resolved". IRHL had recently resubmitted details about the localisation of the helicopter which was sought by the defence ministry. The IRHL planned the localisation in four phases — 3.3% in Phase 1 for 35 helicopters, 15% in Phase 2 for 25 helicopters, 35% in Phase 3 for 30 helicopters, and 62.4% for Phase 4 in the final batch of 50 helicopters. The first helicopter would be delivered in 36 months of contract signing and the deal would be executed in eight years. The engine was of French origin with 74% Russian content and 26% European content. A agreement for a roadmap of the localisation project of Ka-226T was signed during DefExpo 2020. RH was also signing agreements with Indian companies to acquire spares and components.

By November 2021, the Ka-226T purchase had been put on hold due to cost and indigenous content disputes; by August 2022, it was stated that geopolitical factors following the Russo-Ukrainian war from 2022 the deal was expected to be dropped. The Ka-226T deal was cancelled by November 2023.

== Variants ==
The Kamov Ka-226 is available in the following variants; search and rescue, medevac, disaster relief and patrol variants have been developed for the EMERCOM of Russia. Air ambulance, police and fire fighting variants have been developed for the Russian government.

Ka-226
Utility helicopter.

Ka-226AG
Gazpromavia specific variant.

Ka-226T
Instead of Rolls-Royce 250C engines, this variant is fitted with the more powerful Turbomeca Arrius 2G1. Each engine provides 670 shp, increasing the service ceiling to around 7,000 m, providing improved high altitude and high temperature operation. This model has new avionics with multifunctional displays, automatic control system, navigation system, and radar. It can be equipped with a hoist system, sling, searchlight, and an additional external fuel tank. For search and rescue missions helicopter can be equipped with medical module.

Ka-226TG
Gazprom specific variant based on Ka-226T model.

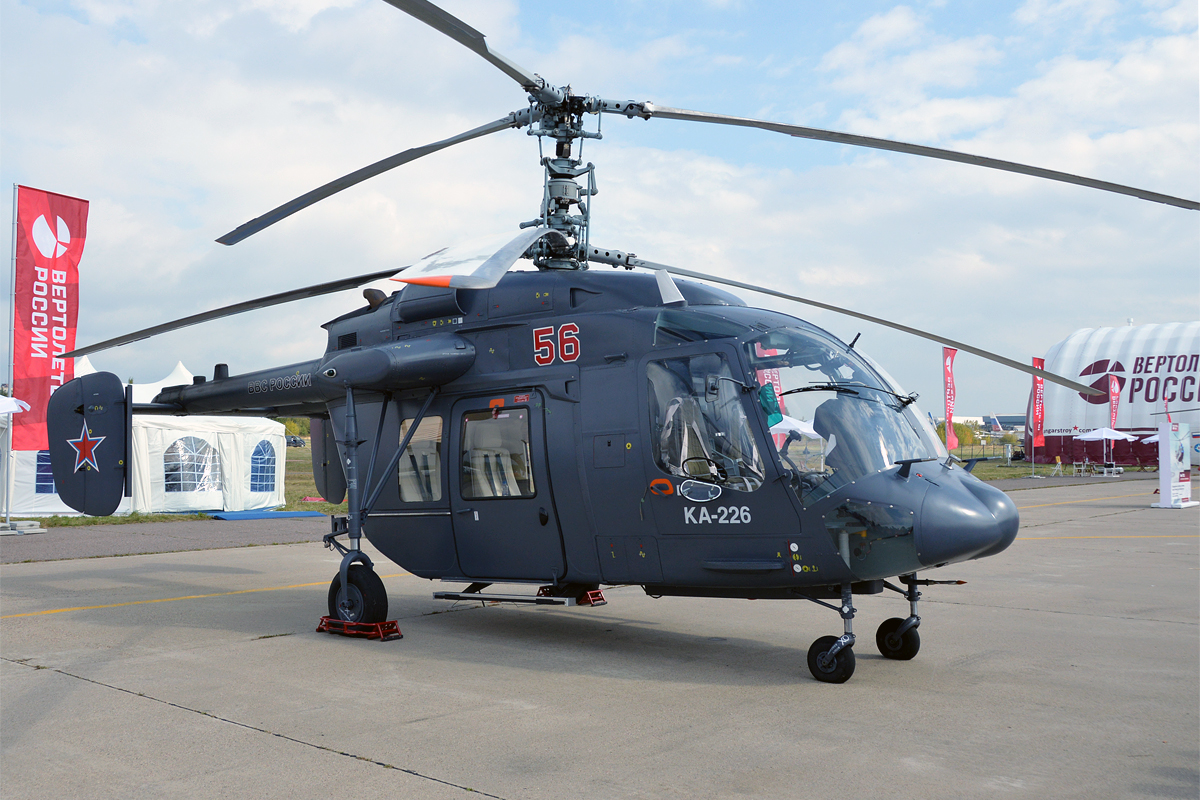
A Russian Air Force Ka-226, 2015

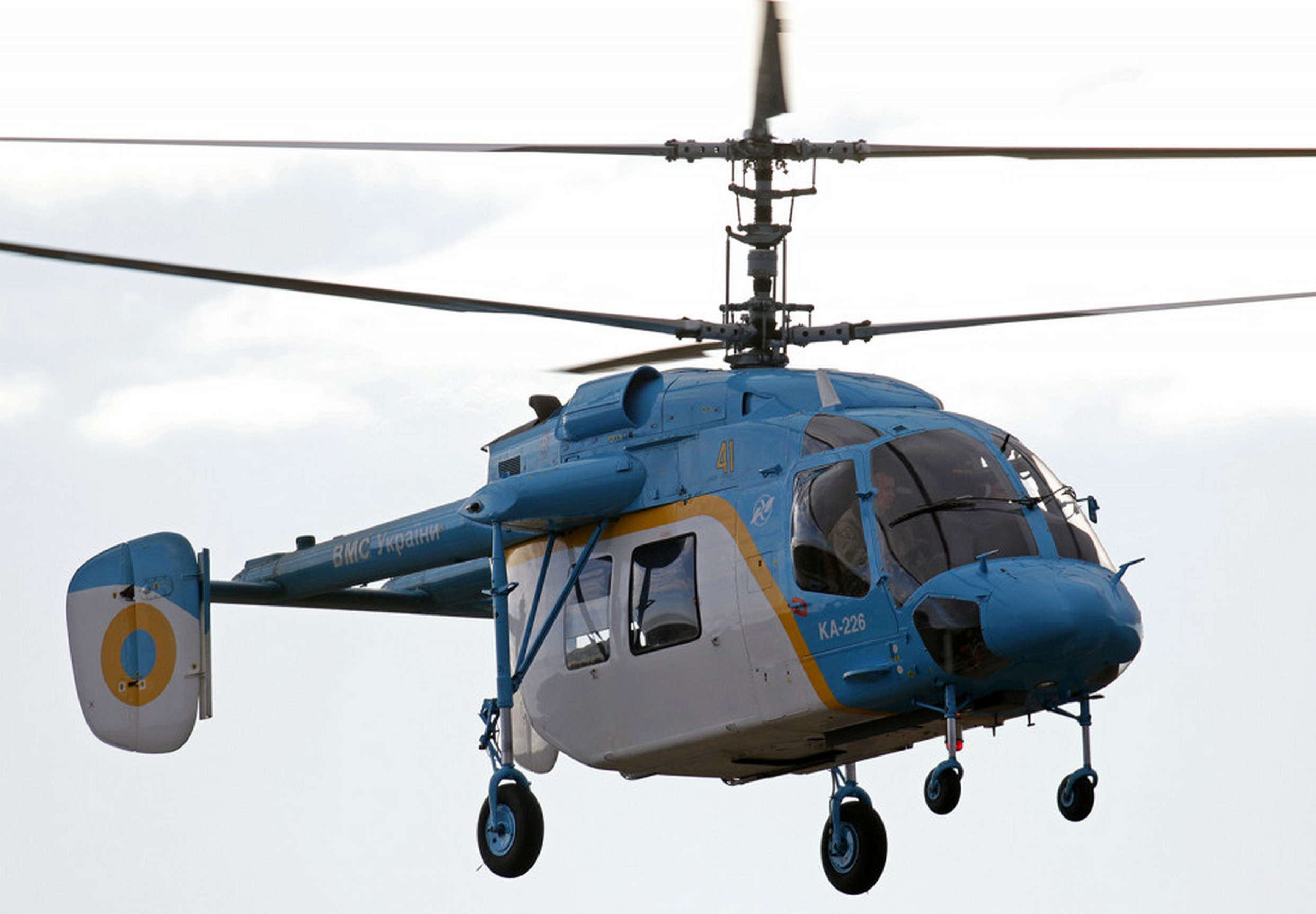
A Ukrainian Naval Aviation Ka-226, 2019

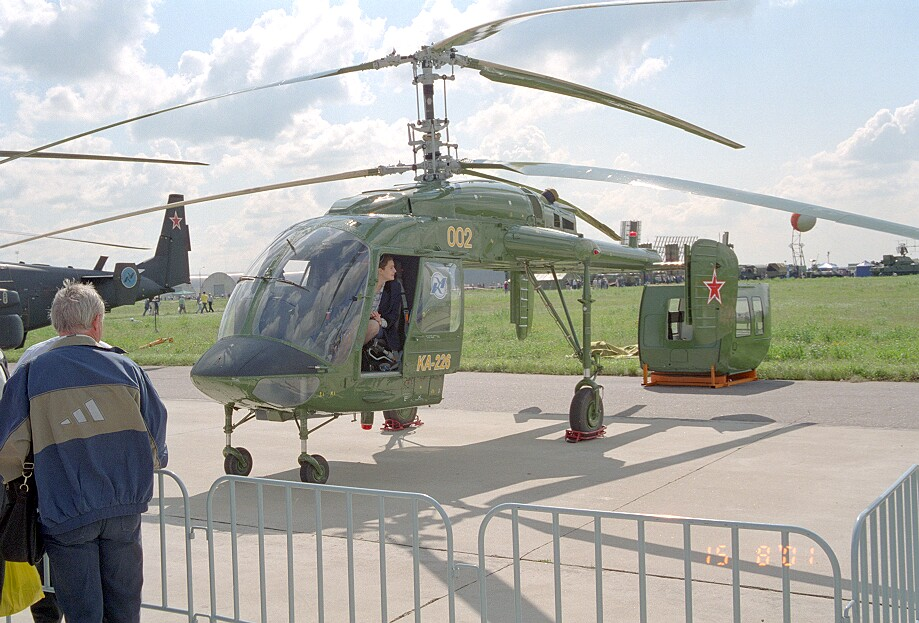
A Kamov Ka-226 without a cargo module and its cargo module (background) at the MAKS 2001 International Aviation and Space Salon

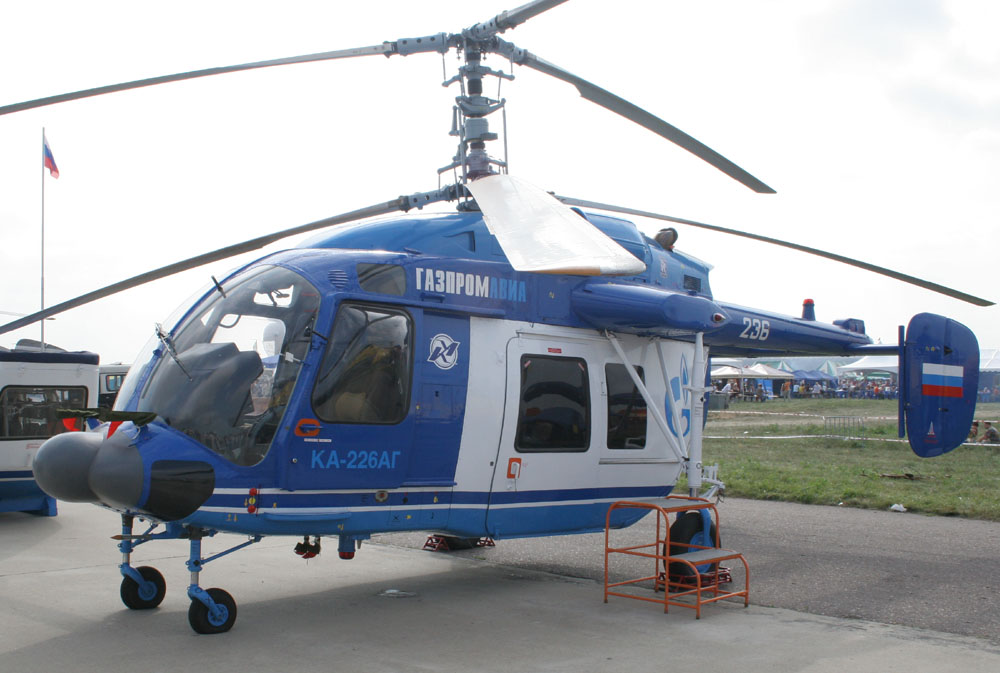
A Gazpromavia Ka-226AG at MAKS 2007

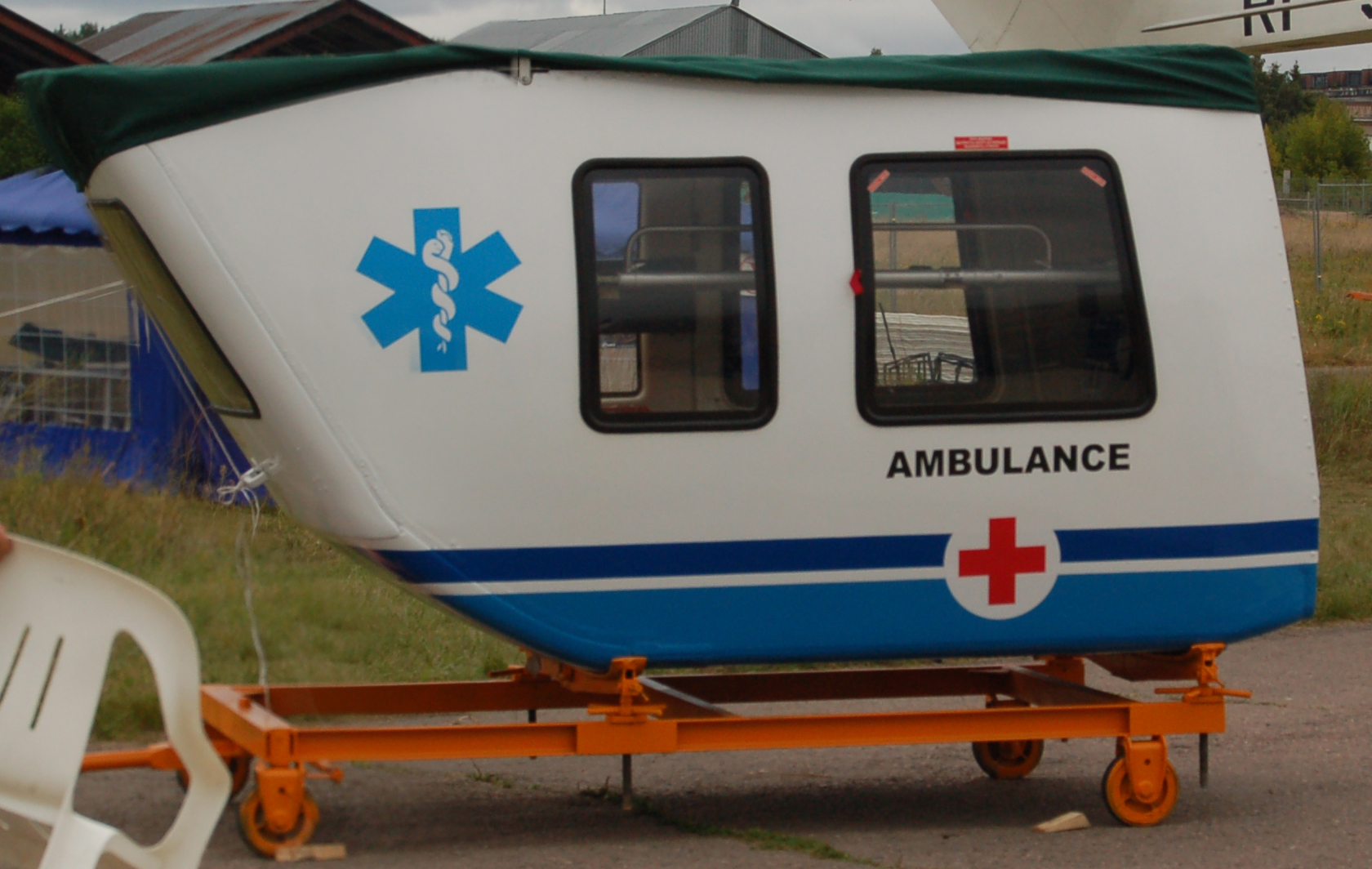
A detached ambulance cargo module for a Ka-226 at MAKS 2009

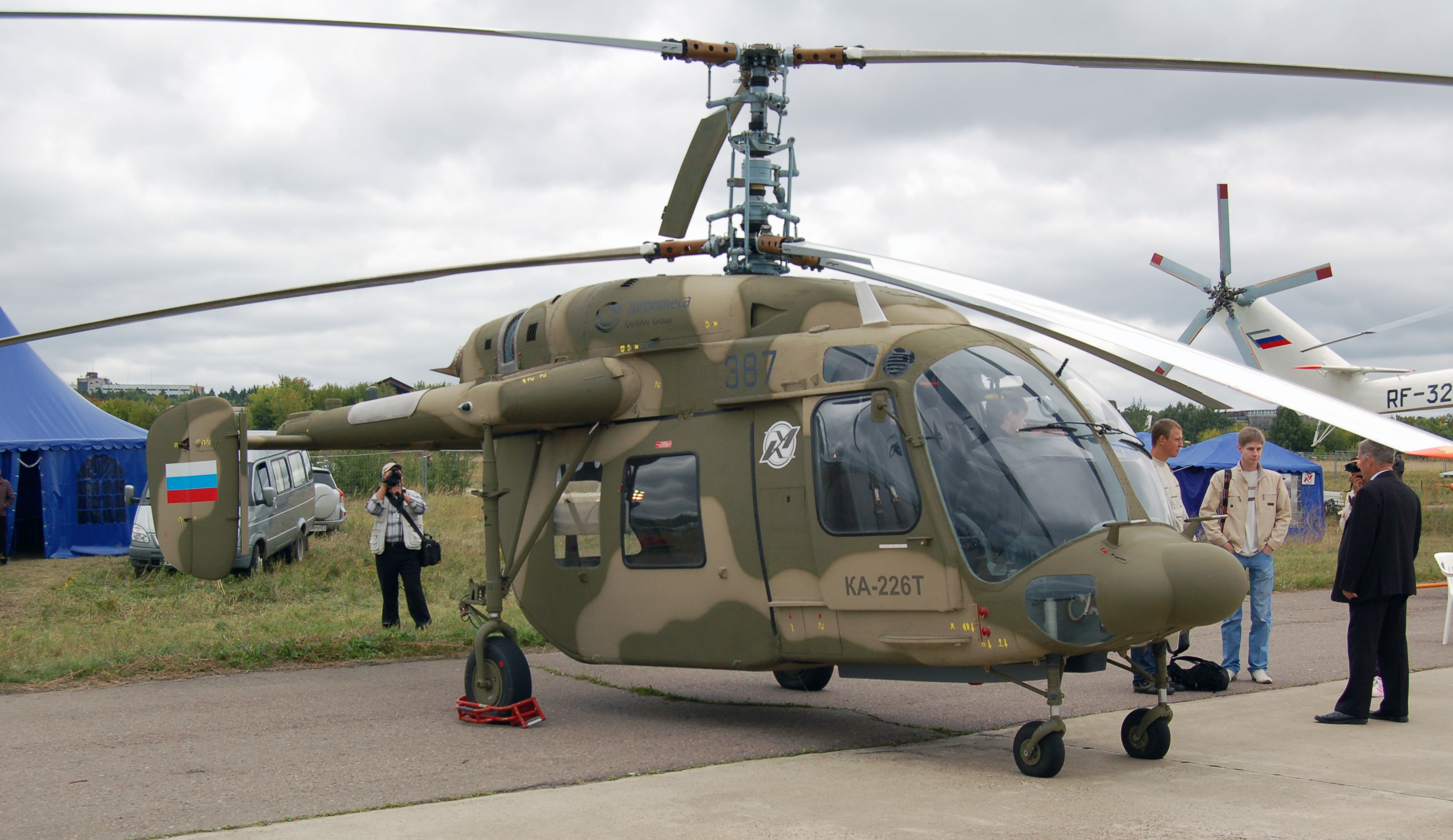
A Kamov Ka-226T at MAKS 2009

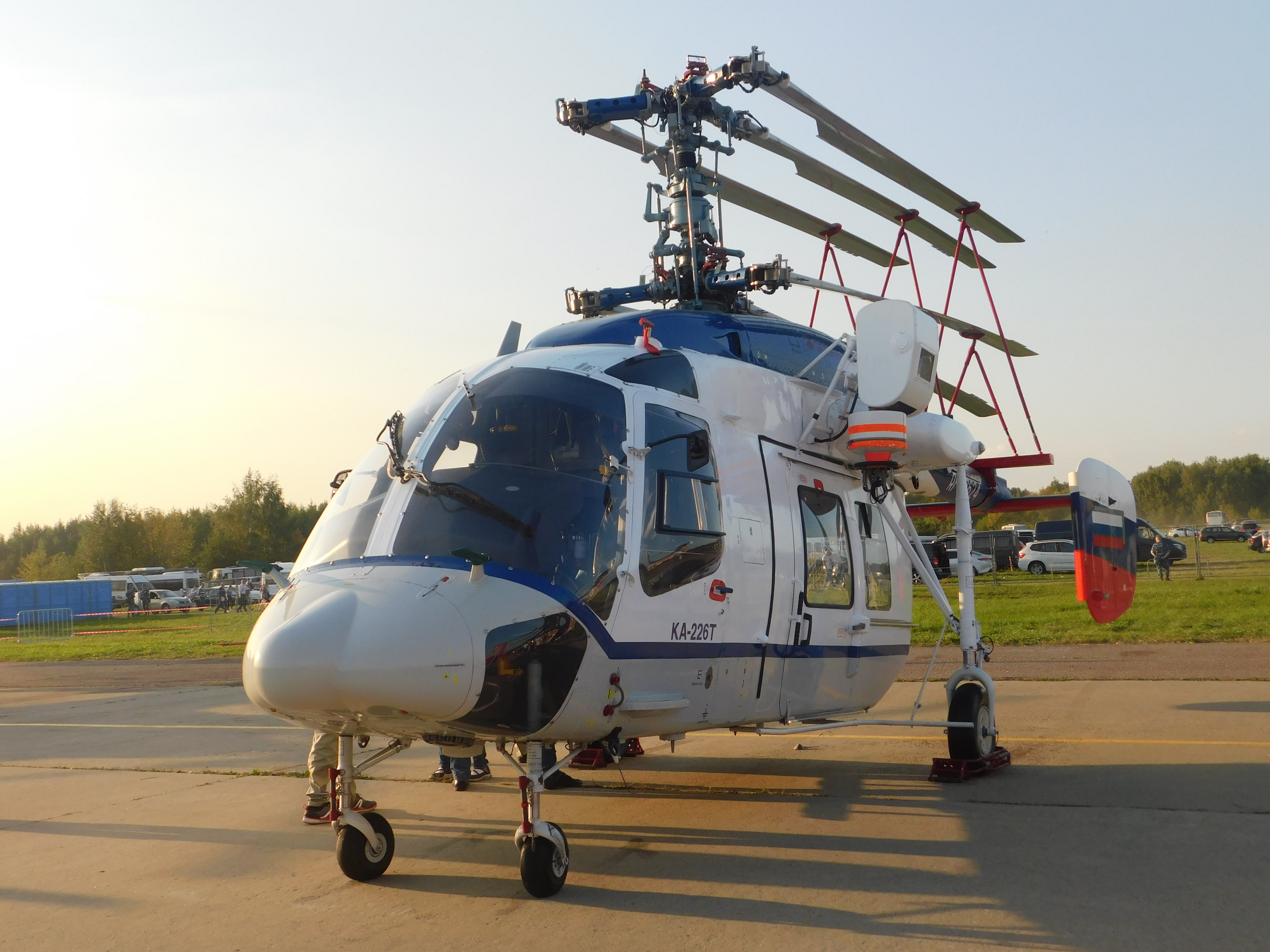
A Kamov Ka-226T with folding rotor blades at MAKS 2019

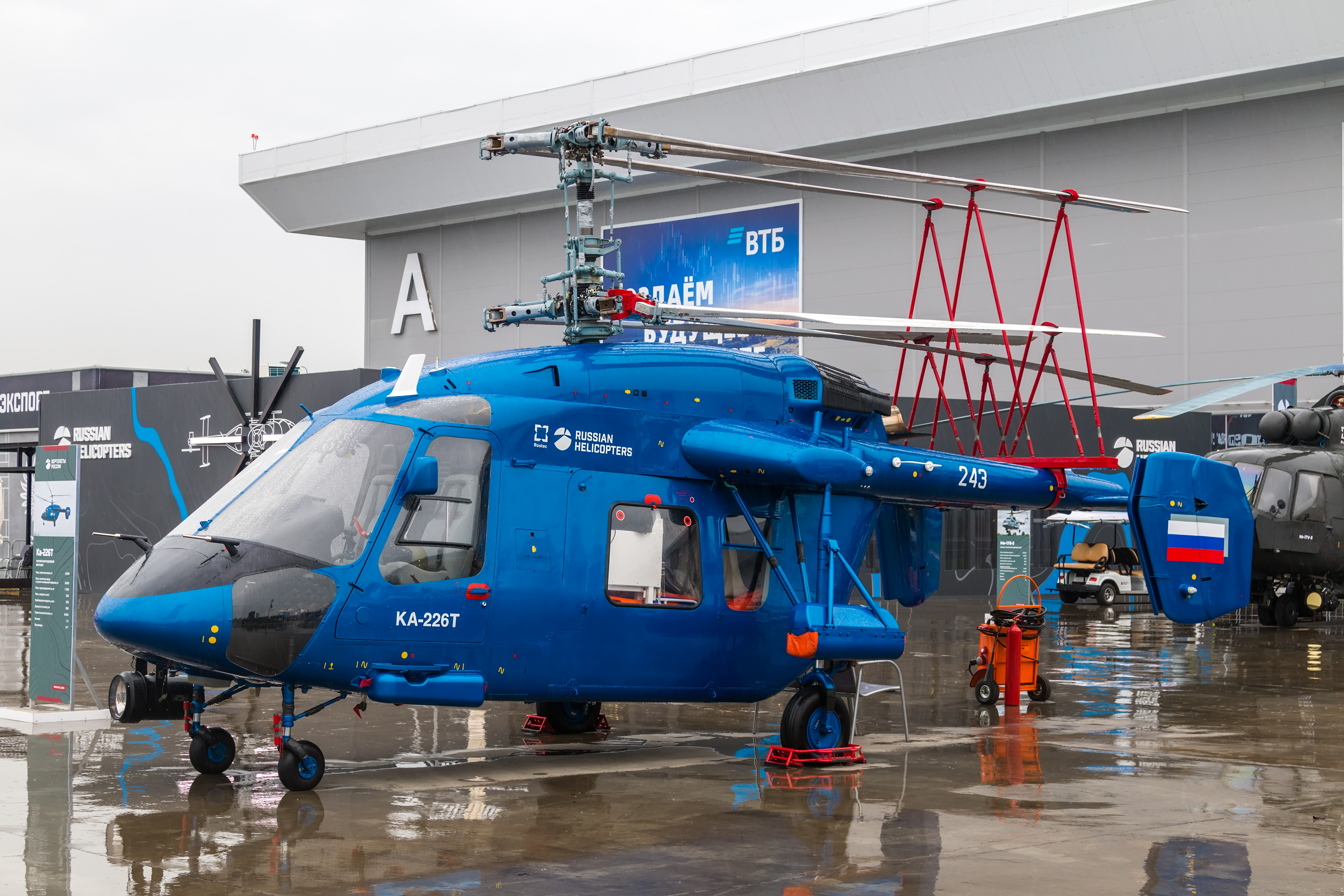
A Kamov Ka-226T with folding rotor blades and a new fuselage design at Army 2022

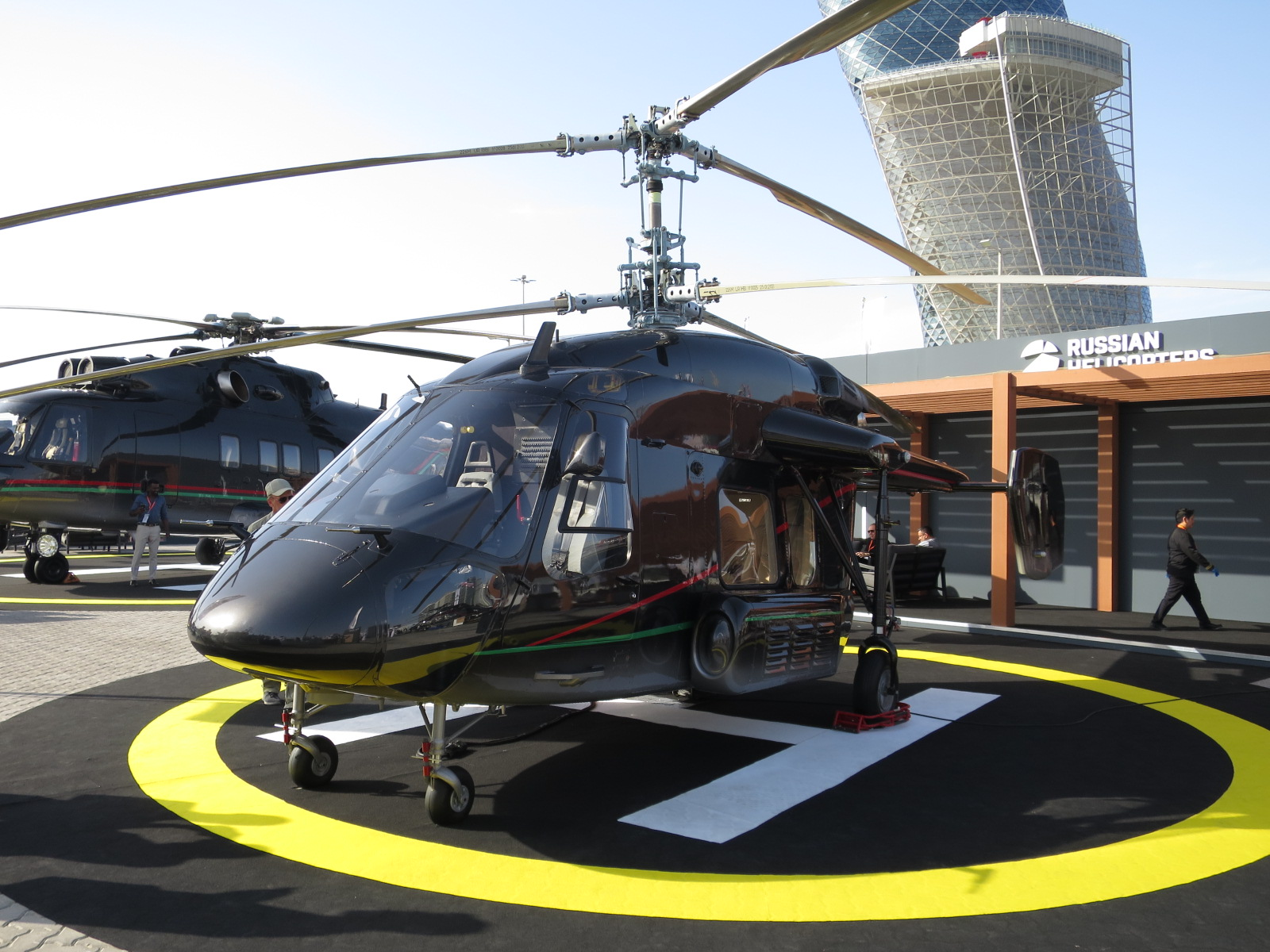
A Kamov Ka-226 with a new fuselage design at IDEX 2023

== Operators ==
=== Current operators ===
Russia

- Russian Aerospace Forces (36)
- Federal Security Service (6 on order)
- Police of Russia

Ukraine

- Ukrainian Naval Aviation (1) - operated by 10th Naval Aviation Brigade

=== Cancelled ===
India

- Indian Army and Indian Air Force planned to acquire 200 Ka-226T variants. But the contract was held up and eventually cancelled cancelled due to localisation issues.

Syria

- Syrian Arab Air Force had at least 2. The Syrian government of Al-Assad fell to rebels in late 2024, and the Syrian Arab Air Force was dismantled. It was re-established as Syrian Air Force, but the revolution, and the Israeli air strikes that followed it, wrecked havoc in the inventory of the Air Force. In late 2025, the World Air Forces publication by FlightGlobal, which tracks the aircraft inventories of world's air forces and publishes its counts annually, removed all Syrian Air Force's aircraft from their World Air Forces 2026 report. It is thus questionable if the Syrian Air Force has any flying aircraft in their inventory, and in particular, any Ka-226, as of December 2025.

== Specifications (Ka-226T) ==
Data from www.kamov.ru

General characteristics

- Crew: 1–2
- Capacity:
  - Passengers: 7
  - Cargo: 1,050 kg (2,310 lb) internally, or 1,100 kg (2,400 lb) on an external sling
- Length: 8.1 m (26 ft 7 in)
- Height: 4.15 m (13 ft 7 in)
- Gross weight: 3,800 kg (8,378 lb)
- Powerplant: 2 × Turbomeca Arrius 2G1 , 432.5 kW (580.0 hp) each
- Main rotor diameter: 2 × 13 m (42 ft 8 in)

Performance

- Maximum speed: 250 km/h (160 mph, 130 kn)
- Cruise speed: 220 km/h (140 mph, 120 kn)
- Range: 600 km (370 mi, 320 nmi)
- Service ceiling: 6,200 m (20,300 ft)
- Hover ceiling: 4,600 m (15,100 ft)

== See also ==
Related development

- Kamov Ka-26
- Kamov Ka-126

Aircraft of comparable role, configuration, and era

- Kaman K-MAX
- HAL Light Utility Helicopter
