= List of NATO reporting names for air-to-air missiles =

NATO reporting name for AA series air-to-air missile

== Soviet Union ==
NATO designation for Soviet / Russia missiles:

- AA-1 "Alkali" (Kaliningrad K-5)
- AA-2 "Atoll" (Vympel K-13)
- AA-3 "Anab" (Kaliningrad K-8)
- AA-4 "Awl" (Raduga K-9)
- AA-5 "Ash" (Bisnovat R-4)
- AA-6 "Acrid" (Bisnovat R-40)
- AA-7 "Apex" (Vympel R-23)
- AA-8 "Aphid" (Molniya R-60)
- AA-9 "Amos" (Vympel R-33)
- AA-10 "Alamo" (Vympel R-27)
- AA-11 "Archer" (Vympel R-73)
- AA-12 "Adder" (Vympel R-77)
- AA-13 "Axehead" (Vympel R-37)
- - none - Novator K-100 (was KS-172, R-172 etc.)

== China ==
- CH-AA-7 "Adze" (PL-12)
- CH-AA-10 "Abaddon" (PL-15)
- CH-AA-12 "Auger" (PL-17)

== See also ==
- NATO reporting name
