= List of NATO reporting names for transport aircraft =

NATO reporting name/ASCC names for transport aircraft and their Soviet, Russian and Chinese designations:

NATO reporting name	Common name
Cab	Lisunov Li-2
Camber	Ilyushin Il-86
Camel	Tupolev Tu-104
Camp	Antonov An-8
Candid	Ilyushin Il-76
Careless	Tupolev Tu-154
Cart	Tupolev Tu-70
Cash	Antonov An-28
Cat	Antonov An-10
Chan	Harbin Y-11
Charger	Tupolev Tu-144
Clam	Ilyushin Il-18 (1947)
Clank	Antonov An-30
Classic	Ilyushin Il-62
Cleat	Tupolev Tu-114
Cline	Antonov An-32
Clobber	Yakovlev Yak-42
Clod	Antonov An-14
Coach	Ilyushin Il-12
Coaler	Antonov An-72/An-74
Cock	Antonov An-22
Codling	Yakovlev Yak-40
Coke	Antonov An-24
Colt	Antonov An-2
Condor	Antonov An-124
Cooker	Tupolev Tu-110
Cookpot	Tupolev Tu-124
Coot	Ilyushin Il-18/Il-22
Cork	Yakovlev Yak-16
Cossack	Antonov An-225
Crate	Ilyushin Il-14
Creek	Yakovlev Yak-12
Crib	Yakovlev Yak-8
Crow	Yakovlev Yak-14
Crusty	Tupolev Tu-134
Cub	Antonov An-12
Cuff	Beriev Be-30/Be-32
Curl	Antonov An-26
