= Kamov Ka-118 =

Type of helicopter

General information
- Type: light multirole helicopter with NOTAR
- Manufacturer: Kamov
- Status: Design in research

The Kamov Ka-118 is a projected light multirole helicopter with the NOTAR (NO TAil Rotor) configuration based on the McDonnell Douglas design.

== Design and development ==
The first test of this concept took place on the Ka-26SS helicopter, a modified version of the Ka-26 equipped with experimental tail jet beams. The main concept of the Ka-118 features a single 4-blade main rotor, V-tail with upper tailplane, and a skid undercarriage. Pilot and copilot seated in side-by-side configuration, and four passengers in the rear cabin.

Since 1993, engine has not been selected and the NOTAR design is still in research.

== Specifications (as designed) ==
Data from Jane's All the World's Aircraft 1992–93

General characteristics

- Crew: One-
- Capacity: 4 passengers, or 1,000 kg (2,200 lb) of cargo carried externally
- Length: 10.00 m (32 ft 10 in)
- Height: 2.60 m (8 ft 6 in)
- Gross weight: 1,950 kg (4,299 lb)
- Max takeoff weight: 2,250 kg (4,960 lb) (external load)
- Fuel capacity: 700 L (150 imp gal; 180 US gal)
- Powerplant: 1 × Omsk TVO-100 turboshaft, 530 kW (710 hp)
- Main rotor diameter: 11.00 m (36 ft 1 in)
- Main rotor area: 95.03 m^{2} (1,022.9 sq ft)

Performance

- Maximum speed: 300 km/h (190 mph, 160 kn)
- Cruise speed: 270 km/h (170 mph, 150 kn)
- Range: 950 km (590 mi, 510 nmi) with normal fuel
- Service ceiling: 6,150 m (20,180 ft)
- Rate of climb: 11 m/s (2,200 ft/min)
