= Kamov V-50 =

Failed transport helicopter project

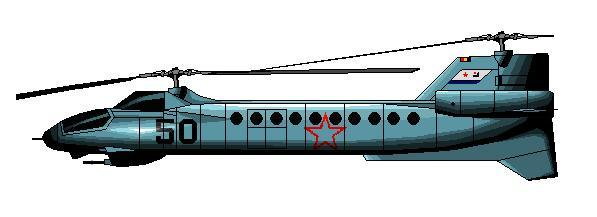
Drawing of the Kamov V-50 model

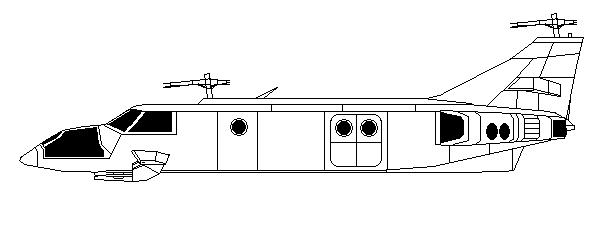
Drawing of an earlier model of the Kamov V-50

The Kamov V-50 was an armed tandem-rotor transport helicopter project from Kamov, with a projected speed of 400 km/h. The project was abandoned in the late 1969 after being started in early 1968. Due to the limited development time, little statistical information exists. Two different models exist.
