= Kamov Ka-26 =

Utility helicopter in the USSR

Ka-26
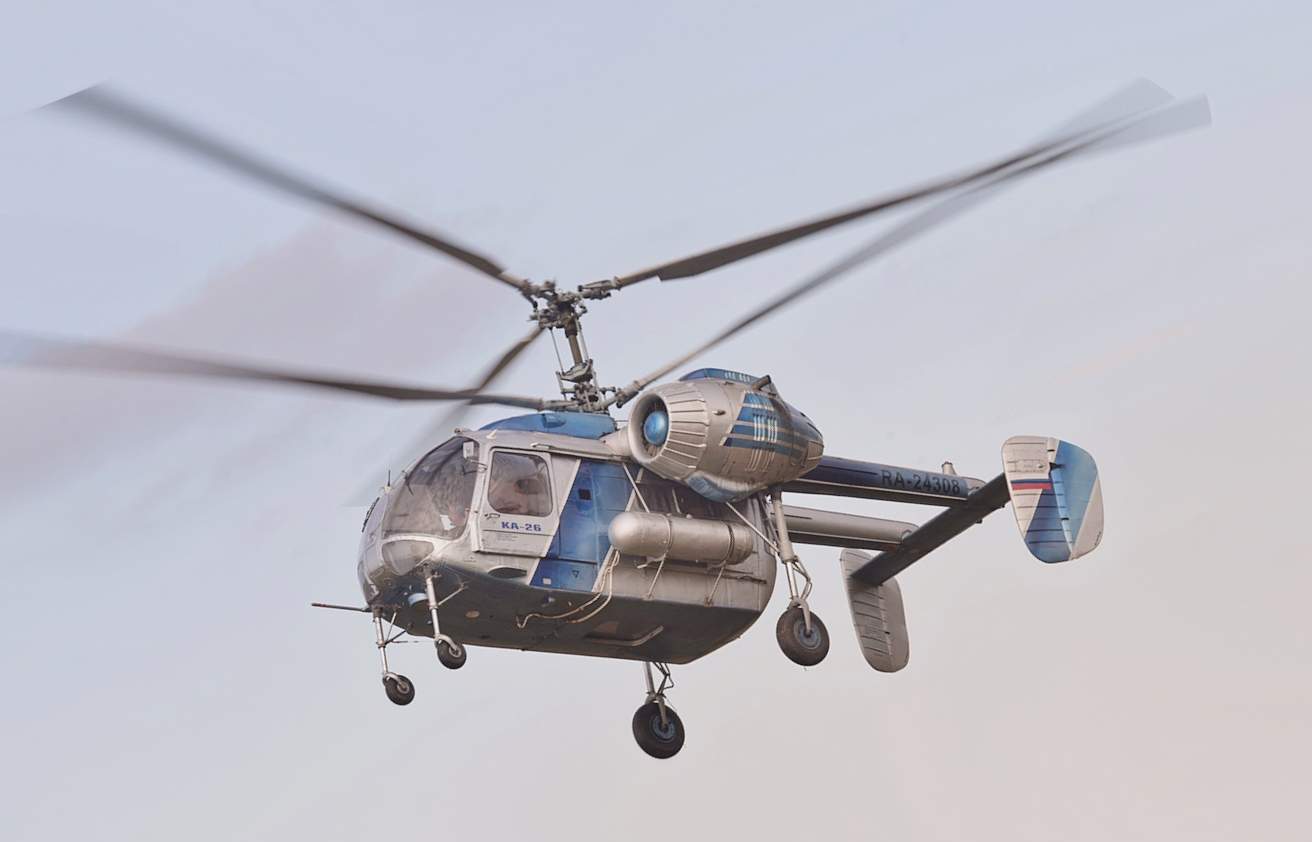
- A Kamov Ka-26 in flight

General information
- Type: Light utility
- Manufacturer: Kamov
- Status: Active; out of production
- Number built: 816

History
- Manufactured: 1968–1985
- Introduction date: 1969
- First flight: 18 August 1965
- Developed into: Kamov Ka-126; Kamov Ka-226

The Kamov Ka-26 (NATO reporting name Hoodlum) is a Soviet light utility helicopter with co-axial rotors.

== Development ==
The Ka-26 entered production in 1969 and 816 were built. A variant with a single turboshaft engine is the Ka-126. A twin-turboshaft–powered version is the Ka-226. (All the Ka-26/126/128/226 variants are code-named by NATO as "Hoodlum").

== Design ==
The fuselage of the Ka-26 consists of a fixed, bubble-shaped cockpit containing the pilot and co-pilot, plus a removable, module available in medevac, passenger-carrying and crop duster versions. The helicopter can fly with or without the box attached for flexibility.

It is powered by two 325 hp (239 kW) Vedeneyev M-14V-26 radial engines mounted in outboard nacelles.

== Operational history ==
The Ka-26 is eminently useful for civil agricultural use, especially crop dusting. The coaxial main rotor configuration, which makes the Ka-26 small and agile, also results in a delicate airflow pattern under the helicopter, providing a thorough, yet mild distribution of chemicals onto plants. The Ka-26 is often used to spray grape farms in Hungary, where conventional helicopters would damage or up-root the vine-stocks with their powerful downwash. Hungarian Kamov operators claim that coaxial rotors of the Ka-26 creates an airflow which allows well-atomized pesticides to linger longer in the air, causing more of the residue to settle underneath, rather than on top of, the leaves. This results in a more efficient distribution of pesticides, as most pests and parasites do not live on the top side of foliage. Additionally, the coaxial vortex system is symmetrical, allowing the distribution of the pesticide to be more uniform, without the side currents induced by the tail rotor, making it easier to avoid contaminating adjacent non-crop areas.

In some Warsaw Pact armies, the Ka-26 was used only in the light paratroop or airborne role, but not the civilian agricultural role. In the military role, its slow (150 km/h) cruise speed compared with the Mi-2 (220 km/h) limits effective general-purpose military use, although its shorter length (7.75 m) compared with the Mil Mi-2 (11.9 m) and smaller rotor diameter (13 m vs. 14.6 m) are advantageous for military operations in an urban area. Its operational range is also greater than the Mil-2.

== Unlicensed foreign production ==
On 30 June 2020, Moldovan police and prosecutors closed down an illegal factory producing unlicensed copies of the Ka-26. The factory had a production line with ten air frames in various stages of completion that were intended for sale to clients in former Soviet countries.

== Variants ==
Ka-26 Hoodlum-A
One- or two-crew utility light helicopter, powered by two 325-hp (239-kW) VMK (Vedeneyev) M-14V-26 radial engines. 850 built.
Ka-26SS
NOTAR technology testbed for the Ka-118 fitted with tail jet beams.
Ka-126 Hoodlum-B
One- or two-crew utility light helicopter, powered by one 720-shp (537-kW) OMKB "Mars" (Glushenkov) TVD-100 turboshaft engine. First flown in 1986, built and developed by Industria Aeronautică Română in Romania. 2 prototypes and 15 series helicopter built.
V-60
A prototype light armed escort helicopter based on the Ka-126.
Ka-128
One prototype, powered by a 722-shp (538-kW) Turbomeca Arriel 1D1 turboshaft engine.
Kamov Ka-226
Six- or seven-seat utility helicopter, powered by two 450-shp (335-kW) Rolls-Royce (Allison) 250-C20R/2 turboshaft engines.

== Operators ==
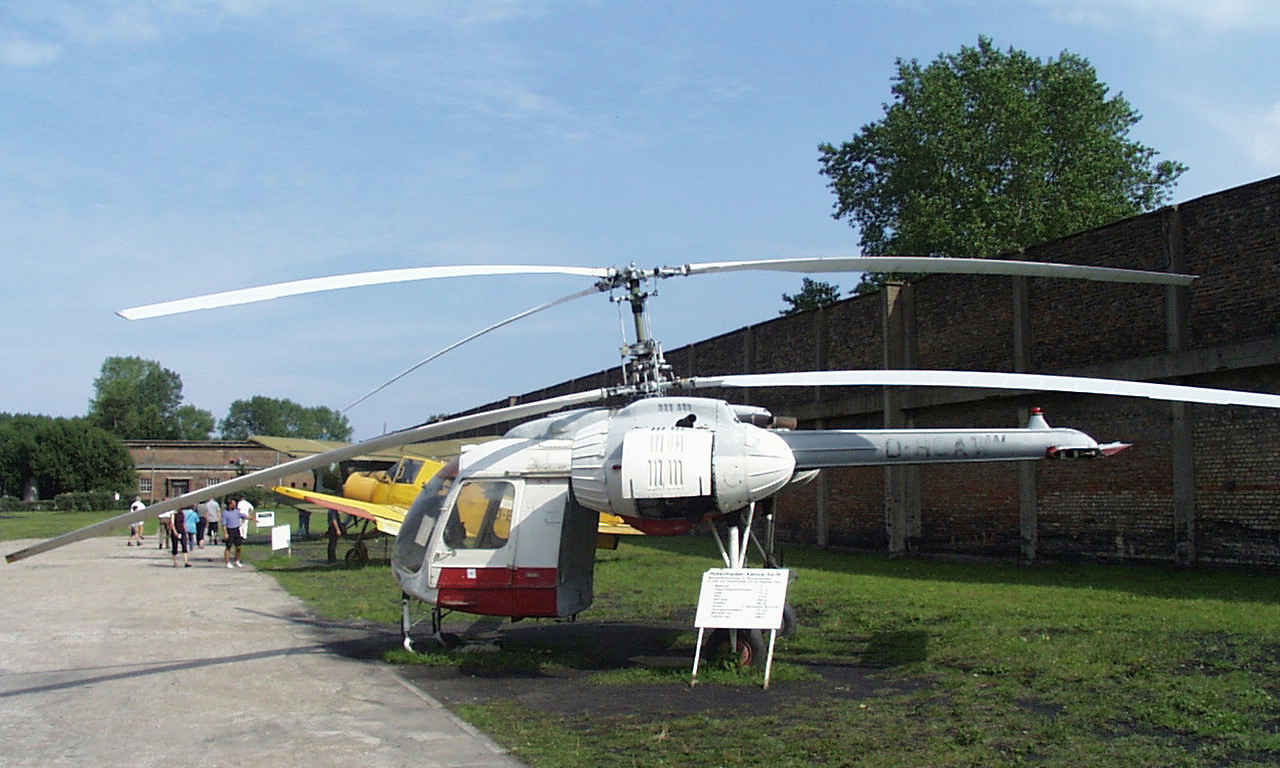
Kamov Ka-26 in aviation museum, Peenemünde, Germany

Russia

- Gazpromavia

Romania

- West Copter

Hungary

=== Former operators ===
Soviet Union

- Militsiya

Bulgaria

- Bulgarian Air Force

East Germany

- People's Police

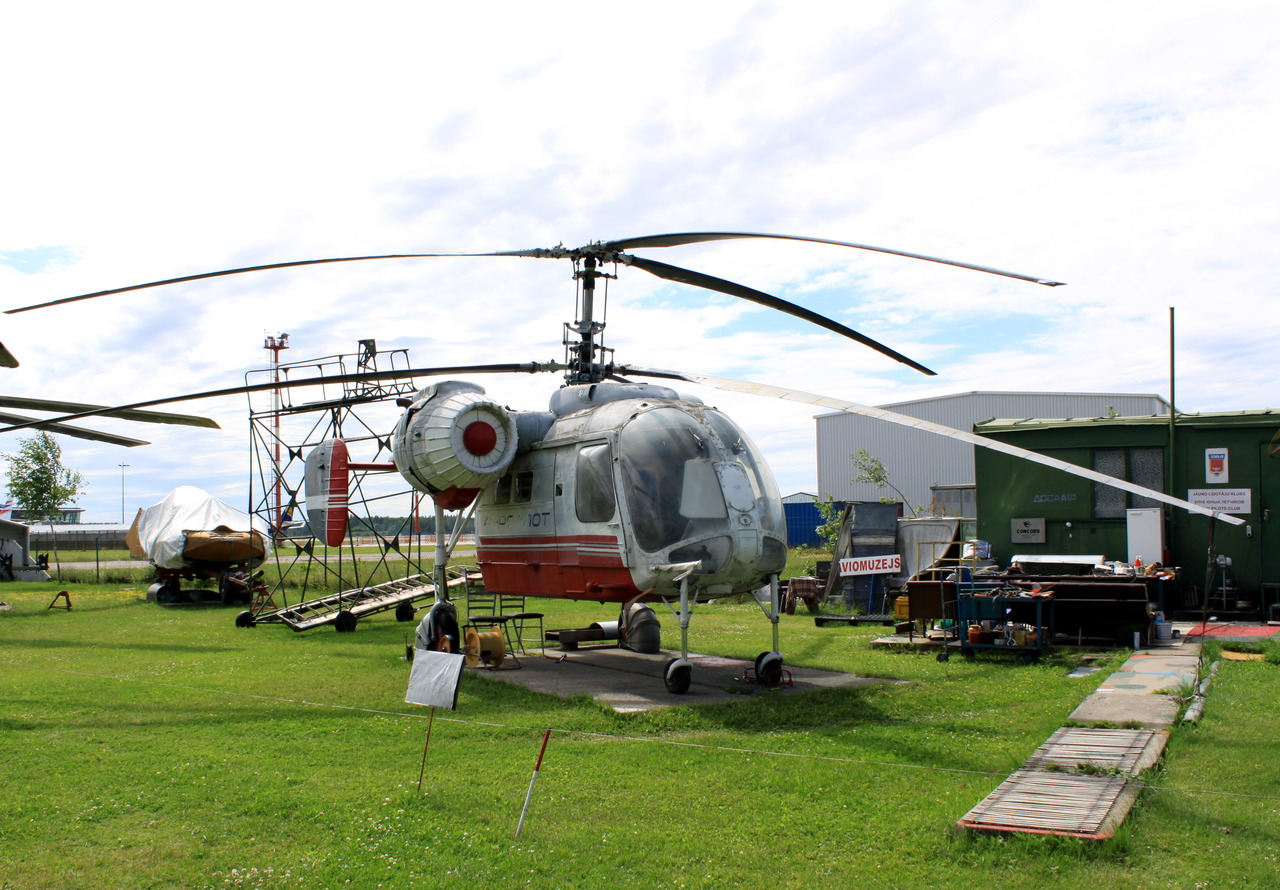
Ka-26 in aviation museum, Riga, Latvia

Mongolia

- Mongolian Air Force

Lithuania

- Lithuanian State Border Guard Service

Hungary

- Hungarian Air Force

Sri Lanka

- Sri Lanka Air Force

== Specifications (Ka-26) ==
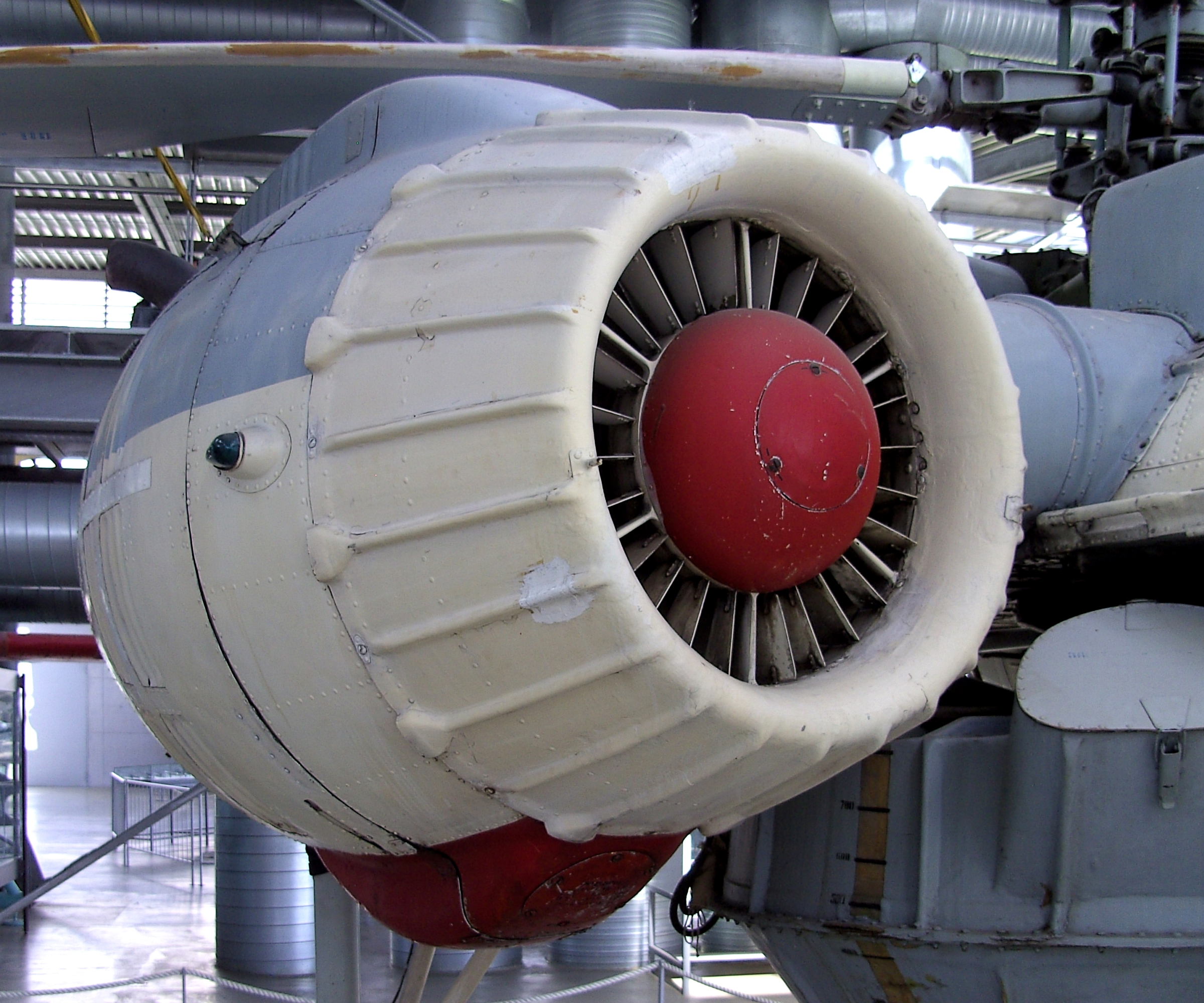
The 325-hp (239-kW) VMK (Vedeneyev) M-14V-26 radial engine of the Ka-26

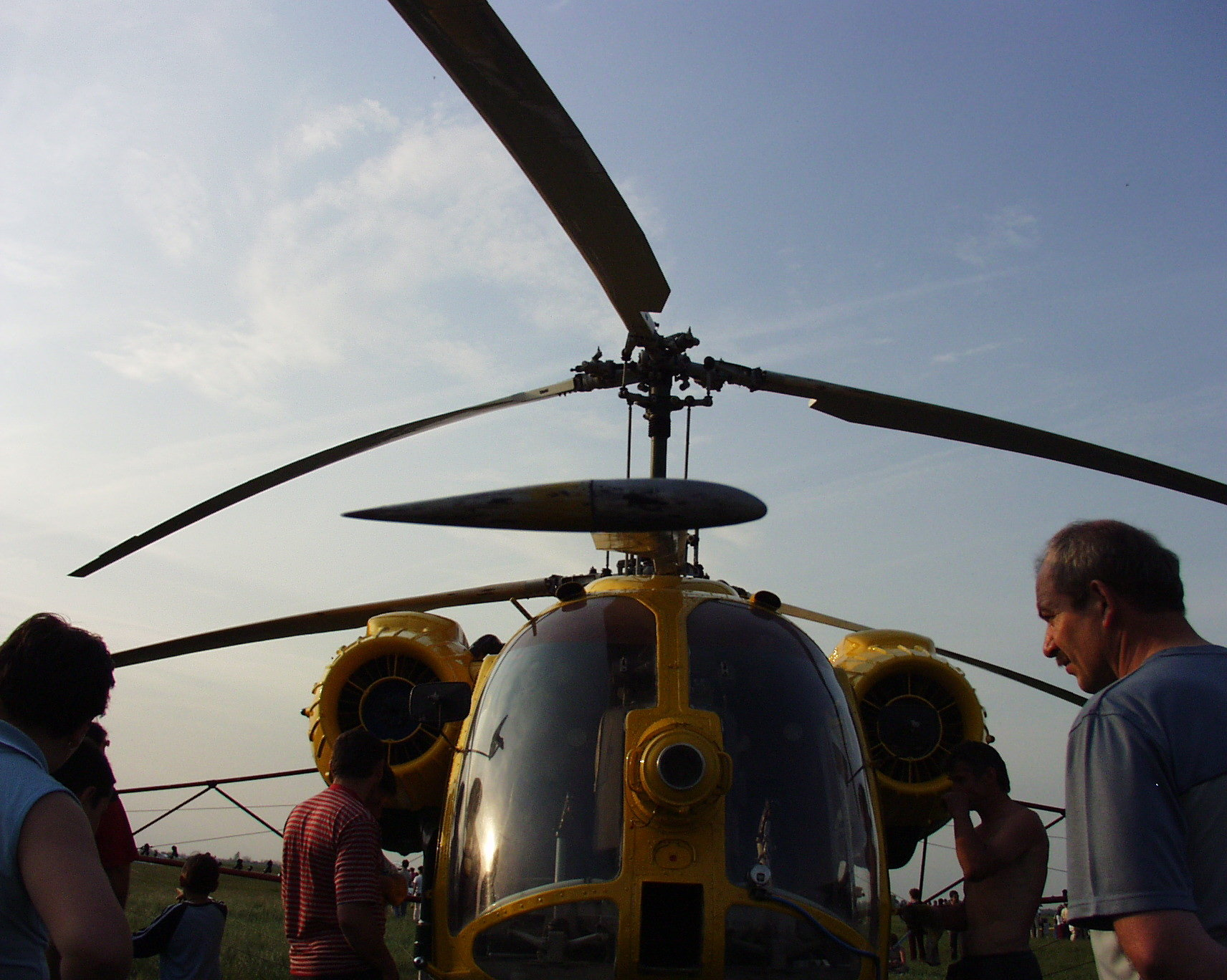
Airfoil of a Kamov Ka-26's lower rotor blade

Data from Jane's All The World's Aircraft 1982–83

General characteristics

- Crew: 1 (optionally 2)
- Capacity: 6 or 7 pax when passenger module fitted / 2 stretcher patients, 2 seated patients and medical attendant / 900 kg (1,984 lb) pax or liquid chemical / 1,065 kg (2,348 lb) dusting or with platform / 1,100 kg (2,425 lb) with slung load
- Length: 7.75 m (25 ft 5 in) fuselage
- Width: 3.64 m (11 ft 11 in) over engine pods
- Height: 4.05 m (13 ft 3 in)
- Empty weight: 1,950 kg (4,299 lb) sans passenger pod / platform / agricultural equipment
- Gross weight: 3,076 kg (6,781 lb) passenger version

2,980 kg (6,570 lb) other versions

- Max takeoff weight: 3,250 kg (7,165 lb)
- Fuel capacity: 360 kg (794 lb) with pax; 100 kg (220 lb) agricultural
- Powerplant: 2 × Vedeneyev M-14V-26 9-cylinder air-cooled radial piston engines, 242.5 kW (325.2 hp) each
- Main rotor diameter: 2 × 13 m (42 ft 8 in)

Performance

- Maximum speed: 170 km/h (110 mph, 92 kn)
- Cruise speed: 150 km/h (93 mph, 81 kn) max

90–110 km/h (56–68 mph; 49–59 kn) economical

- Agricultural operating speed: 30–115 km/h (19–71 mph; 16–62 kn)
- Range: 400 km (250 mi, 220 nmi) with 7 pax,30 minutes reserve
- Ferry range: 1,200 km (750 mi, 650 nmi) with auxiliary fuel tanks
- Endurance: 3 hours 42 minutes at 90–110 km/h (56–68 mph; 49–59 kn)
- Service ceiling: 3,000 m (9,800 ft)
- Service ceiling one engine inoperative: 500 m (1,600 ft)
- Hover ceiling IGE: 1,300 m (4,300 ft) at 3,000 kg (6,614 lb) AUW
- Hover ceiling OGE: 800 m (2,600 ft) at 3,000 kg (6,614 lb) AUW
- Disk loading: 12 kg/m^{2} (2.5 lb/sq ft)
- Power/mass: 0.150 kW/kg (0.091 hp/lb)

== See also ==
Related development

- Kamov Ka-226

Aircraft of comparable role, configuration, and era

- Kaman K-MAX
