= Kamov Ka-40 =

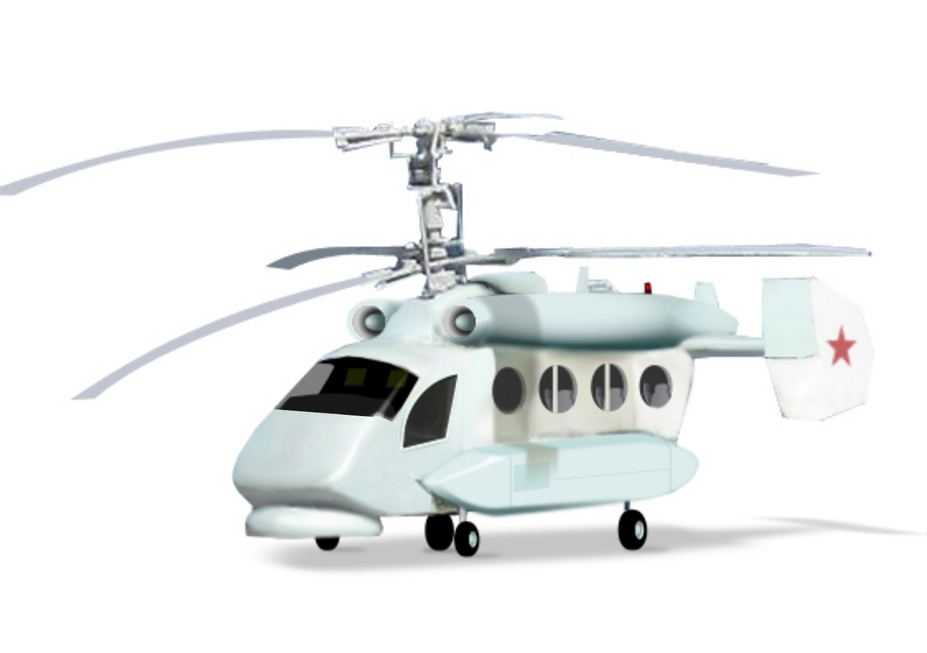
- Illustration of the Ka-40

General information
- Type: Anti-Submarine Warfare (ASW) helicopter
- Manufacturer: Kamov
- Status: Suspended

The Kamov Ka-40 is reported to be a new anti-submarine helicopter based on the Ka-27 and has been under development since 1990.

== Design and development ==
The design was based on and fit to replace the Ka-27 with a pointed streamlined nose. Reportedly powered by two 1,838 kW (2,465 shp) Klimov TVA-3000 turboshaft engines, driving a coaxial rotor system. The civil variant could carry a 7,000 kg (15,432 lb) underslung load, while the military naval variant can include an array of ASW weapons and electronics. Armament is expected to include APR-3 water-jet-propelled torpedoes and KAB-250PL guided depth charges.

Although the Ka-40 was proposed for several civil and military roles, development was suspended in 1998.

== Specifications ==
(projected specs)

- Capacity: 7,000 kg (15,432 lb) payload
- Engine: 2 x 1,838 kW (2,465shp) Klimov TVA-3000 turboshafts
- Normal Take-off weight: 12,500 kg (27,557 lb)
- Max. take-off weight: 14,500 kg (31,967 lb)
