= Kamov Ka-37 =

Type of helicopter

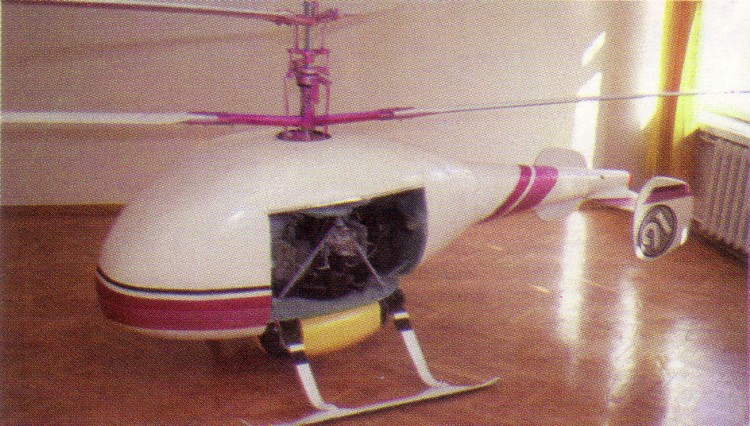

General information
- Type: Unmanned Aerial Vehicle (UAV)
- Manufacturer: Kamov

History
- First flight: 1993

The Kamov Ka-37 is an unmanned helicopter designed for aerial photography, television and radio broadcasting, delivery of medicines, food, mail, and emergency aid in disasters or hard and dangerous environments, and later several military roles. The aircraft uses coaxial rotors and a 45 kW engine. The operator may be located in a vehicle with monitors and flight controls, or with a simple hand-held radio controller.

== Specifications ==
- Engine power: 45 kW, (60 hp)
- Max. take-off weight: 250 kg, (551 lb)
- Economic cruising speed: 110 km/h, (68 mph)
- Hover ceiling: 2,500m, (1,553 ft)
- Range: 530 km, (329 mi)
- Endurance: 45min
- Payload: 50 kg, (110 lb)
