= Kamov Ka-126 =

Soviet light utility helicopter

Ka-126

General information
- Type: Light utility helicopter
- Manufacturer: Industria Aeronautică Română
- Designer: Kamov
- Status: Active
- Number built: 17

History
- Manufactured: 1988–1991
- Introduction date: 1989
- First flight: 22 December 1988
- Developed from: Kamov Ka-26
- Developed into: Kamov Ka-226

The Kamov Ka-126 (NATO reporting name Hoodlum) is a Soviet light utility helicopter with co-axial rotors. Evolved from Ka-26 with engine pods removed from stub wings, fitted with one TVO-100 turboshaft engine positioned on top of fuselage, modified rotor blades, new fuel system.

== Development ==
Development began in 1984 with the signing of governmental Romanian-Soviet agreement in the field of aeronautical construction for cooperation in manufacturing a utility helicopter derived from Kamov Ka-26 helicopter. In October 1985 the signing of the collaboration protocol for the manufacturing of the single engine turbine powered KA 126 helicopter. In 1986 Industria Aeronautică Română (IAR) started the helicopter manufacturing preparation. Early mockups had two small turboshafts above cabin; single turboshaft adopted subsequently; ground test vehicle completed early 1986; On 22 December 1988 was maiden flight of the IAR Built Ka 126 with TV100 engine produced by Turbomecanica București and VR126 main gear built by I. Avioane Bacău today Aerostar. After building 17 Ka 126 production was stopped and after 1991 the program was cancelled.

A twin engine variant was developed as the Ka-226.

== Design ==
The fuselage of the Ka-126 consists of a fixed, bubble-shaped cockpit containing the pilot and co-pilot, plus a removable, variable box available in medevac, passenger-carrying and cropduster versions. The helicopter can fly with or without the box attached, giving it much flexibility in use.

== Variants ==
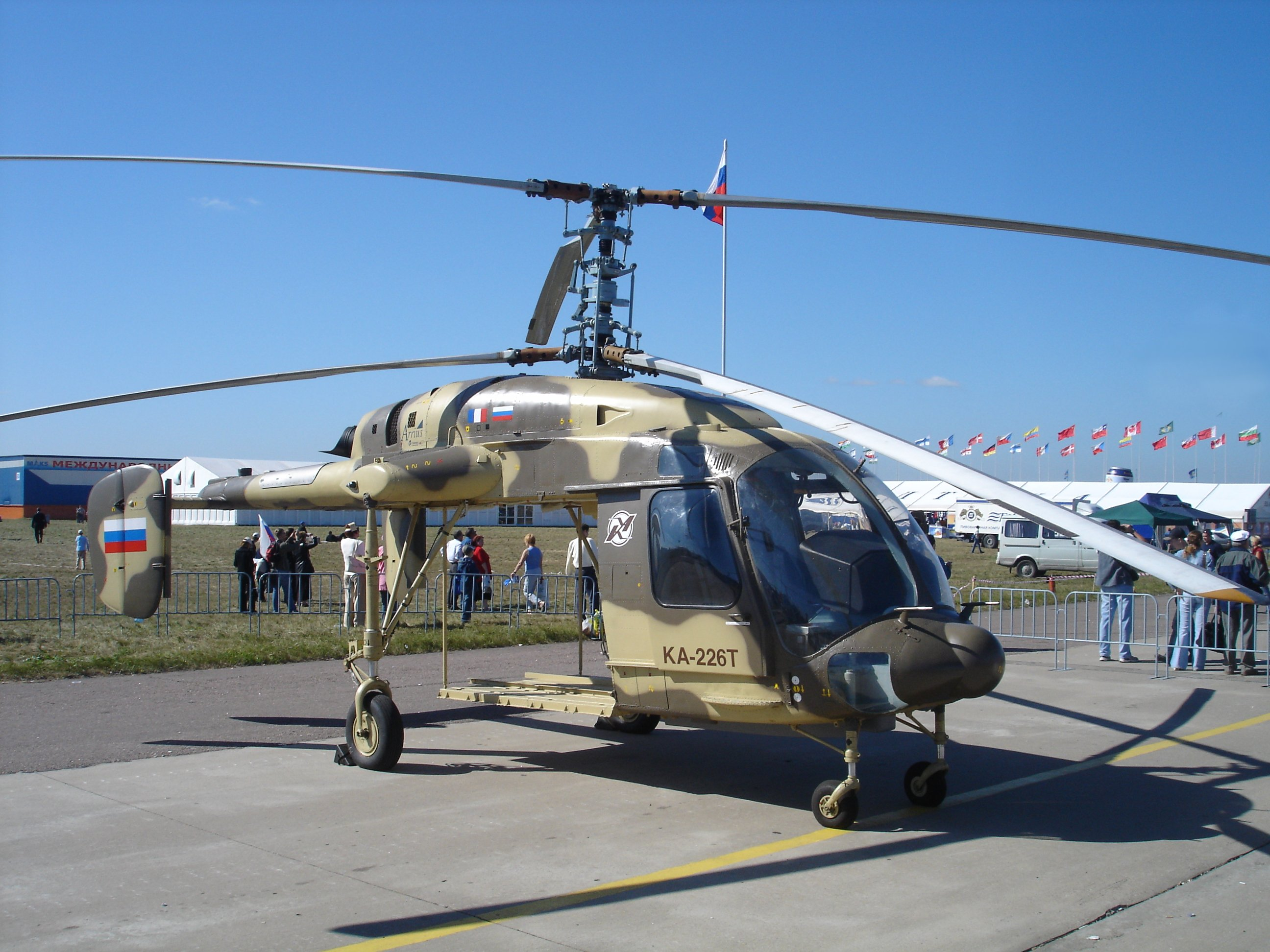
Kamov Ka-226

Ka-126 Hoodlum-B
One or two crew utility light helicopter, powered by a 720-shp (537-kW) (Glushenkov) OMKB TVD-100 turboshaft engines. First flown in 1986, and built under licence by IAR in Romania. 2 prototypes and 15 series helicopter built.
Ka-128
One prototype, powered by a 722-shp (538-kW) Turbomeca Arriel 1D1 turboshaft engine.
Kamov Ka-226
Powered by two 450-shp (335-kW) Rolls-Royce 250-C20R/2 turboshaft engines.

=== Kamov V-60 ===
The V-60 was a projected light (3500 kg) armed escort helicopter from Kamov based on the civil Kamov Ka-126. Only a model of the original V-60 exists. The existing model shows four missiles as its sole armament. The project was abandoned in the 1980s and is often confused to be an early concept of the Ka-60. The initial prototype and pre-series version of the Ka-60 carried another designation, V-62.

== Specifications (Ka-126) ==
Data from Jane's All The World's Aircraft 1993–94

General characteristics

- Crew: 2
- Capacity: 6 passengers (cargo/passenger pod) / 1,000 kg (2,205 lb) slung load / 1,000 L (260 US gal; 220 imp gal) chemical hopper
- Length: 7.775 m (25 ft 6 in)
- Height: 4.155 m (13 ft 8 in)
- Empty weight: 1,915 kg (4,222 lb)
- Max takeoff weight: 3,250 kg (7,165 lb)
- Powerplant: 1 × Omsk TVO-100 turboshaft, 522 kW (700 hp)
- Main rotor diameter: 2 × 13 m (42 ft 8 in)
- Main rotor area: 265.5 m^{2} (2,858 sq ft)
- Blade sections: NACA 23015 modified root, NACA 23012 modified tip

Performance

- Maximum speed: 180 km/h (110 mph, 97 kn)
- Cruise speed: 160 km/h (99 mph, 86 kn)
- Range: 713 km (443 mi, 385 nmi)
- Service ceiling: 3,850 m (12,630 ft)
- Rate of climb: 6.6 m/s (1,300 ft/min)

== See also ==
Related development

- Kamov Ka-26
- Kamov Ka-226

Aircraft of comparable role, configuration, and era

- Kaman K-MAX
