= Kamov Ka-115 =

Ka-115 Moskvichka

General information
- Type: light multi-purpose helicopter
- Manufacturer: Kamov
- Status: project

History
- First flight: 1999

The Kamov Ka-115 Moskvichka is a light multi-purpose helicopter designed for many uses, including passenger and cargo transportation, emergency service, SAR and patrol, or charter flights.

== Design and development ==
Development is based on extensive use of advanced technologies tested to ensure high performance and reduce operating costs. A full-scale mockup of the helicopter was first built to optimize the layout of technological, operational, and ergonomic features. A wind tunnel model TsAGI was created to test flight characteristics and improve aerodynamic airframe layout. Laboratories tested the air intakes' dust device to improve efficiency. A model of the Ka-115 was presented at the aerospace show MAKS-95 in Zhukovsky. Prototype's first flight was 1999 and the aircraft is in production.

The basic Ka-115 is powered by a Pratt & Whitney Canada/Klimov PW206K/2 engine that drives a coaxial rotor system, equipped with rotor de-icing. The Ka-115 features a large five-door cabin with large windows and a skid undercarriage. The cabin is fitted with vibration and noise suppression, heating and ventilation systems, and comfortable shock-absorbing crew and passenger seats.

== Specifications ==
General characteristics

- Crew: 1
- Capacity: 4 passengers or 900 kg (1,984 lb) maximum payload
- Length: 9.2 m (30 ft 2 in)
- Width: 2.0 m (6 ft 7 in)
- Height: 3.6 m (11 ft 10 in)
- Max takeoff weight: 1,850 kg (4,079 lb)
- Powerplant: 1 × Pratt & Whitney/Klimov PW 206K/2 turboshaft engine, 477 kW (640 hp)
- Main rotor diameter: 9.5 m (31 ft 2 in)
- Main rotor area: 70.88 m^{2} (762.9 sq ft)

Performance

- Maximum speed: 250 km/h (160 mph, 130 kn)
- Cruise speed: 230 km/h (140 mph, 120 kn)
- Range: 780 km (480 mi, 420 nmi)
- Service ceiling: 5,200 m (17,100 ft)
- Rate of climb: 11.5 m/s (2,260 ft/min)
