= Kamov Ka-10 =

1949 scout helicopter series by Kamov

Ka-10
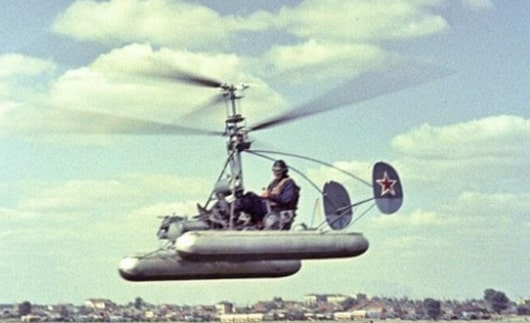
- Ka-10M in flight

General information
- Type: Observation helicopter
- National origin: Soviet Union
- Manufacturer: Kamov
- Designer: Nikolay Kamov
- Status: Retired
- Primary user: Soviet Navy
- Number built: 16

History
- First flight: September 1949
- Developed from: Kamov Ka-8
- Developed into: Kamov Ka-15

The Kamov Ka-10 (NATO reporting name Hat or Hattie) was a Soviet single-seat observation helicopter that first flew in 1949.

== Design and development ==
The Ka-10 was a development of Nikolay Kamov's earlier Ka-8, which had been successful enough to allow Kamov to set up his own OKB (design bureau) in 1948. The Ka-10 was of similar layout to the Ka-8, with an open steel-tube structure carrying an engine, a pilot's seat and two three-bladed coaxial rotors. It was larger, however, with a revised transmission and rotor hub design, and a new engine specially designed for the helicopter, the 41 kilowatts (55 hp) Ivchenko AI-4 flat-four.

== Operational history ==
The Ka-10 made its maiden flight in September 1949. Three more prototypes followed, which were evaluated by Soviet Naval Aviation. A Ka-10 was displayed at the 1950 Tushino Air Display, and one made the first landing by a Soviet helicopter on the deck of a ship on 7 December 1950.

In 1954, 12 of an improved version, the Ka-10M were built for the Maritime Border Troops. They had a twin tail rather than the single vertical fin of the Ka-10 and modified rotors and control systems.

== Variants ==
Ka-10
Single-seat observation helicopter.
Ka-10M
Improved version fitted with twin tailfins and rudders.

== Operators ==
Soviet Union

- Soviet Navy

== Specifications ==
Data from The Osprey Encyclopedia of Russian Aircraft 1875–1995

General characteristics

- Crew: one
- Length: 3.70 m (12 ft 1.75 in) (fuselage length)
- Height: 2.5 m (8 ft 2.5 in)
- Empty weight: 234 kg (516 lb)
- Gross weight: 375 kg (827 lb)
- Powerplant: 1 × Ivchenko AI-4V , 41 kW (55 hp)
- Main rotor diameter: 2 × 6.12 m (20 ft 1 in)
- Main rotor area: 58.8 m^{2} (633 sq ft)

Performance

- Maximum speed: 90 km/h (56 mph, 49 kn)
- Range: 95 km (59 mi, 51 nmi)
- Service ceiling: 1,000 m (3,300 ft)
