= Kamov Ka-18 =

1955 Soviet utility helicopter developed by Kamov

Ka-18
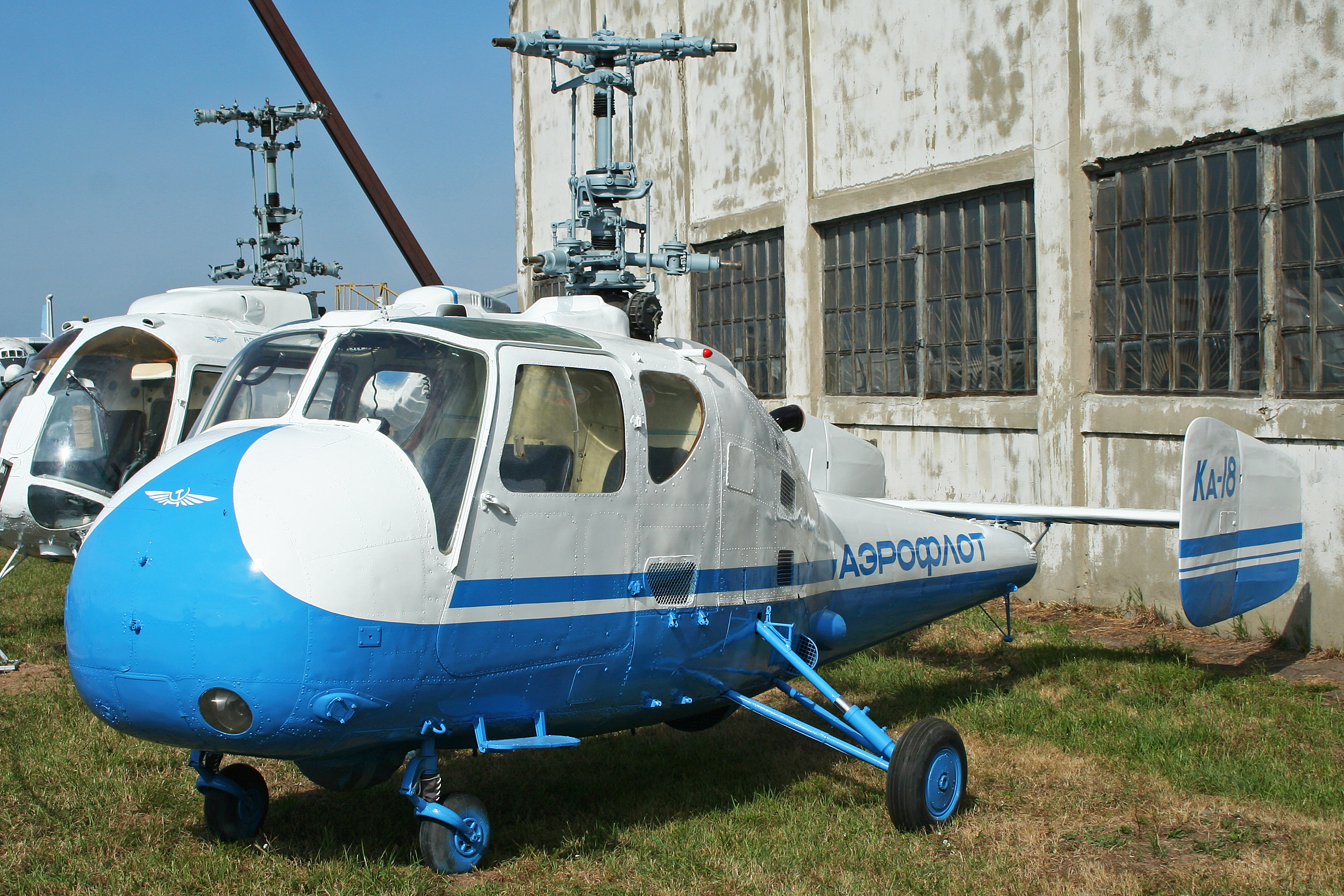

General information
- Type: Light utility helicopter
- National origin: Soviet Union
- Manufacturer: Kamov
- Number built: ~120

History
- Introduction date: 1957
- First flight: 1955
- Retired: 1973
- Developed from: Kamov Ka-15

The Kamov Ka-18 (NATO reporting name Hog) was a Soviet four-seat utility helicopter that first flew in 1955. It was a development of the Kamov Ka-15, with a lengthened fuselage and a more powerful engine - the 190 kW (255 hp) Ivchenko AI-14V radial. Total production from Kamov was about 120.

== Operators ==
Soviet Union

- Soviet Naval Aviation

== Specifications (Ka-18) ==
Data from Soviet Transport Aircraft since 1945

General characteristics

- Crew: One
- Capacity: 3 passengers
- Length: 7.03 m (23 ft 1 in)
- Height: 3.34 m (10 ft 11 in)
- Empty weight: 1,060 kg (2,337 lb)
- Max takeoff weight: 1,480 kg (3,263 lb)
- Powerplant: 1 × Ivchenko AI-14VF 9-cylinder air-cooled radial engine, 209 kW (280 hp)
- Main rotor diameter: 2 × 9.96 m (32 ft 8 in)

Performance

- Maximum speed: 150 km/h (93 mph, 81 kn)
- Cruise speed: 120 km/h (75 mph, 65 kn) at 490 m (1,610 ft)
- Range: 165 km (103 mi, 89 nmi)
- Service ceiling: 3,250 m (10,660 ft)

== See also ==
Related development

- Kamov Ka-15

Aircraft of comparable role, configuration, and era

- Bell 47B

Related lists

- List of military aircraft of the Soviet Union and the CIS
- List of rotorcraft
