= Kamov Ka-8 =

1947 experimental Soviet helicopter

Ka-8
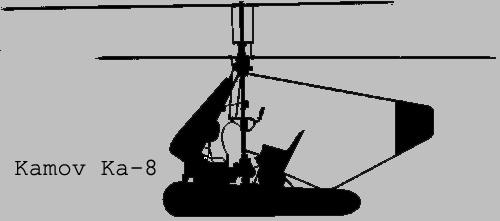

General information
- Type: Helicopter
- National origin: USSR
- Manufacturer: Kamov
- Number built: 5

History
- First flight: 1947
- Developed from: KA-17
- Developed into: Kamov Ka-10

The Kamov Ka-8 "Иркутянин", (Irkutyanin - from Irkutsk), was a small, single-seat Soviet helicopter that first flew in 1947. It was a precursor of the Ka-10. The Ka-8 was powered by a 27 hp M-76 engine, boosted to 45 hp by using alcohol for fuel. It was derived from a previous Kamov design, the KA-17.

== Description ==
Like the KA-17 design, the KA-8 featured twin coaxial, contra-rotating rotors, which meant that a tail rotor wasn't needed. While Kamov was famous at the time for his autogyros, the Soviet government was more interested in helicopters so he designed the KA-8 as a flying motorcycle (vozdushnii mototsikl). The NACA-230 blades were laminate wood covered by fabric and attached to a metal hub. The drag and flap hinges were driven by superimposed swash plates that the pilot directly controlled. The engine and fuel tank were located at the front, a tail fin (later changed to a rudder) was installed at the rear, and pontoons were used for landing. The frame was made from welded steel tubing. The original handlebar controls were replaced with vertical collective and cyclic levers and the pontoons were narrowed after being flown and evaluated by Mikhail Gurov in 1947.

== Specifications ==
Data from The Illustrated Encyclopedia of Helicopters & Stingray's List of Rotor Aircraft

General characteristics

- Crew: one
- Length: 3.7 m (12 ft 2 in)
- Width: 2.5 m (8 ft 2 in)
- Height: 2.5 m (8 ft 2 in)
- Empty weight: 183 kg (403 lb)
- Gross weight: 275 kg (606 lb)
- Powerplant: 1 × M-75 2-cyl. horizontally opposed air-cooled piston engine, 20 kW (27 hp) (license-built BMW motorcycle engine)
- Main rotor diameter: 2 × 5.6 m (18 ft 4 in)

Performance

- Maximum speed: 80 km/h (50 mph, 43 kn)
- Service ceiling: 250 m (820 ft)
