= NATO reporting name =

NATO code names for foreign military equipment

NATO uses a system of code names, called reporting names, to denote military aircraft and other equipment used by post-Soviet states, former Warsaw Pact countries, China, and other countries. The system assists military communications by providing short, one- or two-syllable names, as alternatives to the precise proper names, which may be easily confused under operational conditions or are unknown in the Western world.

The assignment of reporting names is managed by the Five Eyes Air Force Interoperability Council (AFIC), previously known as the Air Standardization Coordinating Committee (ASCC), which is separate from NATO. Based in Washington DC, AFIC comprises representatives from the militaries of three NATO members (Canada, the United Kingdom and United States) and two non-NATO countries (Australia and New Zealand).

When the system was introduced in the 1950s, reporting names also implicitly designated potentially hostile aircraft. However, since the end of the Cold War, some NATO air forces have operated various aircraft types with reporting names (e.g., "Fulcrum" for the Mikoyan MiG-29).

== US Department of Defense variations ==
The United States Department of Defense (DoD) expands on the NATO reporting names in some cases. NATO refers to surface-to-air missile systems mounted on ships or submarines with the same names as the corresponding land-based systems, but the DoD assigns a different series of numbers with a different prefix (i.e., SA-N- versus SA-) for these systems. The names are kept the same as a convenience. Where there is no corresponding system, a new name is devised.

=== Soviet space launch vehicles ===
Soviet space launch vehicle names
DoD name	Sheldon name	GRAU index	Glavkosmos name
SL-1	A	8K71PS	Sputnik
SL-2	A	8A91	Sputnik 2
SL-3	A-1	8K72, 8A92	Vostok
SL-4	A-2	11A57 11A511	Voskhod Soyuz
SL-5	A-1-m	11A510	Soyuz/Vostok
SL-6	A-2-e	8K78	Molniya
SL-6	A-2-m	8K78M	Molniya-M
SL-7	B-1	63S1, 11K63	Kosmos-2
SL-8	C-1	65S3 11K65	Kosmos-1 Kosmos-3
SL-9	D-1	8K82	Proton
SL-10	A-m	11A59	
SL-11	F-1-r	8K69, 11K69	Tsyklon-2
SL-11	F-1-m	11K67	Tsyklon-2A
SL-12	D-1-e	8K82K	Proton-4 (Proton-K/D)
SL-12	D-1-h	8K82K	
SL-13	D-1	8K82K	Proton-3 (Proton-K)
SL-14	F-2	11K68	Zenit (Tsyklon-3)
SL-15	G-1-e	11A51, 11A52	N-1
SL-16	J-1	64S2 11K64 11K77	Zenit Zenit Zenit-2
SL-17	K-1	11K25	Energia
SL-18	n/a (Note: Sheldon names are believed to have been discontinued by this point)		Start-1
SL-19	n/a	UR-100N	Strela/Rokot
SL-20	n/a		Start
SL-21 (??)	n/a		Rokot (also SL-19??)

=== Chinese space launch vehicles ===
Chinese space launch vehicle names
DoD name	China Academy of Space Technology name
CSL-1	Long March 1
CSL-2	Long March 2
CSL-3	Long March 3

=== North Korean space launch vehicles ===
North Korean space launch vehicle names
DoD name	National Aerospace Technology Administration name
KN-SL-1	Unha-3

== Soviet nicknames ==
The Soviet Union did not always assign official "popular names" to its aircraft, but unofficial nicknames were common as in any air force. Generally, Soviet pilots did not use the NATO names, preferring a native Russian nickname.

== Nomenclature ==
To reduce the risk of confusion, allocated names consist of uncommon or made-up words, the idea being that the names chosen are unlikely to occur in normal conversation and are easier to memorise.

For fixed-wing aircraft, the number of syllables indicates the type of the aircraft's engine. Single-syllable code names denote reciprocating engine or turboprop, while two-syllable code names denote jet engine.

Bombers have names starting with the letter "B", and names like "Badger" (Tupolev Tu-16), "Blackjack" (Tupolev Tu-160) and "Bear" (Tupolev Tu-95) have been used. "Frogfoot", the reporting name for the Sukhoi Su-25, references the aircraft's close air support role. Transports have names starting with "C" (for "cargo"), resulting in names like "Condor" for the Antonov An-124 or "Candid" for the Ilyushin Il-76.

== Lists of NATO reporting names ==
=== Missiles ===
The initial letter of the name indicates the use of that equipment. The alphanumeric designations (e.g., AA-2) are assigned by the U.S. DOD.

Initial letter	Description	Corresponding list
A	Air-to-air missiles, e.g., "Atoll"	List of NATO reporting names for air-to-air missiles
K	Air-to-surface missiles (from the Russian Kh designation), e.g., "Kingfish"	List of NATO reporting names for air-to-surface missiles
G	Ground-to-air missiles, e.g., "Gauntlet"	List of NATO reporting names for surface-to-air missiles
S	Surface-to-surface missiles, including ballistic missiles (e.g., "Scud") and coastal defense missiles (e.g., "Stooge")	List of NATO reporting names for surface-to-surface missiles
S	Anti-tank missiles, e.g., "Spandrel"	List of NATO reporting names for anti-tank missiles

=== Aircraft ===
The first letter indicates the type of aircraft, e.g., "Bear" for a bomber aircraft refers to the Tupolev Tu-95, or "Fulcrum" for the Mikoyan-Gurevich MiG-29 fighter aircraft. For fixed-wing aircraft, one-syllable names are used for propeller aircraft and two-syllable names for aircraft with jet engines. This distinction is not made for helicopters.

Initial letter	Description	Corresponding list
F	Fighter aircraft (e.g., Foxhound, Flanker), also later ground attack aircraft (e.g., Frogfoot)	List of NATO reporting names for fighter aircraft
B	Bomber aircraft, e.g., Bear, Blackjack	List of NATO reporting names for bomber aircraft
C	Commercial aircraft, airliners, and cargo aircraft, e.g., Condor, Crusty	List of NATO reporting names for transport aircraft
H	All kinds of helicopters, e.g., Hind, Hokum	List of NATO reporting names for helicopters
M	Miscellaneous aircraft names, including trainers (e.g., Mitten), aerial reconnaissance (e.g., Mandrake), maritime patrol (e.g., Mail), aerial refueling (e.g., Midas) and airborne early warning & control (e.g., Mainstay)	List of NATO reporting names for miscellaneous aircraft

=== Submarines ===
Before the 1980s, reporting names for submarines were taken from the NATO spelling alphabet. Modifications of existing designs were given descriptive terms, such as "Whiskey Long Bin". From the 1980s, new designs were given names derived from Russian words, such as "Akula", or "shark". These names did not correspond to the Soviet names. Coincidentally, "Akula", which was assigned to an attack submarine by NATO, was the actual Soviet name for the ballistic missile submarine NATO named "Typhoon-class". The NATO names for submarines of the People's Republic of China are taken from Chinese dynasties.

=== Equipment ===
Corresponding list List of NATO reporting names for equipment

Initial letter	Description
B	Ball End – Common navigational radar; Band Stand – Missile tracking and control; Bar Lock A – Russian P-37 "Metch" (1RL139) 2D air surveillance radar. The basic "Bar Lock" dates back to 1961; Bass Tilt – MR-123, fire control radar of the AK-630 close-in weapon system; Bell Clout – Electronic warfare jamming radar; Bell Shroud – Electronic warfare jamming radar; Bell Squat – Electronic warfare jamming radar; Big Bird C –SA-20 (S-300PMU-1/2) regiment surveillance radar 64N6, 1996; Big Bird D – SA-21 (S-400 missile system) regiment surveillance radar 91N6, 2017; Big Net – Long-range air search radar
C	Cage Bare – VHF antenna; Cage Cone – VHF antenna; Cage Pot – Electronic warfare jamming radar; Cage Stalk – VHF antenna; Clam Shell – 76N6 low-altitude surveillance radar for S-300P; Cross Bird – Gius-2 long range air search radar. A copy of British Type 291 radar; Cross Dome – MR-352 Pozitiv, a target designation radar; Cross Slot – Soviet HF Coastal
D	Don – Navigational radar; Don-Kay – Navigational radar for large ships. Replaced by Palm Frond; Down Beat – Maritime bomber I-band targeting radar for anti-ship cruise missiles; Drum Tilt – MR-104 Rys, a gun fire-control radar
E	Egg Cup – Fire control radar for guns; Eye Bowl – Missile tracking and control
F	Fan Song – fire control radar of the SA-2 system; Flat Face – target acquisition radar of the SA-3 system; Flat Jack – rotodome-mounted airborne search radar of the Tupolev Tu-126 Moss; Flat Twin – ABM radar for the uncommissioned S-225 ABM system; Fire Dome – fire control radar of the SA-11 system; Fire Can – gun direction radar used during the Vietnam War; Flap Lid – fire control radar of the SA-10A/B system; Flash Dance – BRLS-8B "Zaslon" radar found on the MiG-31; Foxfire – The TL-25 Smerch-A (also referred to as Product 720) radar featured in the MiG-25; Front Dome – MR-90 Orekh, fire control radar of SA-N-7 system
G	Grave Stone – fire control radar of the SA-21 system; Grill Pan – fire control radar of the SA-12 system
H	Hair Net – Long-range air search radar; Half Bow – Fire control radar for guns; Half Plate – MR-755 Fregat, target designation radar of SA-N-7 system; Hawk Screech – MR-105 Turel, a gun fire-control radar; Head Lights – Missile tracking and control; Head Net-A – Long-range air search radar; Head Net-B – Long-range air search radar; Head Net-C – Long-range air search radar; High Lark - RP-23 Sapfir radar on the MiG-23 fighter; High Pole A – Identification friend or foe antenna; High Pole B – Identification friend or foe antenna; High Sieve – Long-range air search radar
K	Kite Screech – MR-184, fire control radar of the AK-100 naval gun system; Knife Rest – Long-range air search radar
L	Land Roll – fire control radar of the SA-8 system; Low Blow – fire control radar of the SA-3 system
M	Moon Coast – Soviet coastal radar; Muff Cob – Fire control radar for guns
O	Owl Screech – Fire control radar for guns
P	Palm Frond – MR-212/201, a surface search radar; Pat Hand – fire control radar of the SA-4 system; Peel Group – Missile tracking and control; Plank Shave – Long-range air search radar; Plinth Net – Missile tracking and control; Pop Group – fire-control radar of SA-N-4 system; Pork Trough – mortar-projectile tracking radar; Post Lamp – Fire control radar for guns; Pot Drum – surface search radar; Pot Hand – surface search radar; Punch Bowl – Korvet-5 satellite data link used on Soviet surface ships and submarines
R	Round House – Radar array; Rum Tub – Electronic warfare jamming radar
S	Salt Pot A – Identification friend or foe antenna; Scoop Pair – Missile tracking and control; Scrum Half – fire control radar of the SA-15 system; Side Globe – Electronic warfare jamming radar; Side Net – height finder radar of the SA-3 system; Skip Spin – The Oryol ('eagle') radar set featured perhaps most memorably on the Yak-28, but also on the Su-11, and Su-15; Slim Net – Long-range air search radar; Slot Back – The N-019 pulse-Doppler target acquisition radar used on the MiG-29; Small Fred – counter-battery/surveillance radar, mounted onto a PRP-3 Val; Small Yarn – mortar-projectile tracking radar mounted in a shelter on an AT-L self-propelled, fully tracked chassis.; Snoop Pair – surface search radar for submarines; Snoop Plate – surface search radar for submarines; Snoop Slab – surface search radar for submarines; Snoop Tray – surface search radar for submarines; Soft Ball – Ramona ELINT system; Spin Scan – The RP-21 Sapfir (sapphire) radar set featured in the MiG-21; Spin Trough – Navigational radar; Square Head – Identification friend or foe antenna; Square Pair – fire control radar of the SA-5 system; Square Tie – surface search radar for small combatants and cruise missile target designation; Squat Eye – alternate target acquisition radar of the SA-3 system; Steel Yard – The Duga over-the-horizon radar; Straight Flush – fire control radar of the SA-6 system; Strut Curve – MR-302, a surface and air-search radar; Strut Pair – Long-range air search radar; Sun Visor – Fire control radar for guns
T	Tin Shield B – 5N59S/36D6, air search radar of SA-10b; Tomb Stone – fire control radar of the SA-20A/B system; Top Bow – Fire control radar for guns; Top Dome – Missile tracking radar; Top Hat A – Electronic warfare jamming radar; Top Hat B – Electronic warfare jamming radar; Top Knot – Radar array; Top Mesh – Long-range air search radar; Top Pair – Long-range air search radar; Top Plate – MR-710 Fregat, a target designation radar; Top Plate-B – MR-760 Fregat, an air search radar; Top Sail – Long-range air search radar; Top Steer – Long-range air search radar; Top Trough – Long-range air search radar; Trap Door – Missile tracking and control; Trash Can – Tamara ELINT system
V	Vee Bars – HF communication antenna; Vee Cone – HF communication antenna; Vee Tube – HF communication antenna
W	Wall Eye – Chinese JY-8 and JY-8A; Watch Dog – Electronic warfare jamming radar; Watchman (T) – Soviet, in Chinese service since 1990; Wide Mat – Chinese JY-27

== See also ==
- World War II Allied names for Japanese aircraft
