= Kamov Ka-27 =

Naval military helicopter

Ka-27
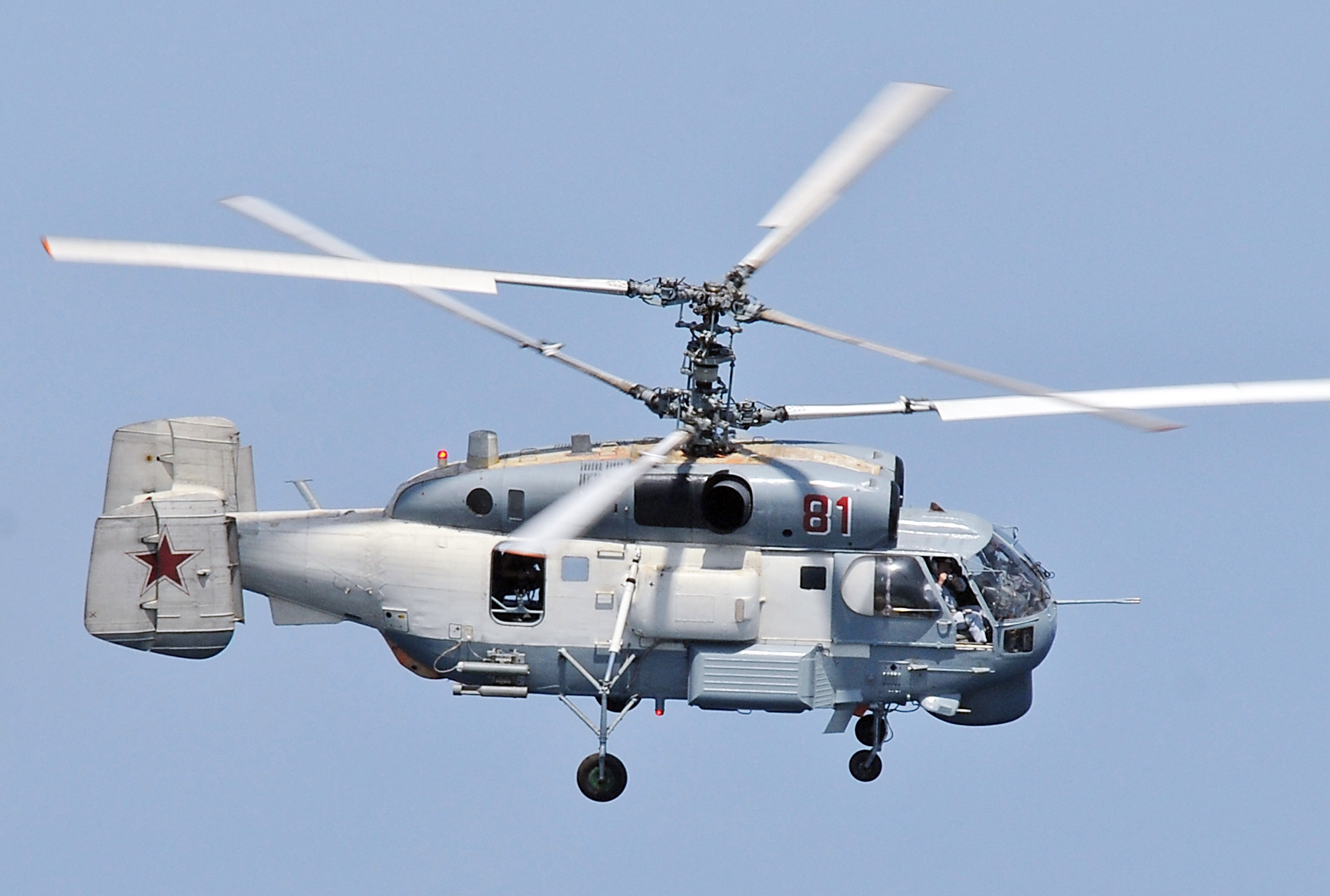
- A Russian Navy Ka-27 flying by USS Vella Gulf over the Gulf of Aden.

General information
- Type: Anti-submarine warfare helicopter (Ka-27/Ka-28); Attack helicopter with transport capabilities (Ka-29); Civilian utility helicopter (Ka-32)
- National origin: Soviet Union / Russia
- Manufacturer: Kamov
- Status: In service
- Primary users: Soviet Navy (historical) Russian Navy; Ukrainian Navy; Indian Navy

History
- Manufactured: 1979–2010
- Introduction date: 1982
- First flight: 24 December 1973
- Developed from: Kamov Ka-25
- Variant: Kamov Ka-31

The Kamov Ka-27 (NATO reporting name 'Helix') is a coaxial rotor military helicopter developed for the Soviet Navy, and as of 2024 is in service in various countries including Russia, Ukraine, Vietnam, China, South Korea, and India. Variants include the Ka-29 assault transport, the Ka-28 downgraded export version, and the Ka-32 for civilian use.

== Design and development ==
The helicopter was developed for ferrying and anti-submarine warfare. Design work began in 1969 and the first prototype flew in 1973. It was intended to replace the decade-old Kamov Ka-25, and had to have identical or smaller external dimensions than its predecessor. Like other Kamov military helicopters it has coaxial rotors, removing the need for a tail rotor. In total, five prototypes and pre-series helicopters were built. Series production started at Kumertau in July 1979, and the new helicopter officially entered service with the Soviet Navy in April 1981.

The Ka-27 has a crew of three with a pilot and navigator both stationed in the cockpit, and a sonar operator seated behind them. It has a four-leg fixed landing gear. The Ka-27 is equipped with two lateral buoys, that can be inflated in the case of a forced landing on water.

The Ka-27PL anti-submarine version is equipped with a radar, and either a dipping sonar or a magnetic anomaly detector. It can also carry either up to 36 sonobuoys, or a torpedo, or between six and eight conventional depth charges, or a single nuclear one. Ka-27PLs generally operate in pairs as hunter-killer teams.

The Ka-27PS search and rescue helicopter can carry 12 folding seats or four stretchers in its cabin, and is equipped with a 300 kg (660 lb) winch. Its fuel capacity of 3,450 litres (910 US gal; 760 imp gal) is greater than the 2,940-litre (780 US gal; 650 imp gal) capacity of the Ka-27PL.

Ka-32 variants, e.g. the Klimov-powered Ka-32A11BC, have been certified for commercial operations throughout the world, notably in Canada and Europe. The Ka-32 has been certified for the newer Klimov VK-2500PS-02 engine.

The Ka-32A11BC features a high power-to-weight ratio and ease of handling, owing to its coaxial rotor design. The rotors' diameters are not restricted by the presence of a tail rotor and associated tail boom; this facilitates maneuvering near obstacles and helps assure exceptional accuracy when hovering in heavy smoke and dust conditions. The Ka-32A11BC may be equipped with the Bambi Bucket suspended fire-fighting system of up to five tons capacity. The service life has been extended to up to 32,000 flight hours.

== Operational history ==
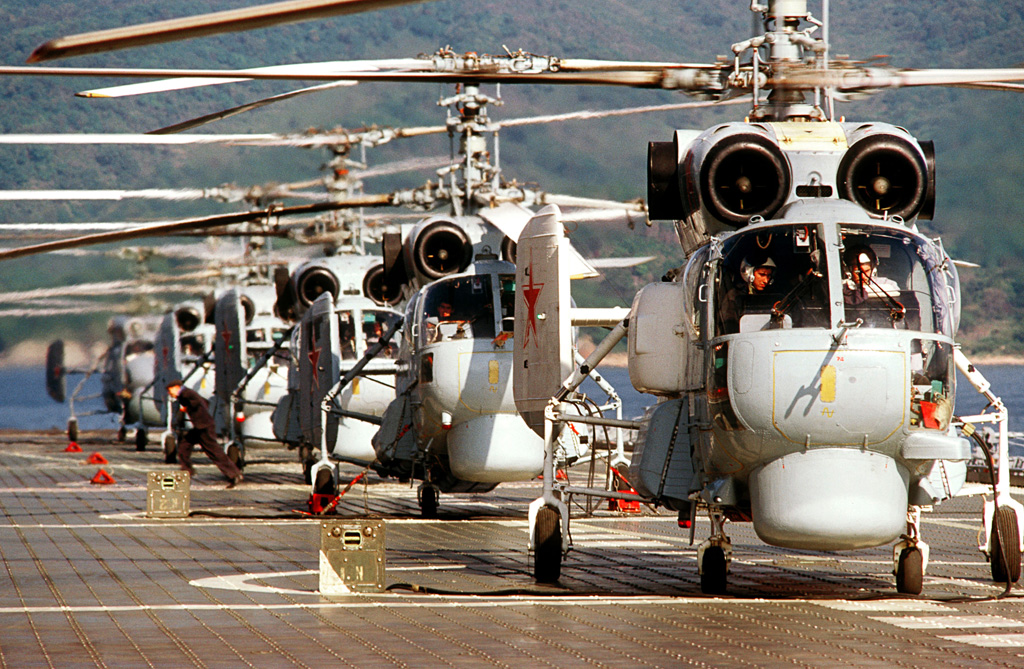
Ka-27s aboard the aircraft carrier Novorossiysk in 1984

A Russian Navy Ka-27 helicopter from the Russian Udaloy-class destroyer Severomorsk conducted interoperability deck landing training on board the US command ship USS Mount Whitney on 22 July 2010.

Ka-32A11BC multipurpose helicopters have been successfully operated in Portugal for over five years. In 2006, Kamov won the tender for the supply of Ka-32A11BC firefighting helicopters, to replace Aérospatiale SA 330 Pumas.

Over 240 Ka-32 have been built as of 2019 and have been exported to more than 30 countries; South Korea operates some 60 Ka-32s. In the mid-1990s Russia offset debt to South Korea through supplies of weapons.

Since the 1990s, China has purchased the Ka-28 export version and Ka-31 radar warning version for the PLAN fleet. Ka-31 purchases were first revealed in 2010. It is believed that Chinese Ka-28s have been equipped with more enhanced avionics compared to Ka-28s exported to other countries.

In 2013, Russia tested the new Kamov Ka-27M with an active electronically scanned array radar. The basis of the modernization of the Ka-27M is installed on the helicopter airborne radar with an active phased array antenna FH-A. This radar is part of the command and tactical radar system that combines several other systems: acoustic, magnetometric, signals intelligence and radar. All the information on them is displayed on the display instrumentation.

Ka-32s are used for construction of transmission towers for overhead power lines, as it has somewhat higher lift capacity than the Vertol 107. In Canada, the Ka-32 is used for selective logging as it is able to lift selective species vertically.

In August 2013, a Kamov Ka-32, C-GKHL operating in Bella Coola, British Columbia, Canada, experienced failure of one of its Klimov TV3-117BMA engines (manufactured by Motor Sich in Ukraine). The subsequent technical investigation indicated that there was poor quality control in the assembly of the compressor turbine, leading to failure of the complete unit after several compressor blades separated.

Ka-27s were used by the Ba'athist Syrian Navy during the Syrian Civil War.

On 21 June 2024, a Ka-29 was reportedly shot down over Crimea, by a Russian Pantsir-S1, during a Ukrainian drone attack involving both air and naval drones, killing the crew of four.

On 15 May 2026 a Ka-27 was destroyed during a Ukrainian drone attack on the Yeysk airport, Krasnodar oblast.

== Variants ==
=== Military ===
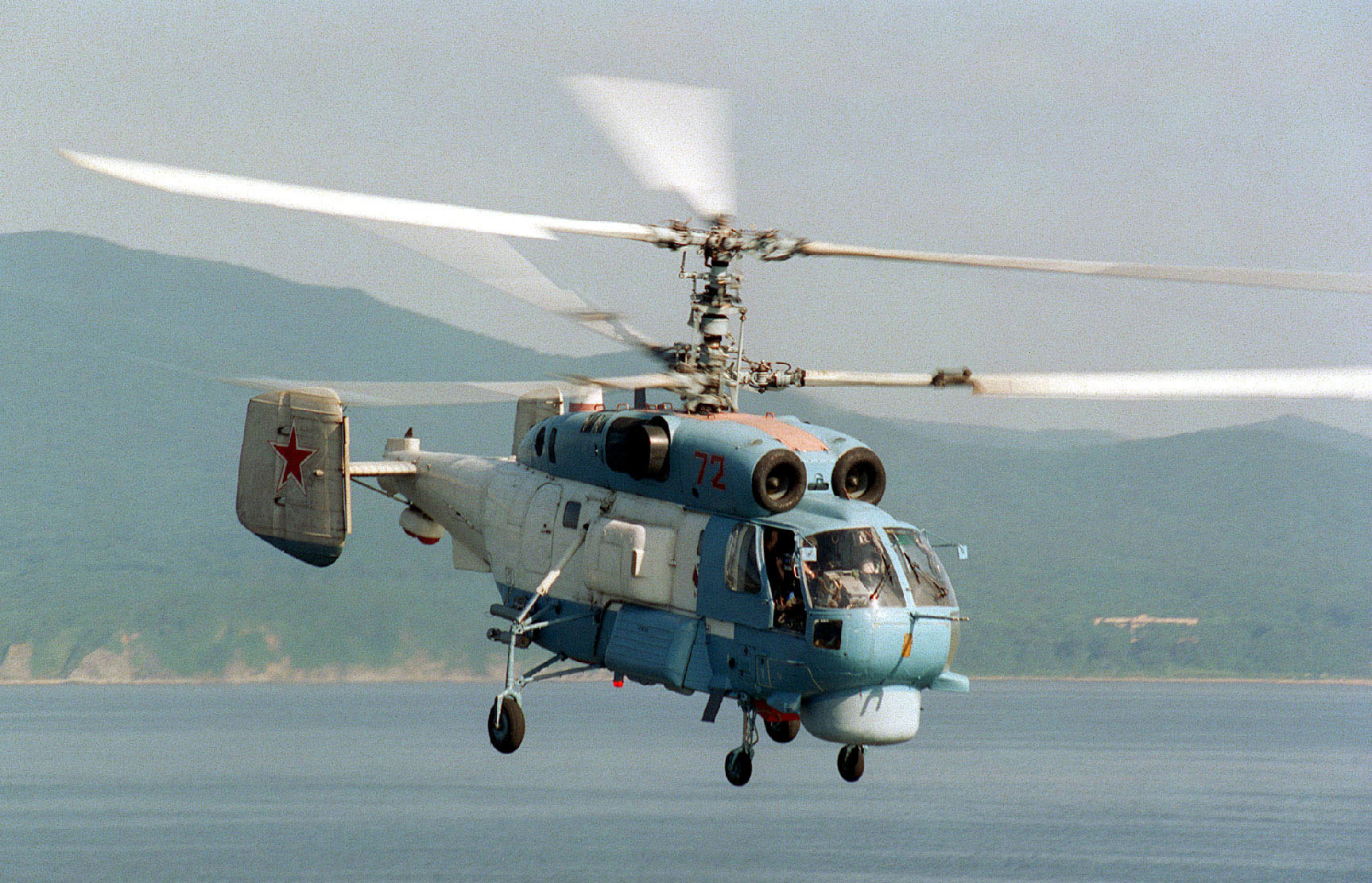
A Russian Navy Ka-27PS

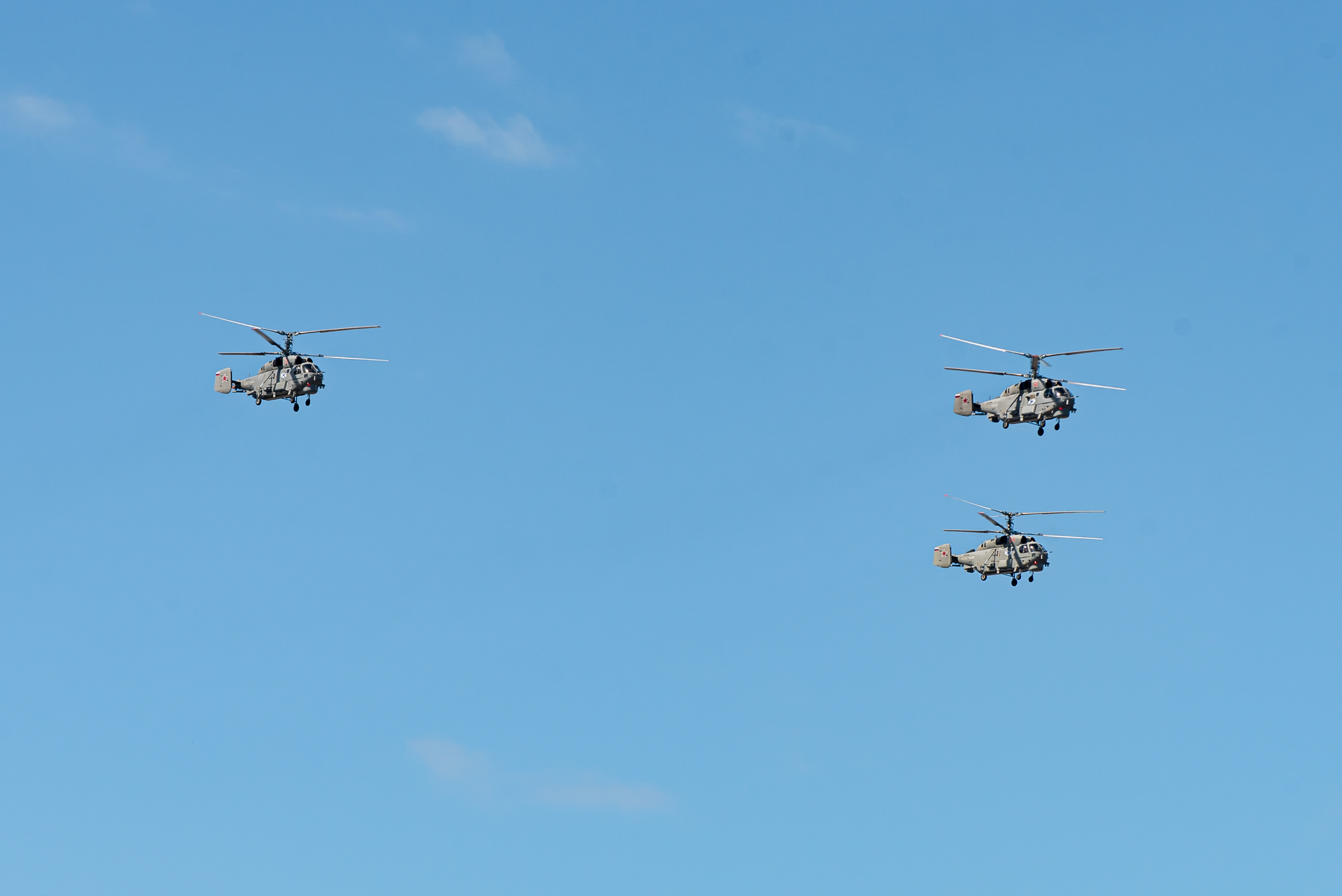
Three Russian Navy Ka-27M

==== Ka-252 ====
First prototype.

==== Ka-27K ====
Anti-submarine warfare prototype.

==== Ka-27PL ====
(Helix-A) Anti-submarine warfare helicopter.

==== Ka-27PS ====
(Helix-D) Search and rescue helicopter, ASW equipment removed and winch fitted. Fitted with 300 kg (660 lb) rescue hoist and hooks under fuselage for loads up to 5,000 kg (11,000 lb).

==== Ka-27PV ====
Armed version of the Ka-27PS.

==== Ka-27M ====
The latest modification of the helicopter, equipped with radar and tactical command systems that include the following systems: acoustic sensors, magnetometric sensors, signals intelligence, and FH-A radar with active phased array antenna. The radar is mounted under the fuselage and provides all-around vision in the search and detection of surface, air, and ground targets. Serial upgrading of Ka-27Ms to the level of combatant helicopters was planned to begin in 2014. By the end of 2016, 46 Ka-27PLs had been scheduled for modernization, commissioned by the Russian Navy. The first eight serial Ka-27M were transferred in December 2016. Mass production approved in June 2017 and started in early 2018. A new delivery of 5 helicopters arrived in October 2018. Half of the fleet is modernized as of December 2018. Variant reportely carried on modernized battlecruiser Admiral Nakhimov as of 2026

==== Ka-28 ====
(Helix-A) Export version of the Ka-27PL. Max takeoff weight increased to 12,000 kg (26,000 lb), as well max fuel and range also increased.

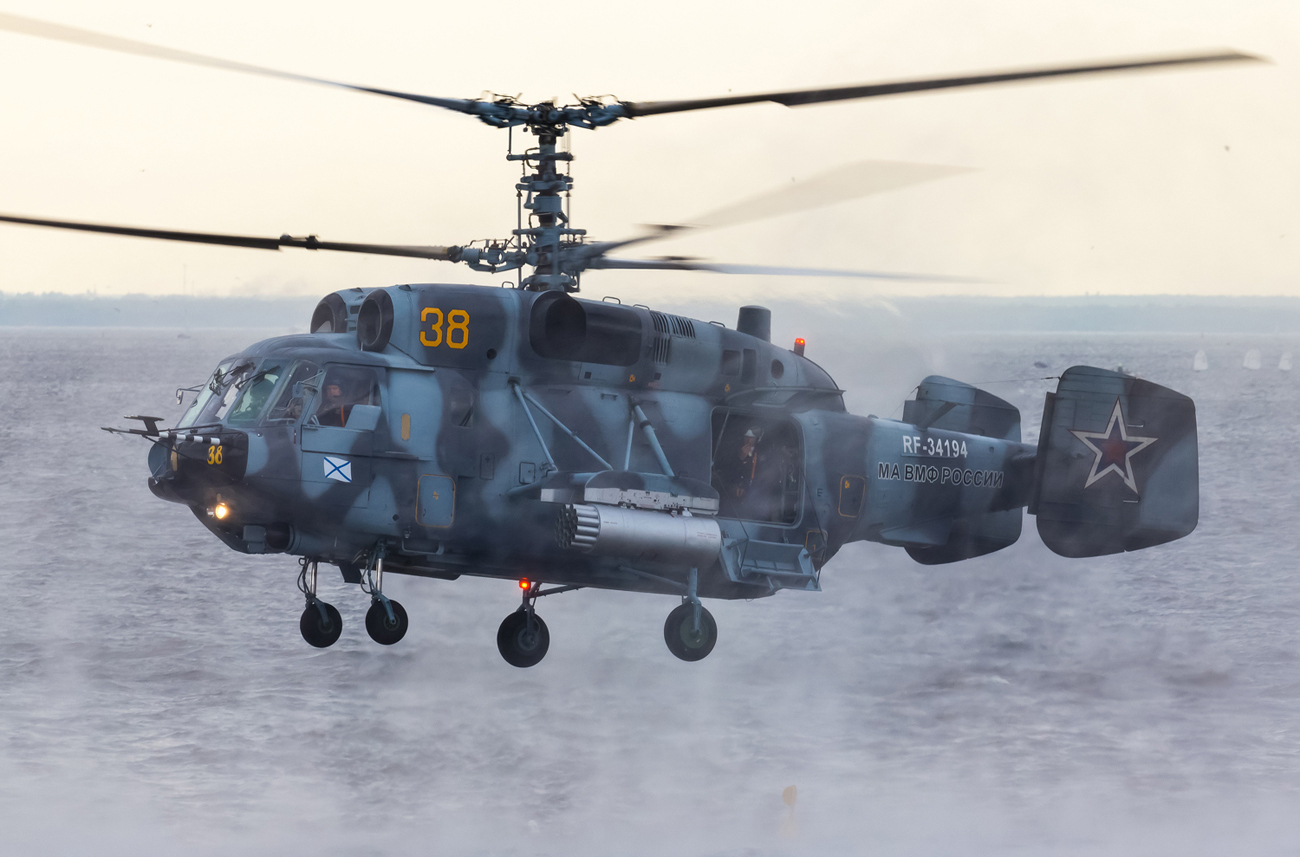
Ka-29

==== Ka-29TB ====
(Helix-B) Assault transport armored helicopter, operated from amphibious landing ships or aircraft carriers, with accommodation for two pilots and 16 troops. Equipped with 4 suspensions to carry rockets, guns, bombs and anti-tank missiles. Production began circa 1984 and over 60 were produced. It entered Soviet service in 1987. Other provisions include a single four-barreled 7.62 mm machine gun or 30 mm Shipunov 2A42. Currently under re-activation and upgrade with changed engines and installed modern arms and electronics, among others.

==== Ka-31 ====
: Early-warning helicopter.

=== Civil ===
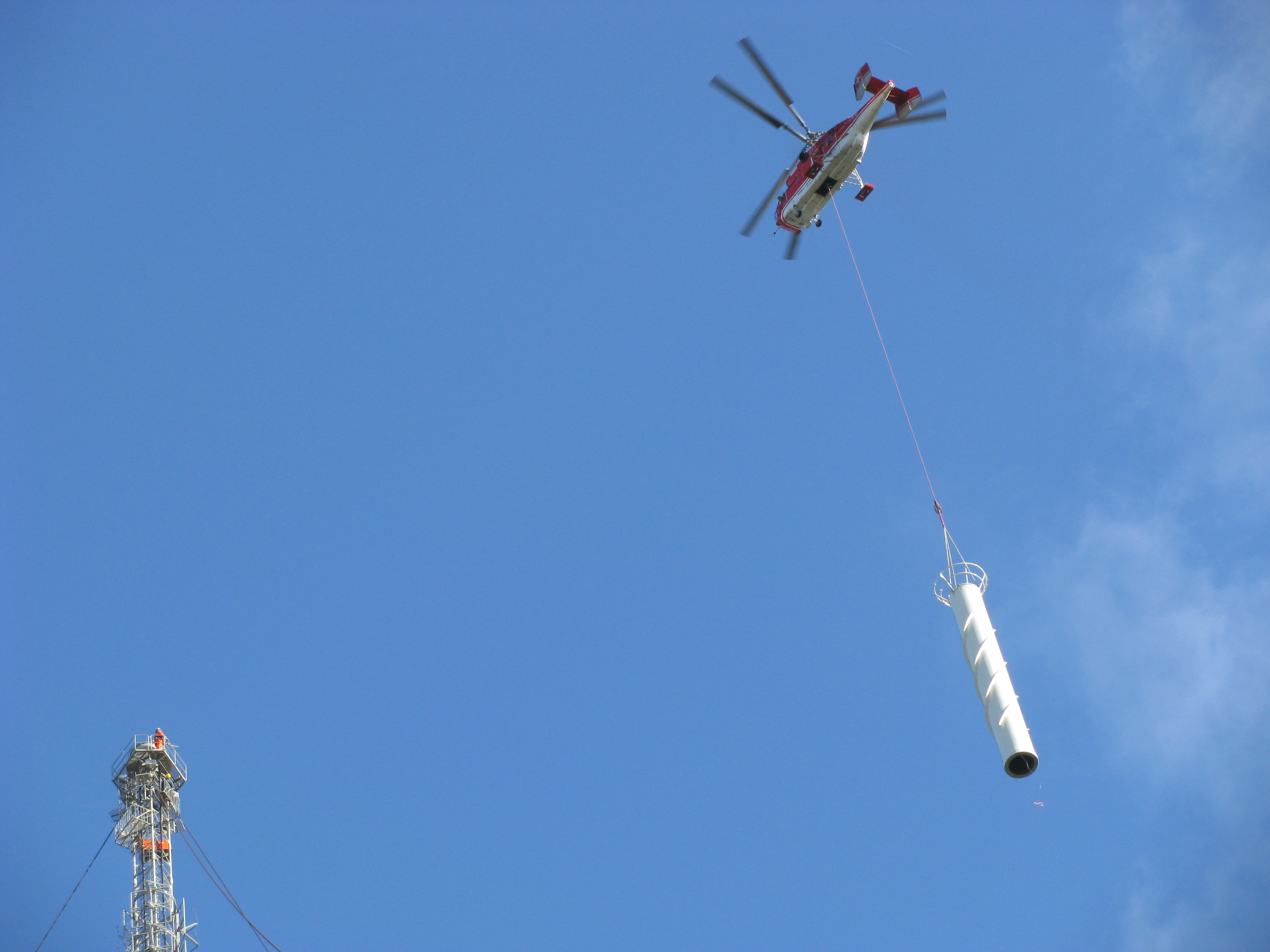
Heliswiss Ka-32 installs digital-TV transmitter in Århus, Denmark.

- Ka-32
  - Ka-32 pre-production prototype (1985): Exhibited at the 36th Paris Airshow in 1985.
  - Ka-32C (198x): Little-known custom version.
  - Ka-32T (1987): (Helix-C) Utility transport helicopter, with accommodation for two crew and 16 passengers.
    - Ka-32A (1990): Civil transport helicopter. Initial production version.
      - Ka-32A1 (1994): Fire fighting helicopter, equipped with a helicopter bucket.
      - Ka-32A2 (1994): Police version, equipped with two searchlights and a loudspeaker. Can carry 11 passengers.
      - Ka-32A7 (1994): Armed version of the Ka-27PS. Can carry 13 passengers. Has provisions to carry 2 x GSh-23L 23mm cannons, B-8V-20 rocket pods, 2 x Kh-35 anti-ship missiles or Kh-25 air-to-air missiles.
      - Ka-32A12 (1996): Swiss-registered and approved version.
      - Ka-32A11BC (1997): Canadian, Chinese, European-certified version with Klimov TV3-117MA engines and Glass Cockpit. Used by Pegasus Air Services, Indonesia.
        - Ka-32A11M (2012)
      - Ka-32A4 (1999): Special search and rescue, salvage and evacuation version.
    - Ka-32K (1991): Flying crane helicopter, fitted with a retractable gondola for a second pilot.
- Ka-32S (1987): (Helix-C) Maritime utility transport, search and rescue helicopter, fitted with an undernose radar. Designed for arctic environments.
- Ka-32M: Projected development with 1839kW TV3-117VMA-SB3 engines. Probably replaced by the Ka-32-10 project.

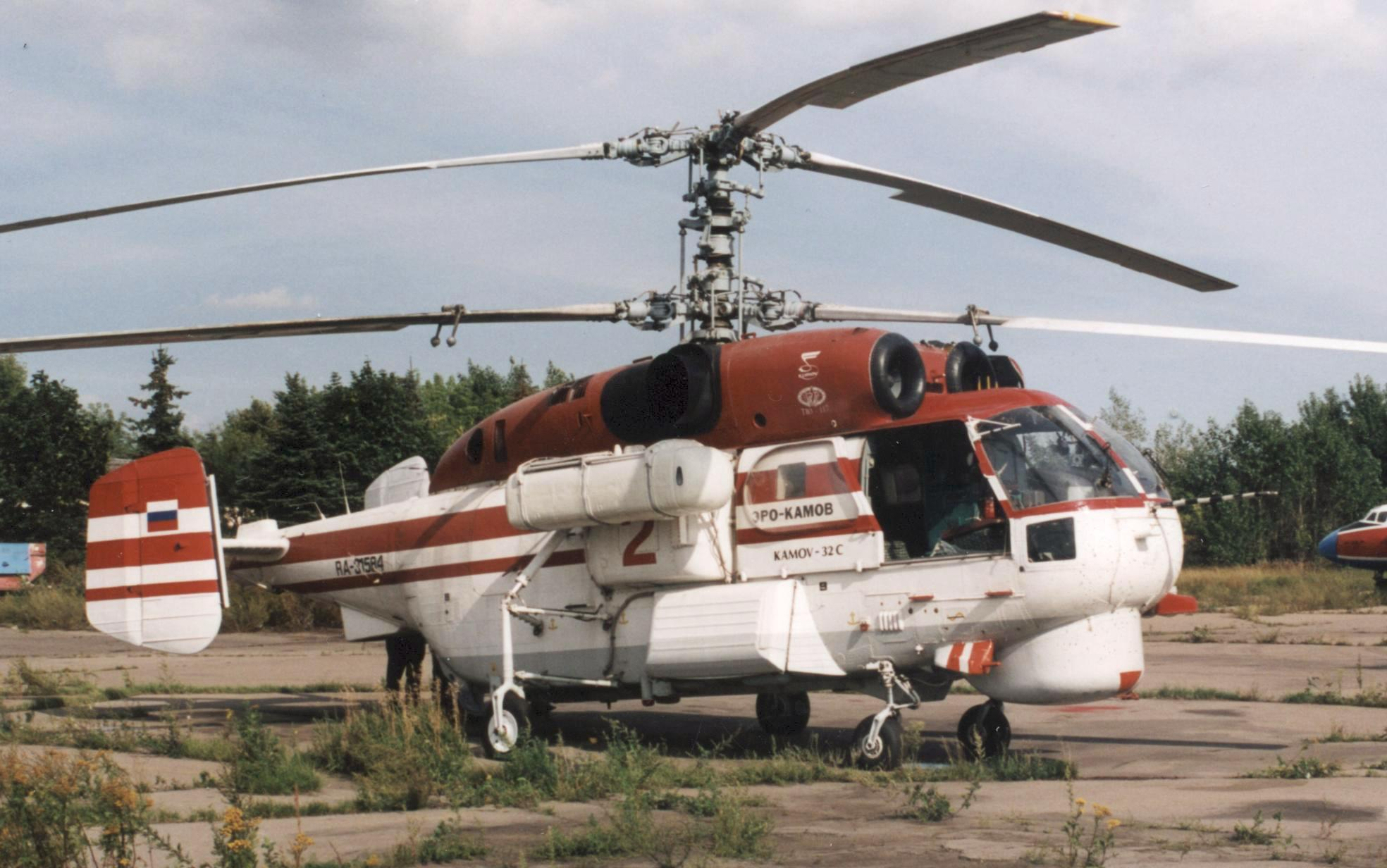
Kamov Ka-32S of Omega Helicopters at Moscow Bykovo airfield in 2004

== Operators ==
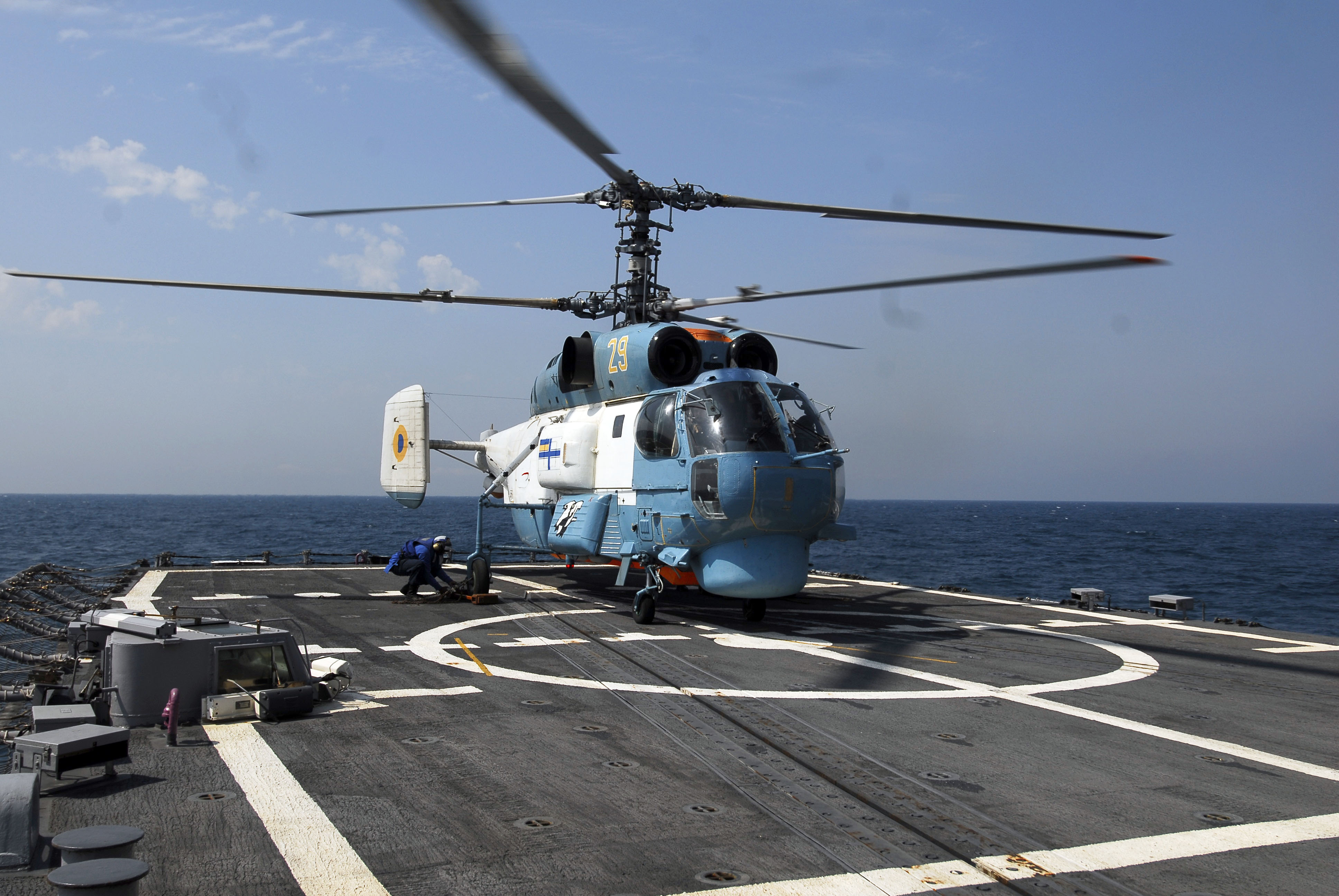
A Ukrainian Naval Aviation Ka-27 preparing for take off from USS Taylor

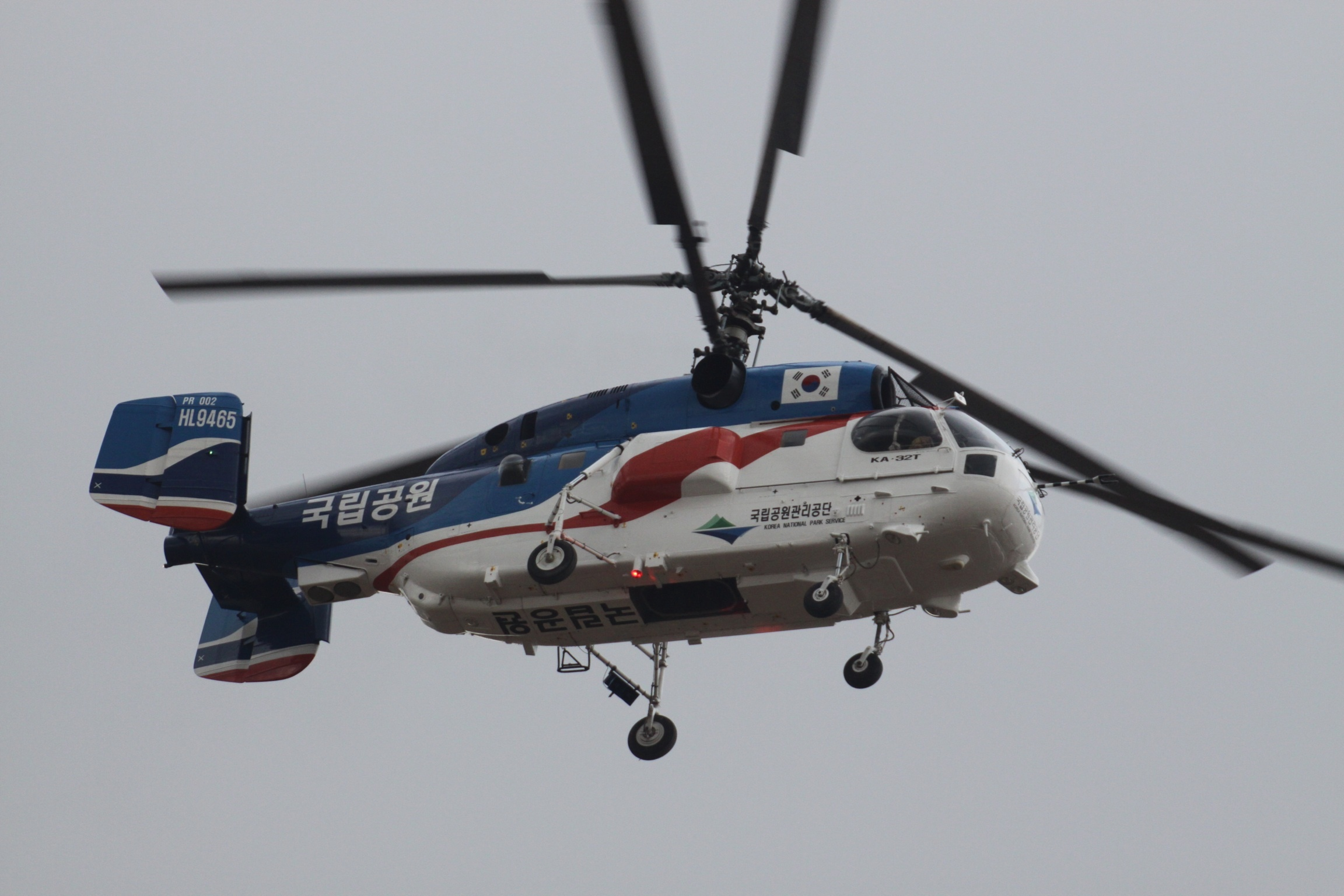
Ka-32 of Korea National Park Service

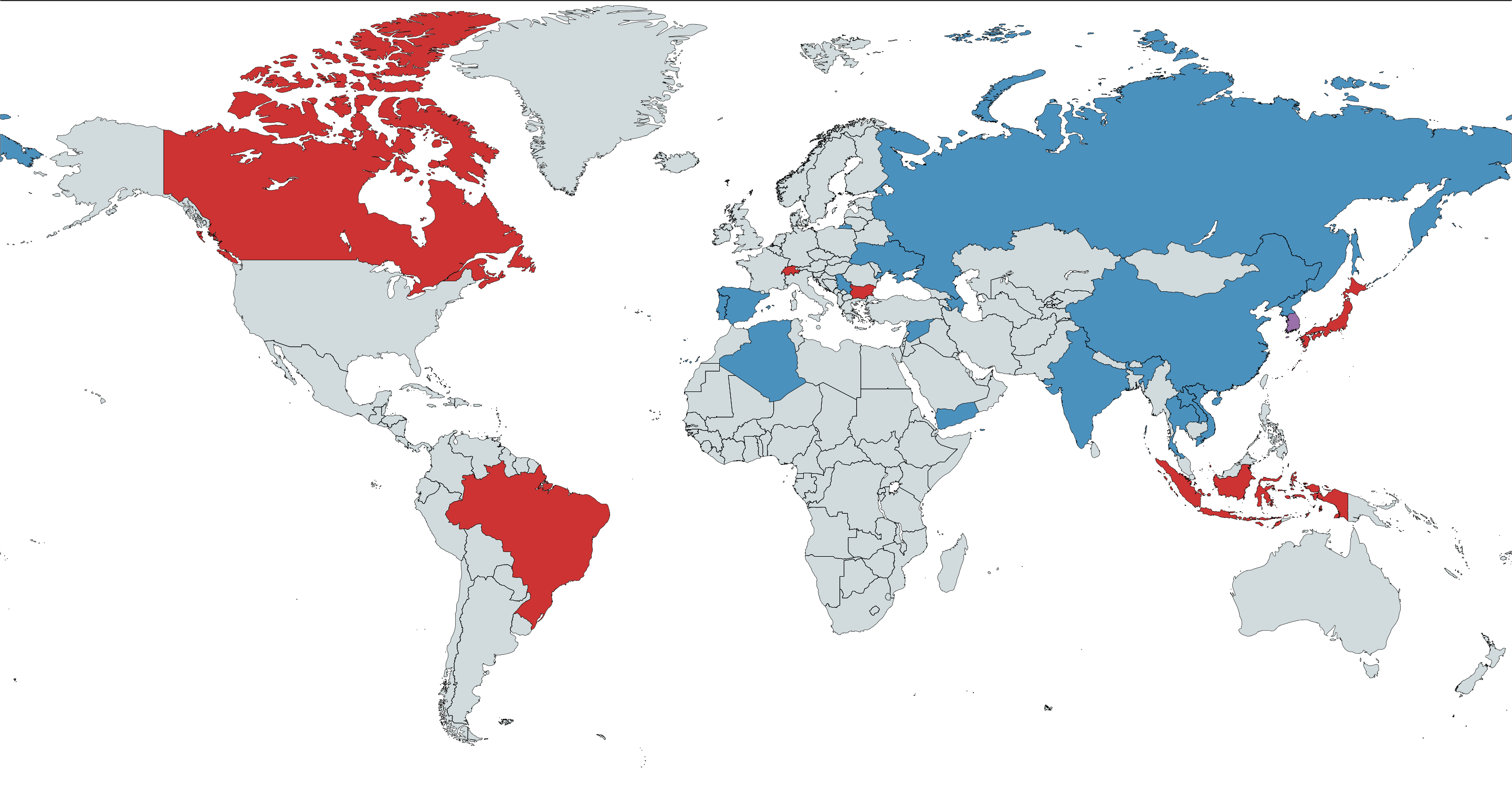
Map with military/government operators in blue, civilian operators in red, and operators in both fields in purple.

=== Military and government operators ===
Algeria

- Algerian Air Force- 12

Azerbaijan

- Azerbaijani Air Forces
- Ministry of Emergency Situations

China

- People's Liberation Army Naval Air Force

India

- Indian Navy- 20

Laos

- Lao People's Liberation Army Air Force

North Korea

- Korean People's Army Air Force

Russia

- Russian Naval Aviation
- Border Service of Russia

Serbia

- Serbian Police

South Korea

- Republic of Korea Air Force
- Republic of Korea Coast Guard
- National Fire Agency
- Korea Forest Service (29 in service)
- Korea National Park Service

Thailand

- Department of Disaster Prevention and Mitigation − 4 Ka-32A11BC variant.

Ukraine

- Main Directorate of Intelligence − Ka-32 variant
- Ukrainian Naval Aviation − operated by 10th Naval Aviation Brigade

Vietnam

- Vietnam People's Navy

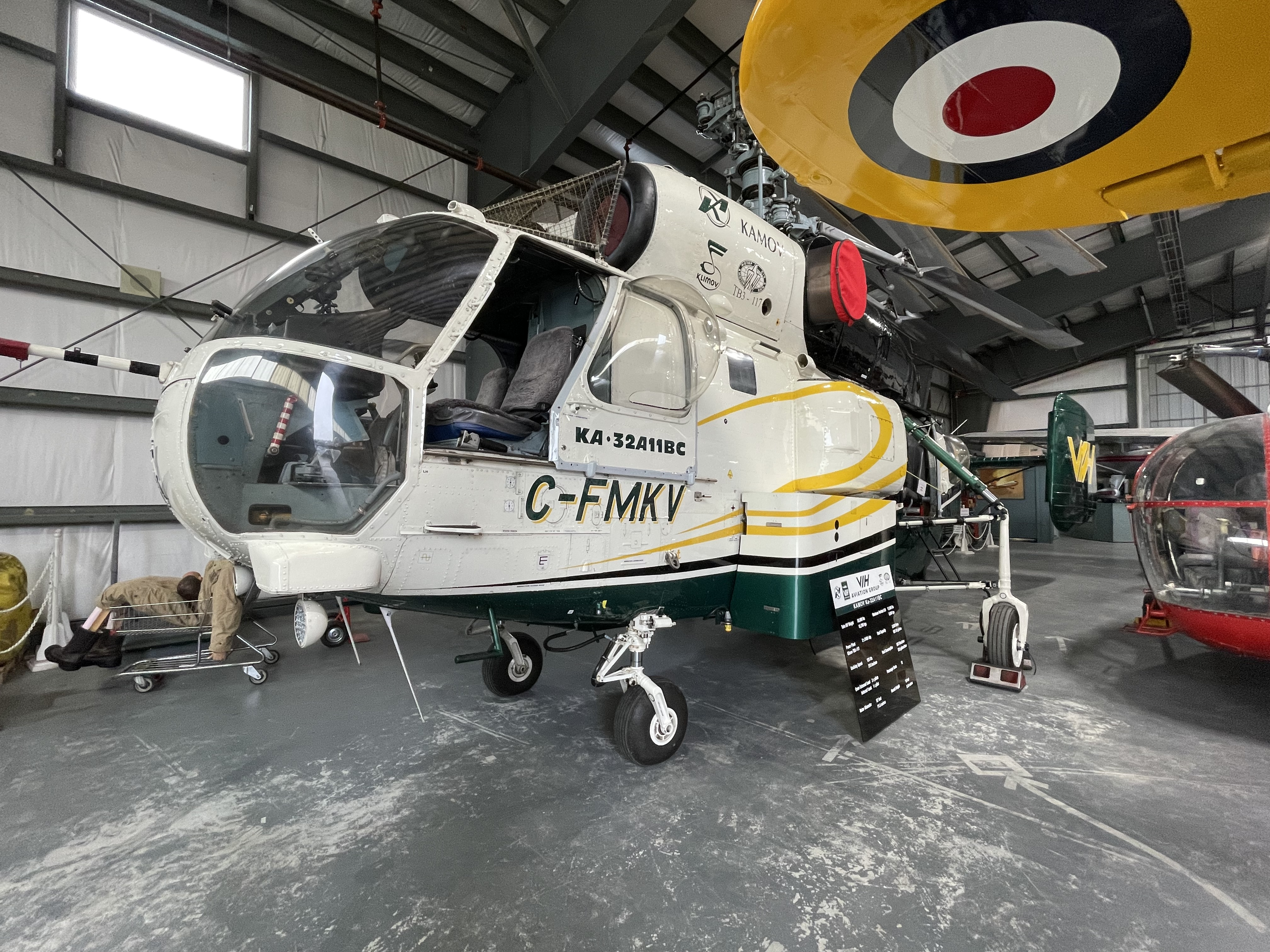
KA-32A11BC

=== Civilian operators ===
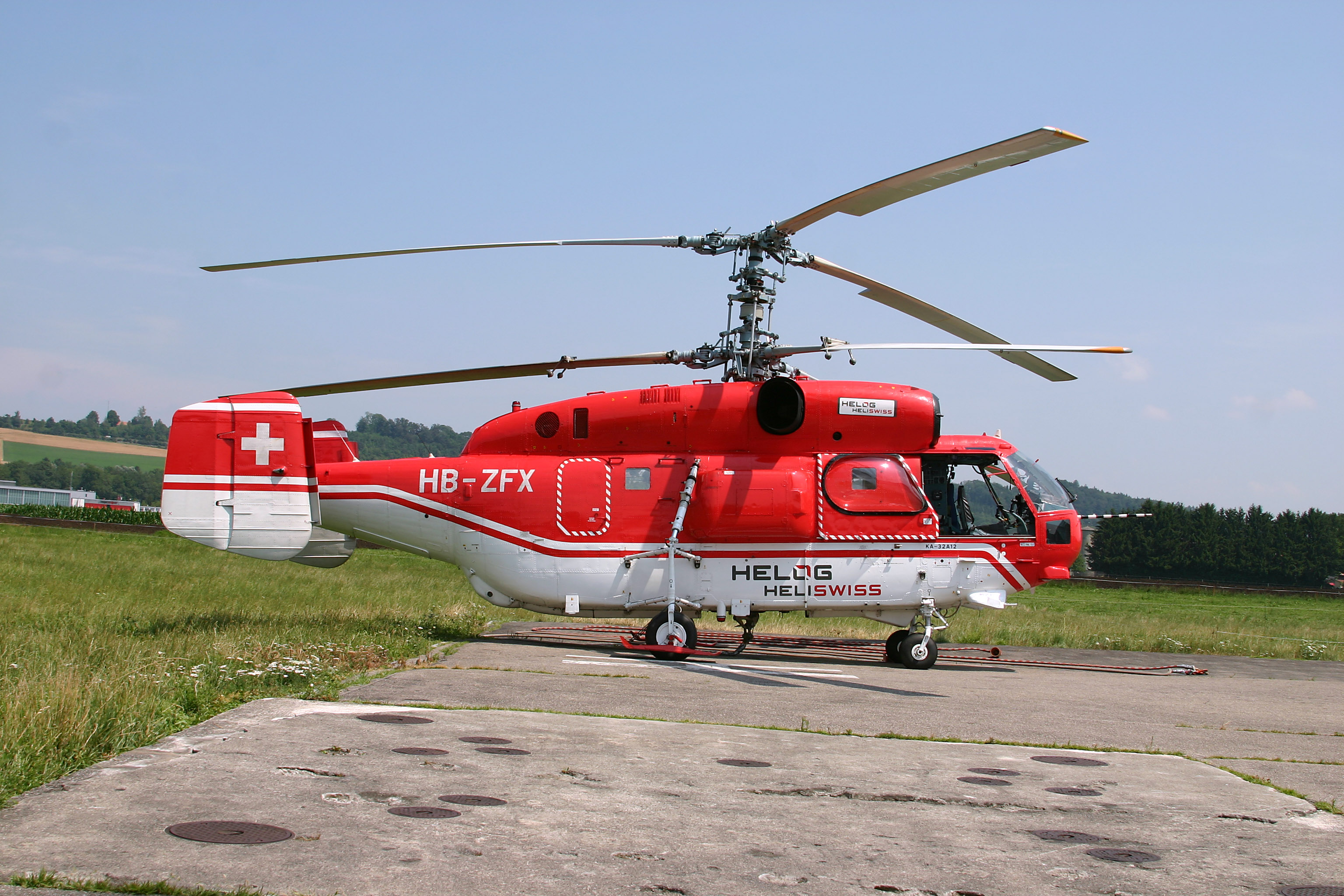
Ka-32 A12 of Heliswiss

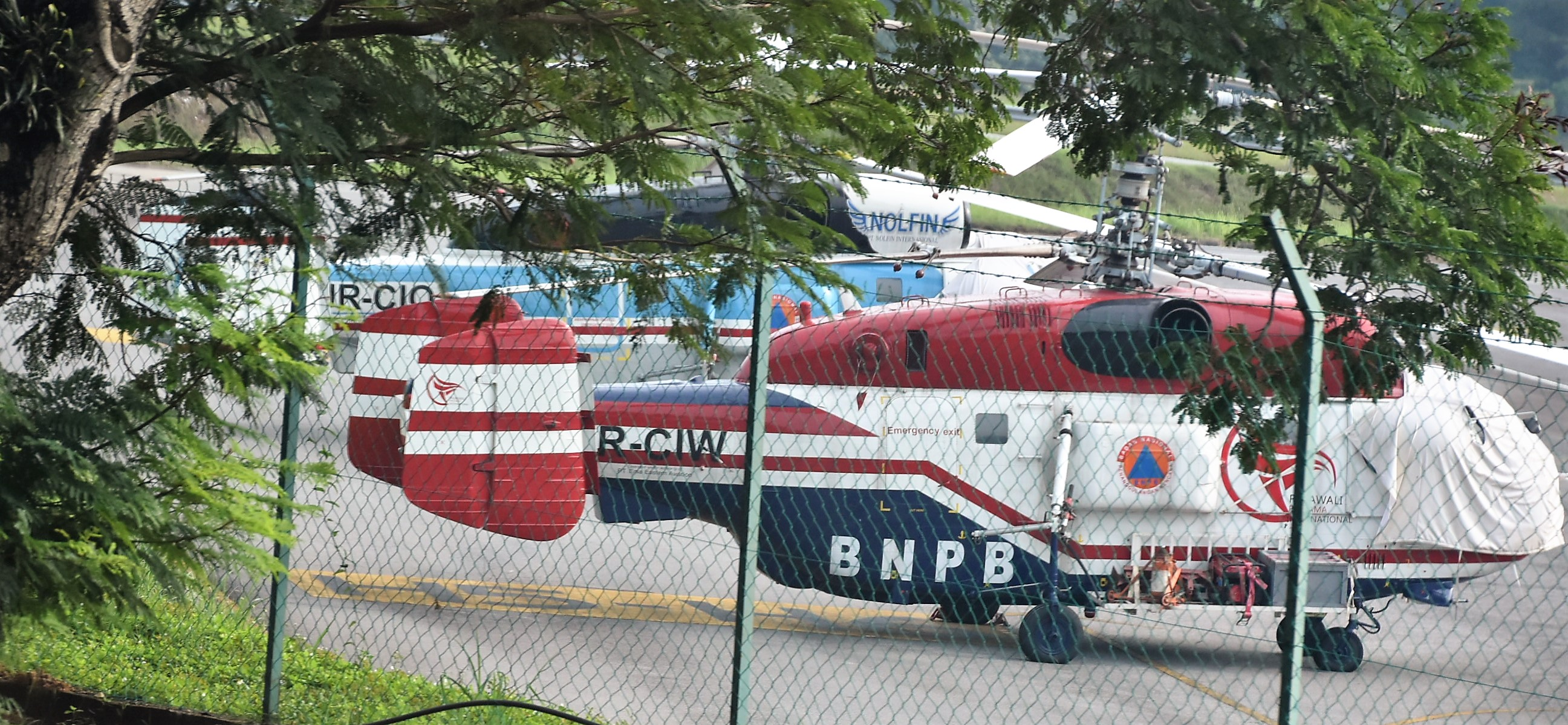
Kamov Ka-32T of BNPB

Brazil

- Helicargo

Bulgaria

- BH Air

Canada

- Vancouver Island Helicopters

Indonesia

- Pegasus Air Services (Leased by BNPB) Ka-32A11BC variant.
- Dimonim Air

Japan

- Akagi Helicopter

Republic of Korea

- Helikorea
- UB Air
- UI Helijet

Switzerland

- Heliswiss

=== Former operators ===
Portugal

- National Civil Protection Authority − Replaced by 6 Sikorsky UH-60 Black Hawk firefighting helicopters. 6 Ka-32s transferred to Ukraine in September 2024

Soviet Union
Spain

- Ministerio para la Transición Ecolológica y el Reto Demográfico

Syria

- Syrian Arab Air Force. The Syrian government of Al-Assad fell to rebels in late 2024, and the Syrian Arab Air Force was dismantled. It was re-established as Syrian Air Force, but the revolution, and the Israeli air strikes that followed it, wrecked havoc in the inventory of the Air Force. In late 2025, the World Air Forces publication by FlightGlobal, which tracks the aircraft inventories of world's air forces and publishes its counts annually, removed all Syrian Air Force's aircraft from their World Air Forces 2026 report. It is thus questionable if the Syrian Air Force has any flying aircraft in their inventory, and in particular, any Ka-27, as of December 2025.

Yemen

- Yemeni Air Force

Yugoslavia

- Yugoslav Air Force

== Specifications (Ka-27) ==
Data from

General characteristics

- Crew: one-three, plus two-three specialists (Ka-27)
- Capacity: 4,000 kg (8,818 lb) payload (Ka-32), or up to 16 troops (Ka-29).
- Length: 11.3 m (37 ft 1 in)
- Height: 5.5 m (18 ft 1 in)
- Empty weight: 6,500 kg (14,330 lb)
- Gross weight: 11,000 kg (24,251 lb)
- Max takeoff weight: 12,000 kg (26,455 lb)
- Powerplant: 2 × Isotov TV3-117V turboshaft engines, 1,660 kW (2,230 hp) each
- Main rotor diameter: 2 × 15.8 m (51 ft 10 in)
- Main rotor area: 392.2 m^{2} (4,222 sq ft) 3-bladed contra-rotating rotors

Performance

- Maximum speed: 270 km/h (170 mph, 150 kn)
- Cruise speed: 205 km/h (127 mph, 111 kn)
- Range: 980 km (610 mi, 530 nmi)
- Service ceiling: 5,000 m (16,000 ft)

Armament
Ka-27

- 1 × torpedoes (AT-1M, VTT-1, UMGT-1 Orlan, APR-2 Yastreb) or 36 RGB-NM & RGB-NM-1 sonobuoys

Ka-29TB

- 1 × mobile forward firing GShG-7.62 machine gun with 1800 rounds,
- 1 × 30 mm 2A42 cannon with 250 rounds (flexible semi-rigid mount, optional/removable with ammunition carried in cabin)
- four external hardpoints for bombs, rockets, gunpods, munitions dispensers, special four round missile launchers for the 9K114 Shturm

Avionics

- Radar, MAD or dipping sonar, sonobuoys

== See also ==
Related development

- Kamov Ka-25
- Kamov Ka-31

Aircraft of comparable role, configuration, and era

- Kaman SH-2G Super Seasprite
- Eurocopter AS565 Panther
- Harbin Z-20
- SH-60 Seahawk
- Westland Lynx
- Mitsubishi H-60

Related lists

- List of military aircraft of the Soviet Union and the CIS
- List of rotorcraft
