= Ukrainian Naval Aviation =

Component of the Ukrainian Navy

- Морська Авіація
- Sleeve patch of the UNA
- Founded: April 5, 1992
- Country: Ukraine
- Allegiance: Armed Forces of Ukraine
- Branch: Ukrainian Navy
- Type: Naval aviation
- Role: Fleet reconnaissance, patrolling coasts for enemy ships and submarines
- Size: 2,500
- Part of: Navy Command
- Garrison/HQ: Ochakiv, Mykolaiv Oblast
- Engagements: Operation Ocean Shield; Operation Atalanta; Russo-Ukrainian War

Commanders
- Current commander: Colonel Oleh Zahurskyi
- Notable commanders: Colonel Ihor Bedzai †

Insignia
- Ukrainian Navy Ensign

- Roundel

- Fin flash

Aircraft flown
- Multirole helicopter: Westland Sea King
- Patrol: Ka-27, Ka-29
- Reconnaissance: Bayraktar TB2
- Trainer: An-2
- Transport: An-26, Mi-8, Mi-14PL, Ka-226

The Ukrainian Naval Aviation (Ukrainian: Морська Авіація, romanized: Morska Aviatsiya, IPA: [morˈsʲkɑ ɐwiˈɑts⁽ʲ⁾ijɐ]) is a component of the Ukrainian Navy.

During the breakup of the Soviet Union, significant portions of the Soviet Naval Aviation were based in Ukraine, which were intended to support the Black Sea Fleet. These forces included the 2nd Guards Maritime Missile Aviation Division (Gvardeyskoye, Crimean Oblast), with three regiments of maritime attack Tu-22M2s (5th, 124th at Gvardeskoye, Crimean Oblast and the 943rd at Oktyabrskoye), and the 30th independent Maritime Reconnaissance Aviation Regiment (Saki-Novofedorovka, Crimean Oblast) of Tu-22Ps.

In the second half of 1997, when Ukraine and Russia agreed on how to split the Black Sea Fleet, Ukraine received 12 planes and 30 helicopters.

== History ==
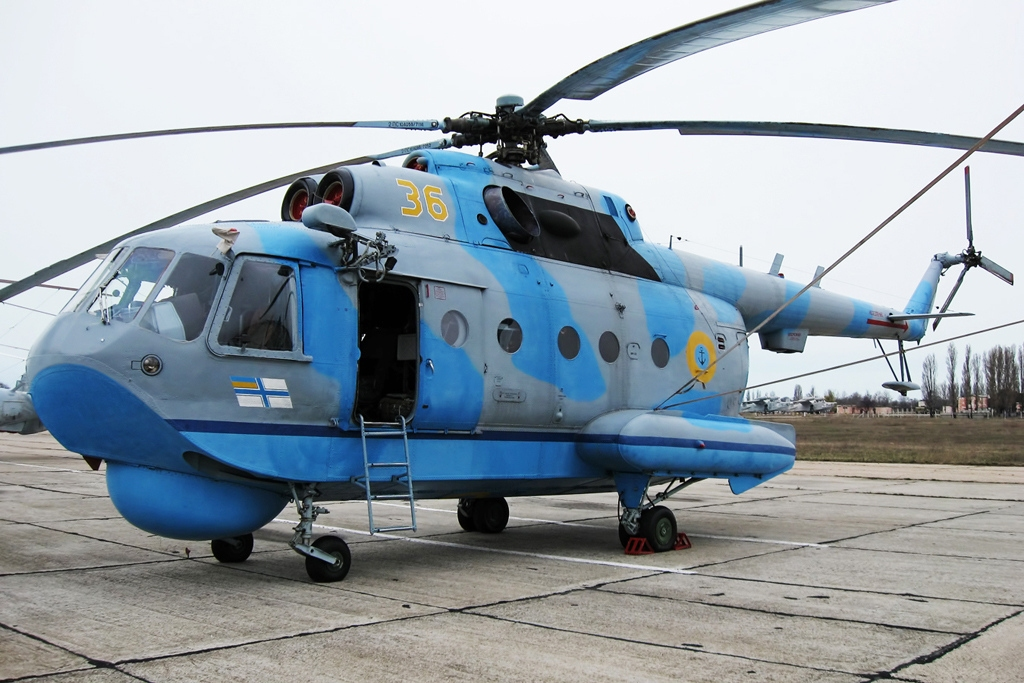
A Ukrainian Navy Mi-14

Ukraine inherited large naval aviation units from the Soviet Union. These included large aircraft such as the Tupolev Tu-142 and Tupolev Tu-22M, however these were scrapped under the Budapest Memorandum. Fighters such as the Mig-29 were either decommissioned due to budgetary reasons or transferred to the air force.

The remaining inventory included transport, attack, and anti-submarine warfare helicopters, as well as numerous transport aircraft. Ukraine's naval units, along with some aviation units participated in several deployments such as Operation Atalanta and Operation Ocean Shield.

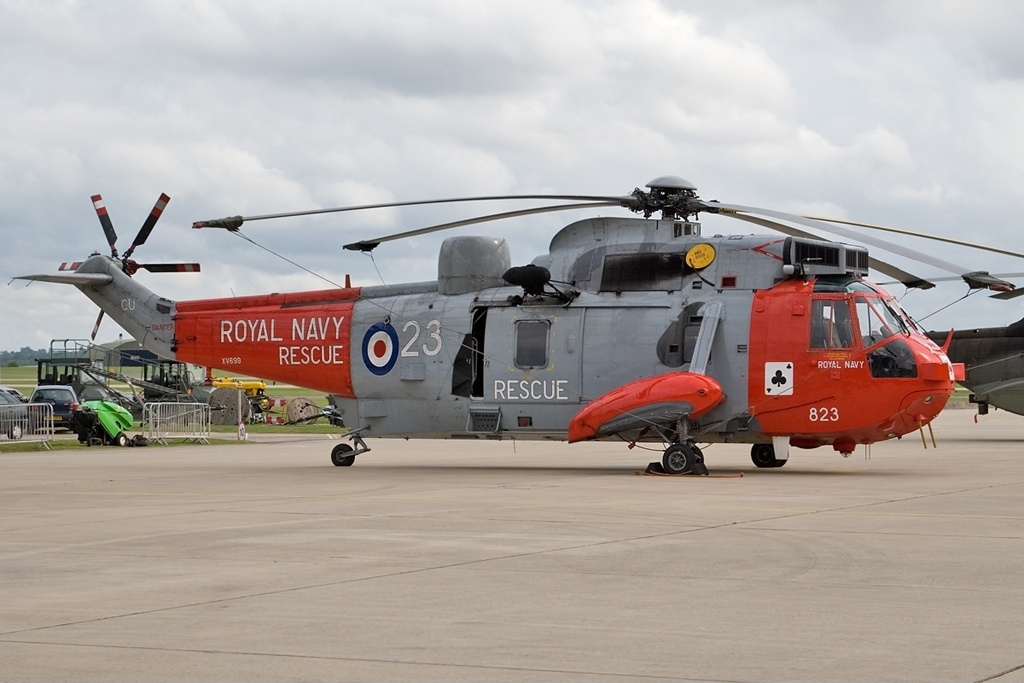
A Royal Navy Sea King helicopter, the same model now used by the Ukrainian Naval Aviation

=== 2014 Russian annexation of Crimea ===
During the Russian military intervention in Ukraine, Ukrainian naval aviation managed to get a number of its aircraft and helicopters airborne from its Novofedorivka airbase to fly to bases in mainland Ukraine on 5 March. This included one Kamov Ka-27PL and three Mil Mi-14PL maritime helicopters, and one Beriev Be-12 amphibian and two Antonov An-26 transports.

More than a dozen aircraft and helicopters, which were undergoing maintenance, had to be left behind. The long-term sustainability of the Ukrainian Navy's surviving helicopters is uncertain after the pro-Russian administration in Crimea nationalised all state owned enterprises, including the Sevastopol Aviation Enterprise, which had provided long-term maintenance and overhaul of the service's helicopters.

=== 2022 Russian invasion of Ukraine ===
During the 2022 Russian invasion of Ukraine, on 7 May, Ukraine confirmed that Colonel Ihor Bedzay, the deputy commander of the Ukrainian Navy, was killed in action. His Mi-14PS was shot down by a Russian Sukhoi Su-35. The Ukrainian Navy also operates the Baykar Bayraktar TB2 drone along with the Ukrainian Air Force. In November 2022 it was revealed by the UK Defence Secretary Ben Wallace that 3 former Royal Navy Sea King helicopters would be sent to Ukraine, to provide anti-submarine warfare and combat search and rescue (CSAR) capabilities.

On the 22 February 2025, a Ukrainian Navy Sea King helicopter crashed near Kulbakine Air Base, injuring the crew and leaving the airframe damaged.

== Organization ==
10th Naval Aviation Brigade

All naval aircraft in service are controlled by the 10th Naval Aviation Brigade in Mykolaiv.

- 10th Naval Aviation Brigade, Mykolaiv
  - Headquarters & Headquarters Company
  - Air Squadron
  - Helicopter Squadron
  - Signal & Radio-technical Support Battalion
  - Airfield & Technical Support Battalion
  - Aviation Technical & Operational Engineering
  - Helicopter Technical & Operational Engineering
  - CSAR Company
  - Logistic Company
  - Meteorological Company
  - Engineer Platoon
  - Security Platoon

One Kamov Ka-27 helicopter is to be stationed on the Hetman Sahaidachnyi (a Krivak III-class frigate). The frigate is able however carry a maximum of two helicopters.

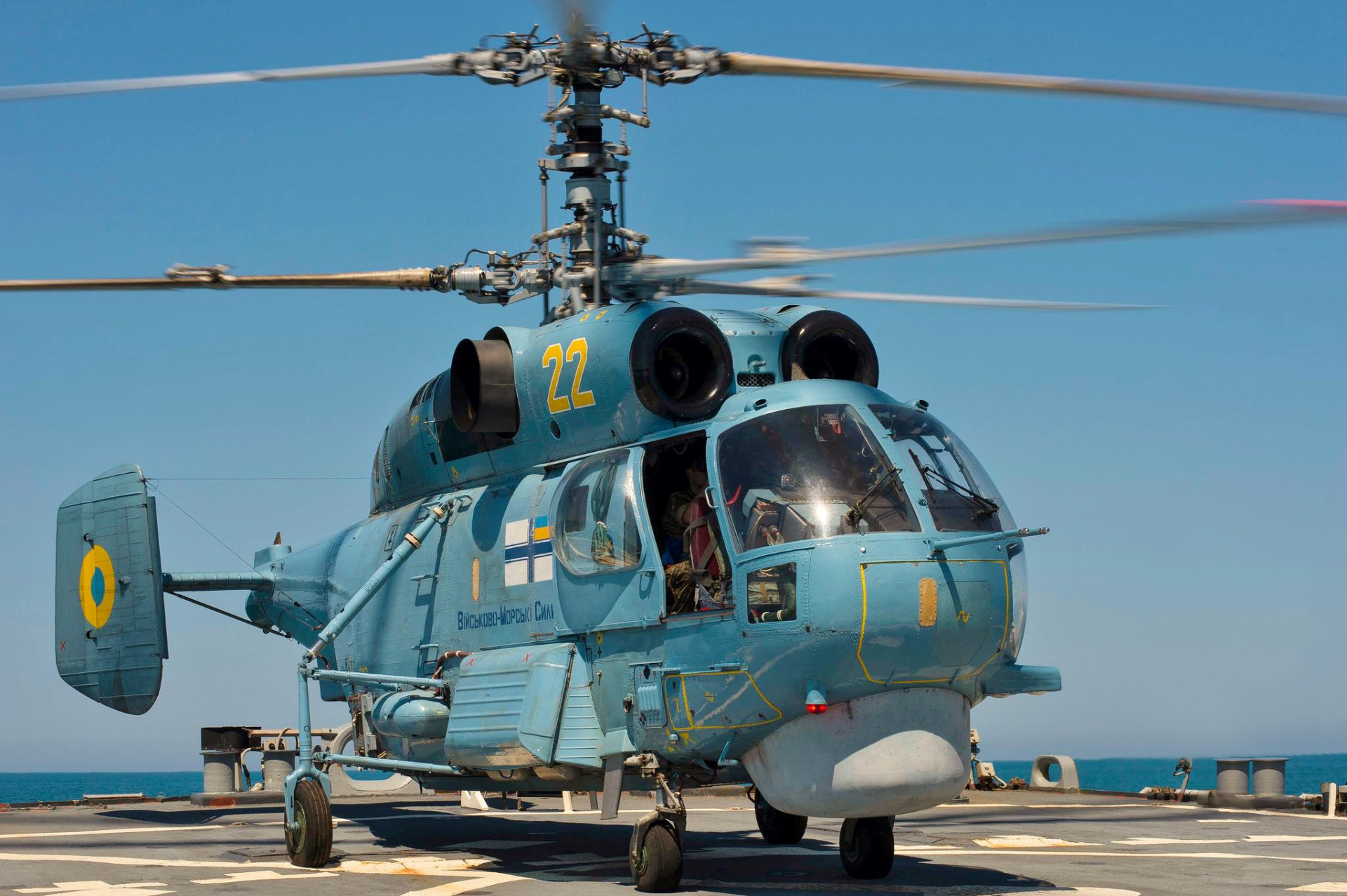
A Ukrainian Ka-27 lands aboard the USS Donald Cook during Exercise Sea Breeze 2015

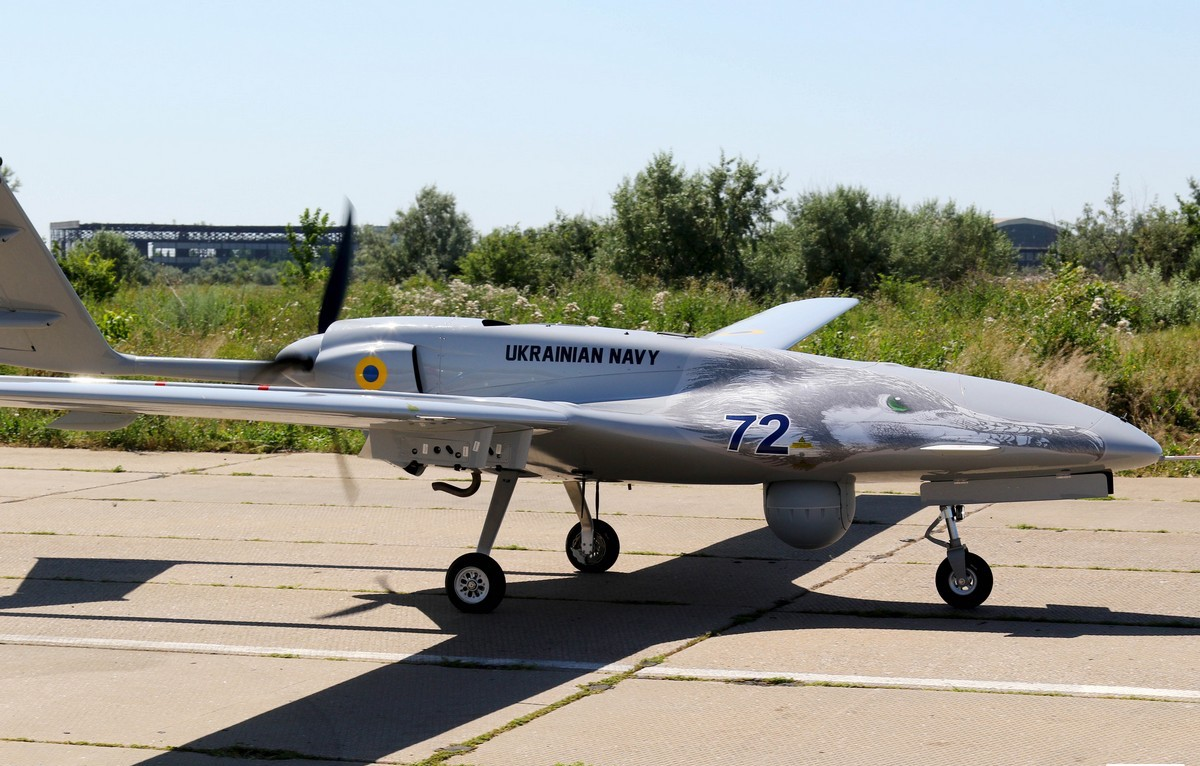
A Ukrainian Navy Bayraktar TB2

== Equipment ==
=== Current inventory ===
Aircraft	Origin	Type	Variant	NATO reporting name	In service	Notes
Transport
Antonov An-26	Soviet Union	Transport	An-26B-100	Curl-A	2	2 in storage.
Helicopters
Mil Mi-8	Soviet Union / Ukraine	Utility	Mi-8MSB-V	Hip	2+	Upgraded by the Motor Sich company.
Mil Mi-14	Soviet Union	Anti-submarine helicopter	Mi-14PL; Mi-14PS	Haze-A	4	
Kamov Ka-27	Soviet Union	Anti-submarine helicopter		Helix-A	4	
Kamov Ka-226	Russia	Light utility helicopter		Hoodlum	1	
Westland Sea King	United Kingdom	Utility	HU5Mk.41		3	Six also pledged by Germany in January 2024.
Trainer aircraft
Antonov An-2	Soviet Union	Utility aircraft	An-2T; An-2R	Colt	2	Used by the 10th Naval Aviation Brigade.
Combat Drones
Baykar Bayraktar TB2	Turkey	Umanned combat aerial vehicle (UCAV)				

=== Retired aircraft ===
- Mikoyan MiG-29A − Transferred to the Ukrainian Air Force
- Sukhoi Su-17 − Transferred to the Ukrainian Air Force
- Sukhoi Su-25 − Transferred to the Ukrainian Air Force
- Yakovlev Yak-38 Decommissioned in early 1990s.
- Tupolev Tu-16
- Tu-22M − Scrapped following the nuclear disarmament treaty
- Beriev Be-12 − Non-operational by February 2023
- Antonov An-12 − Transferred to the Ukrainian Air Force
- Antonov An-24 − Transferred to the Ukrainian Air Force
- Ilyushin Il-18
- Tupolev Tu-134 − Transferred to the Ukrainian Air Force.
- Kamov Ka-25
- Kamov Ka-29
- Mil Mi-6

== Bibliography ==
- Hoyle, Craig (December 2023). World Air Forces 2024. FlightGlobal (Report). London: Flight Global Insight.
- Wragg, David (23 February 2011). The World Air Power Guide. Casemate Publishers. ISBN 978-1-84468-784-8.
- International Institute for Strategic Studies (1995). The Military Balance 1995-1996. Oxford University Press. ISBN 978-0-19-828055-2.
- International Institute for Strategic Studies (2004). Langton, Christopher (ed.). The Military Balance 2004/2005. Oxford University Press. ISBN 978-0-19-856622-9.
- International Institute for Strategic Studies (15 February 2023). The Military Balance 2023 (Report) (1st ed.). Routledge. ISBN 978-1032508955.
- International Institute for Strategic Studies (2024). "Chapter Four: Russia and Eurasia". The Military Balance. 124 (1): 158–217. doi:10.1080/04597222.2024.2298592. ISSN 0459-7222.
