= Mil Mi-14 =

Helicopter in the Soviet Union

Mi-14
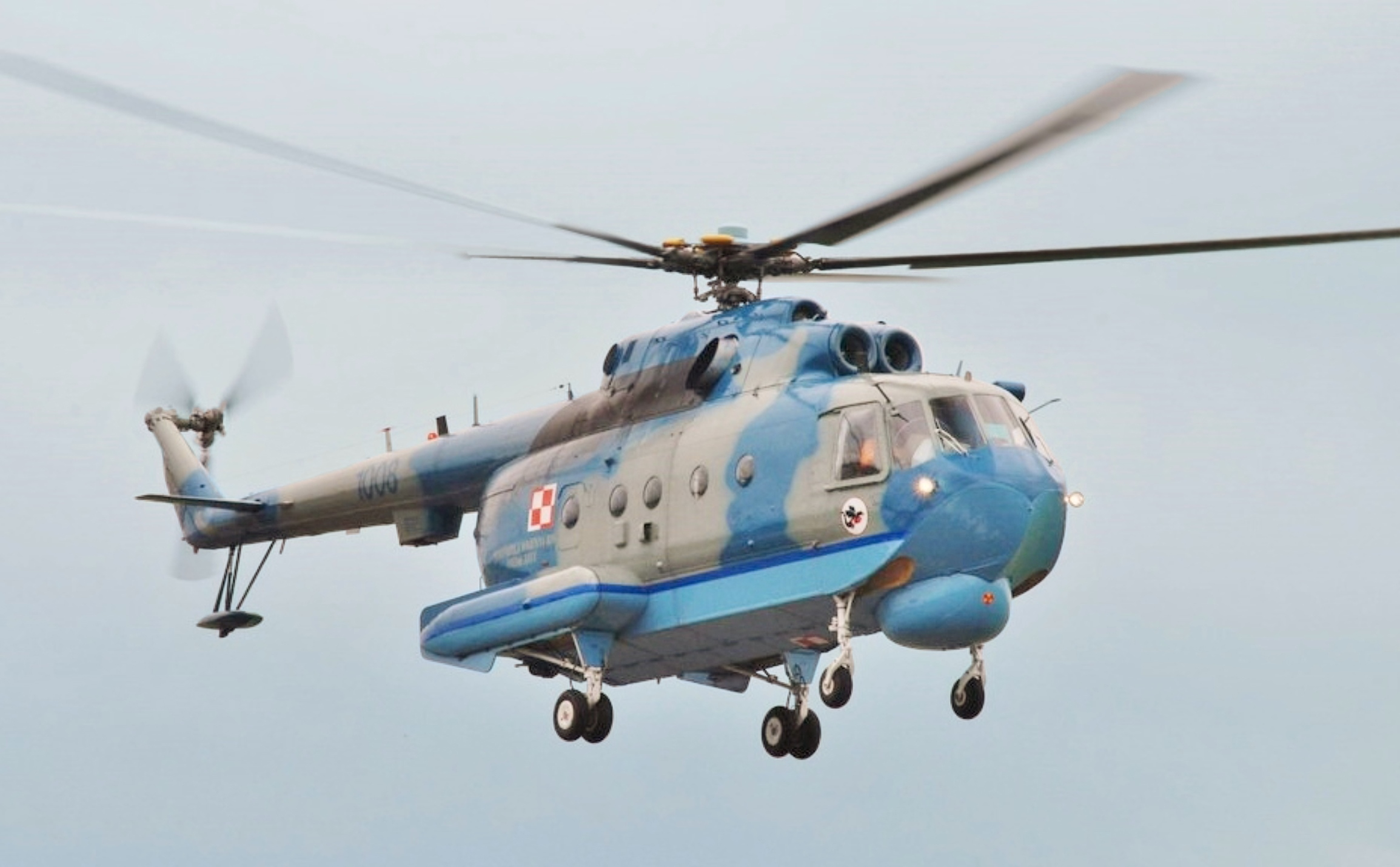
- Polish Navy Mil Mi-14PL in 2011

General information
- Type: Anti-submarine helicopter
- National origin: Soviet Union
- Manufacturer: Mil Moscow Helicopter Plant
- Status: In service
- Primary users: Soviet Navy Russian Navy; Ukrainian Navy; Polish Navy
- Number built: 273

History
- Manufactured: 1969-1986
- Introduction date: 1976
- First flight: 1 August 1967
- Developed from: Mil Mi-8

The Mil Mi-14 (Russian: Миль Ми-14, NATO reporting name: Haze) is a Soviet shore-based nuclear-capable amphibious anti-submarine helicopter derived from the earlier Mi-8.

== Design and development ==
Formal development of an anti-submarine warfare (ASW) version of the Mil Mi-8 transport helicopter was authorised by the Soviet Communist Party Central Committee and Council of Ministers in April 1965, with the objective of replacing the Mil Mi-4 in the short-range, shore based anti-submarine role. The new helicopter was required to have an endurance of 2 hours on station at a radius of 222 kilometres (120 nmi; 138 mi) from base.

The new design (with the internal designation V-14) differed from the Mi-8 in having a boat-like hull similar to the Sea King, allowing it to operate off the water, and a retractable four-point undercarriage, (Note: The first retractable undercarriage to be used in a Soviet helicopter.) with the mainwheels retracting into large sponsons on the rear of the fuselage. The helicopter was to be powered by two Klimov TV3-117MT turboshaft engines. A watertight weapons bay is fitted to the centreline of the fuselage allowing internal carriage of a single torpedo or eight depth charges, while a radome housing a search radar is fitted beneath the nose.

The Mi-14 has a crew of four: a pilot, a copilot, an onboard technician, and a weapon system operator. The Mi-14PL anti-submarine version is equipped with a radar, a dipping sonar and a magnetic anomaly detector.

The first prototype V-14, converted from a Mi-8 and powered by the older and less powerful Klimov TV2-117 engines, flew on 1 August 1967. Development was slowed by problems with the helicopter's avionics and due to reliability problems with the TV3-117 engines, with production at Kazan not starting until 1973, and the helicopter (now designated Mi-14) entering service on 11 May 1976.

In January 2016, Russian Helicopters confirmed to Russian News Agency TASS that no final decision to revive production had been taken, but market demand, feasibility studies – including with Moscow's defence ministry – and funding sources were under review. The programme remains a “priority” for Russian Helicopters. The company suggested the Mi-14 would appeal to civil operators in Russia's far north and those supplying the oil and gas industry, alongside the nation's armed forces. Out of the almost 300 Mi-14s produced at Kazan Helicopters between 1973 and 1986, it is estimated that just 44 examples remain in active service.

== Variants ==
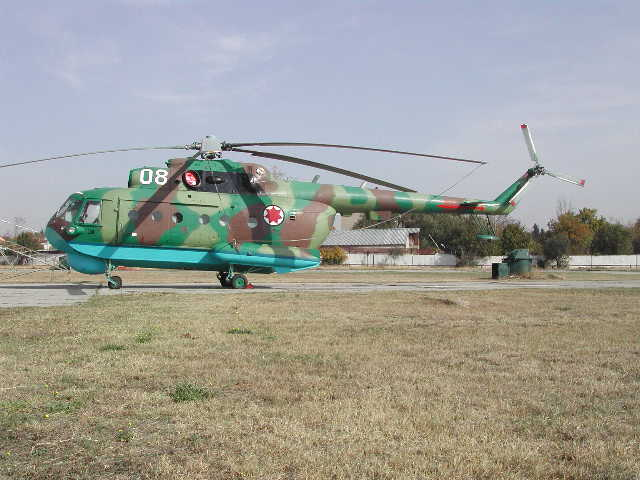
Georgian Mi-14

V-14
Prototype of the Mi-14 helicopter.
Mi-14PL (NATO Haze-A)
Anti-submarine warfare helicopter, equipped with towed APM-60 MAD, OKA-2 sonobuoys and a retractable Type 12-M search radar, armed with either a single AT-1 or APR-2 torpedo, one Skat nuclear depth bomb or eight depth charges. A single Mi-14PL was used to carry out trials with the Kh-23 (NATO designation AS-7 Kerry) air-to-surface missile but this modification does not seem to have entered service.
Mi-14PLM
Improved anti-submarine warfare version with Os'minog ASW suite, with new search radar, dipping sonar and digital computer. Limited use.
Mi-14PŁ/R
Polish conversion of two Mi-14PŁ (Polish designation for Mi-14PL) to search and rescue version, with ASW equipment removed, developed in 2010.
Mi-14BT (NATO Haze-B)
Mine sweeping helicopter with ASW systems removed and equipped for towing Mine Countermeasures sleds. 25–30 built, with six exported to East Germany and two to Bulgaria.
Mi-14PS (NATO Haze-C)
Search and rescue version with search lights and sliding doors with hoist.
Mi-14PX
Search and rescue training helicopter for the Polish Navy (unofficial designation). One Polish Mi-14PŁ helicopter was temporarily converted into the Mi-14PX, then converted back in 1996.
Mi-14PZh

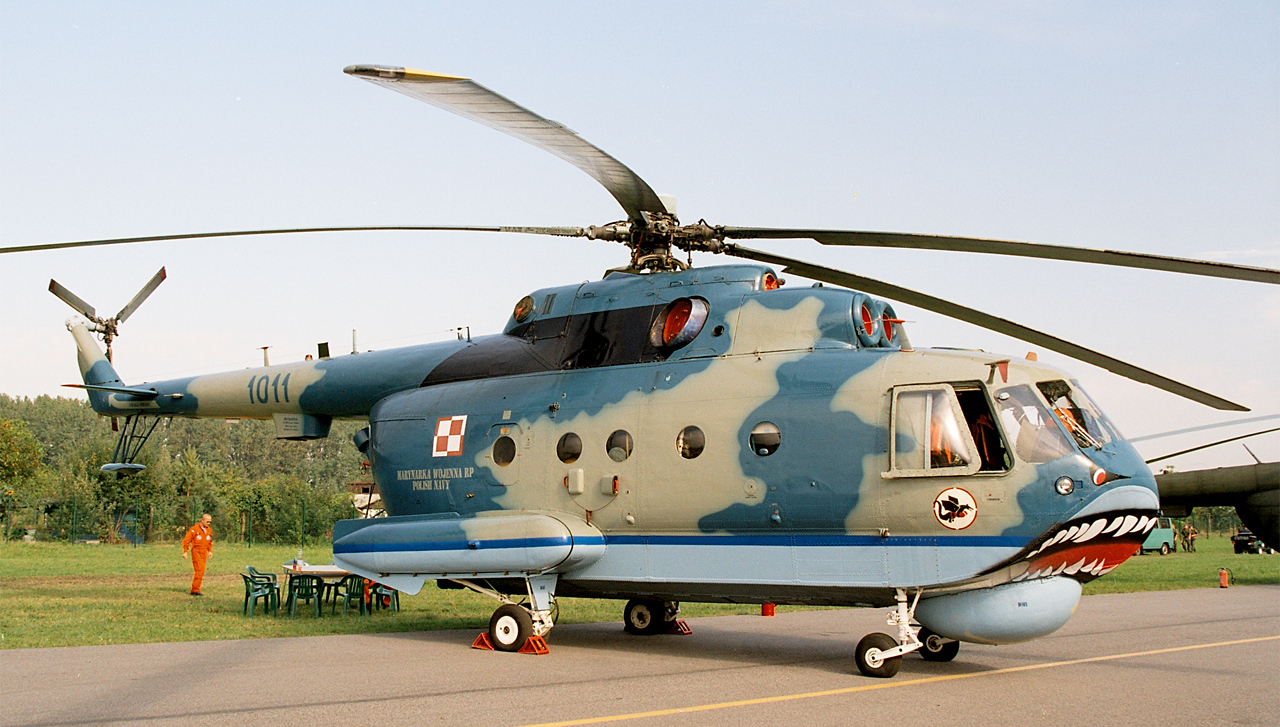
Polish Navy's Mi-14PŁ on display at Radom Air Show 2005

Amphibious firebuster version of Mi-14BT. Conversion price about USD1M.
Mi-14GP
Conversion of Mi-14PL to 24–26 seat civil passenger transport.

== Operational history ==
As part of the Syrian civil war, starting from 2013, Syrian Navy Mi-14 helicopters were used as improvised bombers to drop naval mines and barrel bombs on large area targets from high altitude, mostly cities held by opposing forces. On 22 March 2015, one crashed with its pilot killed on the spot after capture and the rest of the crew captured.

On 7 May 2022, Ukraine confirmed that Colonel Ihor Bedzay, the deputy head of the Ukrainian Navy, was killed when his Mi-14PS was shot down by a Russian Su-35. A video emerged, claimed shot on 7 May 2022, showing a Su-27 family fighter engaging a Mi-14 with its 30 mm gun.

== Operators ==
By 1991, about 230 had been delivered, with exports to many Soviet allies including Bulgaria, Cuba, East Germany, Libya, Poland, and Syria.

=== Current operators ===
Georgia

- Georgian Air Force

Libya

- Libyan Air Force

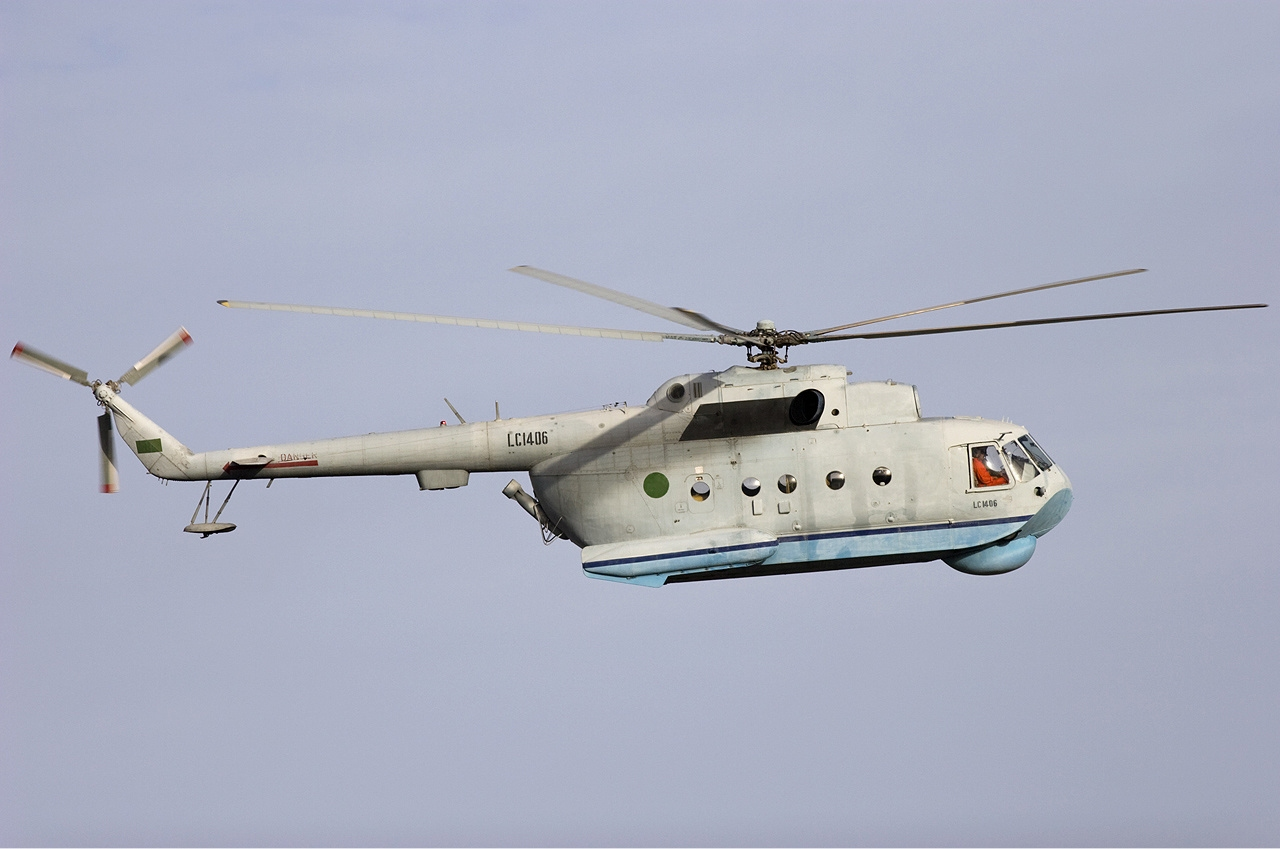
Libyan Air Force Mi-14

Poland

- Polish Navy

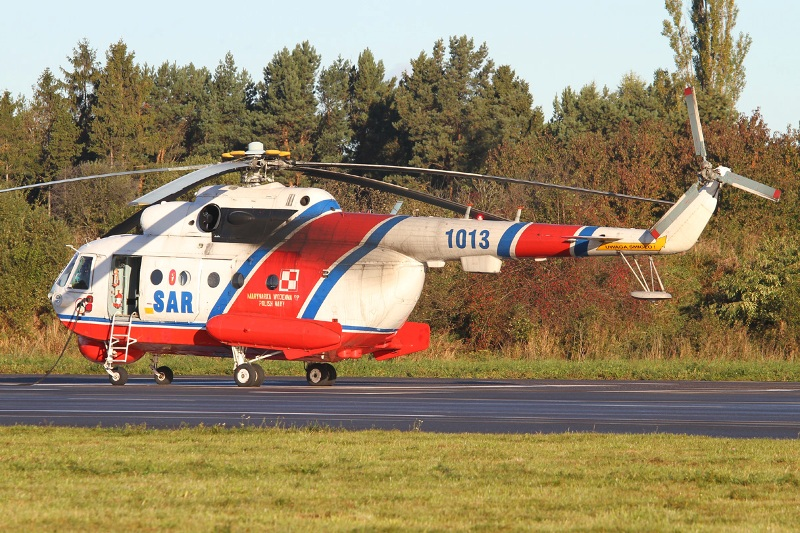
Polish Navy Mi-14PS

Republic of the Congo

- Congolese Navy

Ukraine

- Ukrainian Naval Aviation - operated by 10th Naval Aviation Brigade

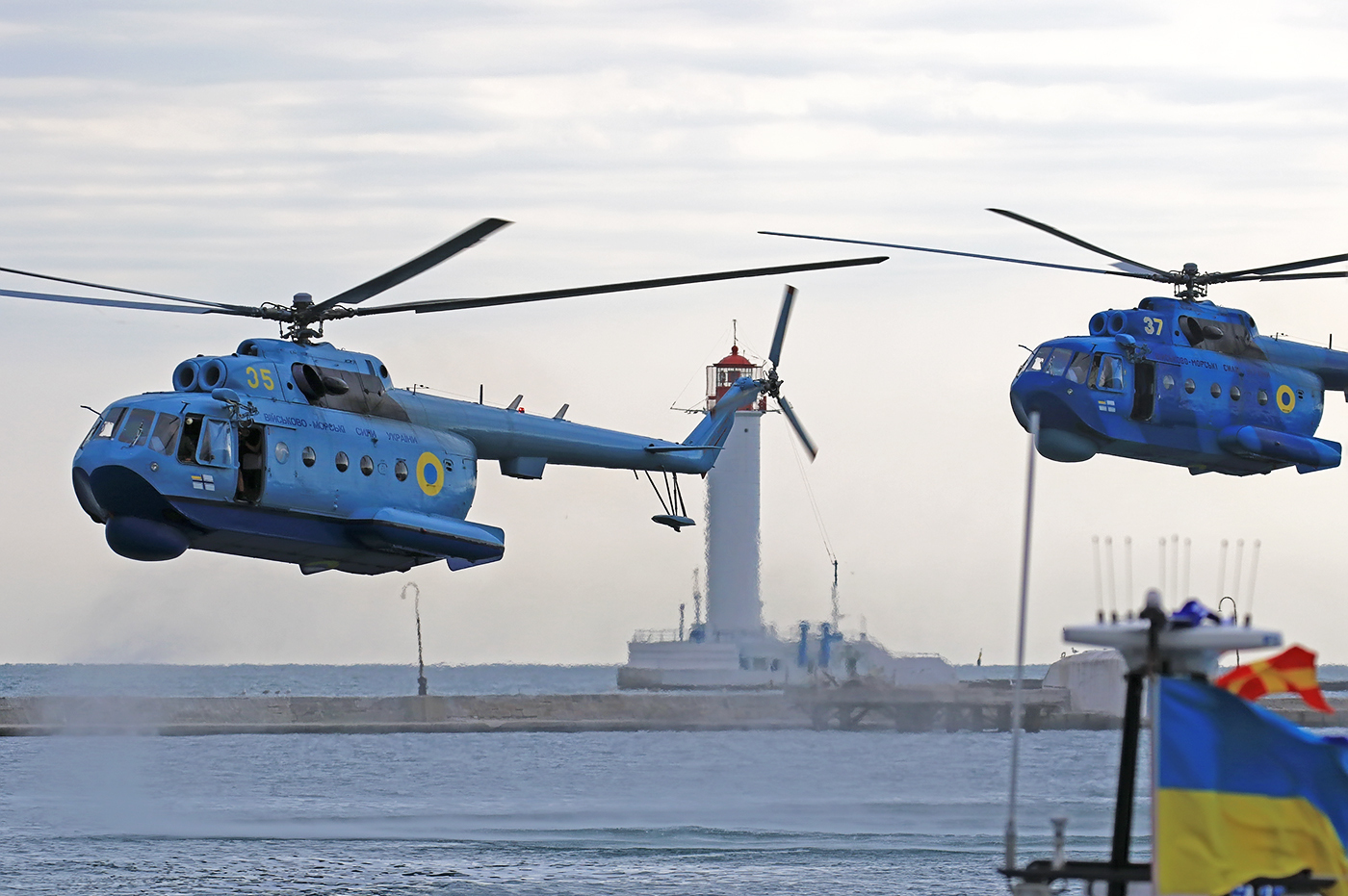
Ukrainian Navy Mi-14PL

Yemen

- Yemen Air Force

=== Former operators ===
Bulgaria

- Bulgarian Navy

Cuba

- Cuban Air Force

East Germany

- East German Navy
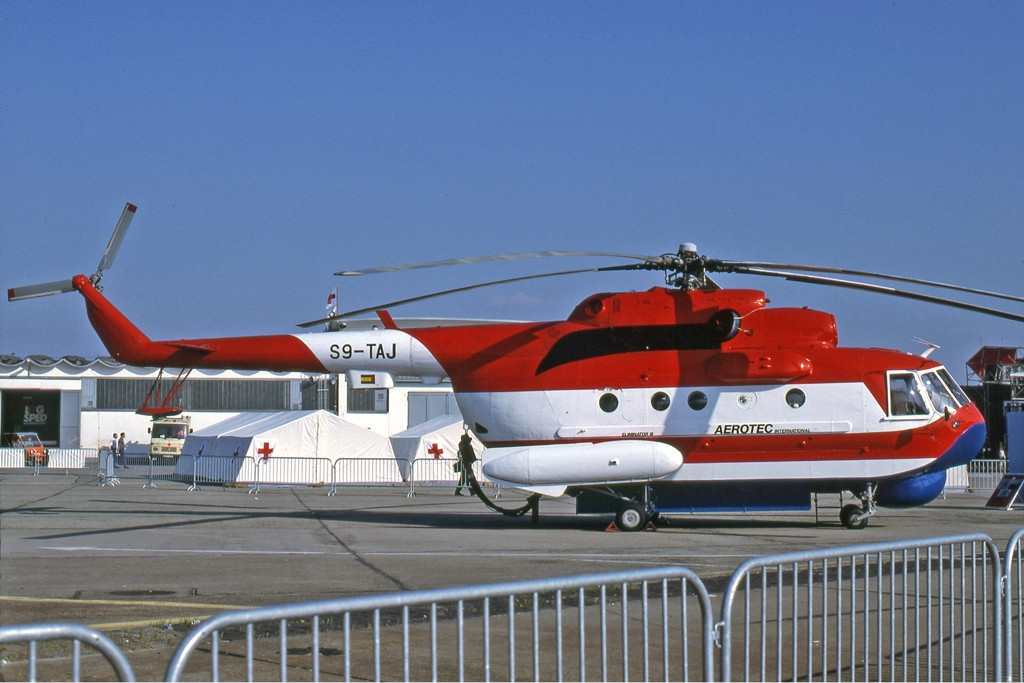
  Mi-14BT at Aerotec International

Ethiopia

- Ethiopian Air Force

Germany

- German Navy

Pakistan

- Pakistan Navy

Russia

- Russian Naval Aviation

South Yemen

- People's Democratic Republic of Yemen Air Force

Soviet Union

- Soviet Naval Aviation

Syria

- Syrian Arab Air Force
- Syrian Navy

The Syrian government of Al-Assad fell to rebels in late 2024, and the Syrian Arab Air Force was dismantled. It was re-established as Syrian Air Force, but the revolution, and the Israeli air strikes that followed it, wrecked havoc in the inventory of the Air Force. In late 2025, the World Air Forces publication by FlightGlobal, which tracks the aircraft inventories of world's air forces and publishes its counts annually, removed all Syrian Air Force's aircraft from their World Air Forces 2026 report. It is thus questionable if the Syrian Air Force has any flying aircraft in their inventory, and in particular, any Mil Mi-14, as of December 2025.

Yugoslavia

- Yugoslav Air Force

=== Possible Operators ===
North Korea

- Korean People's Army Air Force claimed to be an operator by some sources but described as a mistake by others.

== Specifications (Mi-14PL) ==

Data from Jane's All The World's Aircraft 1992–93

General characteristics

- Crew: 4
- Length: 18.38 m (60 ft 4 in)
- Height: 6.93 m (22 ft 9 in)
- Empty weight: 11,750 kg (25,904 lb)
- Max takeoff weight: 14,000 kg (30,865 lb)
- Powerplant: 2 × Klimov TV3-117MT turboshaft engines, 1,454 kW (1,950 hp) each
- Main rotor diameter: 21.29 m (69 ft 10 in)
- Main rotor area: 356 m^{2} (3,830 sq ft)
- Blade section:NACA 23012

Performance

- Maximum speed: 230 km/h (140 mph, 120 kn)
- Ferry range: 1,135 km (705 mi, 613 nmi)
- Endurance: 4 hours with maximum fuel
- Service ceiling: 3,500 m (11,500 ft)

Armament

- torpedoes, bombs or depth charges

== See also ==
Related development

- Mil Mi-8

Aircraft of comparable role, configuration, and era

- Sikorsky S-61R
- Westland Sea King
