= Klimov TV3-117 =

Russian turboshaft aircraft engine

TV3-117
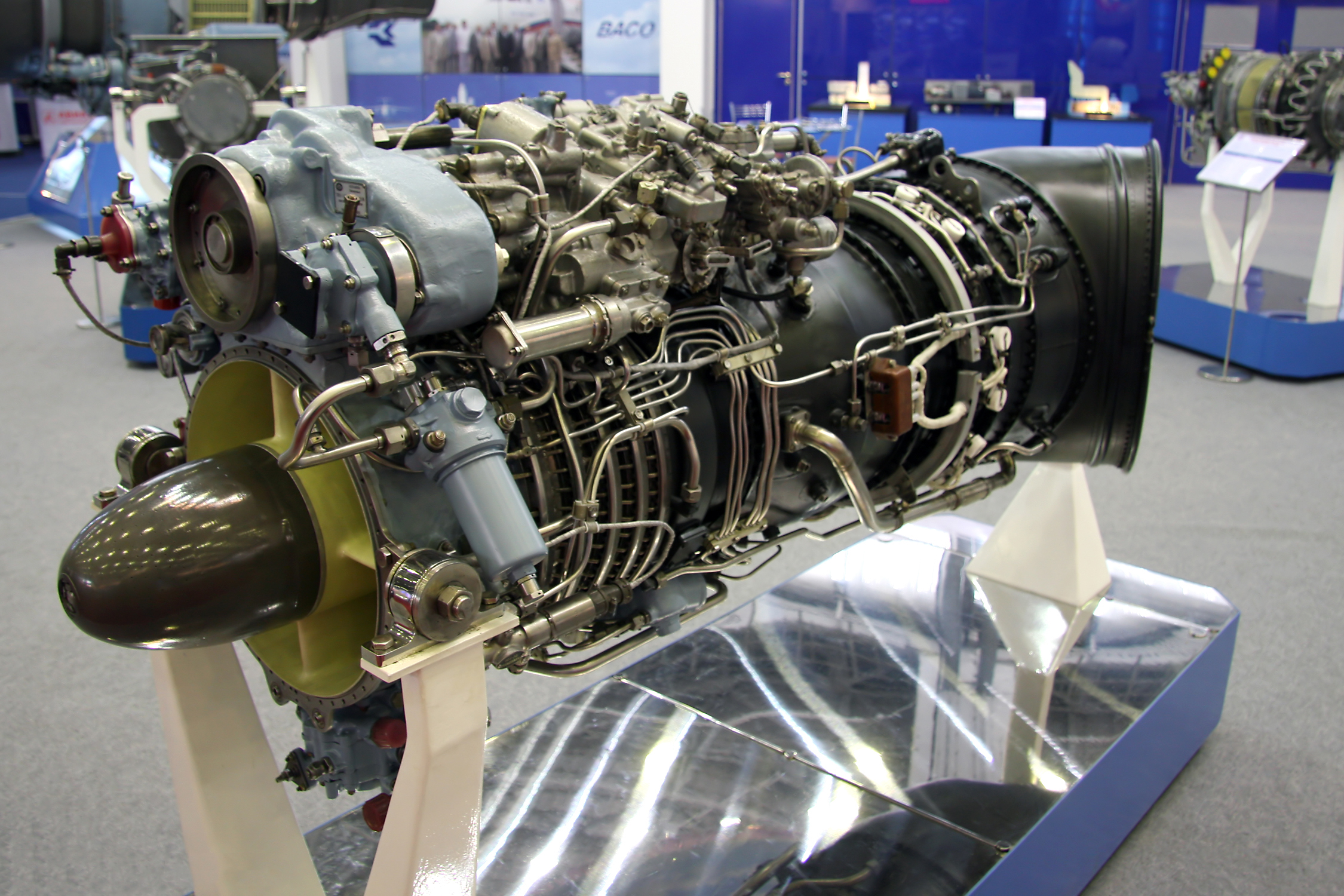
- Type: Turboshaft
- Manufacturer: Original Manufacturer : Klimov Secondary Manufactures : Motor Sich, MMP, Chernyshev, Salyut, UMPO
- First run: 1974
- Major applications: Kamov Ka-27; Mil Mi-8; Mi-24; Mi-28; TAI T929 ATAK 2; TAI T925
- Number built: >25,000
- Developed from: Klimov TV2-117
- Developed into: Klimov VK-2500

The Klimov TV3-117 (Russian: Климов ТВ3-117) is a Soviet gas turbine aero engine. This engine was first made and designed by Klimov, an aerospace manufacturer based in Saint Petersburg Russia. It was developed as an advanced version of the Klimov TV2-117, incorporating significant improvements in performance and reliability. This engine was used in most medium lift, utility, and attack helicopters designed by the Mil and Kamov design bureaus. The TV3-117 turboshaft engine was developed in 1974. Later the Klimov TV3-117 was installed on 95% of all helicopters designed by Mil and Kamov Engineering Centre. The engine has been produced in many variants.

== Variants ==
TV3-117
for Mi-24A (1972)
TV3-117M
("M" stands for "marine") – for Mi-14 helicopters incorporates special features to be used at sea. Mass production started in 1976
TV3-117MT
("MT" stands for "modernized, transport") – for Mi-8MT/Mi-17 helicopters and their variants. Mass production started in 1977
TV3-117KM
("KM" stands for "Kamov, marine") – for Ka-27 helicopters
TV3-117V
("V" stands for "high altitude") – for Mi-24 helicopters operated in the mountains (particularly in Afghanistan). Mass production started in 1980
TV3-117VK
("VK" stands for "high altitude, Kamov") – a model similar to the TV3-117V engine but adapted to Ka-27, Ka-29 and Ka-32 helicopters. Mass production began in 1985. Export helicopter models were equipped with TV3-117VKR engines featuring a higher rated and cruising power ("VKR" stands for "high altitude, Kamov, power"); they were originally designed for Ka-28 machines
TV3-117VM
("VM" stands for "high altitude, modernized") – for Mi-28 helicopters and later installed also on Mi-8MT/Mi-17 models. This engine features an automatic switch to emergency power. It was awarded type certificates by the IAC Aviation Registry, India, the Republic of China and the People's Republic of China. Mass-produced since 1986
TV3-117VMA
("VMA" stands for "high altitude, modernized, model A") – for Ka-50 helicopters. It is currently installed on Ka-27, Ka-29, Ka-31, Mi-24, Mi-28A/N and Ka-32 machines. This engine was awarded type certificates by the IAC Aviation Registry and by Transport Canada. Mass production started in 1986. Export models are equipped with TV3-117VMAR engines (the extra "R" stands for "power") whose rated power and cruising power are similar to those of the TV3-117VKR engine
TV3-117VM Series 02
– a version of TV3-117VM for Mi-8MT/Mi-17 civil helicopters. Type certificates for this engine were awarded by the IAC Aviation Register, India, the Republic of China and the People's Republic of China. Mass production started in 1993
TV3-117VMA series 02
– a version of TV3-117VMA for Ka-32 civil helicopters. Type certificates for this engine were awarded by the IAC Aviation Register, Transport Canada and Switzerland. Mass production started in 1993
TV3-117VMA-SBM1
a 2,000 shp (1,500 kW) Turboprop version for An-140 aircraft produced by the Antonov Company
VK-2500
highly modified TV3-117 with 2,700 shp (2,000 kW) also for hot and high.

== Applications ==
- Antonov An-140
- Kamov Ka-27
- Kamov Ka-29
- Kamov Ka-32
- Kamov Ka-50
- Mil Mi-8
- Mil Mi-14
- Mil Mi-17
- Mil Mi-24
- Mil Mi-28
- Mil Mi-35
- HESA Simourgh

== Specifications (TV3-117VMA Series 2) ==
Data from Brassey's World Aircraft & Systems Directory 1999/2000

==== General characteristics ====
- Type: Free-turbine turboshaft
- Length: 2,055 mm (80.9 in)
- Diameter: 728 mm (28.7 in) (height)
- Dry weight: 295 kg (648 lb)

==== Components ====
- Compressor: 12-stage axial HP
- Turbine: two-stage HP, two-stage LP
- Fuel type: Jet fuel

==== Performance ====
- Maximum power output: 1,640 kW (2,200 shp) (take-off)
- Overall pressure ratio: 9.4:1
- Air mass flow: 8.7 kg/s (19 lb/s) minimum
- Turbine inlet temperature: 920–990 C (Turbine entry temperature)
- Specific fuel consumption: 0.308 kg/kW/h (0.507 lb/shp/hr)
- Power-to-weight ratio: 5.58 kW/kg

== See also ==
Comparable engines

- Klimov TV2-117

Related lists

- List of aircraft engines
