= Klimov TV2-117 =

1960s Soviet turboshaft aircraft engine

TV2-117
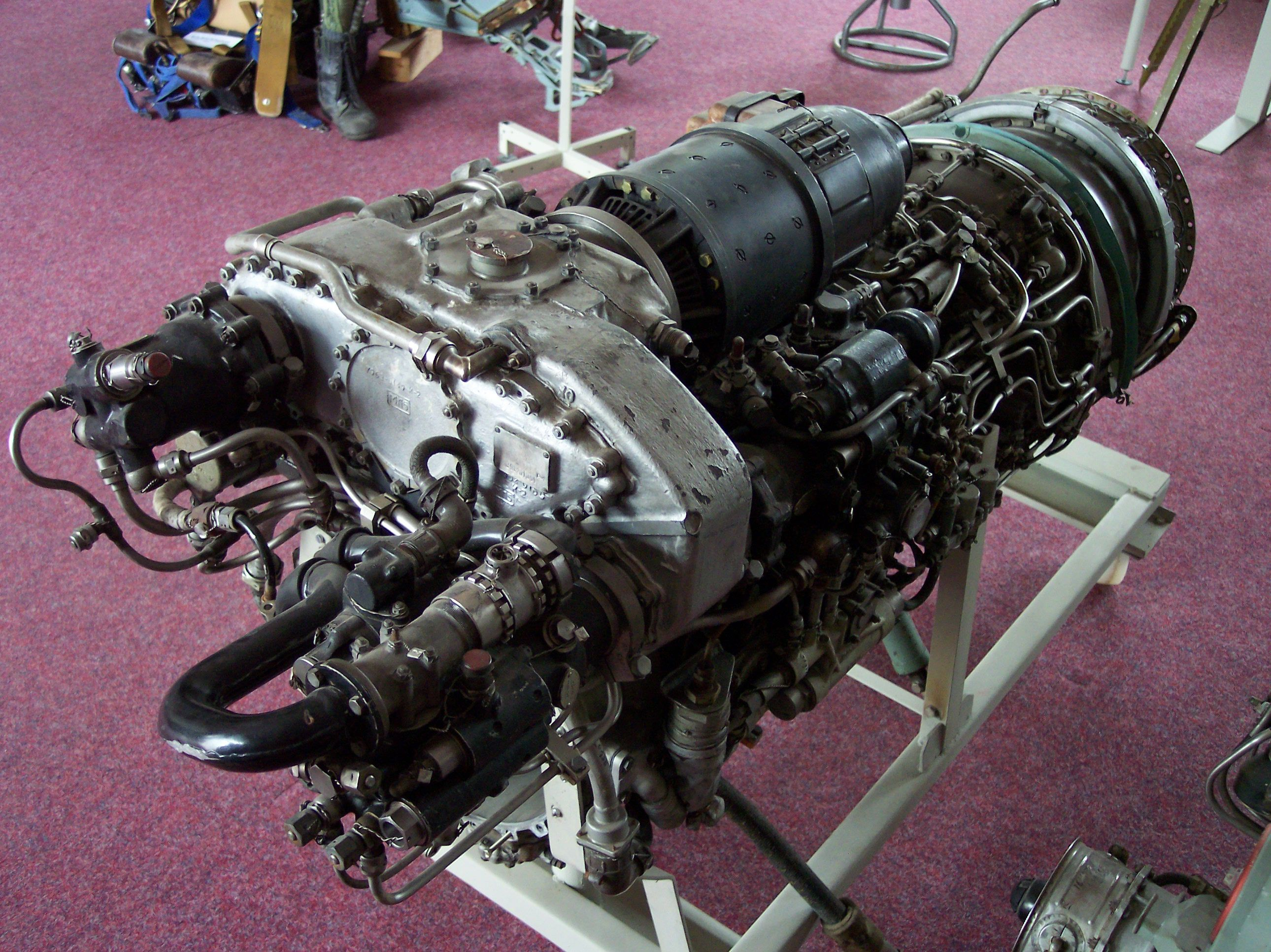
- Type: Turboshaft
- Manufacturer: Klimov
- First run: 1962
- Major applications: Mil Mi-8
- Number built: 23,000
- Developed into: Klimov TV3-117

The Klimov TV2-117 (initially Isotov TV2-117) is a Soviet gas-turbine turboshaft engine intended for helicopter use. Designed in the early 1960s by the Isotov Design Bureau the engine became the first purpose built gas turbine engine for helicopter use by the Soviet Union with previous helicopter turbines being adapted aeroplane powerplants. It was later produced by Klimov, production ending in 1997.

The TV2-117 is claimed to be the most popular helicopter powerplant worldwide and has accumulated over 100 million hours in service.

== Variants ==
Source:Klimov.

TV2-117
Base variant.

TV2-117A
Improved engine with more durable compressor stator blades.

TV2-117AG
Carbon sealed shaft bearings

TV2-117F
Limited production of engine certified to FAA airworthiness standards for Japan.

TV2-117TG
Multi-fuel variant, adapted to run on liquid petroleum gas and other fuels (gasoline or diesel fuel) and for use in cold climates.

== Applications ==
- Antonov An-24 (intended coupled turboprop application)
- Mil Mi-8
- Mil Mi-14

== Specifications (TV2-117A) ==
Data from World Encyclopaedia of Aero Engines, World Encyclopaedia of Aero Engines, Aircraft engines of the World 1970

==== General characteristics ====
- Type: Turboshaft
- Length: 2,390 mm (94 in)
- Diameter: 400 mm (16 in)
- Frontal area: 0.12 m^{2} (1.3 sq ft)
- Dry weight: 330 kg (730 lb) (minus accessories)

==== Components ====
- Compressor: Ten-stage axial flow
- Combustors: Eight-chamber cannular
- Turbine: Two-stage compressor turbine, two-stage power turbine
- Fuel type: Aviation Kerosene such as JP-4
- Oil system: Pressure spray at 50 psi (3.4 bar) with return

==== Performance ====
- Maximum power output:

- Take-off power: 1,500 shp (1,100 kW) at 12,000 rpm (power turbine) de-rated
- Altitude power: 1,300 kW (1,800 hp) at 12,000 rpm (power turbine) at 1,200 m (3,900 ft)

- Overall pressure ratio: 6.6:1 at 21,200 rpm
- Air mass flow: 8.1 kg/s (1,070 lb/min)
- Turbine inlet temperature: TIT 1,150 K (880 °C)
- Specific fuel consumption: 0.606 lb/(hp⋅h) (0.369 kg/kWh)
- Power-to-weight ratio: 2.06 hp/lb (3.39 kW/kg)

== See also ==
Comparable engines

- Rolls-Royce Gnome

Related lists

- List of aircraft engines
