= 10th Naval Aviation Brigade =

- 10-та морська авіаційна бригада
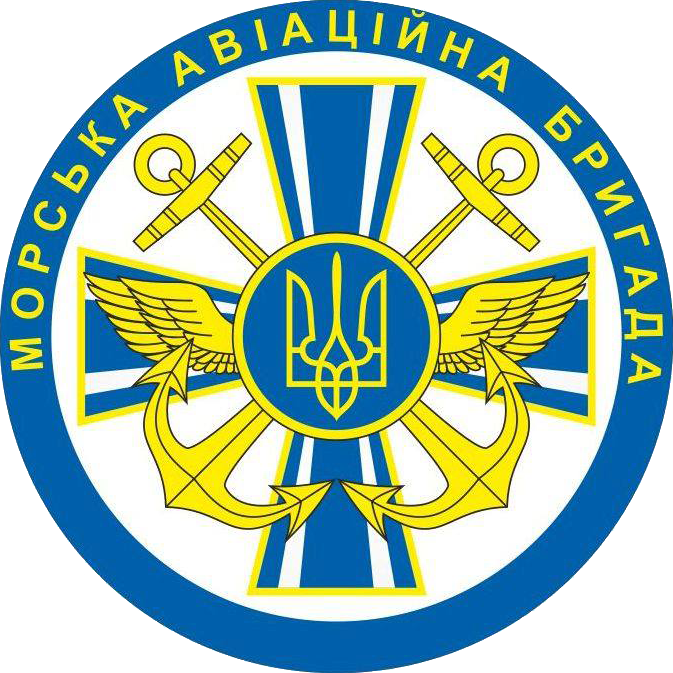
- Brigade Insignia
- Active: 2004 - present
- Country: Ukraine
- Branch: Ukrainian Navy
- Type: Brigade
- Role: Naval Aviation
- Part of: Ukrainian Naval Aviation
- Garrison/HQ: Mykolaiv
- Nickname: Colonel Ihor Volodymyrovych Bedzai Brigade
- Engagements: Operation Atalanta; Operation Ocean Shield; Russo-Ukrainian War: Annexation of Crimea by the Russian Federation; Russian invasion of Ukraine
- Decorations: For Courage and Bravery

Commanders
- Notable commanders: Colonel Ihor Volodymyrovych Bedzai

Aircraft flown
- See #Aircraft Operated

The 10th Naval Aviation Brigade (also called the Colonel Ihor Volodymyrovych Bedzai brigade) is the sole Brigade of the Ukrainian Naval Aviation established in 2004 by the merger of 9th Mixed Marine Aircraft Squadron, 316th Separate Marine Aviation Squadron and the 555th Naval Helicopter Regiment. It operates a small number of fixed-wing, rotatory and unmanned aircraft. It was previously garrisoned at Novofedorivka but is currently based at Mykolaiv.

== History ==
=== Collapse of the USSR and establishment ===
Following the collapse of the Soviet Union in 1991, a large number of aircraft were stationed in Ukraine and taken over by the newly formed Ukrainian government. According to the International Institute for Strategic Studies (IISS), the Ukrainian Army Aviation had 7 regiments with a total of 7,000 personnel in 1994. In order to pay its debts, and to comply with the terms of the Treaty on Conventional Armed Forces in Europe, Ukraine began the process of restructuring its armed forces, selling some of its aircraft or returning them to Russia, and reducing the size of the Ukrainian Armed Forces by nearly two-thirds between 2002 and 2010.

The unit was established in 2004 from the merger of the 9th Mixed Marine Aircraft Squadron, 316th Separate Marine Aviation Squadron, and the 555th Naval Helicopter Regiment of the Ukrainian Navy with the last commander of the 555th regiment, Yuriy Moskalyov becoming the brigade's first commander. On 14 October 2008, the brigade was assigned the name Saka, to its place of deployment.

In 2010, the 10th Brigade had 2,500 personnel and most of its fixed-wing aircraft were transferred to the Ukrainian Air Force, other than some Antonov transports and ten Beriev Be-12 flying boats. It also had twenty-eight Kamov Ka-25, two Ka-27E, forty-two Mil Mi-14PL, and five Mil Mi-6 helicopters.

Ukraine's naval units, accompanied by the brigade's aircraft participated in several deployments such as Operation Atalanta and Operation Ocean Shield.

=== Russian annexation of Crimea and War in Donbas ===
In March 2014, during the Russian invasion of Crimea, the battalion's aircraft stationed at Novofedorivka carrying personnel in radio silence mode, risking getting lost and without warning the higher command, evacuated to the mainland to the Kulbakino Air Base, leaving behind only ground vehicles.

On 3 March 2014, the evacuation started as the helicopters of the brigade took off without taxiing onto the runway, straight from the hangars followed by aircraft. In just eighteen minutes, four planes and five helicopters were evacuated to the mainland. After five days, a pilot of the 10th Naval Aviation Brigade in civilian clothes evacuated another helicopter assigned to Ukrainian frigate Hetman Sahaidachny and took it to mainland. The brigade became the first unit to evacuate all of its combat equipment completely from Crimea.

In April 2014, an incident took place outside the Novofedorivka Air Base in the military dormitory building, which was occupied by Ukrainian servicemen and their families that were awaiting relocation to mainland Ukraine. While Major Stansilav Karachevsky, the head of Operational HQ of the 10th Naval Aviation Brigade was preparing his belongings in preparation to leave Crimea, an altercation between him and several soldiers on both sides broke out.

The scuffle escalated to where Russian spetsnaz sergeant E.S. Zaitsev shot the unarmed officer twice in the head at point-blank range with an AK-74 assault rifle on the 5th floor of the dormitory building where Russian soldiers were evacuating the troops. Major Karachevsky was pronounced dead immediately. A second Ukrainian personnel, identified as Captain Artem Yermolenko, was beaten and abducted by Russian soldiers. Russian sources confirmed the death of a Ukrainian major perpetrated by one of its sergeants. After the incident, the major's body was reportedly taken by Russian troops. Zaytsev was convicted by a Russian military court for murder and sentenced to two years imprisonment.

In September 2014, the brigade took part in the military Exercise Sea Breeze 2014.

In July 2016, the brigade took part in the international military exercise "Sea Breeze 2016".

On 16 March 2017, the brigade received a Mi-14PL helicopter after its restoration at the Aviakon Aircraft Reparation Plant, and another Mi-14PL was handed over after restoration on 2 July 2017.

In January 2018, a serviceman of the brigade (Vasiliev Vadim Oleksandrovych) was killed under undisclosed circumstances while fighting the separatists. On 8 June 2018, the brigade received a Ka-226 helicopter adapted for military medical purposes.

In 2019, the Ukrainian Navy received its first six Bayraktar TB2 drones from Turkey. In August and October 2019, the brigade received two Mi-8 MSB-V helicopters, modernized by Motor Sich JSC. On 31 October 2019, Yehor Shishkin, a businessman from Mykolaiv, presented his personal An-2 aircraft to the Ukrainian Navy and it was inducted into the 10th Naval Aviation Brigade after a ceremony.

In January 2020, the brigade received an An-2 aircraft that had been confiscated from smugglers. In late 2020, the brigade received a new modernized Mil Mi-2MSB helicopter.

On 25 November 2021, the brigade received two more modernized Mi-8MSB-V helicopters.

=== Russian invasion of Ukraine ===
In early January 2022, the brigade received a new training building equipped with flying simulators, workplaces for personnel training, interactive whiteboards, and a gym with modern sports equipment.

Prior to the Russian invasion of Ukraine on 24 February 2022, the 10th Naval Aviation Brigade now reduced to 10 Mi-8MSB-V, Ka-27, Ka-226, and Mi-14 helicopters, 2 An-2 fixed-wing aircraft, 6 TB2 drones, and 1,000 personnel, was pre-deployed to reserve airfields and airstrips to prevent missile attacks and prevent equipment losses.

In March 2022, a TB2 drone of the brigade reportedly distracted the air defense of the Russian cruiser Moskva giving enough time window for it to be hit by a R-360 Neptune anti-ship missile.

On 2 May 2022, a TB2 drone of the brigade destroyed two Russian Raptor-class patrol boats.

On 7 May 2022, during the Snake Island campaign, a Mi-14 helicopter of the brigade flown by the commander of Ukrainian Naval Aviation, Ihor Bedzai was attacked by a Russian Su-30. The helicopter successfully evaded gunfire, but was hit by a R-73 air-to-air missile, killing Bedzai along with four other personnel (Mykhailo Ihorovych Zaremba, Serhii Mykolayovych Mushchytskyi, Yuriy Pirog, and Ilchuk Vasyl Vasyliovych) on board. On 24 June 2022, the 10th Naval Aviation Brigade was given the honorary name of Colonel Ihor Bedzai.

In the coming days, a Russian amphibious assault ship and two anti-aircraft missile systems "Tor" near Snake Island were hit by the brigade's TB2 drones. On 8 May 2022, a TB2 drone of the brigade destroyed a Mi-8 helicopter during an attempted landing on Snake Island.

In November 2022, in response to the Russian invasion the United Kingdom announced they were donating three former Royal Navy Westland Sea Kings to the Ukrainian Navy, which were inducted into the brigade. On 2 July 2023, the brigade was awarded the honorary award "For Courage and Bravery".

== Structure ==
=== Current ===
- Management and Headquarters: Kulbakine Air Base, Mykolaiv
- Fixed Wing Squadron (most aircraft are in storage or non-operational)
- Helicopter Squadron
- UAV Squadron
- Radio, Communication and Technical Support Battalion
- Maintenance Battalion
- Technical and Operational Aircraft equipment Battalion
- Technical and Operational Automobile equipment Battalion
- Material support Company
- Rescue Paratroopers group
- Meteorological group
- Engineering Service
- Guardian Platoon

== Commanders ==
- Colonel Yuriy Volodymyrovych Moskaliov (2004–2006)
- Colonel Volodymyr Volodymyrovych Khomenko (2006–2013)
- Colonel Ihor Volodymyrovych Bedzai (2013–2019)
- Colonel Ilya Mykolayovych Oleinikov (2019–)

== Inventory ==
=== Current ===
Aircraft	Origin	Type	Notes
Fixed Wing Aircraft
An-26	Soviet Union	Transport	In storage.
Be-12	Soviet Union	Patrol / anti-submarine	Non-operational.
An-2	Soviet Union	Transport	
Helicopters
Ka-226	Russia	Ambulance	
Ka-27	Soviet Union	Anti-submarine	
Mil Mi-14	Soviet Union	Anti-submarine / search and rescue	
Mi-8MSB-V	Soviet Union / Ukraine	Utility	
Westland Sea King	United Kingdom	Search and rescue / transport / utility	
Unmanned aerial vehicles
Bayraktar TB2	Turkey	Unmanned combat aerial vehicle	

=== Retired ===
Aircraft previously operated by the 10th Naval Aviation Brigade include: Antonov An-12, Antonov An-24, Antonov An-26, Ilyushin Il-18, Tupolev Tu-134, Kamov Ka-25, Kamov Ka-29, and Mil Mi-6.
