= Klimov VK-2500 =

1990s Soviet and later Russian turboshaft aircraft engine

VK-2500
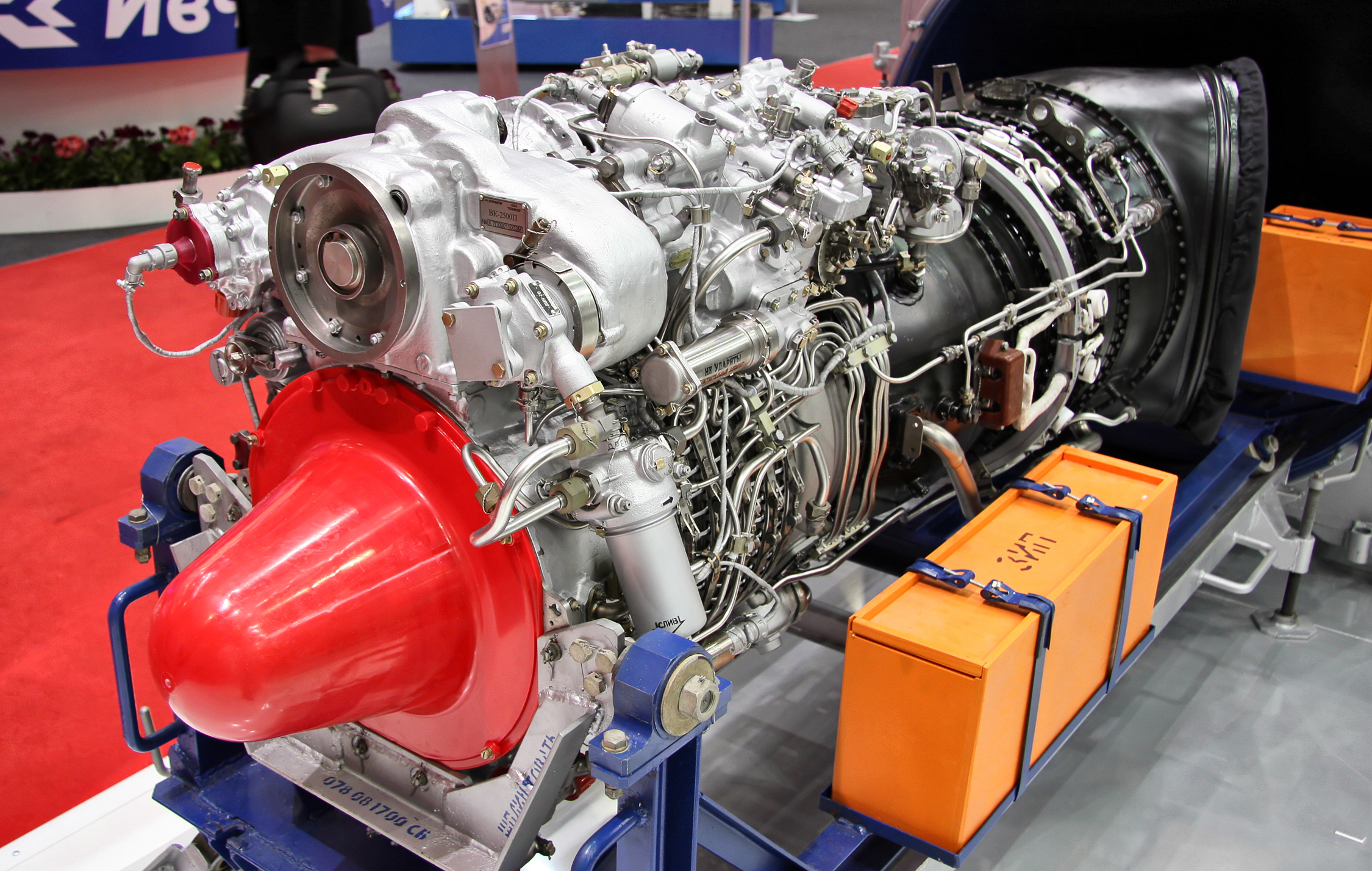
- Type: Turboshaft
- National origin: Russia
- Manufacturer: Klimov
- Major applications: Kamov Ka-50; Kamov Ka-52; Mil Mi-28
- Developed from: Klimov TV3-117

The Klimov VK-2500 (Russian: Климов ВК-2500) is a Russian turboshaft aero engine. It is a high power derivative of the TV3-117VMA engine designed for hot and high performance.

== Design ==
It differs from the older versions in having an extended overhaul period of the engine hot components, extra gas-dynamic stability at varying duties, engine parameters accuracy and engine control quality, enhanced monitoring depth providing operation of the engine according to its technical condition and better weight characteristics and overall dimensions.

== Variants ==
VK-2500-01
Has a 1,500 shp (1,119 kW) maximum continuous performance and a 2,000 shp (1,491 kW) take-off performance. Powers Ka-52.
VK-2500-02
Has a 1,500 shp (1,119 kW) maximum continuous performance and a 2,200 shp (1,641 kW) take-off performance. Used by Ka-32, and Mi-35M, Mi-28N, Mi-28NE and Mi-28UB attack helicopters.
VK-2500-03
Has 1,750 shp (1,305 kW) maximum continuous performance and a 2,400 shp (1,790 kW) take-off performance. Used by Mi-8AMTSh-V/VA and Mi-171Sh transport helicopters.
VK-2500P-01
Equipped with revised FADEC. Rated at 2,500 shp (1,864 kW) take-off power. Powers Mi-28NM.
VK-2500M
Next generation derivative of VK-2500 under development by Klimov, with planned reduced fuel burn and weight. Rated at 2,600 shp (1,939 kW) for take-off and 2,200 shp (1,641 kW) continuous power. Deliveries planned by 2023.
TV3-117VMA-SB3
Ukrainian designation for VK-2500.

== Applications ==
- Kamov Ka-50
- Kamov Ka-52
- Mil Mi-28
- Mi-8AMTSh
- Mi-17V-7
- Mi-171A2
- Mi-171E

== Specifications ==
Data from Motor Sich Klimov

==== General characteristics ====
- Type: Turboshaft
- Length: 2,055 mm (80.9 in)
- Diameter: width=660 mm (26 in) height=728 mm (28.7 in)
- Dry weight: 300 kg (660 lb)

==== Components ====
- Compressor: Axial compressor

==== Performance ====
- Maximum power output: 1,985 kW (2,699 hp)
- Specific fuel consumption: 0.21-0.22 kg/hp/hr, 0.286-0.299 kg/kW/hr
- Power-to-weight ratio: 6.62 kW/kg; 8.87 shp/kg; 4.02 shp/lb

== See also ==
Related lists

- List of aircraft engines
