= Oktyabrskoye air base =

Active Russian Air Force base in Crimea

Oktyabrskoye (Oktiabrske)
- Oktiabrske, Hvardiiske, Crimea in Ukraine
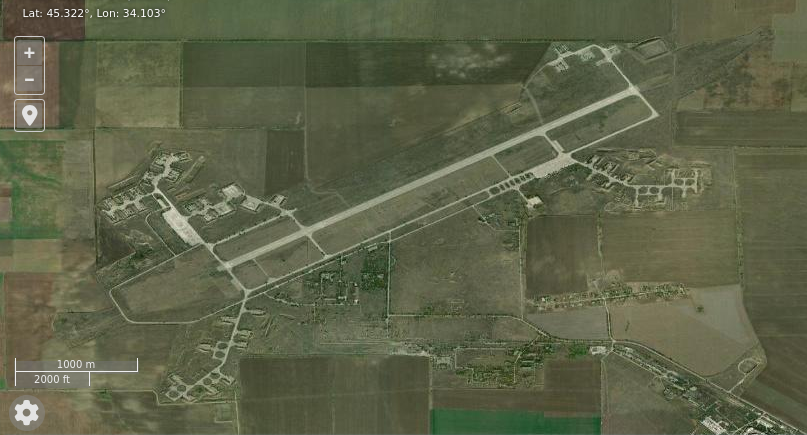
- Satellite imagery of Oktyabrskoye air base

Site information
- Type: Air Base
- Operator: Russian Air Force; Russian Ground Forces

Location
- Shown within Crimea
- Coordinates: 45°19′18″N 34°06′11″E

Site history
- In use: -present

Airfield information
- Elevation: 1 metre (3 ft 3 in) AMSL
Runways
Direction	Length and surface
06/24	3,250 metres (10,663 ft) Concrete

Oktyabrskoye is an airbase in Crimea used by the Russian Air Force located 15 miles (24 km) east of Hvardiiske, Simferopol Raion, Crimea.

== History ==
In 1958, the Soviet Union 639th Fighter Aviation Regiment of the 49th Fighter Aviation Division, Black Sea Fleet, was redeployed to the Oktyabrskoye airfield from Khersones. The regiment was armed with Mikoyan-Gurevich MiG-17 (ASCC "Fresco") fighters. On April 6, 1960, by a directive of the USSR Ministry of Defense dated March 16, 1960, as part of the "further significant reduction in the Armed Forces of the USSR," the headquarters of the 49th Fighter Aviation Division at the Belbek Air Base airfield was disbanded. At the same time, the regiment was disbanded.

The base was previously home to the 943rd Konstantskiy Red Banner Maritime Missile Aviation Regiment of the Black Sea Fleet.

The base was used by the Ukrainian Air Force before it was abandoned. After occupation by Russia during the Russo-Ukrainian War in 2014, the airbase was restored by the Russian Air Force during 2020 to serve as a reserve base. During February 2022 military units were observed using the southern portion of the base.

== See also ==
- List of military airbases in Russia
