= Ihor Bedzai =

Ukrainian naval officer (1972–2022)

Hero of Ukraine Ihor Bedzai
- Born: 20 July 1972; Mykolaiv, Ukrainian SSR, Soviet Union
- Died: 7 May 2022 †(aged 49); Odesa Oblast, Ukraine
- Military career
- Allegiance: Ukraine
- Branch: Ukrainian Naval Aviation
- Service years: 1993–2022
- Rank: Colonel
- Commands: Commander of the 10th Naval Aviation Brigade; Commander of the Ukrainian Naval Aviation; Deputy Commander of the Ukrainian Navy
- Conflicts: Russo-Ukrainian war
- Awards: Hero of Ukraine; Order of Bohdan Khmelnytsky III class

Ihor Volodymyrovych Bedzai (Ukrainian: Ігор Володимирович Бедзай; 20 July 1972 – 7 May 2022) was a Ukrainian naval officer and pilot killed when his helicopter was shot down by Russian forces during the Russo-Ukrainian war. He was also the Deputy Commander of the Ukrainian Navy. He was a posthumously awarded the title of Hero of Ukraine as a recipient of the Order of the Gold Star, and the knight of the Order of Bohdan Khmelnytsky III class.

== Early life ==
Bedzai was born on 20 July 1972 in the city of Mykolaiv, which was then part of the Ukrainian SSR in the Soviet Union. His father was a railway driver. His wife attributed his desire to enter the military to one of his primary school teachers having a son who was an aviator who graduated from Syzran Military Aviation School. After this, it was reported that Bedzai dreamed of flying fighter jets and becoming a military pilot. After graduation, he attempted to enter the Soviet Air Forces, but due to a medical examination, it was deemed that he could only fly helicopters. In 1989, he decided to enter the Syzran Higher Military Aviation School in the Russian SSR. He graduated in 1993 with the specialty of a pilot-engineer.

== Military career ==
After graduation, he chose to serve with the Ukrainian Navy, and was assigned to the 555th Anti-Submarine Mixed Aviation Regiment, which was based in Ochakiv. He was later transferred in 2004 to Novofedorivka, Crimea, where the 10th Naval Aviation Brigade was based. In Novofedorivka, he initially served as the commander of a helicopter detachment before he was later promoted to squadron commander. In early March 2014, the brigade commander, Volodymyr Khomenko, fell ill and died. After this, Bedzai was chosen to replace him. After the start of the Russian occupation of Crimea, he led the battalion in transferring equipment that had been evacuated from the Saky air base to Mykolaiv Oblast in mainland Ukraine. The 10th Naval Aviation Brigade was the only unit of the Armed Forces of Ukraine that was stationed in Crimea that had managed to withdraw its military equipment. After Bedzai's relocation to Mykolaiv, he was appointed a brigade commander. As a commander, he participated in the Anti-terrorist Operation Zone during the War in Donbas, helping to deliver personnel and cargo. He also participated in the operation Exercise Sea Breeze in the autumn of 2014. In 2019, he was appointed Deputy Commander of the Ukrainian Navy for Aviation and was therefore relocated to Odesa.

== Commemoration ==
On 24 June 2022, in accordance with the Decree of the President of Ukraine, in order to perpetuate the memory of Hero of Ukraine Colonel Ihor Bedzai, the 10th Naval Aviation Brigade of the Naval Forces of the Armed Forces of Ukraine, the brigade was named after the Bedzai, and in the future the brigade became known as the "10th Marine Aviation Brigade named after the Hero of Ukraine, Colonel Ihor Bedzai of the Naval Forces of the Armed Forces of Ukraine".

== Awards ==
- National Legend of Ukraine (August 20, 2022, posthumously)
- Hero of Ukraine with the Order of the Golden Star (May 11, 2022, posthumously)
- Order of Bohdan Khmelnytsky 3d class (August 21, 2014)
- Medal For Military Service to Ukraine (February 19, 2004)
- Medal "For Irreproachable Service" 3d class (July 1, 2011)

== Sources ==
- Указ Президента
- Діордієв, В. Останній політ, або Земля та небо полковника Бедзая // АрміяInform. — 2022. — 4 серпня.
- Вони зберегли честь Військово-Морських сил України і вберегли Україну від вторгнення на східних кордонах
- На Sea Breeze-2014 відпрацьовано епізод з протичовнового забезпечення кораблів
