= Russian patrol ship Ruslan =

Ivan Susanin-class icebreaking patrol ship

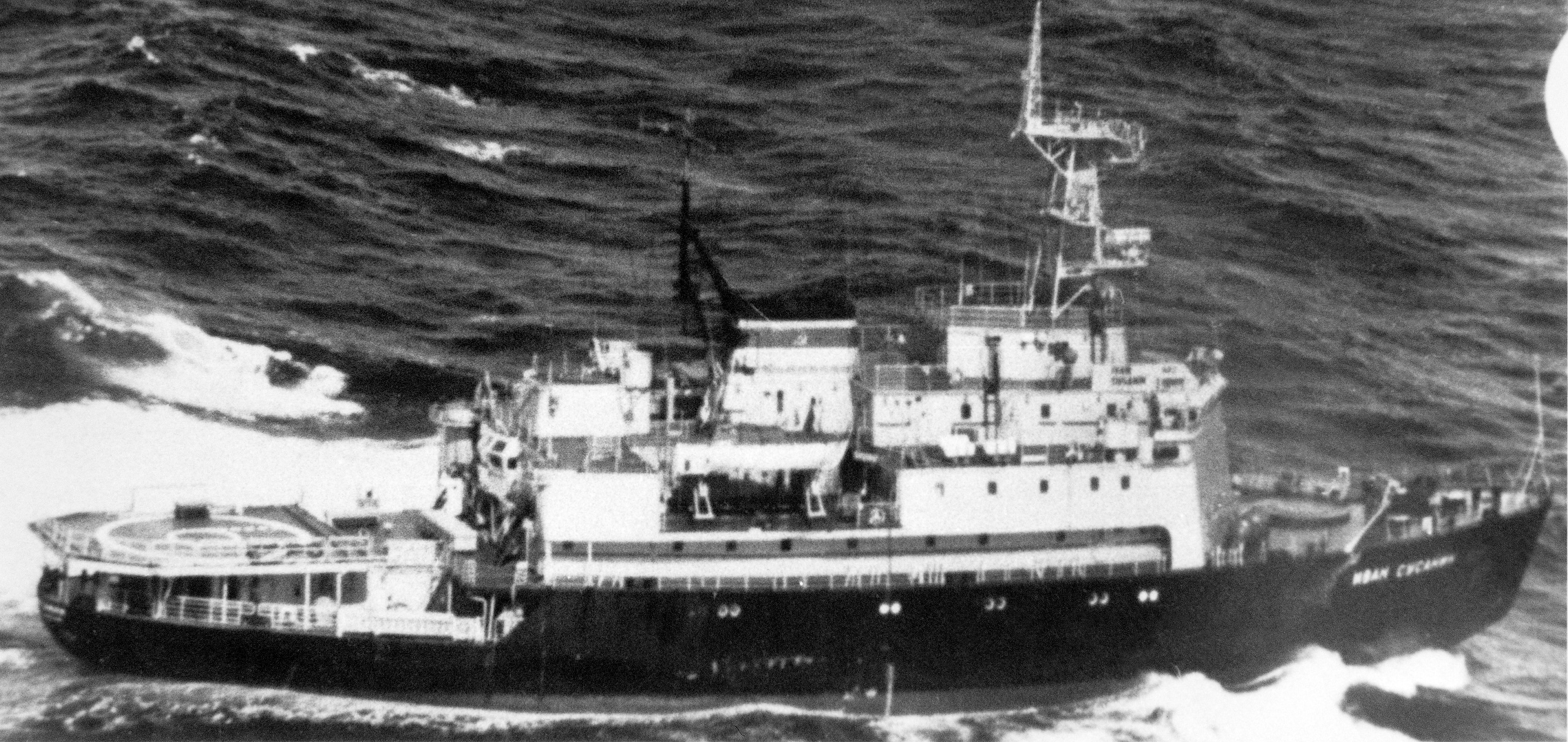
- Ruslan's sister ship Ivan Susanin photographed on 1 May 1985

History

→ Soviet Union → Russia
- Name: Ruslan (Руслан)
- Namesake: Ruslan from Ruslan and Ludmila
- Operator: Northern Fleet
- Builder: Admiralty Shipyard (Leningrad, USSR)
- Yard number: 02652
- Laid down: 26 December 1973
- Launched: 28 May 1974
- Completed: 26 September 1975
- In service: 1975–present
- Status: In service

General characteristics
- Class & type: Ivan Susanin-class patrol ship
- Displacement: 3,710 t (3,650 long tons) (full load)
- Length: 70 m (230 ft)
- Beam: 18.1 m (59 ft)
- Draught: 6.5 m (21 ft)
- Installed power: 3 × 13D100 (3 × 1,800 hp)
- Propulsion: Diesel–electric; two shafts (2 × 2,400 hp)
- Speed: 15.4 knots (28.5 km/h; 17.7 mph)
- Range: 10,700 nautical miles (19,800 km; 12,300 mi) at 12.5 knots (23.2 km/h; 14.4 mph)
- Endurance: 50 days
- Complement: 10 officers; 113 crew
- Sensors & processing systems: MR-302 Rubka ("Strut Curve") surface and air-search radar; MR-105 Turel ("Hawk Screech") fire-control radar
- Armament: 1 × twin 76 mm AK-726; 2 × 30 mm AK-630
- Aviation facilities: Helideck for Kamov Ka-25 or Ka-27
- Notes: Armament removed

Ruslan (Russian: Руслан) is a Soviet and later Russian Navy icebreaking patrol ship. It is one of eight Project 97P patrol ships built by Admiralty Shipyard in Leningrad in 1973–1981.

== Description ==
In the mid-1950s, the Soviet Union began developing a new diesel-electric icebreaker design based on the 1942-built steam-powered icebreaker Eisbär to meet the needs of both civilian and naval operators. Built in various configurations until the early 1980s, the Project 97 icebreakers and their derivatives became the largest and longest-running class of icebreakers and icebreaking vessels built in the world.

The patrol ship variant, Project 97P (Russian: 97П), was developed as a response to the renewed interest of the Soviet Navy and Soviet Border Troops on icebreaking patrol vessels after United States Coast Guard and Canadian Coast Guard icebreakers began appearing more frequently near the country's northern maritime borders. New icebreaking patrol vessels were needed because existing Soviet naval vessels could not operate in ice-covered waters and large icebreakers, in addition to being unarmed and operated by civilians, could not be distracted from their primary mission of escorting merchant ships.

Project 97P patrol ships are 70 metres (230 ft) long overall and have a beam of 18.1 metres (59 ft). Fully laden, the vessels draw 6.5 metres (21.3 ft) of water and have a displacement of 3,710 tonnes (3,650 long tons). Their three 1,800-horsepower (1,300 kW) 10-cylinder 13D100 two-stroke opposed-piston diesel engines are coupled to generators that power electric propulsion motors driving two propellers in the stern. In addition to being slightly bigger than the icebreakers they are based on, Project 97P lacks the bow propeller and features a bigger deckhouse built of aluminum-magnesium alloy to reduce weight as well as a helideck capable of receiving Kamov Ka-25 or Ka-27 helicopters.

Project 97P patrol ships were initially armed with a twin 76 mm AK-726 deck gun and two 30 mm AK-630 close-in weapon systems, but the ships operated by the navy were later disarmed.

== History ==
The third of eight Project 97P patrol ships was laid down at Admiralty Shipyard in Leningrad on 26 December 1973, launched on 28 May 1974, and delivered on 26 September 1975. The ship was named after one of the main characters in Alexander Pushkin's poem Ruslan and Ludmila and joined the Soviet Navy Red Banner Northern Fleet.

Following the dissolution of the Soviet Union, Ruslan was passed over to the Russian Navy. The vessel remains in service as of 2024.
