= Russian patrol ship Anadyr =

Ivan Susanin-class icebreaking patrol ship

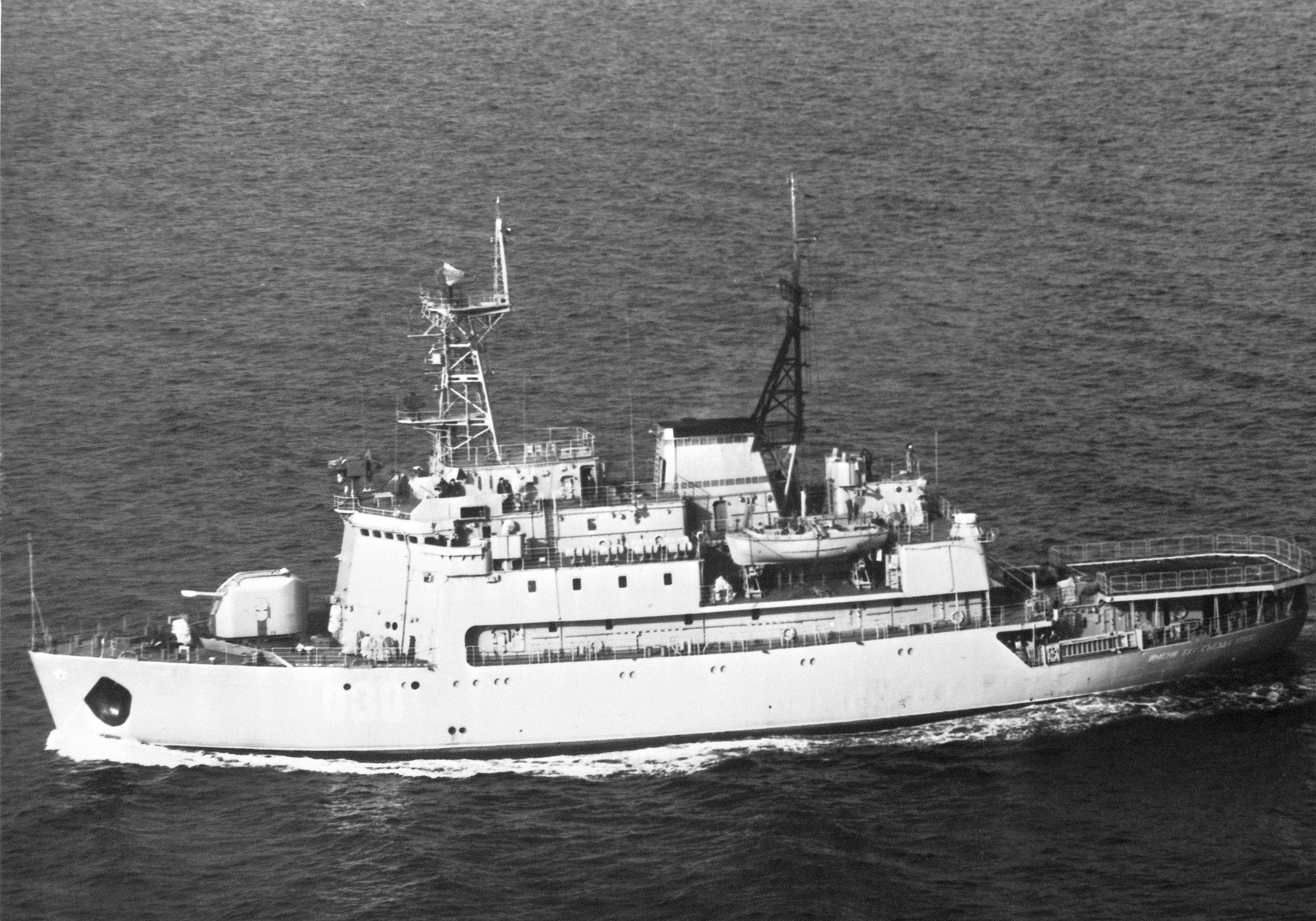
- Anadyr photographed under its previous name, Imeni XXV syezda KPSS, in 1985

History

→ Soviet Union → Russia
- Name: Anadyr (Анадырь; 1992–2015); Imeni XXV syezda KPSS (Имени XXV съезда КПСС; 1976–1992); Dnepr (Днепр; 1976)
- Operator: Soviet Border Troops (1976–1992); Coast Guard of the Border Service of the FSB (1992–2015)
- Builder: Admiralty Shipyard (Leningrad, USSR)
- Yard number: 02653
- Laid down: 16 July 1975
- Launched: 14 February 1976
- Completed: 30 September 1976
- Decommissioned: 3 November 2015
- In service: 1976–2015
- Homeport: Petropavlovsk-Kamchatsky
- Fate: Broken up

General characteristics
- Class & type: Ivan Susanin-class patrol ship
- Displacement: 3,710 t (3,650 long tons) (full load)
- Length: 70 m (230 ft)
- Beam: 18.1 m (59 ft)
- Draught: 6.5 m (21 ft)
- Installed power: 3 × 13D100 (3 × 1,800 hp)
- Propulsion: Diesel–electric; two shafts (2 × 2,400 hp)
- Speed: 15.4 knots (28.5 km/h; 17.7 mph)
- Range: 10,700 nautical miles (19,800 km; 12,300 mi) at 12.5 knots (23.2 km/h; 14.4 mph)
- Endurance: 50 days
- Complement: 10 officers; 113 crew
- Sensors & processing systems: MR-302 Rubka ("Strut Curve") surface and air-search radar; MR-105 Turel ("Hawk Screech") fire-control radar
- Armament: 1 × twin 76 mm AK-726; 2 × 30 mm AK-630
- Aviation facilities: Helideck for Kamov Ka-25 or Ka-27

Anadyr (Russian: Анадырь) was one of eight Project 97P patrol ships built by Admiralty Shipyard in Leningrad in 1973–1981. Laid down as Dnepr (Russian: Днепр), the ship served under the Soviet Border Troops as Imeni XXV syezda KPSS (Russian: Имени XXV съезда КПСС) until 1992 and afterwards under the Border Service of the Federal Security Service (FSB) of Russia until 2015.

== Description ==
In the mid-1950s, the Soviet Union began developing a new diesel-electric icebreaker design based on the 1942-built steam-powered icebreaker Eisbär to meet the needs of both civilian and naval operators. Built in various configurations until the early 1980s, the Project 97 icebreakers and their derivatives became the largest and longest-running class of icebreakers and icebreaking vessels built in the world.

The patrol ship variant, Project 97P (Russian: 97П), was developed as a response to the renewed interest of the Soviet Navy and Soviet Border Troops on icebreaking patrol vessels after United States Coast Guard and Canadian Coast Guard icebreakers began appearing more frequently near the country's northern maritime borders. New icebreaking patrol vessels were needed because existing Soviet naval vessels could not operate in ice-covered waters and large icebreakers, in addition to being unarmed and operated by civilians, could not be distracted from their primary mission of escorting merchant ships.

Project 97P patrol ships are 70 metres (230 ft) long overall and have a beam of 18.1 metres (59 ft). Fully laden, the vessels draw 6.5 metres (21.3 ft) of water and have a displacement of 3,710 tonnes (3,650 long tons). Their three 1,800-horsepower (1,300 kW) 10-cylinder 13D100 two-stroke opposed-piston diesel engines are coupled to generators that power electric propulsion motors driving two propellers in the stern. In addition to being slightly bigger than the icebreakers they are based on, Project 97P lacks the bow propeller and features a bigger deckhouse built of aluminum-magnesium alloy to reduce weight as well as a helideck capable of receiving Kamov Ka-25 or Ka-27 helicopters.

All Project 97P patrol ships were initially armed with a twin 76 mm AK-726 deck gun and two 30 mm AK-630 close-in weapon systems, but the ships operated by the navy were later disarmed.

== History ==
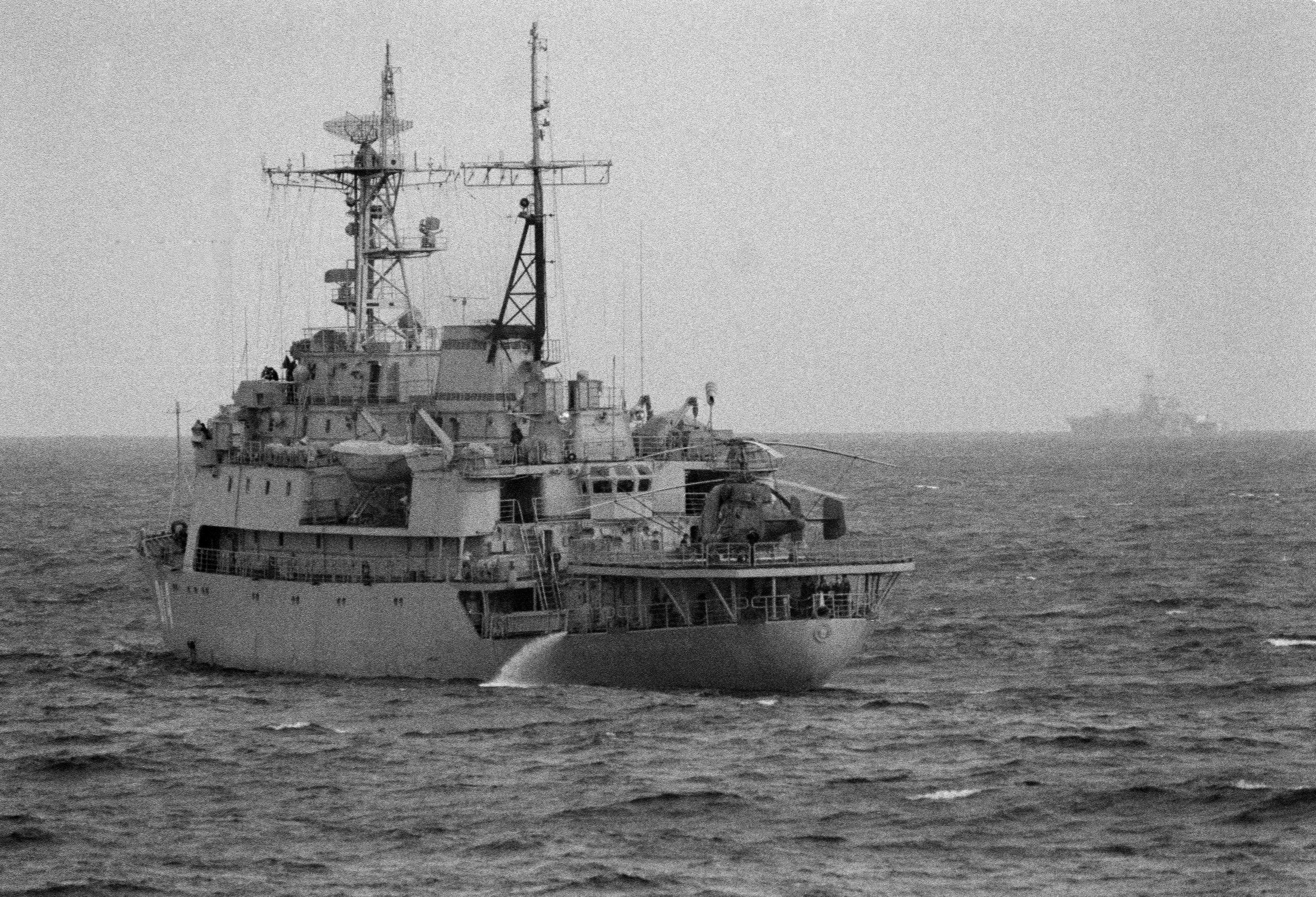
Imeni XXV syezda KPSS with a Ka-25 helicopter on the helideck during the search of survivors from Korean Air Lines Flight 007

The fourth of eight Project 97P patrol ships was laid down at Admiralty Shipyard in Leningrad on 16 July 1975, launched on 14 February 1976, and delivered on 30 September 1976. Laid down as Dnepr after the Dnepr River, the ship was renamed Imeni XXV syezda KPSS to commemorate the 25th Congress of the Communist Party of the Soviet Union. The ship entered service with the maritime unit of the KGB Border Troops and sailed to its home port, Petropavlovsk-Kamchatsky in the Russian Far East, through the Northern Sea Route.

In September 1983, Imeni XXV syezda KPSS participated in the search of survivors from Korean Air Lines Flight 007 that had been shot down by Soviet Air Forces.

Following the dissolution of the Soviet Union, the ship was passed over to the Coast Guard of the Border Service of the Federal Security Service of the Russian Federation and was renamed Anadyr after town of the same name in the Russian Arctic.

In 1994, Anadyr visited made a visit to Juneau, Alaska.

Anadyr was decommissioned on 3 November 2015 and broken up in 2019.
