= Ivan Susanin-class patrol ship =

Soviet icebreaking patrol ships

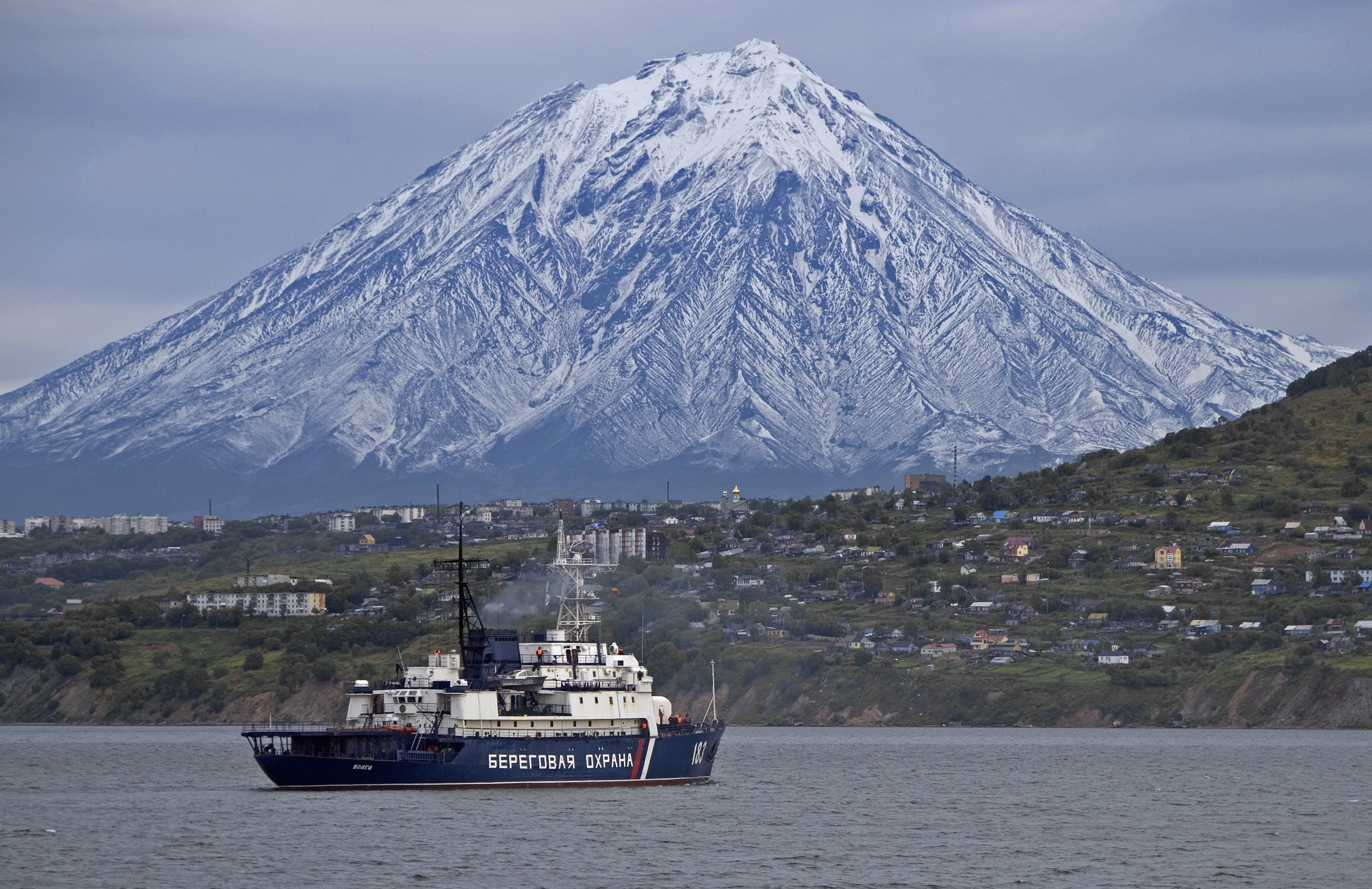

Class overview
- Builders: Admiralty Shipyard, Leningrad
- Operators: Soviet Navy; Soviet Border Troops; Russian Navy; Russian Coast Guard
- Preceded by: Project 52K
- Succeeded by: Purga class; Okean class; Project 23550
- Built: 1972–1981
- In commission: 1972–present
- Completed: 8
- Active: 4
- Scrapped: 4

General characteristics
- Type: Icebreaking patrol ship
- Displacement: 2,785 t (2,741 long tons) (standard); 3,710 t (3,650 long tons) (full load)
- Length: 70 m (230 ft)
- Beam: 18.1 m (59 ft)
- Draught: 6.5 m (21 ft)
- Installed power: 3 × 13D100 (3 × 1,800 hp)
- Propulsion: Diesel–electric; two shafts (2 × 2,400 hp)
- Speed: 15.4 knots (28.5 km/h; 17.7 mph)
- Range: 6,000 nautical miles (11,000 km; 6,900 mi) (full speed); 10,700 nautical miles (19,800 km; 12,300 mi) at 12.5 knots (23.2 km/h; 14.4 mph)
- Endurance: 50 days
- Complement: 10 officers; 113 crew
- Sensors & processing systems: MR-302 Rubka ("Strut Curve") surface and air-search radar; MR-105 Turel ("Hawk Screech") fire-control radar
- Armament: 1 × twin 76 mm AK-726; 2 × 30 mm AK-630
- Aviation facilities: Helideck for Kamov Ka-25 or Ka-27

Ivan Susanin class, also known by its Soviet designation Project 97P (Russian: 97П), is a series of icebreaking patrol ships built for the Soviet Navy and Soviet Border Troops, and today operated by the Russian Navy and Coast Guard of the Border Service of the FSB.

As of 2024, four Ivan Susanin-class patrol ships remain in service: Ivan Susanin with the Pacific Fleet and Ruslan with the Northern Fleet, both with their armaments removed, and Neva and Volga with the Border Service of the FSB.

== Background ==
In the mid-1950s, the Soviet Union began developing a new diesel-electric icebreaker design based on the 1942-built steam-powered icebreaker Eisbär to meet the needs of both civilian and naval operators. Built in various configurations until the early 1980s, the Project 97 icebreakers and their derivatives became the largest and longest-running class of icebreakers and icebreaking vessels built in the world.

Project 97P (Russian: 97П) was developed as a response to the renewed interest of the Soviet Navy and Soviet Border Troops on icebreaking patrol ships after United States Coast Guard and Canadian Coast Guard icebreakers began appearing more frequently near the country's northern maritime borders. New icebreaking patrol ships were needed because existing Soviet naval vessels could not operate in ice-covered waters and large icebreakers, in addition to being unarmed and operated by civilians, could not be distracted from their primary mission of escorting merchant ships. Central Design Bureau "Iceberg" selected the existing Project 97 as the design basis following positive operational experience and the difficulties associated with developing a new design.

== Design ==
At 70 metres (230 ft) long overall and with a beam of 18.1 metres (59 ft), Ivan Susanin-class patrol ships are slightly larger than the icebreakers on which they are based. Fully laden, the vessels draw 6.5 metres (21.3 ft) of water and have a full load displacement of 3,710 tonnes (3,650 long tons). The hull, derived from an older Swedish-built icebreaker, features a round midship with a pronounced tumblehome and practically no flat bottom or sides; this makes the ships uncomfortable to the crew in heavy seas despite having two roll damping tanks. The enlarged deckhouse is built of aluminum-magnesium alloy to reduce weight and provides accommodation for a complement of 10 officers and 113 crew.

Ivan Susanin-class patrol ships share the same diesel-electric power plant with the other Project 97 variants. Their 1,800-horsepower (1,300 kW) 10-cylinder 13D100 two-stroke opposed-piston main diesel engines are in fact reverse-engineered Fairbanks Morse 38 8-1/8 diesel engines manufactured by the Malyshev Factory in the Ukrainian Soviet Socialist Republic. The engines are coupled to double-armature DC generators (2 × 625 kWe) that provide power to 2,400 hp (1,800 kW) DC propulsion motors driving two 3.5-metre (11 ft) four-bladed fixed pitch propellers in the stern. While the patrol ships were not fitted with a third propeller in the bow like the icebreakers they were based on as it was seen prone to damage in Arctic ice conditions, they can still break up to 70 centimetres (28 in) thick ice. In addition, the ships have five 6Ch2B/34 ship service diesel generators.

All Ivan Susanin-class patrol ships were initially armed with a twin 76 mm AK-726 deck gun and two 30 mm AK-630 close-in weapon systems, but the armament was later removed from the ships operated by the navy. Unlike the icebreakers, they are fitted with helideck over the aft deck for Kamov Ka-25 or Ka-27 helicopters.

== Ships in class ==
Name(s)	Namesake(s)	IMO number	Yard number	Laid down	Launched	Completed	In service	Status or fate	Image	Ref
Ivan Susanin (Russian: Иван Сусанин)	Ivan Susanin		02650	31 July 1972	28 February 1973	30 December 1973	1973–present	In service		
Aysberg (Russian: Айсберг)	Russian for "iceberg"		02651	17 October 1973	27 April 1974	25 December 1974	1974–2006	Broken up		
Ruslan (Russian: Руслан)	Ruslan		02652	26 December 1973	28 May 1974	26 September 1975	1975–present	In service		
Anadyr (Russian: Анадырь; 1992–2015); Imeni XXV syezda KPSS (Russian: Имени XXV съезда КПСС; 1976–1992); Dnepr (Russian: Днепр; 1976)	Anadyr; 25th Congress of the CPSU; Dnepr River		02653	16 July 1975	14 February 1976	30 September 1976	1976–2015	Broken up		
Dunay (Russian: Дунай)	Danube River		02654	24 December 1976	5 August 1977	31 December 1977	1977–2017	Broken up		
Neva (Russian: Нева)	Neva River		02655	23 November 1977	28 July 1978	27 December 1978	1978–present	In service	"Neva" with hull number 170	
Volga (Russian: Волга)	Volga River	8640246	02656	27 February 1979	19 April 1980	26 December 1980	1980–present	In service		
Murmansk (Russian: Мурманск; 1996–2013); Irtysh (Russian: Иртыш; 1992–1996); Imeni XXVI syezda KPSS (Russian: Имени XXVI съезда КПСС; 1981–1992)	Murmansk; Irtysh River; 26th Congress of the CPSU		02657	22 April 1980	3 July 1981	25 December 1981	1981–2013	Broken up		
