= Russian patrol ship Volga =

Ivan Susanin-class icebreaking patrol ship

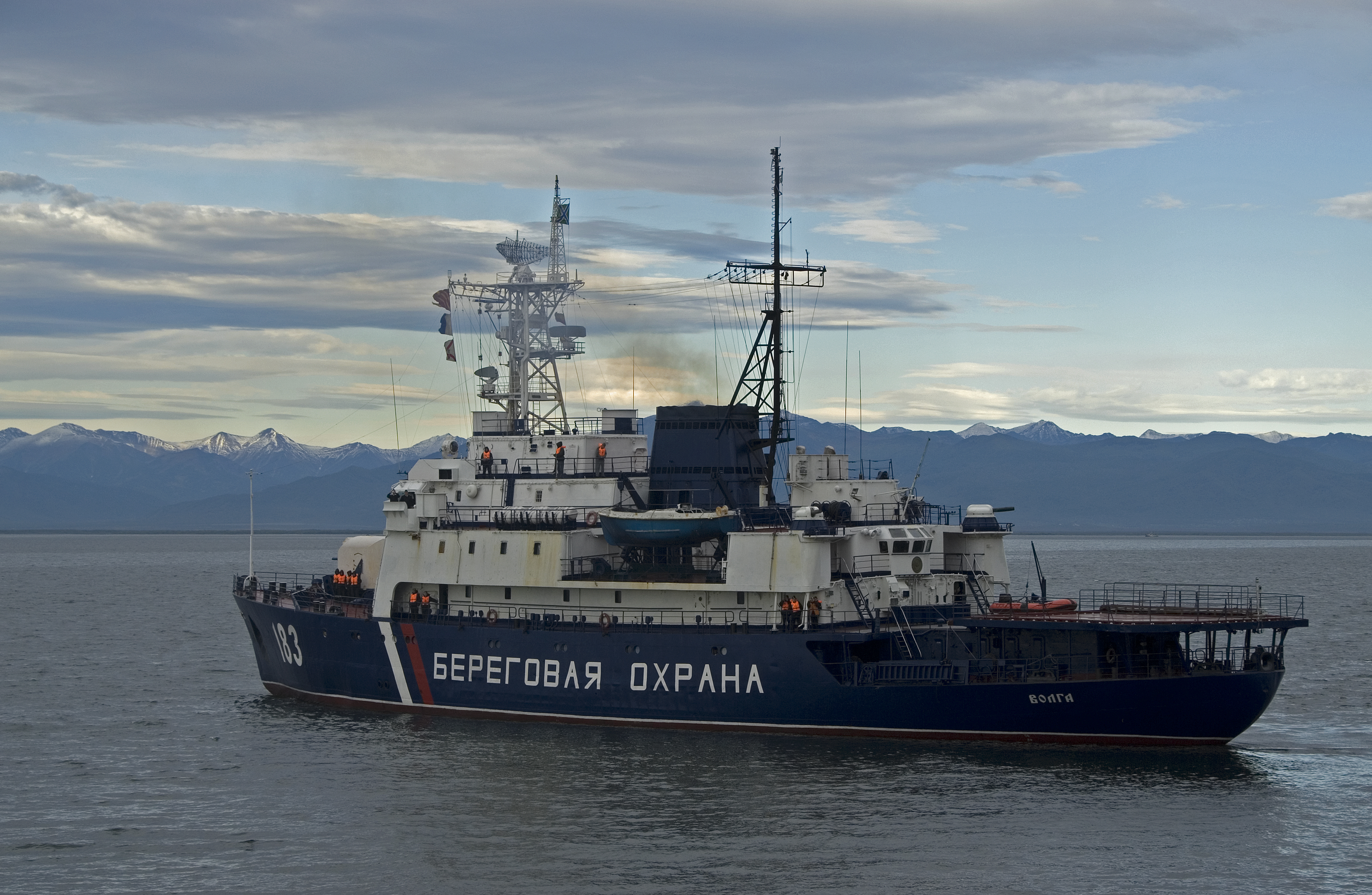
- Volga in Petropavlovsk-Kamchatsky in 2007

History

→ Soviet Union → Russia
- Name: Volga (Волга)
- Namesake: Volga River
- Operator: Soviet Border Troops (1980–1992); Coast Guard of the Border Service of the FSB (1992–present)
- Builder: Admiralty Shipyard (Leningrad, USSR)
- Yard number: 02656
- Laid down: 27 February 1979
- Launched: 19 April 1980
- Completed: 26 December 1980
- In service: 1980–present
- Homeport: Petropavlovsk-Kamchatsky
- Identification: IMO number: 8640246
- Status: In service

General characteristics
- Class & type: Ivan Susanin-class patrol ship
- Displacement: 3,710 t (3,650 long tons) (full load)
- Length: 70 m (230 ft)
- Beam: 18.1 m (59 ft)
- Draught: 6.5 m (21 ft)
- Installed power: 3 × 13D100 (3 × 1,800 hp)
- Propulsion: Diesel–electric; two shafts (2 × 2,400 hp)
- Speed: 15.4 knots (28.5 km/h; 17.7 mph)
- Range: 10,700 nautical miles (19,800 km; 12,300 mi) at 12.5 knots (23.2 km/h; 14.4 mph)
- Endurance: 50 days
- Complement: 10 officers; 113 crew
- Sensors & processing systems: MR-302 Rubka ("Strut Curve") surface and air-search radar; MR-105 Turel ("Hawk Screech") fire-control radar
- Armament: 1 × twin 76 mm AK-726; 2 × 30 mm AK-630
- Aviation facilities: Helideck for Kamov Ka-25 or Ka-27

Volga (Russian: Волга) is a Soviet and later Russian icebreaking patrol ship in service with the Coast Guard of the Border Service of the Federal Security Service of the Russian Federation. It is one of eight Project 97P patrol ships built by Admiralty Shipyard in Leningrad in 1973–1981.

== Description ==
In the mid-1950s, the Soviet Union began developing a new diesel-electric icebreaker design based on the 1942-built steam-powered icebreaker Eisbär to meet the needs of both civilian and naval operators. Built in various configurations until the early 1980s, the Project 97 icebreakers and their derivatives became the largest and longest-running class of icebreakers and icebreaking vessels built in the world.

The patrol ship variant, Project 97P (Russian: 97П), was developed as a response to the renewed interest of the Soviet Navy and Soviet Border Troops on icebreaking patrol vessels after United States Coast Guard and Canadian Coast Guard icebreakers began appearing more frequently near the country's northern maritime borders. New icebreaking patrol vessels were needed because existing Soviet naval vessels could not operate in ice-covered waters and large icebreakers, in addition to being unarmed and operated by civilians, could not be distracted from their primary mission of escorting merchant ships.

Project 97P patrol ships are 70 metres (230 ft) long overall and have a beam of 18.1 metres (59 ft). Fully laden, the vessels draw 6.5 metres (21.3 ft) of water and have a displacement of 3,710 tonnes (3,650 long tons). Their three 1,800-horsepower (1,300 kW) 10-cylinder 13D100 two-stroke opposed-piston diesel engines are coupled to generators that power electric propulsion motors driving two propellers in the stern. In addition to being slightly bigger than the icebreakers they are based on, Project 97P lacks the bow propeller and features a bigger deckhouse built of aluminum-magnesium alloy to reduce weight as well as a helideck capable of receiving Kamov Ka-25 or Ka-27 helicopters.

All Project 97P patrol ships were initially armed with a twin 76 mm AK-726 deck gun and two 30 mm AK-630 close-in weapon systems, but the ships operated by the navy were later disarmed.

== History ==
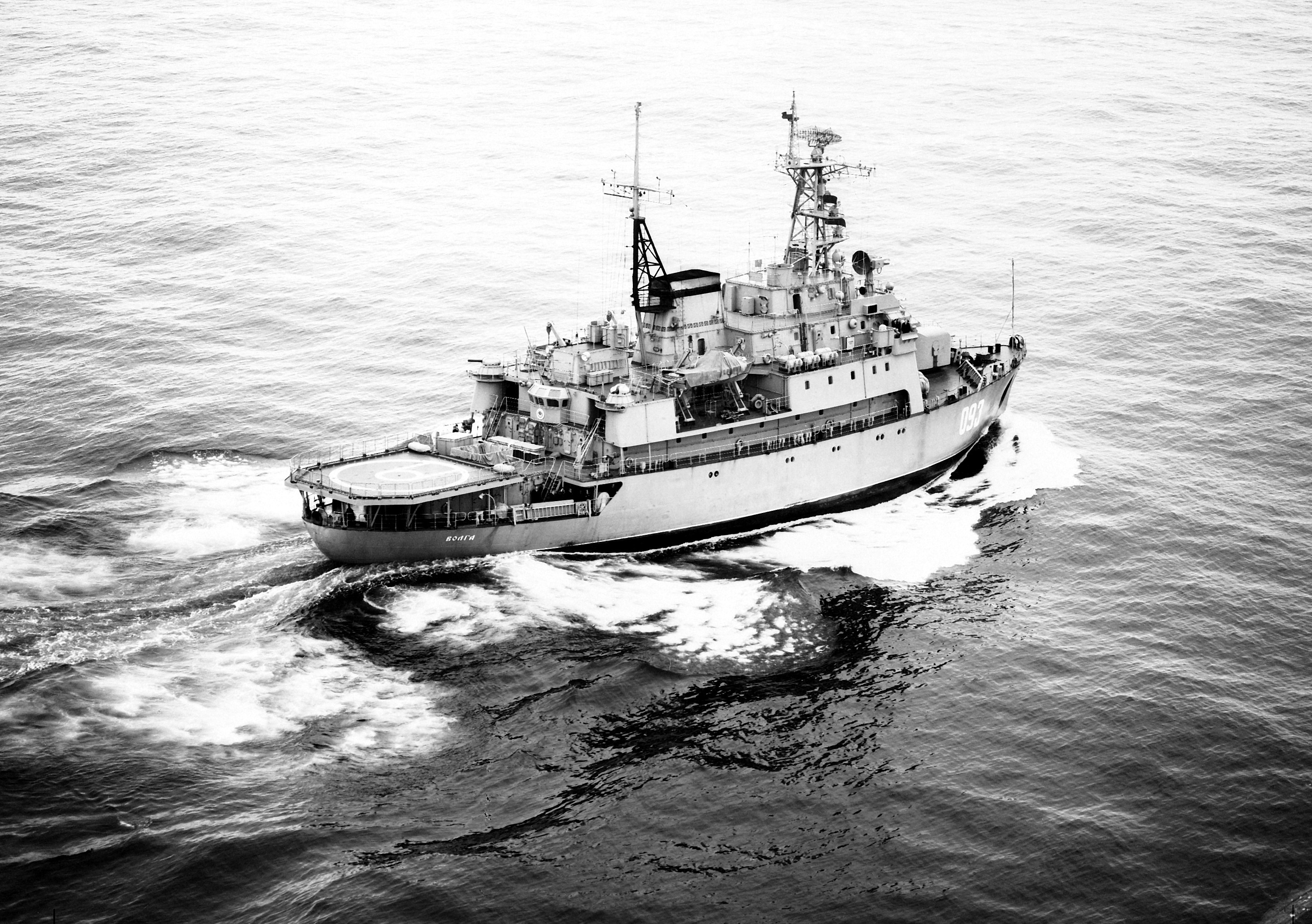
Volga photographed en route to San Francisco to take part in the United States Coast Guard's 200th anniversary celebration.

The seventh of eight Project 97P patrol ships was laid down at Admiralty Shipyard in Leningrad on 27 February 1979, launched on 19 April 1980, and delivered on 26 December 1980. The ship was named after the Volga River and, after sailing to Petropavlovsk-Kamchatsky in the Russian Far East via the Northern Sea Route, joined the maritime unit of the KGB Border Troops.

In May 1990, Volga became the first Soviet vessel to visit the West Coast of the United States since the Second World War when it visited San Francisco during the bicentennial celebrations of the United States Coast Guard.

In 2003, Volga participated in Russian-American naval exercises.

Following the dissolution of the Soviet Union, Volga was passed over to the Coast Guard of the Border Service of the Federal Security Service of the Russian Federation. The vessel remains in service as of 2024.
