= Nikolai Kamov =

Nikolai Kamov may refer to:

- Nikolai Kamov (politician)
- Nikolai Kamov (engineer)
