= Kamov Ka-20 =

Soviet prototype naval helicopter in the 1960s

General information
- Type: Prototype helicopter
- National origin: Soviet Union
- Manufacturer: Kamov
- Status: Retired
- Primary user: Soviet Union

History
- Introduction date: July 1961
- First flight: Tushino Air Display, July 1961
- Retired: Unknown
- Developed from: Kamov Ka-15
- Developed into: Kamov Ka-25

The Kamov Ka-20 (NATO reporting name Harp) was a Soviet twin-engined prototype helicopter designed and built by Kamov that led to the Ka-25 family of helicopters, it was developed, during the early Cold War to counter United States Navy submarines.

== Design and development ==
Developed from the earlier Ka-15 to meet a 1958 Soviet Navy requirement for a heavy shipborne helicopter, the Ka-20 had the similar twin contra-rotating, three-blade rotors of the earlier Ka-15 design and was powered by two 670 kW turboshaft engines. The Ka-20 was built to demonstrate the feasibility of mounting the turboshaft engines above the cabin and it had no mission equipment or corrosion protection although it was fitted with a nose-mounted radome.

The Ka-20 first became known outside the Soviet Union at the 1961 Tushino Aviation Day display where a Ka-20 was demonstrated fitted with dummy missiles on the cabin sides. The design was subsequently developed as the Ka-25 anti-submarine helicopter, NATO reporting name "Hormone".

== See also ==
Related development

- Kamov Ka-25

Related lists

- List of rotorcraft
