= Nikolai Kamov (engineer) =

Soviet aerospace engineer

- Николай Камов
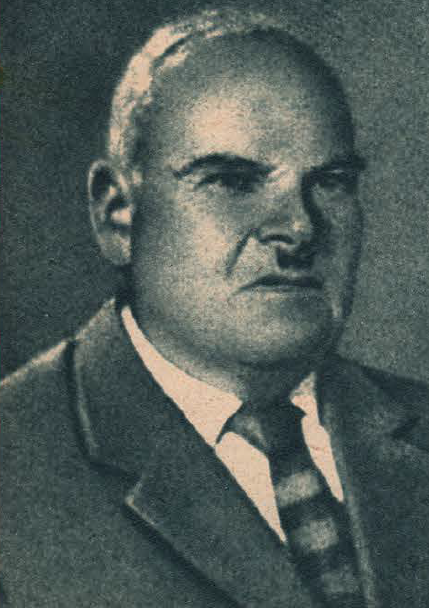
- Kamov in 1973
- Born: Nikolai Ilyich Kamov; September 14, 1902; Irkutsk, Irkutsk Governorate, Russian Empire
- Died: 24 November 1973 (aged 71); Moscow, Russian SFSR, Soviet Union
- Burial place: Novodevichy Cemetery
- Citizenship: Soviet Union
- Education: Tomsk Polytechnic University (1923)
- Occupations: Scientist; Engineer
- Years active: 1923–1973
- Employers: Central Aerohydrodynamic Institute (1931-1939); Kamov Design Bureau (1940-1973)
- Known for: helicopter designer, scientist in aerospace engineering domain, founder of the Kamov Design Bureau (1940)
- Title: Doctor of Science
- Predecessor: None
- Successor: Sergey Mikheyev
- Awards: Hero of Socialist Labour; USSR State Prize

Signature
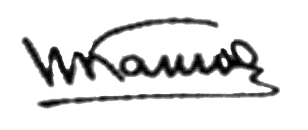

Nikolai Ilyich Kamov (Russian: Никола́й Ильи́ч Ка́мов; 14 September [O.S. 1 September] 1902 – 24 November 1973) was a Soviet aerospace engineer, a pioneer in the design of helicopters, and founder of the Kamov helicopter design bureau.

== Biography ==
Kamov was born in a Russian family, in Irkutsk, but lived in Tomsk until his death on November 24, 1973 in Moscow. He graduated from Tomsk Polytechnic University with an engineering degree in 1923.

Kamov worked with Dmitry Grigorovich and later - for TsAGI. In 1940, he was assigned to establish the new helicopter OKB which was later named after him.

Nikolai Ilyich Kamov died on November 24, 1973, he was 71 years old.

== Awards ==
- 1972 - Hero of Socialist Labour
- 1962, 1972 - Orders of Lenin
- 1957, 1971 - Orders of the Red Banner of Labour
- 1972 - USSR State Prize
- Doctor of Technical Sciences

== Memory ==
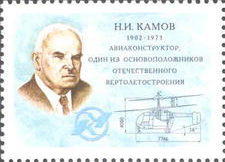
A Soviet post stamp commemorating Kamov's contributions to the Soviet aviation

- Buried at the Novodevichy Cemetery, Moscow
- Since 1992 one of the two main Soviet-Russian helicopter manufacturers bears a surname of Nikolai Kamov
- In 2018 Tomsk airport renamed into Tomsk Kamov Airport to commemorate Nikolai Kamov by decree of the President of the Russian Federation Vladimir Putin.
- Monument to aircraft designer M.L. Mil and N.I. Kamov in Irkutsk on Lenin Street (architect Sergey Demkov). The opening was on July 5, 2023.
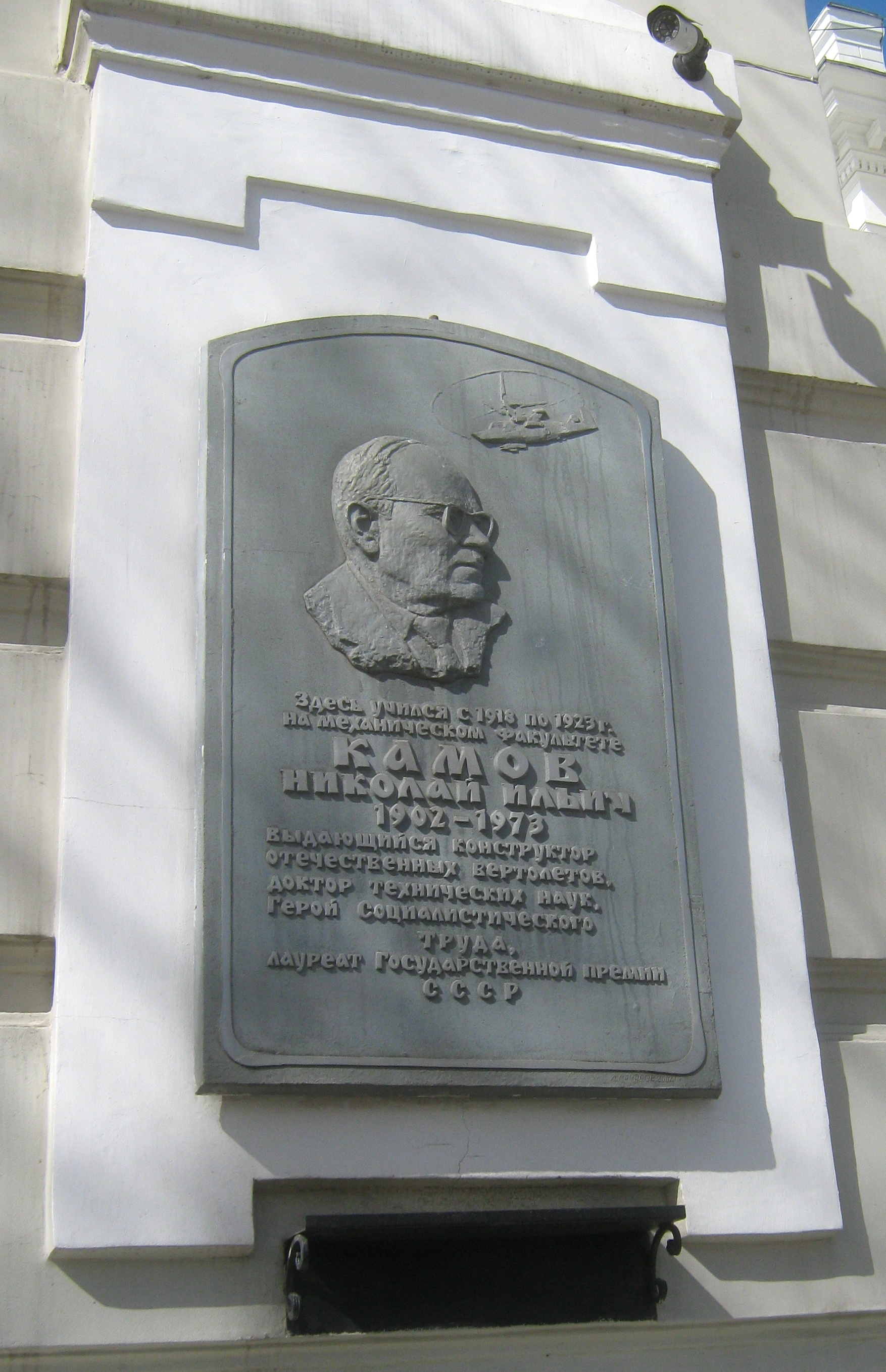
- Memorial plaque in Tomsk
  The M.L. Mil and N.I. Kamov National Helicopter Center ("NCV Mil and Kamov"), established in 2019 on the basis of JSC "Moscow Helicopter Plant named after M.L. Mil" and JSC "Kamov". The company is part of the Russian Helicopters holding company.

== See also ==
- List of Kamov aircraft
