= AK-726 =

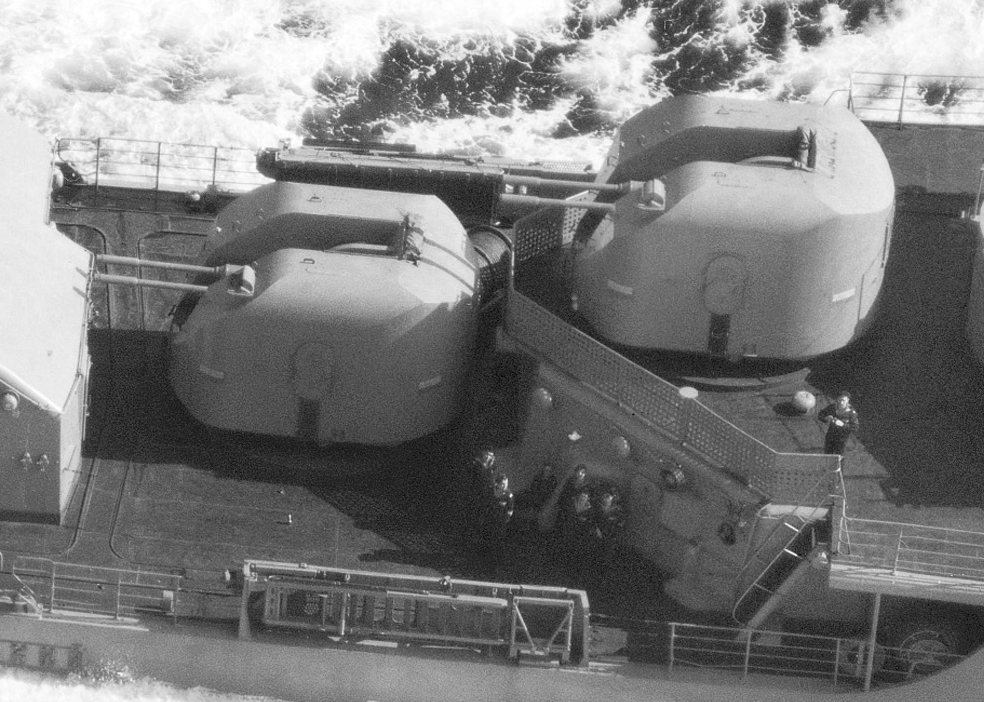
- AK-726 on a Krivak-class frigate
- Type: Naval gun
- Place of origin: Soviet Union

Service history
- In service: 1964–present

Production history
- Designer: (Soviet Union) TsKB-7 (Leningrad)
- Designed: 1958
- Produced: 1962 to 1987–1988

Specifications
- Mass: about 26 t (26 long tons; 29 short tons)
- Barrel length: 59 calibers
- Crew: 9
- Shell weight: 5.9 kg (13 lb)
- Caliber: 76.2 mm (3 in)
- Barrels: 2
- Breech: Sliding wedge
- Elevation: −10° to +85°
- Rate of fire: 2 × 40–45 RPM
- Muzzle velocity: 980 m/s (3,200 ft/s)
- Maximum firing range: Horizontal: to 15,700 m (17,200 yd); Vertical: 11,000 m (36,000 ft) to self-destruct

The AK-726 (abbr. of артиллерийский комплекс) is a twin 76-millimeter (3 in) naval gun, which was developed in the Soviet Union and is still in service in various navies.

== History ==
In 1954 the Soviet Union began development of a naval gun which could be used against both air and sea targets. The gun was developed by the development office TsKB-7 (later Arsenal Design Bureau) under the direction of Pyotr Tyurin. The first tests began in 1958. From 1960, the guns were begun to be installed on ships and tested. In 1962 the first gun was installed on the Groznyy cruiser. A second was installed on the Komsomolets Ukrainy destroyer. The system was officially launched on June 24, 1964. The guns were exported to various Eastern Bloc states over time. Due to the small caliber and lack of effectiveness they were soon replaced by the AK-100, alongside the newer rapid-firing AK-176.

== Construction ==
The gun has two barrels of 76.2 mm (3 in) caliber. The projectiles are hand-loaded into an elevator from the ammunition chamber to the gun. The weapon has an automatic charging system. Both barrels fire simultaneously. This would achieve a theoretical rate of fire of about 100 rounds per minute, but is unsustainable. The barrels must be cooled a few minutes after 40 to 45 rounds of continuous fire. The cooling system is connected to the vessel's main water line.

The fire control is carried out either automatically via a fire-control radar type MR-105 Turel (Russian: МР-105 «Турель», NATO code: Hawk Screech), semi-automatically with the Prisma optical sight, or manually. The gun can be used against air, sea or land targets. There are two different types of high-explosive ammunition available; contact and proximity fuzes.

== Platforms ==
- Mirka class
- Kotlin class
- Kynda class
- Kashin class
- Mod Kashin class
- Petya class
- Ropucha class
- Kara class
- Krivak class
- Koni class
- Kiev class
- Ivan Rogov class
- Ivan Susanin class
- Admiral Petre Bărbuneanu class
- Kotor class
- Mărășești
