= Kamov Ka-25 =

Naval helicopter developed for the USSR

Ka-25
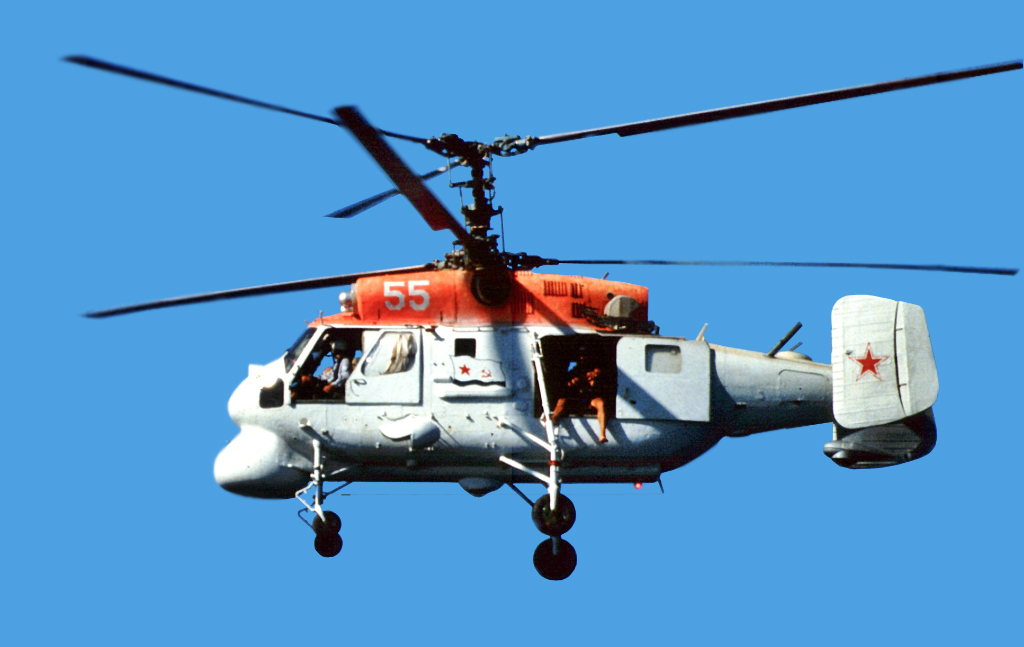
- A Soviet Ka-25PS search and rescue helicopter.

General information
- Type: Anti-submarine / Multi-purpose shipboard helicopter
- Manufacturer: Kamov
- Status: Retired
- Primary users: Soviet Navy Russian Navy
- Number built: ~460

History
- Manufactured: 1966–1975
- Introduction date: 1968
- First flight: 1961
- Developed from: Kamov Ka-20
- Developed into: Kamov Ka-27

The Kamov Ka-25 (NATO reporting name "Hormone") is a coaxial rotor naval helicopter, developed for the Soviet Navy in the USSR from 1958, before being succeeded by the Ka-27. The Ka-25 filled a multitude of roles while it was in service with the Soviet Navy.

== Design and development ==
In the late 1950s there was an urgent demand for anti-submarine helicopters for deployment on new ships equipped with helicopter platforms entering service with the Soviet Navy. Kamov's compact design was chosen for production in 1958. To speed the development of the new anti-submarine helicopter Kamov designed and built a prototype to prove the cabin and dynamic components layout; designated Ka-20, this demonstrator was not equipped with mission equipment, corrosion protection or shipboard operational equipment. The Ka-20 was displayed at the 1961 Tushino Aviation Day display.

Definitive prototypes of the Ka-25 incorporated mission equipment and corrosion protection for the structure. The rotor system introduced aluminium alloy blades pressurised with nitrogen for crack detection, lubricated hinges, hydraulic powered controls, alcohol de-icing and automatic blade folding. Power was supplied by two free-turbine engines sat atop the cabin, with electrically de-iced inlets, plain lateral exhausts with no infrared countermeasures, driving the main gearbox directly and a cooling fan for the gearbox and hydraulic oil coolers aft of the main gearbox. Construction was of stressed skin duralumin throughout with flush-riveting, as well as some bonding and honeycomb sandwich panels. The 1.5m × 1.25m × 3.94m cabin had a sliding door to port flight deck forward of the cabin and fuel tanks underfloor filled using a pressure refueling nozzle on the port side. A short boom at the rear of the cabin had a central fin and twin toed-in fins at the ends of the tailplane mainly for use during auto-rotation. The undercarriage consisted of two noncastoring mainwheels with sprag brakes attached to the fuselage by parallel 'V' struts with a single angled shock absorber to dissipate landing loads, and two castoring nosewheels on straight shock absorbing legs attached directly to the fuselage either side of the cockpit which folded rearwards to reduce interference with the RADAR, all wheels were fitted with emergency rapid inflation flotation collars. Flying controls all act on the co-axial rotors with pitch, roll and collective similar to a conventional single rotor helicopter. Yaw was through differential collective which has a secondary effect of torque, an automatic mixer box ensured that total lift on the rotors remained constant during yaw maneuvers, to improve handling during deck landings. Optional extras included fold up seats for 12 passengers, rescue hoist, external auxiliary fuel tanks or containers for cameras, flares, smoke floats or beacons.

== Variants ==
Ka-25BSh
(NATO reporting name 'Hormone-A') Variants are used in the anti-submarine warfare role, equipped with radar, dipping sonar and a towed MAD and armed with torpedoes and nuclear or conventional depth-charges.
Ka-25BShZ
Mine-sweeping version, eight built.
Ka-25C
Little-known upgrade.
Ka-25F
Proposed assault version in competition with the Mi-22 and the larger Mi-24. Modified with a glazed nose, cargo compartment with four doors, an under-fuselage turret with a GSh-23L and provision for up to six 9M17 Phalanga Anti-tank missiles or six UB-16 rocket launchers, each with 16 S-5 rockets or bombs.
Ka-25Ts
(NATO reporting name 'Hormone-B') Over The Horizon targeting version for relaying data to cruise missiles launched from surface warships and submarines. Anti-submarine equipment, Electronic Surveillance Measures and weapons bay removed and larger radar scanner/reflector in a bulged radome under the nose. Also recognisable by the semi-retractable landing gear and a small cylindrical data-link antenna under the rear fuselage.

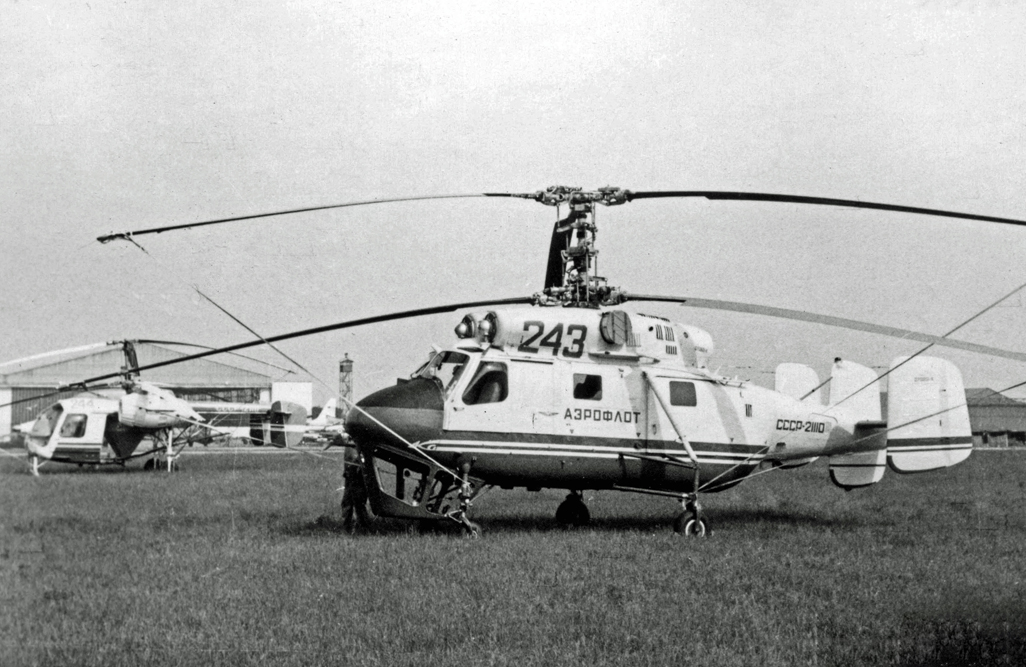
Kamov Ka-25K in Aeroflot markings at the 1967 Paris Air Show

Ka-25K
Civilian flying crane helicopter with a gondola under the lengthened nose for controlling slung loads up to 2,000 kilograms (4,400 lb). Fitted with electrically de-iced rotor blades and optional seats for 12 passengers. A single prototype (SSSR-21110) flown in 1966.
Ka-25PS
(NATO reporting name 'Hormone-C') Search and rescue and transport version with no weapons bay, radome as Ka-25BSh. Normal equipment included seats for 12, rescue winch, provision for stretchers and auxiliary tanks. Optional equipment included a homing receiver, Electronic Surveillance Measures, searchlight and loudspeaker. Ka-25PS helicopters were usually painted red and white.
Ka-25T
(NATO reporting name 'Hormone-B') Possibly misidentified or incorrect designation for Ka-25Ts OTH targeting relay aircraft.
Ka-25TL
Missile tracking version. Also known as the Ka-25TI and Ka-25IV.

== Operators ==
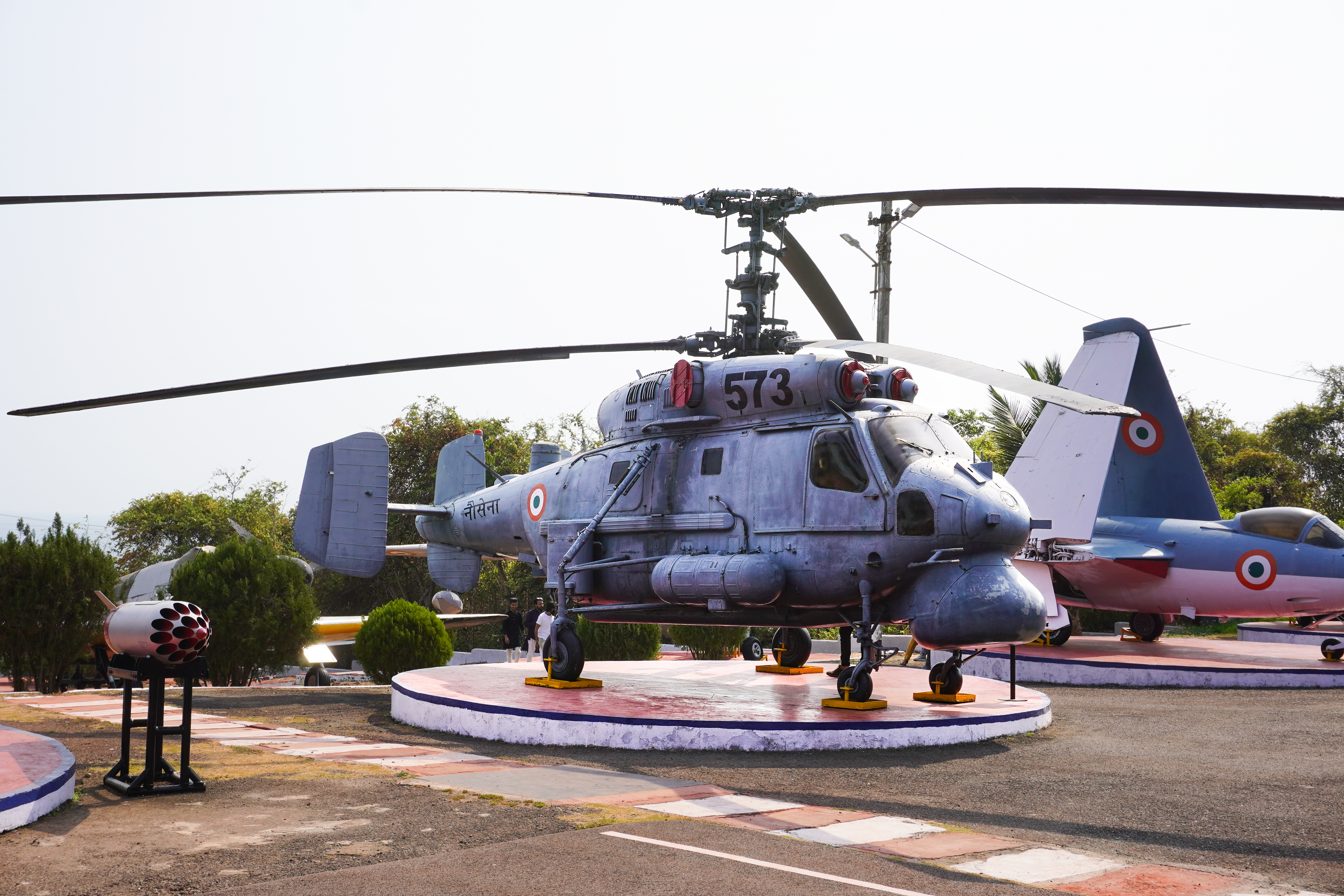
Decommissioned Indian Navy Ka-25 at the Naval Aviation Museum in Goa.

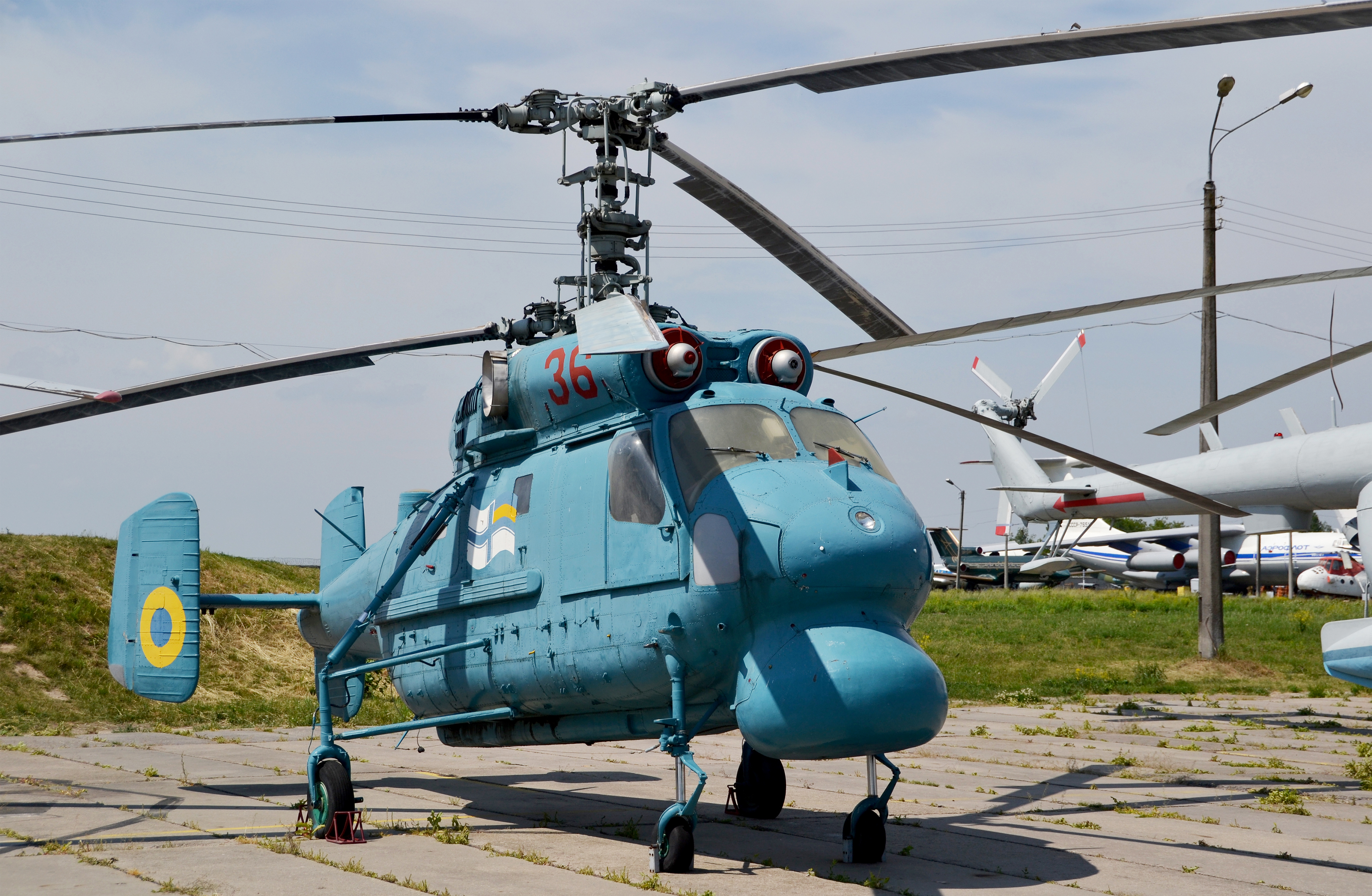
Decommissioned Ukrainian Navy Ka-25 at the Ukraine State Aviation Museum in Kyiv

Former operators

Bulgaria

- Bulgarian Navy

India

- Indian Naval Air Arm

Russia

- Russian Naval Aviation

Soviet Union

- Soviet Naval Aviation

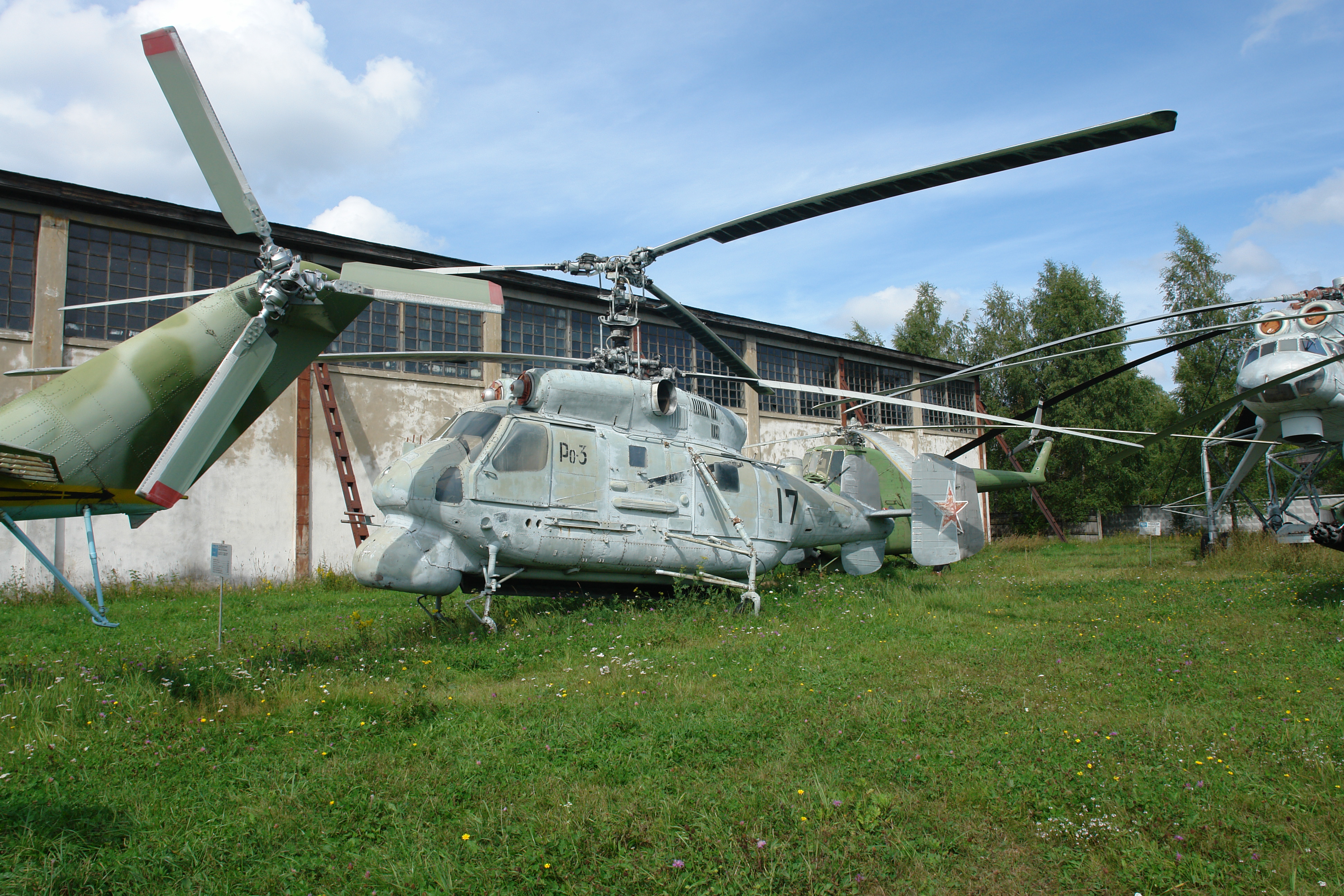
Soviet Navy Ka-25 at the Monino Central Air Force Museum outside Moscow.

Syria

- Syrian Navy

Ukraine

- Ukrainian Naval Aviation

Vietnam

- Vietnam People's Navy

Yugoslavia

- Yugoslav Air Force

== Specifications (Ka-25BSh) ==
Data from

General characteristics

- Crew: 4
- Length: 9.75 m (32 ft 0 in)
- Height: 5.37 m (17 ft 7 in)
- Empty weight: 4,765 kg (10,505 lb)
- Gross weight: 7,500 kg (16,535 lb)
- Powerplant: 2 × Glushenkov GTD-3F turboshaft, 671 kW (900 hp) each
- Main rotor diameter: 2 × 15.74 m (51 ft 8 in)
- Main rotor area: 389.2 m^{2} (4,189 sq ft) contra-rotating 3-bladed rotors

Performance

- Maximum speed: 209 km/h (130 mph, 113 kn)
- Cruise speed: 193 km/h (120 mph, 104 kn)
- Range: 400 km (250 mi, 220 nmi)
- Service ceiling: 3,350 m (10,990 ft)

Armament

- 1,900 kg (4,189 lb) of disposable stores

== See also ==
Related development

- Kamov Ka-20
- Kamov Ka-27

Aircraft of comparable role, configuration, and era

- Kaman SH-2 Seasprite
- Westland Lynx

Related lists

- List of military aircraft of the Soviet Union and the CIS
- List of rotorcraft
