= Admiralty Shipyards =

Shipyard in Saint Petersburg, Russia

Coordinates: 59°55′09″N 30°16′21″E

- Type: Shipyard
- Industry: Shipbuilding; Defence
- Predecessors: Main Admiralty Shipyard; Galley Shipyard; Galernaya Shipyard; New Admiralty Shipyard; Leningrad Shipyard; Shipyard No. 194 (in the name of Marti); United Admiralty Association
- Founded: 1704; 322 years ago in Saint Petersburg, Russian Empire
- Founder: Tsar Peter the Great
- Headquarters: Saint Petersburg, Russia
- Revenue: $67 million (2016)
- Operating income: $137 million (2016)
- Net income: $77.4 million (2016)
- Total assets: $1.34 billion (2016)
- Total equity: $473 million (2016)
- Number of employees: 3,000/10,000 (1914/today)
- Parent: United Shipbuilding Corporation
- Website: admship.ru

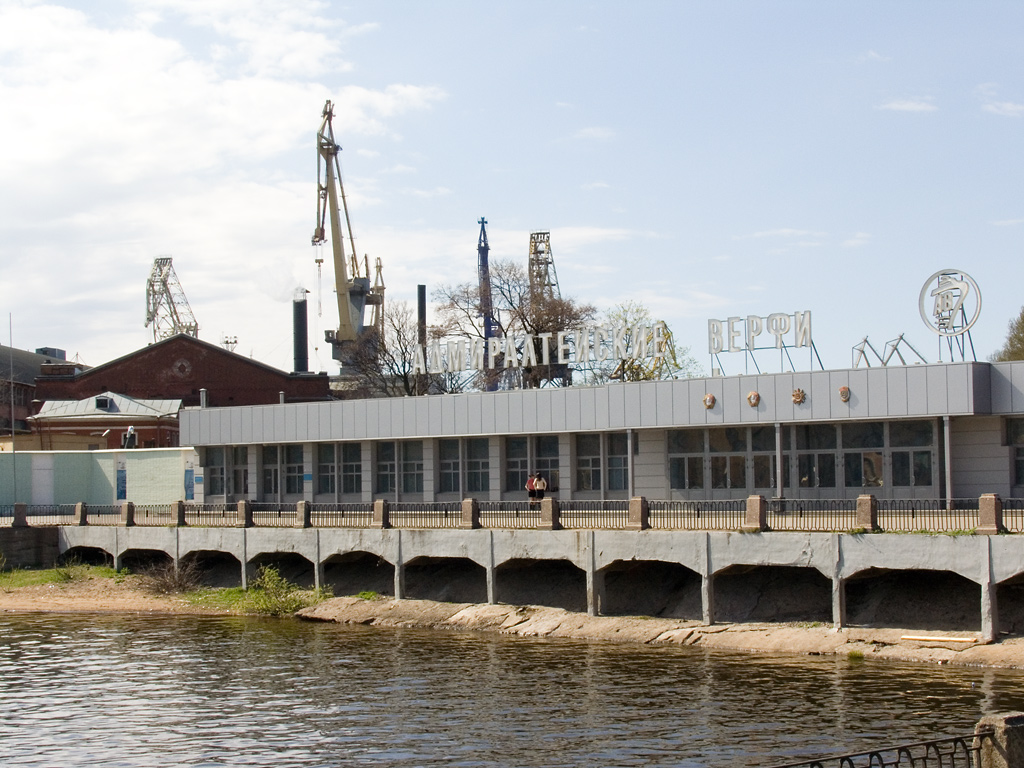
Admiralty Shipyards in Saint Petersburg

The JSC Admiralty Shipyards (Russian: Адмиралтейские верфи) (formerly Soviet Shipyard No. 194) is one of the oldest and largest shipyards in Russia, located in Saint Petersburg. The shipyard's building ways can accommodate ships of up to 70,000 tonnes deadweight (DWT), 250 metres (820 ft) in length and 35 metres (115 ft) in width. Military products include naval warships such as nuclear and diesel-powered submarines and large auxiliaries.

== History ==
=== General history ===
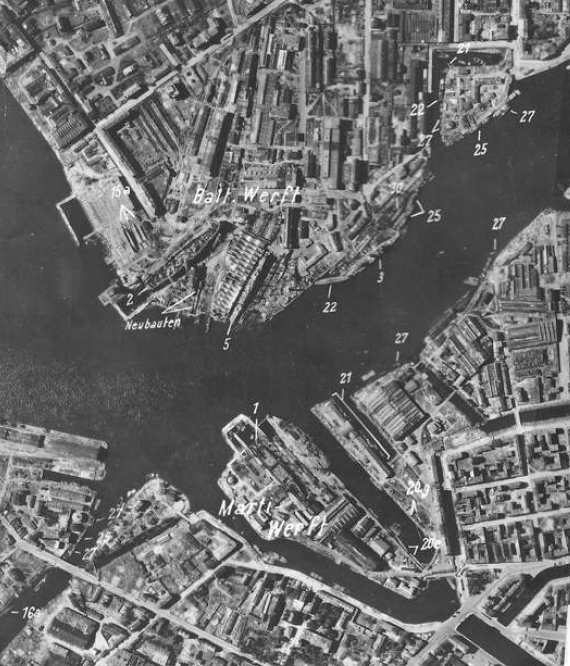
Luftwaffe aerial reconnaissance photo of the Ordzhonikidze Yard (Shipyard No. 189) (top) and Marti and Sudomekh Shipyards (bottom), Leningrad, 7 July 1941

The shipyard was founded as the Galley Yard by Peter the Great during the Great Northern War on 5 November 1704 and located in the open ground along the Neva River behind the Admiralty building. It was administered by the Russian Admiralty, hence its later name. In 1721 it was renamed Galley Wharf and in 1800 the New Admiralty Yard, supplementing and in 1841 soon replacing the Galley Wharf. In 1908, it was renamed the Admiralty Shipyard. In 1937 its two sections were known as Andre Marti and Sudomekh, Shipyards No. 194 and No. 196, respectively. In 1966 it once again became the New Admiralty Shipyard as in 1800 and, in 1972, the Leningrad Admiralty Association. The latest name changes occurred in 1992 – State Enterprise "Admiralty Wharves" – and in 2001 – Federal State Unitary Enterprise "Admiralty Wharves". Finally, in 2008, it became an open stock company – OAO "Admiralty Wharves".

From its founding through 1917 the shipyard built more than 1000 vessels and ships, including 137 large sail warships, about 700 medium and small sail and oared vessels, and more than 100 iron ships, including 25 armored warships and 8 cruisers. In 1959 it delivered the world's first non-naval nuclear-powered vessel, the icebreaker Lenin.

In the 19th century it was a major builder of battleships and submarines and cruisers in the 20th. Since the mid-1950s its surface-ship facilities have specialized in large merchant ships, icebreakers, large rescue and salvage ships, fish-factory ships, floating dry docks, and a few naval auxiliaries.

Examples of non-military production from the Admiralty Wharves abound in St. Petersburg, from the bronze tablets, candelabra, and angel of the Alexander Column in Palace Square, the statuary and roof of St. Isaac's Cathedral, a number of bridges over the canals, and most of the ornate cast iron fencing in old St. Petersburg. All were products of the shipyard's foundry.

=== Post-Soviet history ===
In the 1990s, Admiralty Shipyards became a joint stock company.

On 24 December 2022 CEO Alexander Buzakov died suddenly. He had served 11 years in that position.

=== History by type ===
==== Submarines ====
In 1966, the shipyard delivered the Victor I-class nuclear attack submarine, and later the Victor II and Victor III-class submarines as well as the titanium hulled Alfa class.

From 1973 to 1998, the shipyard has built 298 submarines, including 41 nuclear submarines, as well as 68 submersibles. The specialized submersibles produced include the civilian Sever-2 (1969), Tinro-2 (1972), Bentos (1975–1982), Tetis (1976), Osa, Argus, and Osmotr (1988) types, plus the naval Lima, Uniform, Xray, Beluga, and Paltus classes.

Admiralty Shipyards still specializes in submarine shipbuilding. The most recently built submarines include Kilo-class submarines (2,325 DWT) and the smaller Petersburg/Lada class (1,600 DWT). In 1992 Iran purchased two Kilo-class submarines for $600 million from the United Admiralty Sudomekh shipyard, with an option to buy a third. The shipyard's latest development are the Lada-class submarine and its export version, the Amur-class submarine, which does not yet have a customer.

A unique deep-sea research vehicle "Konsul" is the first Russian deep-diving vehicle of the third generation, capable of diving as deep as 6 kilometers (3.7 mi) and working for 10 hours using a manipulator as well as lifting to the surface a load of up to 200 kilograms (440 lb). The construction of underwater vessels constitutes 70% of the total production volume of the shipyard. Out of all submarines built in the world, 15% by tonnage are produced at the Admiralty Shipyards.

Admiralty Shipyards in St. Petersburg will build six Kilo-class diesel-electric submarines for delivery to Vietnam, the Russian business daily Kommersant said in April 2009. The paper quoted company general director Vladimir Aleksandrov as saying that Russia's state arms exporter Rosoboronexport would soon sign a contract with a foreign state, and that Admiralty Shipyards had been chosen to fulfill this contract. Sources in Rosoboronexport later confirmed that Russia and Vietnam had been negotiating a $1.8 billion deal on the delivery of six Kilo-class submarines to the Vietnamese navy for about a year. Admiralty Shipyards is currently building two Kilo-class submarines for Algeria to be delivered in 2009 and 2010.

==== Oil tankers ====
In 1997 it started construction of ice class tankers of 20,000 DWT, designed for simultaneous transportation of up to four different cargo grades. The tanker has double hull and is able to run in solid-ice up to a half-meter thick at a speed of 1½–2 knots. During recent years the shipyard constructed five ships for Russia's largest oil company (Lukoil)—Astrakhan, Magas, Kaliningrad, Saratov, Usinsk. All of which are working on the Northern Sea Route.

== Present day ==
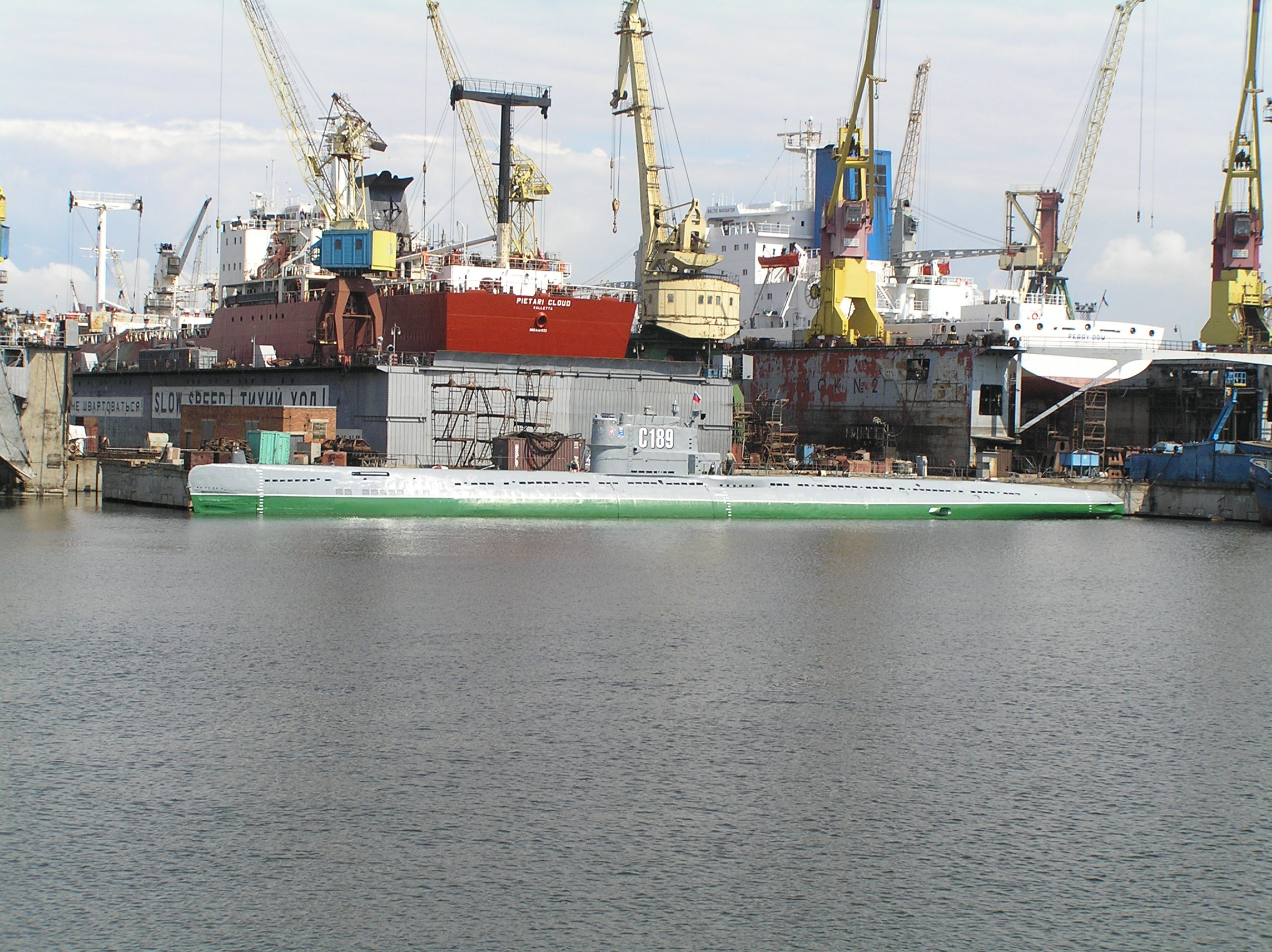
Russian submarine S-189 (project 613) Whiskey class in Saint-Petersburg, Russia (July 2007); being turned into a museum

Military shipbuilding consists of orders from the Russian Ministry of Defense and export orders for foreign governments. The shipyard's military orders are primarily submarines, but also include non-military repair, modernization and building of other underwater technical innovations for oceanic development.

The shipyard announced on 24 December 2022 that general director Alexander Buzakov had died suddenly that day. It did not give a reason. He had been in the job since August 2011. United Shipbuilding Corporation released a statement: "The United Shipbuilding Corporation, the Admiralty Shipyards and the entire national shipbuilding industry have suffered an irreparable loss, as Alexander Sergeevich Buzakov, Director General of the Admiralty Shipyards, passed away at the age of 66."

== Extension on Kotlin Island ==
It is unknown what will happen with the project to have new shipyards built on Kotlin Island. These shipyards were to be created specifically for building of two Mistral-class amphibious-assault ships. The construction of these ships is all but cancelled.

== Facilities and services ==
Available Slips, Docks, Berths
Building Ways	Length	Width	Deadweight tonnage
2 open sloping slips	up to 259 metres (850 ft)	up to 35 metres (115 ft)	70,000
2 covered berths	up to 100 metres (330 ft)	up to 10 metres (33 ft)	10,000
5 covered berths	up to 120 metres (390 ft)	up to 20 metres (66 ft)	10,000
Floating dry dock "Luga"	92 metres (302 ft)	27 metres (89 ft)	6,000
Floating dry dock "SPD-2M"	92 metres	22 metres (72 ft)	2,000

== See also ==
- Charles Baird (engineer)
- Baltic Shipyard
- Severnaya Verf
- Sovkomflot
- List of ships of Russia by project number

== Bibliography ==
- Breyer, Siegfried (1992). Soviet Warship Development: Volume 1: 1917–1937. London: Conway Maritime Press. ISBN 0-85177-604-3.
- de Saint Hubert, Christian & Drashpil, Boris V. (1985). "Main Shipyards, Enginebuilders and Manufacturers of Guns and Armour Plate in the Saint Petersburg Area Up to 1917". Warship International. XXII (4). Toledo, Ohio: International Naval Research Organization: 333–60. ISSN 0043-0374.
- Harrison, Mark; Cooper, Julian; Dexter, Keith & Rodionov, Ivan (c. 2003). The Numbered Factories and Other Establishments of the Soviet Defence Industry Complex, 1927 to 1968, Part I, Factories & Shipyards (Version 8 ed.). Warwick, UK: University of Warwick, Department of Economics.
- Polmar, Norman (1983). Guide to the Soviet Navy (3rd ed.). Annapolis, Maryland: Naval Institute Press. ISBN 0-87021-239-7.
- Polmar, Norman & Noot, Jurrien (1991). Submarines of the Russian and Soviet Navies, 1718–1990. Annapolis, Maryland: Naval Institute Press. ISBN 0-87021-570-1.
