= Kamov =

Russian rotorcraft manufacturing company

- Type: Joint stock company
- Industry: Aerospace, defence
- Founded: 1940; 86 years ago
- Founder: Nikolai Il'yich Kamov
- Headquarters: Lyubertsy, Russia
- Products: Helicopters
- Revenue: $69.9 million (2017)
- Operating income: $6.09 million (2017)
- Net income: $963,289 (2017)
- Total assets: $292 million (2017)
- Total equity: $7.8 million (2017)
- Parent: Russian Helicopters
- Website: rhc.ru/en

JSC Kamov (Russian: Камов) is a rotorcraft manufacturing company based in Lyubertsy, Russia.

The Kamov Design Bureau (design office prefix Ka) has more recently specialised in compact helicopters with coaxial rotors, suitable for naval service and high-speed operations.

== History ==
Kamov was founded by Nikolai Ilyich Kamov, who started building his first rotary-winged aircraft in 1929, together with N. K. Skrzhinskii. Up to 1940, the year of Kamov plant establishment, they created many autogyros, including the TsAGI A-7-3, the only armed autogyro to see (limited) combat action.

From 2002 AFK Sistema controlled a 51% stake in the company, with MiG controlling the remaining 49%. Kamov was sold to Oboronprom in 2005.

Kamov merged with Mil and Rostvertol to form Russian Helicopters. The Kamov brand name was retained, though the new company dropped overlapping product lines.

== See also ==
- Aircraft industry of Russia
- List of Kamov aircraft
