= Coast Guard of the FSB Border Service =

Coast Guard of the FSB Border Service of Russia Береговая охрана Пограничной службы ФСБ России
- Racing stripe since 1993

- Naval ensign since 2008

- Pennants for ships (top) and boats (bottom) since 2008

Agency overview
- Formed: 20 July 2004

Jurisdictional structure
- Operations jurisdiction: Russia

Operational structure
- Agency executive: Admiral Gennady Medvedev, Acting Commander of the Coast Guard
- Parent agency: Federal Security Service; FSB Border Service

Facilities
- Boats: 300 vessels

Notables
- People: Inokentiy Nalyotov; Vyacheslav Serzhanin
- Significant operation: War on Piracy; Russo-Georgian War; 2021 Black Sea incident; Russo-Ukrainian war; Invasion of Crimea; Kerch Strait incident; Russian invasion of Ukraine

The Coast Guard of the FSB Border Service of Russia (Russian: Береговая охрана Пограничной службы ФСБ России, romanized: Beregovaya okhrana Pogranichnoy sluzhby FSB Rossii), previously known as the Maritime Units of the KGB Border Troops (Russian: Морские части Пограничных войск КГБ СССР), is the coast guard of Russia.

The purpose of the formation of the Coast Guard of the FSB Border Service of Russia is to create a modern comprehensive and multifunctional system for protecting the national interests of Russia in the border area on the border area (sea coast, inland sea waters and the territorial sea), in the exclusive economic zone and on the continental shelf of Russia, taking into account the ongoing changes in political, economic, social life in the country and providing favorable conditions for the implementation of legal economic, fishing and other activities in the maritime border area of Russia.

Currently, the Coast Guard is part of the FSB Border Service of Russia (Russian: Пограничная служба ФСБ России).

== History ==
=== Marine Units of the Border Troops of the USSR ===
The naval ensign of Soviet Border Troops watercraft and later of Russian Border Troops watercraft until 1993

After the end of the Second World War in 1945, the Marine Units of the Border Troops (MChPV) carried out the protection of the Soviet Union's maritime borders until its collapse. In different periods of 1945–1957's border troops, along with their member MChPV, included in the structure of the various law enforcement agencies of the Soviet Union: the NKVD, MGB, MVD USSR. In 1957, the Marine units of the border troops, along with the rest of the border units, became part of the State Security Committee under the Council of Ministers of the USSR, which in 1978 was transformed into an independent state committee – USSR State Security Committee (KGB of the USSR).

On October 22, 1991, the KGB of the USSR was abolished, on the basis of its former structures, 3 separate departments were created: the Inter-Republican Security Service, the Central Intelligence Service and the Committee for the Protection of the State Border of the USSR. The latter is responsible for the transfer of powers for the protection of the state border, in connection with which the Border Troops (and, accordingly, the Marine units that are part of them) are transferred to his subordination.

On October 28, 1992, by Decree of the President of the Russian Federation No. 1309 Committee for the Protection of the State Border of the USSR was abolished, in accordance with which the Border Troops, together with their Naval Units, were transferred to the subordination of the Ministry of Security of the Russian Federation (MBRF) formed on January 24, 1992.

On June 12, 1992, the Border Troops of the Russian Federation formed as part of the MBRF on the basis of the former Committee for the Protection of the State Border and the troops subordinate to it, while the Maritime Units of the Border Troops of the Russian Federation (MChPV of Russia) are one of their components.

On December 21, 1993, the MBRF was abolished, on its basis the Federal Counterintelligence Service of the Russian Federation was created, while on December 30, 1993, on the basis of the Border Troops and their control bodies, an independent federal executive body was created: the Federal Border Service – Main Command of the Border Troops of the Russian Federation (FPS – Glavkomat).

=== Maritime Border Forces ===
The naval ensign of Russian Border Guard watercraft from 1993 to 2008

In 1994, as part of the FPS – Glavkomat, the MChPV of Russia was reorganized into the Naval Forces of the Border Troops of the Russian Federation. The command of the naval forces of the Border Troops of the Russian Federation was created – instead of the post of the Deputy Commander of the Border Troops of the Russian Federation for the naval unit, the post of Commander of the naval forces of the Border Troops of the Russian Federation was approved.

December 30, 1994, the FPS – Glavkomat changes its name and is transformed into the Federal Border Service of the Russian Federation (FPS of Russia)

=== Marine Guard ===
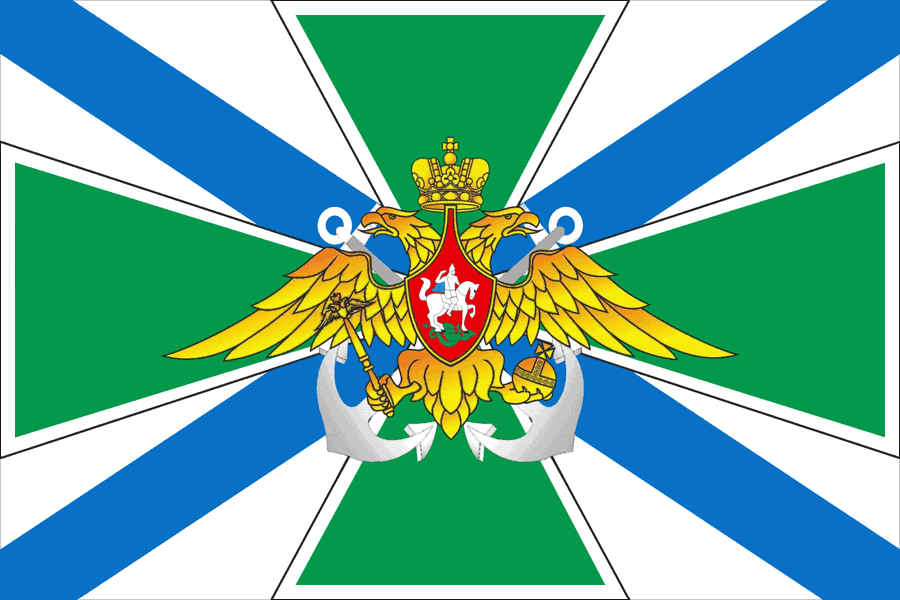
The flag of the FPS Marine Guard from 1999 to 2003

August 29, 1997, in accordance with the Decree of the President of the Russian Federation No. 950 "On measures to ensure the protection of marine biological resources and state control in this area", on the basis of the Maritime Forces of the Border Troops, as well as the staff and material and technical means of the central office and regional fisheries protection bodies of the Ministry of Agriculture and Food of the Russian Federation (Ministry of Agriculture and Food of Russia), the Marine Guard of the Federal Border Service of the Russian Federation (MOKhR FPS of Russia) is formed as part of the FPS of Russia.

Since this period, the MOKhR FPS of Russia, in addition to the defense of the water boundaries of the State Border of the Russian Federation, has been assigned the task of protecting aquatic biological resources in internal sea waters, as well as in the Caspian and Azov Seas. As part of the Federal Border Guard Service of Russia, a management body of the Maritime Guard is formed – the Department of Maritime Guard Admiral I. I. Naletov is appointed Deputy Director – Head of the Department of Maritime Security of the Federal Border Guard Service of Russia, since 1999 – Vice Admiral V. K. Logvinenko.

On July 1, 2003, the Federal Border Service of the Russian Federation is abolished, and its functions are transferred to the jurisdiction of the Border Service created by the same Decree as part of the Federal Security Service of the Russian Federation (FSB of Russia). To organize the activities of the newly created structure, the Organizational Department of the FSB Border Service of Russia is formed, within which, on the basis of the former Maritime Department, the Maritime Directorate of the FSB of Russia is organized – the control body of the Maritime Guard of the FSB Border Service of Russia (MOKhR of the FSB of Russia).

=== Coast Guard ===
On July 20, 2004, on the basis of the Maritime Guard of the FSB of Russia, the Coast Guard of the FSB Border Service of Russia (BOKhR of the FSB of Russia) was formed. In the Organizational Department of the FSB of Russia, the former Maritime Administration is reorganized into the Coast Guard Administration of the FSB Border Service of Russia.

In 2005, the Russian Federation abolished such a type of power structures as border troops – since that time, all military formations, government agencies, inspection bodies and their management bodies of the FSB Border Service of Russia (including the Coast Guard) are called border agencies.

At the same time, in 2005, the FSB Border Service of Russia begins to transfer the system of manning the personnel of military units (ships) of the border agencies completely to a contract basis, with a gradual reduction in the number of servicemen doing military service by conscription. The process of transition to a contractual basis, which equally affected the bodies of the security guard of the FSB of Russia, was completed by the beginning of 2009.

On August 20, 2007, the Coast Guard Directorate was reorganized into the Coast Guard Department of the FSB Border Service of Russia. At present, the main personnel of the Coast Guard, as well as all border agencies of the FSB of Russia, are military personnel doing military service under contract, with the exception of the OMBIR bodies, staffed by federal government officials and civilian personnel.

== Training and study ==
The FSB Coast Guard Institute (Russian: Институт береговой охраны ФСБ России), located in Anapa, was established in 2007. Cadets study for 4 years.

== Ranks ==
| Rank group | General/flag officers | | | Senior officers | | | Junior officers |
|---|---|---|---|---|---|---|---|---|---|---|
| Russian Coast Guard |
| Russian Coast Guard | Адмирал; Admiral | Вице-адмирал; Vitse-admiral | Контр-адмирал; Kontr-admiral | Капитан 1-го ранга Kapitan 1-go ranga | Капитан 2-го ранга Kapitan 2-go ranga | Капитан 3-го ранга Kapitan 3-go ranga | Капитан-лейтенант; Kapitan-leytenant | Старший лейтенант Starshiy leytenant | Лейтенант; Leytenant | Младший лейтенант Mladshiy leytenant |

| Rank group | Under-officers | | NCOs | | | | Enlisted |
|---|---|---|---|---|---|---|---|---|
| Russian Coast Guard |
| Russian Coast Guard | Старший мичман Starshy michman | Мичман; Michman | Главный корабельный старшина Glavny korabelny starshina | Главный старшина Glavny starshina | Старшина 1 статьи Starshina 1 statji | Старшина 2 статьи Starshina 2 statji | Старший матрос Starshy matros | Матрос; Matros |

== Missions ==
The Russian Coast Guard has various missions, such as the protection of Russia's maritime borders, ensuring safe navigation in territorial waters, assisting vessels and aircraft, weather reconnaissance, fisheries protection, and fighting against smuggling and piracy. To perform these missions the Russian Coast Guard uses a variety of vessels and aircraft.

== Patrol vessel deployment ==
Vessels of the Russian Coast Guard serve in all waters of the Russian Federation and, as of 2025, were deployed as follows:

Arctic waters (Note: The Norway–Russia maritime boundary; Russian internal waters in the White Sea Throat, and the Russian EEZ in the Barents Sea.)
23 vessels.

Pacific Ocean (Note: The Russia–United States, Japan–Russia, and North Korea–Russia maritime boundaries; Russian territorial waters in the Bering, Near, La Pérouse, Nemuro, Izmeny, and Sovietsky Straits, and the Russian EEZ in the Chukchi Sea and Pacific Ocean (including the Bering Sea and the Seas of Okhotsk and of Japan).)
77 vessels.

Black Sea (Note: The Russia–Ukraine and Georgia–Russia maritime boundaries; Russian internal waters in the Sea of Azov and Kerch Strait, and the Russian EEZ in the Black Sea.)
74 vessels.

Baltic Sea (Note: The Finland–Russia, Estonia–Russia, Lithuania–Russia, and Poland–Russia maritime boundaries; Russian territorial waters in the Gulf of Finland (Leningrad Oblast), and the Russian EEZ in the Baltic Sea (Kaliningrad Oblast).)
33 vessels.

Caspian Sea (Note: The Azerbaijan–Russia and Kazakhstan–Russia maritime boundaries; the Russian EEZ in the Caspian Sea.)
27 vessels.

Amur River (Note: The China–Russia border (including rivers of the Amur River basin—the Argun, Ussuri, Sungacha, and the lower course of the Shilka—and Lake Khanka).)
41 larger vessels of various types, etc.

Lake Peipus (Note: The Estonia–Russia border (Pskov Oblast).)
6 vessels.

== Vessels in service ==
- Corvettes: 2 – Project 1241.2 Pauk class (Pacific – Sokol, Black Sea - Kuban)
- Offshore patrol vessels::
  - 14 – Project 22460 (Rubin class: 6 Black Sea; 3 Pacific; 2 Northern; 1 in Baltic and 2 in Caspian as of 2022; one Black Sea vessel (Izumrud) reported by Ukrainian sources to have been attacked by drones and sunk in July 2026)
  - 3 – Project 22100 (Okean class: 1 Northern, 2 Pacific)
  - 4 – Project 850285 (all Pacific: Komandor, Manchzhur, Herluf Bidstrup & Shkiper Gek)
- Patrol icebreakers:
  - 2 – Project 97P Ivan Susanin class (both Pacific as of 2025: Neva & Volga)
  - 12 – Project 22120 Purga class (11 Pacific; 1 Northern)
  - Project 23550 icebreaking patrol ship – 2 under construction and planned for service entry with the Coast Guard starting in the mid-2020s (first ship of the class, Ivan Papanin, commissioned with the Russian Navy in 2025; first ship building for the Russian Coast Guard (Purga) may have been damaged in Ukrainian drone attack in March 2026)
- Patrol boats (PCF):
  - c. 30 – Project 10410 (Svetlyak class: serve in Baltic, Black Sea, Northern, Pacific and Caspian regions; at least one vessel serving in the Black Sea reported by Ukrainian sources to have been damaged in July 2026)
  - 21 – Project 12200 (Sobol class: 10 Black Sea, 5 Baltic, 4 Pacific, 2 Northern)
  - 61? – Project 12150 (Mangust class, as of 2022: c. 29 Black Sea - some likely destroyed/damaged, 12 Baltic, 11 Caspian, 9 Pacific, 1 Amur region)
  - 22+ – Project 1496M/M1 (Karadag-class harbour tugs/patrol vessels: c. 6 Pacific, 9 Black Sea, 3 Caspian, 1 Northern, 3 Baltic)
  - 12 – Project P1415 (Flamingo-class border patrol/hydrographic survey/training/communications boats: c. 200 built 1970s to 1990s; 100+ decommissioned/sold abroad; 12 reported in service with the Coast Guard as anti-saboteur/guard boats: 5 Baltic, 1 Black Sea, 5 Northern, 1 Estonian border region/Lake Peipus)
  - 4 – Project R1650 (Rondo class)
  - 7 – Project 03050 (Gyus class: 5 Black Sea, 1 Baltic, 1 Caspian; additional vessels under construction as of 2025)
  - 3 – Project 14310 (Mirage class: 1 Baltic, 2 Caspian)
  - 2+ – Project 1400(M) (Zhuk class: c. 250+ built, late 1960s to 1990s; many decommissioned/sold abroad; one (PSKA-545) reported in service with the Coast Guard in the Black Sea as of 2025; another Zhuk-class vessel, AK-388 (either in Coast Guard or Navy service), transferred from the Northern to the Black Sea Fleet in 2026).
  - 2 – Project 14230 (Sokzhoy class: both Black Sea)
  - 4 – Project 18623 (Mustang 2 class: 2 Caspian, 1 Black Sea, 1 Baltic)
  - 2 – Project 21600 (Khosta class: both Black Sea, PKASS-961 & PKASS-960)
  - 3 – Project 13303/13306 (2 Black Sea - Rostov-Don & Tikhiy Don - 1 Baltic - Grif)
  - 4 – Project 1330/13301 (1 each Black Sea, Northern, Pacific & Caspian)
  - 1 – Project 6457S (Sprut-class vessel Belomorye, Northern)
  - 1 – Project 502 (Border guard patrol ship Diana, Pacific)
  - 8 – Project 503 (Alpinist-class: border patrol vessel variant of Project 503 Intelligence vessel; 1 Northern, 7 Pacific)
  - 4 – Project 810 (Coast Guard patrol ships, all Pacific)
  - 1 – Project 1265 (Sonya class: Astrakhanets converted to border patrol vessel in the Caspian)
- River patrol boats; all deployed in the Amur River basin:
  - 15 – Project 1248 (Vosh class)
  - 8 – Project 1249 (Piyavka class)
  - 4 – Project 12130 (Ogonek class)
  - 11 – Project 1208 (Yaz class: small artillery ships with 100mm guns & point defence surface-to-air missiles; significant number may be inactive)
- Coastal/river logistics ships:
  - 4 – Project 1595 (Neon Antonov class: supply ships, all Pacific)
  - 5 – Project 16900 (Kanin-class supply ships: all Caspian)
  - 1 – Project 15010 (Coast Guard supply ship Ishym - Pacific)
  - 5 – Project 1660 (Kizhi-class supply/guard boat: 3 Caspian, 2 Estonian border region/Lake Peipus)
  - 1 – Project 456 (Kolkhoznitsa-class Coast Guard supply boat: Amur)
  - 2 – Project 1481 (Evoron-class harbor self-propelled tank barge: Amur)
- Landing craft:
  - 1 – Project 1176 (Ondatra class: Baltic - PKAO-772)
  - 2 – Project T4M (Tankist-class landing craft: Amur - PSKA-754 & PSKA-762)
- Armed seagoing tug: c. 14 – Project 745P (Sorum class: c. 4 Northern, 6 Pacific, 2 Black Sea, 1 Caspian, 1 Baltic)
- Harbour tug/training boat:
  - 15 – Project RM376 is variant of long-standing series (Project T376) of which several hundred were built from the 1950s to early 2000s; most decommissioned/sold abroad; RM376 variant for Coast Guard built from 1980s to early 2000s: 3 Baltic, 6 Black Sea, 1 Northern, 3 Pacific, 1 Amur region, 1 Estonian border region/Lake Peipus)
  - 6 – Project 1439 Tugboat (3 Northern, 1 Amur, 2 Estonian border region/Lake Peipus)
  - 1 – Project 1741 River Tug (Amur, PSKR-496)

== Aircraft ==
- Antonov An-26
- Antonov An-72
- Ilyushin Il-76
- Mil Mi-8
- Kamov Ka-27
- Ka-226T
- Schiebel Camcopter S-100

== Weapons ==
Most vessels of the Russian Coast Guard are generally armed with light guns and/or machine guns (such as 12.7 mm general purpose and 14.5 × 114 mm-caliber heavy machine guns, or up to 30 mm cannons - such as the AK-230) but vessels may also carry heavier armament including larger caliber guns, missile systems and torpedoes.

UAVs are also increasingly employed in the service and larger vessels may also embark helicopters.

Russian Coast Guard personnel use a variety of weapons, including but is not limited to the AK series of rifles, pistols, grenade based weapons such as the DP-64 hand anti-diver grenade launcher and the 30 mm AGS-17 automatic grenade launcher, and a variety of machine guns from 7.62 mm machine guns to 14.5 mm machine guns.

== Commanders ==
The flag of the Deputy Commander of the Russian Border Troops for the Naval Unit (1993–1994), and the Commander of the Naval Forces of the Border Troops of the Russian Federation (1994–2008)

- Admiral Innokentiy Nalyotov (1996–1999)
- Vice-Admiral Valery Logvinenko (1999–2004)
- Vice-Admiral Vyacheslav Serzhanin (2004–2006)
- Colonel-General Viktor Trufanov (2006–2011)
- Vice-Admiral Yuri Alexeyev (2011–2017)
- Admiral Gennady Medvedev (2017–present)

== Gallery ==
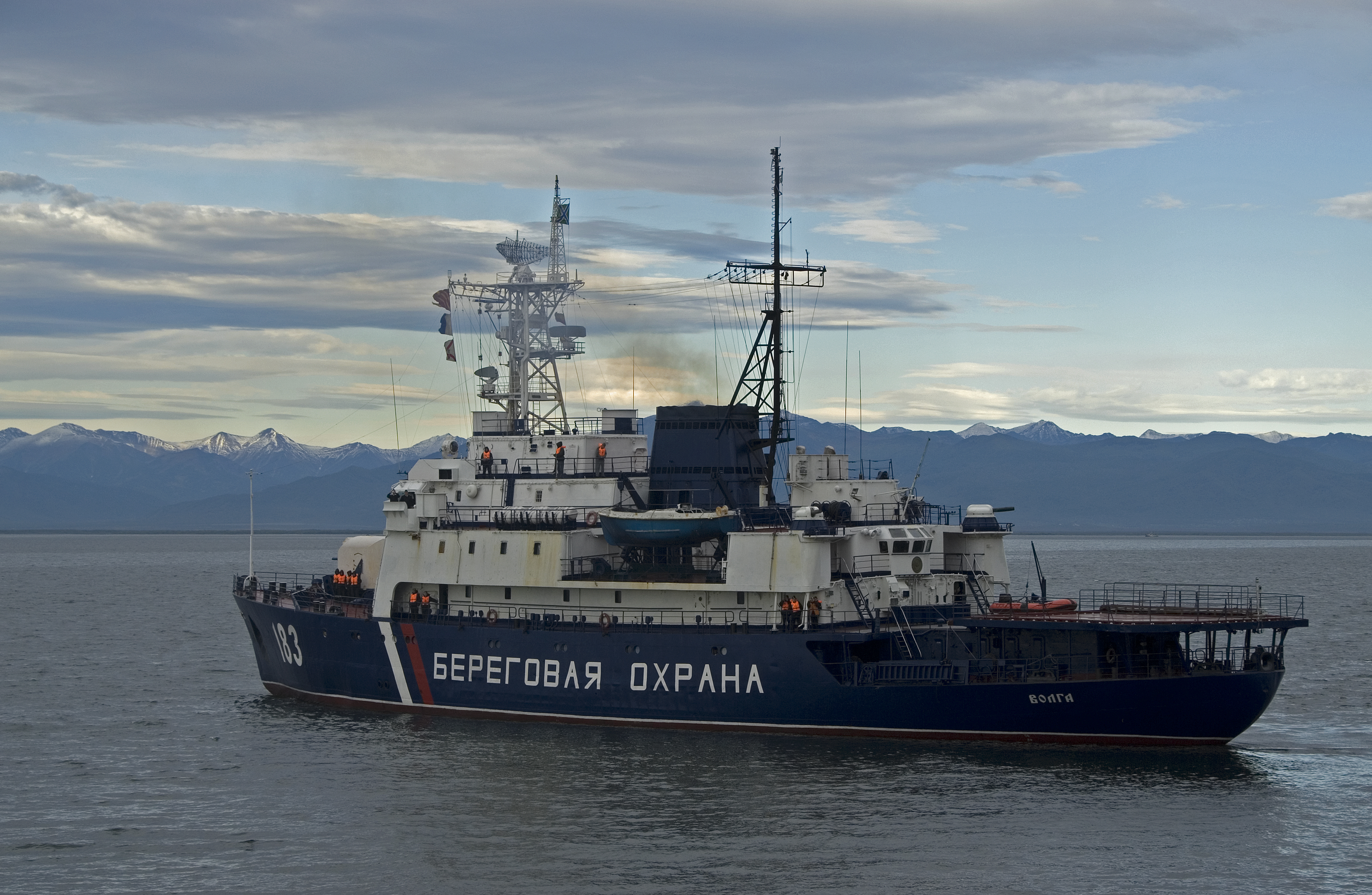
The Russian Coast Guard Ivan Susanin-class patrol ship Volga at Petropavlovsk-Kamchatsky during the 8th North Pacific Coast Guard Agencies Forum, 2007

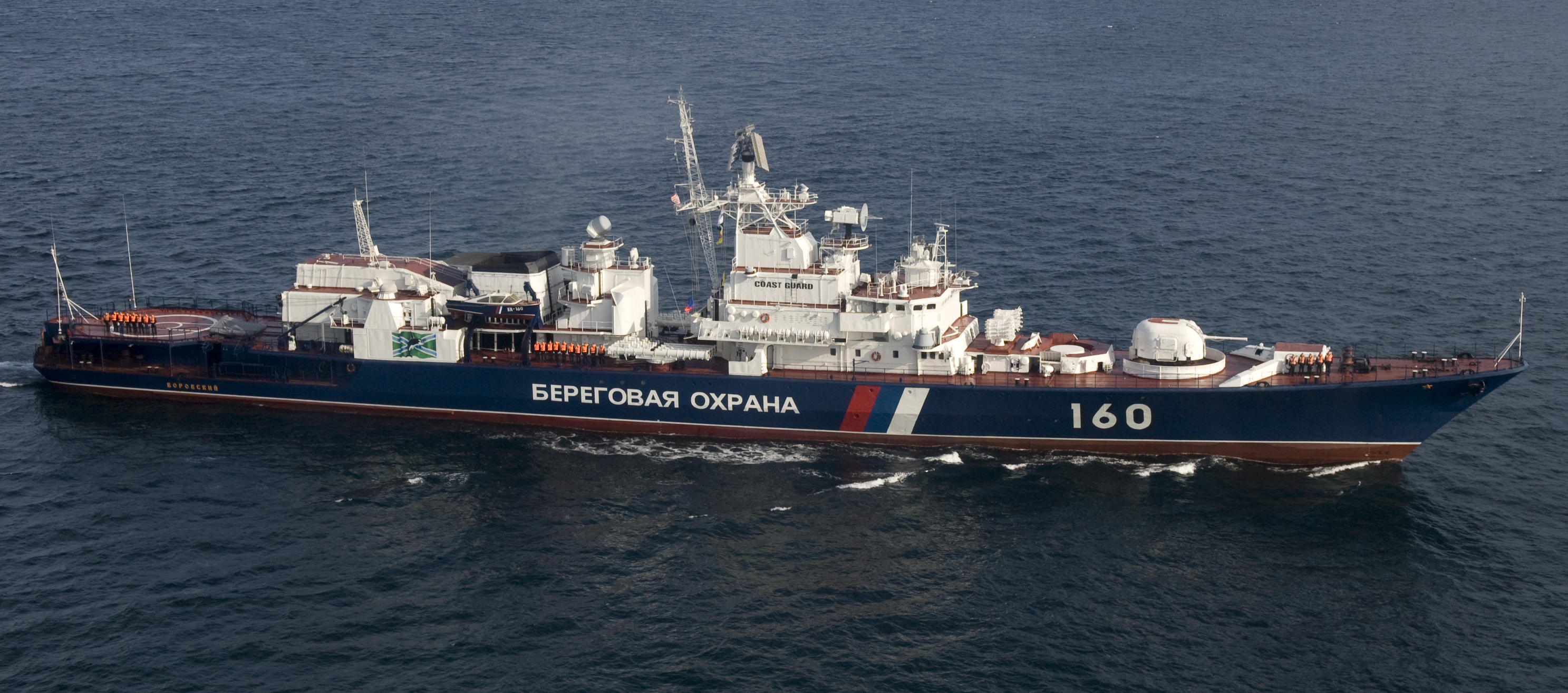
The Russian Coast Guard Krivak III-class frigate Vorovskiy underway at Port Angeles, Washington, during the 10th North Pacific Coast Guard Agencies Forum, 2009

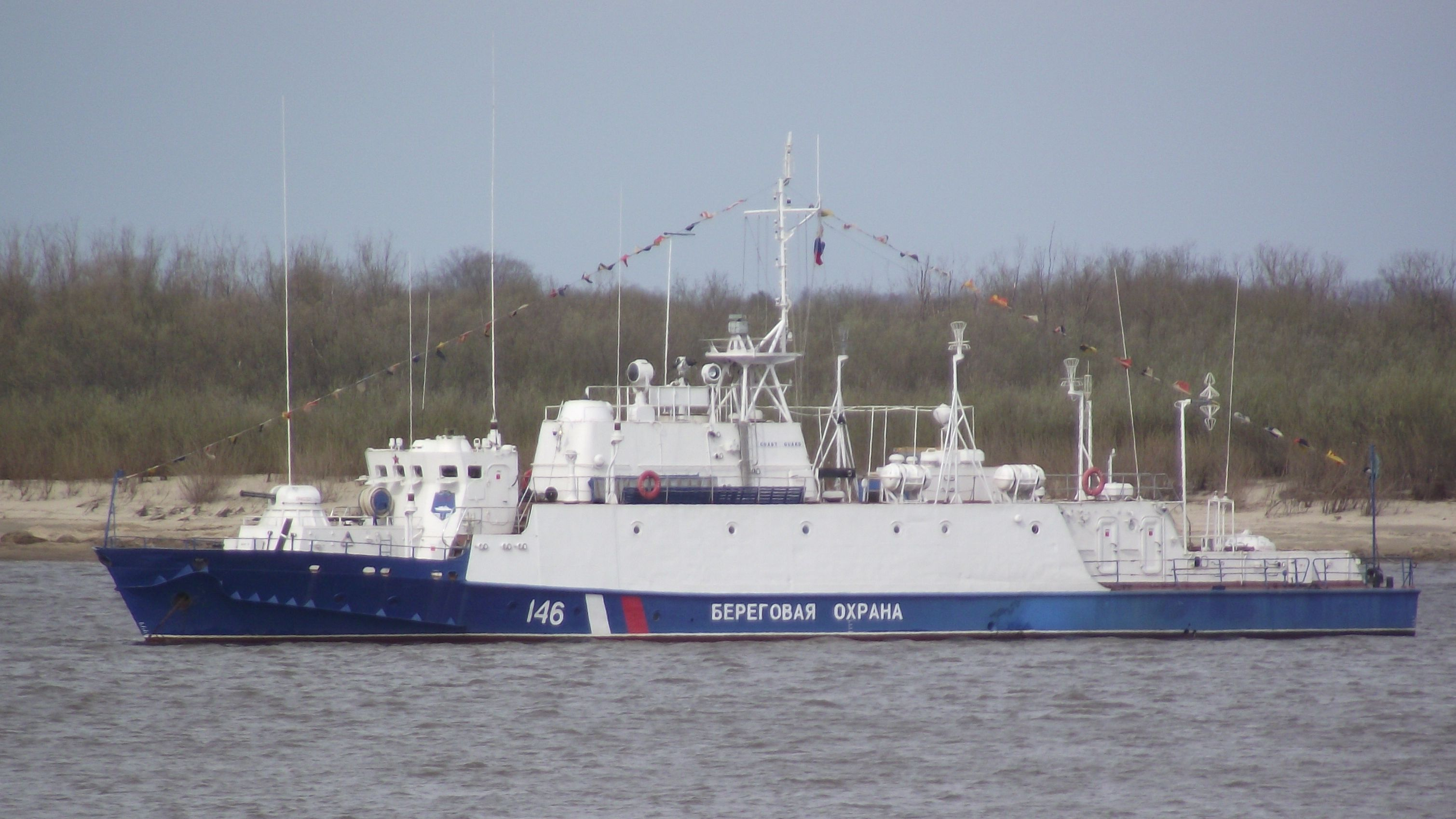
The Russian Coast Guard Piyavka-class river patrol craft PSKR-54 at anchor in the Amur River basin, 2011

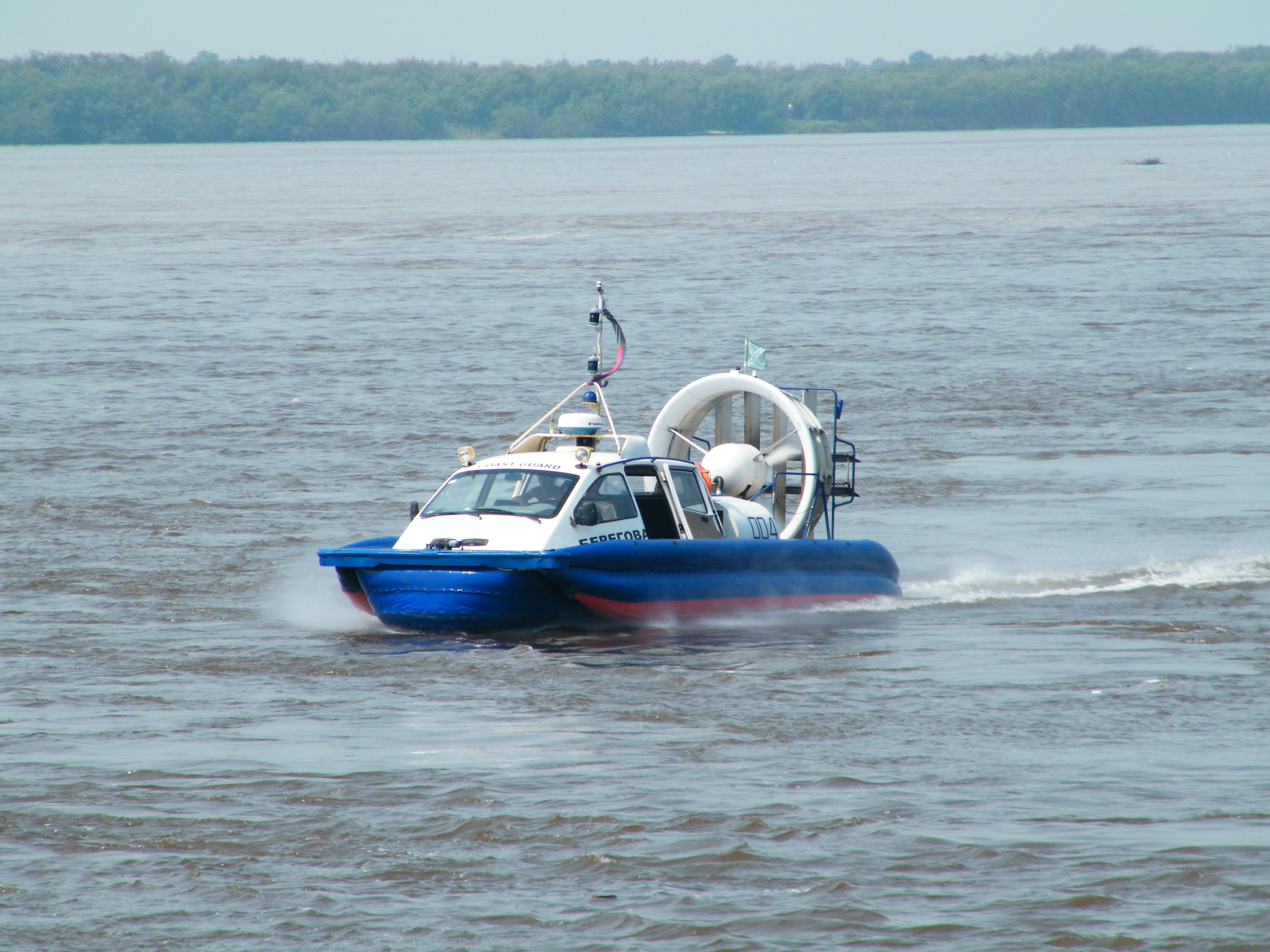
A Russian Coast Guard Mars-700-class patrol hovercraft underway on the Amur River, 2012

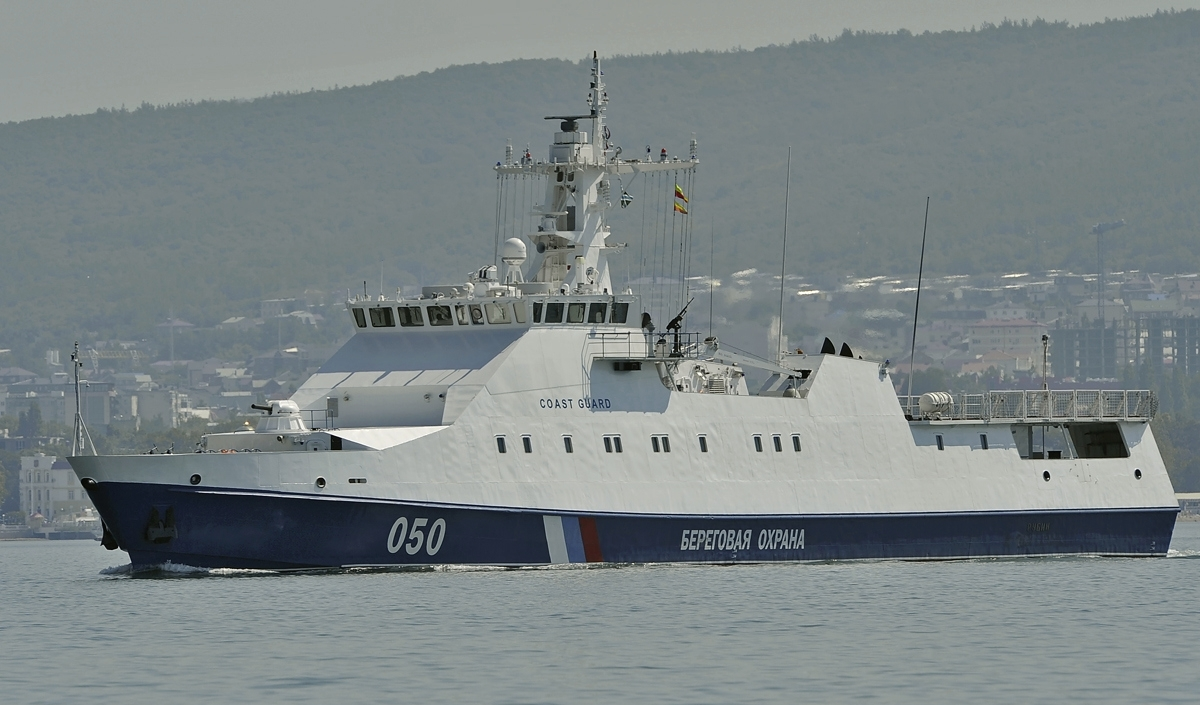
The Russian Coast Guard Rubin-class patrol boat Rubin underway in the Black Sea, 2012

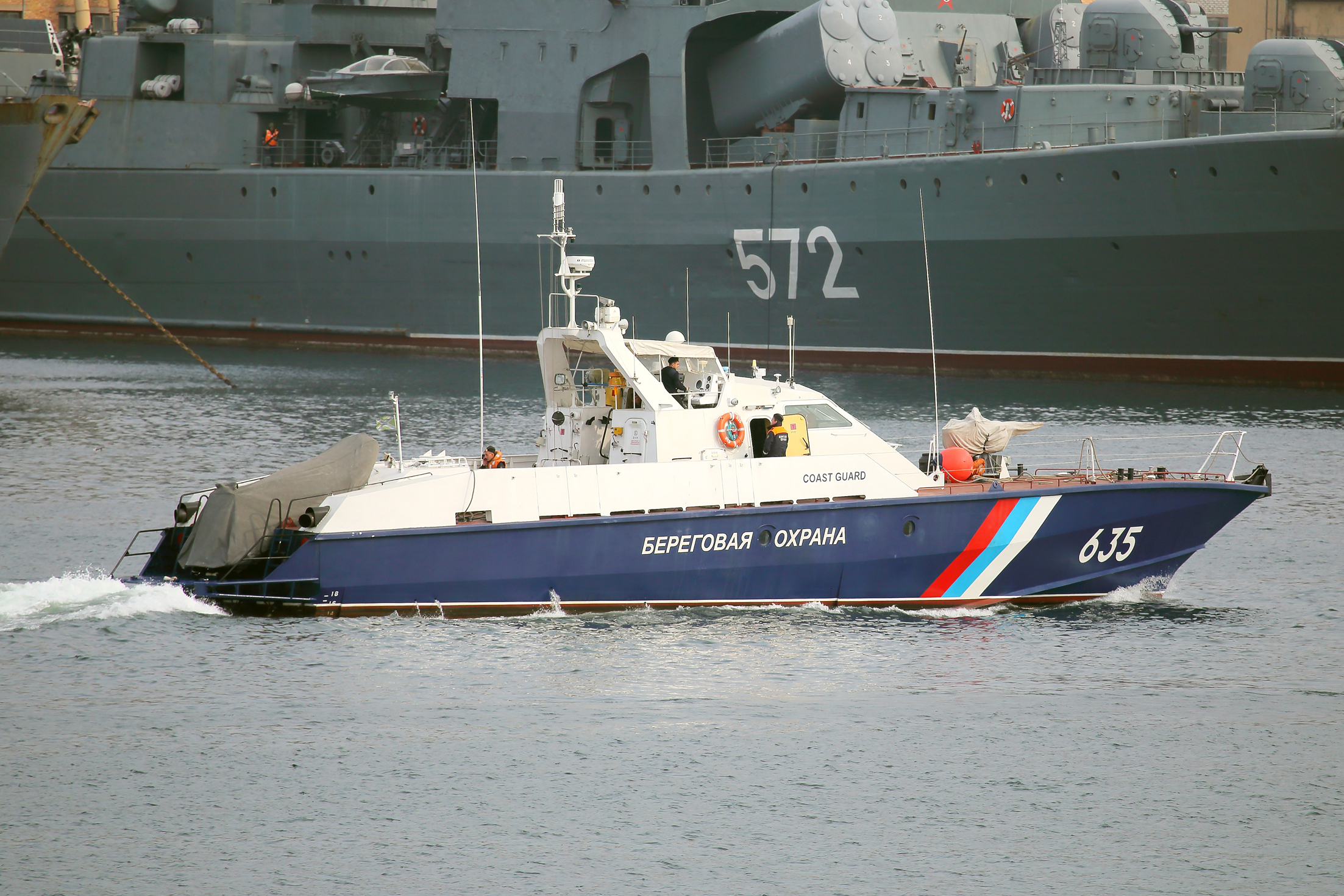
The Russian Coast Guard Sobol-class patrol boat PSKA-310 underway and the Russian Navy destroyer Admiral Vinogradov (background) in Zolotoy Rog Bay at Vladivostok, 2014

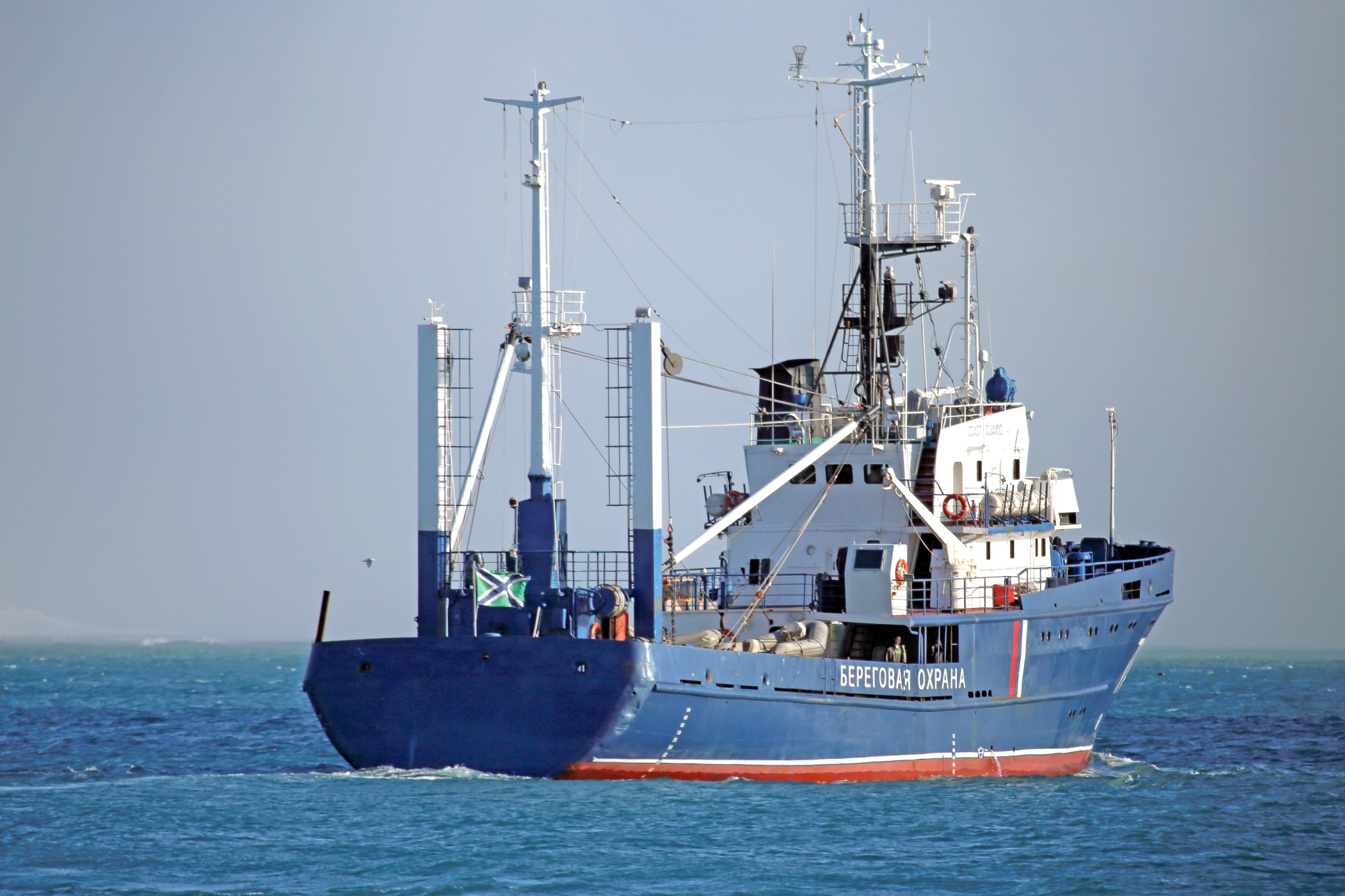
The Russian Coast Guard Alpinist-class (Project 503N/ROS) patrol vessel Bars underway at Kuril Islands, 2015

== See also ==
- National Guard Naval Service Corps, the naval service, water police and coast guard branch of the National Guard Forces Command, National Guard of Russia.
- Greenpeace Arctic Sunrise ship case
