= Yaz-class river gunboat =

Class of Soviet river gunboat in the Russian Navy

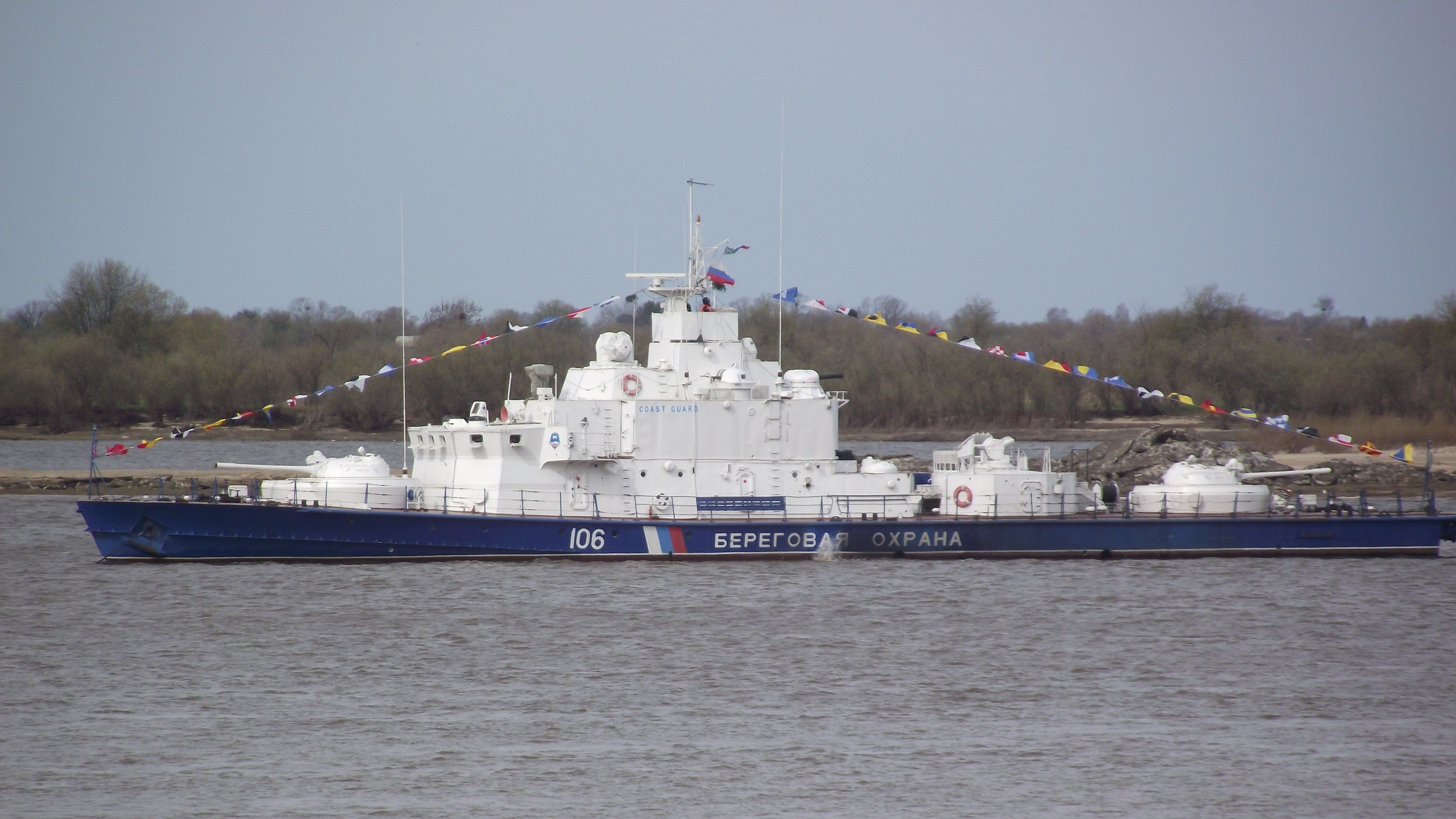
- Yaz-class river patrol craft

Class overview
- Name: Yaz class
- Builders: Khabarovsk Shipyard
- Operators: Soviet Navy (former); Soviet Border Troops (former); Russian Navy (former); Russian Coast Guard
- In commission: 1975-
- Completed: 11
- Active: 1

General characteristics
- Type: River gunboat
- Displacement: 390 t (380 long tons; 430 short tons)
- Length: 55.13 m (180.9 ft)
- Beam: 9.14 m (30.0 ft)
- Draft: 1.44 m (4.7 ft)
- Speed: Max: 23 kn (43 km/h; 26 mph)
- Range: 310 nmi (40 knots)
- Endurance: 10 days
- Complement: 32
- Sensors & processing systems: Mius navigational radar; MR-123 Vympel Bass Tilt Fire Control Radar
- Armament: 2 × T-55 tank turrets; 2 × 100 mm D-10T2S guns; 2 × 7.62 mm coaxially mounted PKT machine guns; 2 × 30 mm AK-630M CIWSs; 2 × twin 12.7 mm Utyos-M machine gun turrets; 1 × twin ZIF-121M Sneg artillery Rocket Launcher; 2 × 30 mm AG-17M Grenade Launchers; 9K32 Strela-2 MANPADS; Various onboard small arms
- Armor: 35 mm armor over superstructure, bridge, and weapons control stations; 8 to 20 mm armor side plating; 100 to 200 mm armor around citadel; 35 mm deck armor

The Yaz-class small artillery craft, also known as Project 1208, is a Russian Coast Guard patrol craft. This gunboat is designed to operate in rivers to secure and protect Russian maritime borders, enforce navigational laws and other law enforcement duties, and search and rescue. The gunboats work alongside other Russian Coast Guard and Navy vessels, such as the Vosh-class and Ogonek-class river patrol crafts. The single active vessel is assigned to the Amur-Ussuri River network.

== Design ==
The patrol craft have a basic design and are powered by diesel engines. It has a distinct weapon suite with two T-55 tank turrets as main weapons. These allows the craft to engage surface, ground, and air threats and targets. The gunboats have cutaway bows to allow for improved navigation through the ice. The vessels are constructed with extensive armor.

== See also ==
- List of ships of Russia by project number
