= Słupsk Bank =

The Słupsk Bank, formerly known as the Stolpe Bank (after the former German name Stolp of the now Polish city of Słupsk) is a bank in the Baltic Sea off the coast of Poland at about 54°58′N 16°36′E.

According to the 1917 Baltic Pilot, the bank is "situated 16 miles northward of Stolpmünde, is about 24 miles long east and west and 10 miles broad. It has on the greater part of it general depths of 5.5 to 10 fathoms [10 to 18 m], sand; the shoalest part is the northwestern, where there are several patches with from 4.25 to 5 fathoms [8 to 9 m] water, and at the western end, where there is a depth of 5.5 fathoms [10 m]. On the southeastern edge of the bank the water deepens suddenly to 16 and 18 fathoms [29 and 33 m] and on the other edges gradually."

It lies within the Polish Exclusive Economic Zone and is best known for its gravel deposits, yielding nearly 3,000,000 m^{3} (3,900,000 cu yd) of gravel during 1985–2003.
