= Sokzhoy-class patrol boat =

Class overview
- Name: Sokzhoy class
- Operators: Russian Coast Guard
- In commission: 2001
- Completed: 2
- Active: 2

General characteristics
- Type: Fast patrol boat
- Displacement: 99.7 t (98.1 long tons; 109.9 short tons)
- Length: 36 m (118 ft)
- Beam: 7.85 m (25.8 ft)
- Draft: 2.16 m (7.1 ft)
- Speed: Max: 55 kn (102 km/h; 63 mph)
- Range: 800 nmi (30 knots)
- Endurance: 5 days
- Complement: 16
- Sensors & processing systems: MR-3PV Liman-18M1 navigational radar; Communication systems
- Armament: 1 × 30 mm AK-306; Small arms

The Sokzhoy-class fast patrol boat, also known as Project 14230, is a Russian Coast Guard vessel. The patrol craft is designed to operate on the coast, rivers, lakes, ports and other littoral areas. It will perform standard Russian Coast Guard missions such as protection of Russian maritime borders, law enforcement, enforcement of navigational rules, search and rescue, and fisheries protection. Both boats, PSKR-500 and PSKR-501, are currently part of the Black Sea Fleet.

== Design ==
The patrol craft have a modern design and are equipped with a basic suite of armament and sensors/systems to perform the missions required of the vessels. The armament consists of a single 30 mm AK-306 which is controlled by a Kolonka ring sight fire control director, and small arms. The craft carry a navigation radar and basic communication systems. The vessels have protection against the effects of weapons of mass destruction. The vessels are equipped with 2 x 5000 hp M-533-02OMZ diesels, 2 fixed pitch propellers, this allows them to reach speeds up to 55 knots.

== See also ==
- List of ships of Russia by project number
