= Exclusive economic zone of Poland =

Maritime boundary

The Polish exclusive economic zone (Polish EEZ) has an area of 30,533 km^{2} (11,789 sq mi) within the Baltic Sea.

It includes the following bathymetric basins: Bornholm Basin (part; max. depth 95 m or 312 ft within Polish EEZ), Slupsk Furrow (entire; max. depth 93 m or 305 ft), Gotland Basin (part; max. depth 120 m or 390 ft within Polish EEZ ), and Gdansk Basin (part; max. depth 107 m or 351 ft within Polish EEZ). There are a number of shoals between the basins and the Polish coast, including Odra Bank (min. depth 4.5 m or 15 ft), Slupsk Bank (min. depth 8 m or 26 ft), Stilo Bank (min. depth 18 m or 59 ft) and Southern Middle Bank (min. depth 14 m or 46 ft).

Of the mineral resources within the Polish EEZ, the best recognized are gravel and sand deposits.

== History ==
Poland has a regulated economic zone with Sweden, Denmark and Russia. In the case of Russia, the agreement was signed by the former Soviet Union, but is recognized as Russia is the legal successor.

Poland also had a regulated economic zone with East Germany since 1989. After the reunification of Germany, the new German state recognizes the previous arrangements only as regards the state border, but does not recognize the arrangements with East Germany as regards the exclusive economic zone.

Since the 1980s until 2018, the issue of the demarcation of economic zones between Poland and Denmark remained unresolved: the dispute concerned the body of water to the south-east of Bornholm. The Polish state should apply here the provision of the Act on maritime areas of the Republic of Poland, which states that the Council of Ministers may – in the absence of international agreements – define the boundary of the exclusive economic zone by regulation. Since no such act was issued, the regulation of the Council of Ministers (of May 26, 1978) was applied in practice, defining the external borders of the Polish sea fishing zone. However, this zone is not recognized by neighboring countries. The border between the Polish and Danish EEZ was established in November 2018.

== See also ==
- Exclusive economic zone of Germany
- Exclusive economic zone of Russia
