= Okean-class patrol ship =

Russian oceanic patrol vessels

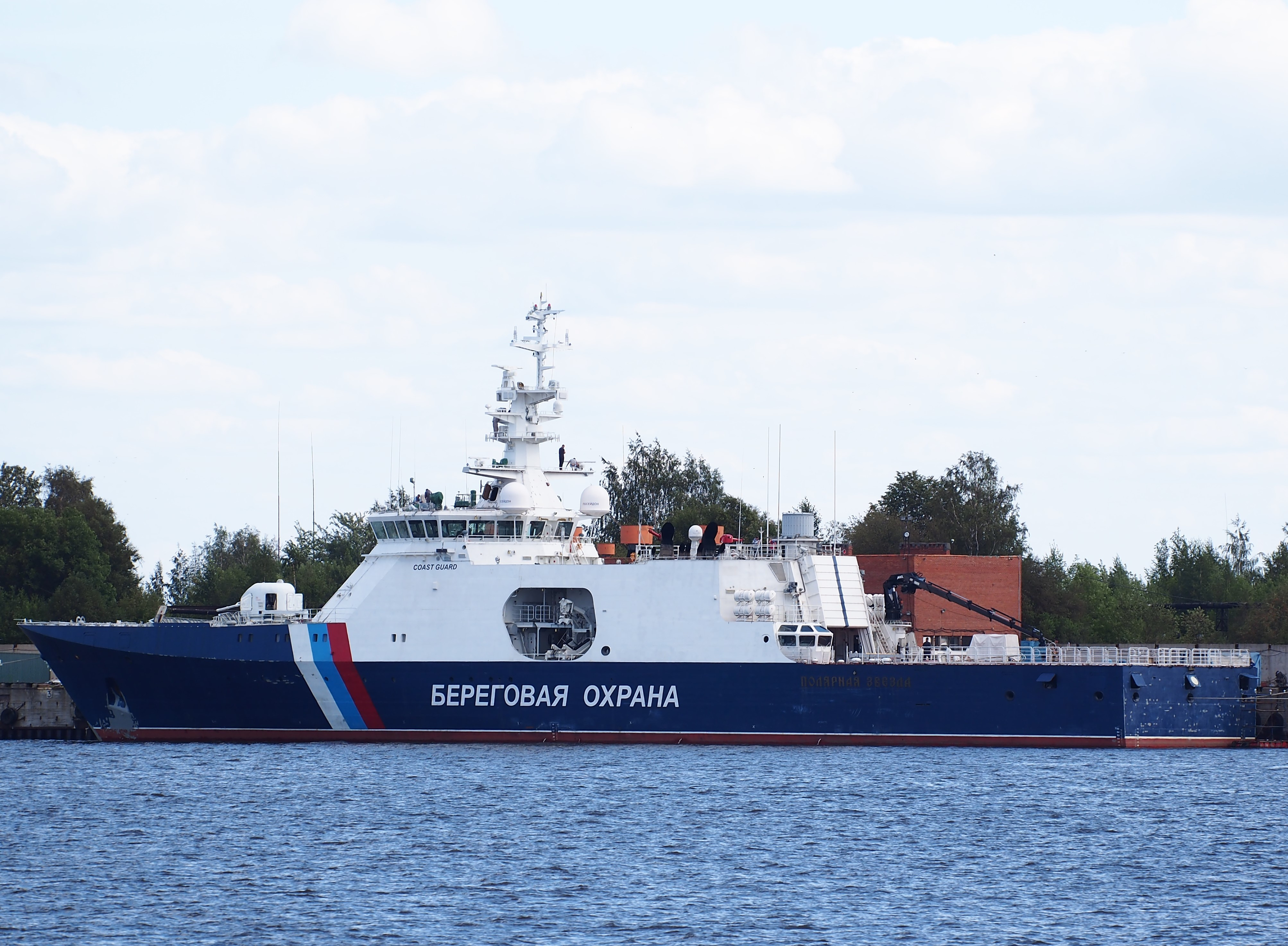
- Poljarnaya Zvezda at the Port of Kronstadt

Class overview
- Name: Okean class
- Builders: Zelenodolsk Shipyard
- Operators: Russian Coast Guard
- Preceded by: Krivak class; Ivan Susanin class
- Built: 2012–present
- In commission: 2016–present
- Planned: 5
- Completed: 3
- Active: 3

General characteristics
- Type: Patrol vessel
- Displacement: 2,700 t (2,700 long tons; 3,000 short tons)
- Length: 91.8 m (301 ft)
- Beam: 14.8 m (49 ft)
- Ice class: Russian Maritime Register of Shipping Arc4
- Propulsion: Diesel Engine (MTU (Friedrichshafen) or ZE kolomna Penza RUMO)
- Speed: Max: 21 kn (39 km/h; 24 mph)
- Range: 12,000 mi (19,000 km)
- Endurance: 60 days
- Complement: 44
- Sensors & processing systems: Buran-6M automated communications suite; Optical electronic fire control system SP-520M; Electronic management control system for main gun; Radar
- Armament: 1 × 76 mm AK-176M; 2 × 14.5 mm MTPU
- Aircraft carried: 1 × Ka-27 series helicopter
- Aviation facilities: Hangar and helipad

The Okean class, Russian designation Project 22100 Okean (ocean), is a class of oceanic patrol vessels being constructed by Zelenodolsk Shipyard for the Russian Coast Guard. The vessels of this class are intended for protection of Russia's exclusive economic zone (EEZ), providing support to combat and rescue missions, fire fighting or fisheries protection. Apart from this, the ships will be involved in ensuring actions of the FSB of Russia by fighting terrorism and piracy, goods smuggling, drug trafficking or illegal migration.

== Design ==
The project 22100 has a displacement of 2700 tons and a maximum speed up to 21 knots. The ships of the class are armed with a single AK-176M 76 mm gun on the bow, and two 14.5 mm machine guns on the sides. The 76 mm gun can be used to engage surface and airborne targets, along with the ability to engage targets on land. These multi-function vessels can also operate in arctic and non-arctic freezing areas of the Russian Federation due to their strengthened hull, what gives them some ice breaking capabilities. For airborne operations, on the stern there is a helicopter hangar and a helipad for one Ka-27 helicopter.

The ships are equipped with the latest electronic systems, including the navigational-tactical complex "Matelot-22100" developed by the JSC Kronstadt Group. The main features of the "Matelot-22100" are: an integrated bridge system, a video information display subsystem, a subsystem for processing and broadcasting of navigation information, a flight control system for deck operations, a comprehensive control system for technical equipment and an information system for the ship's central command post. Furthermore, the ships are equipped with an electronic map system NEX-4PV, designed specifically for border guards. The ships's surveillance system is explosion resistant.

== Ships ==
Italics indicate estimates

Name	Builder	Laid down	Launched	Commissioned	Fleet	Status
Poljarnaya Zvezda	Zelenodolsk Shipyard	30 May 2012	21 May 2015	17 December 2016	Northern	Active
Petropavlovsk-Kamchatsky	Zelenodolsk Shipyard	15 June 2015	1 June 2018	1 December 2019	Pacific	Active
Anadyr	Zelenodolsk Shipyard	28 April 2017	14 June 2019	16 August 2023	Northern	Active
						Planned
						Planned

== See also ==
- List of ships of Russia by project number
- Rubin-class patrol boat
- Project 22160 patrol ship
