= Neon Antonov-class logistics ship =

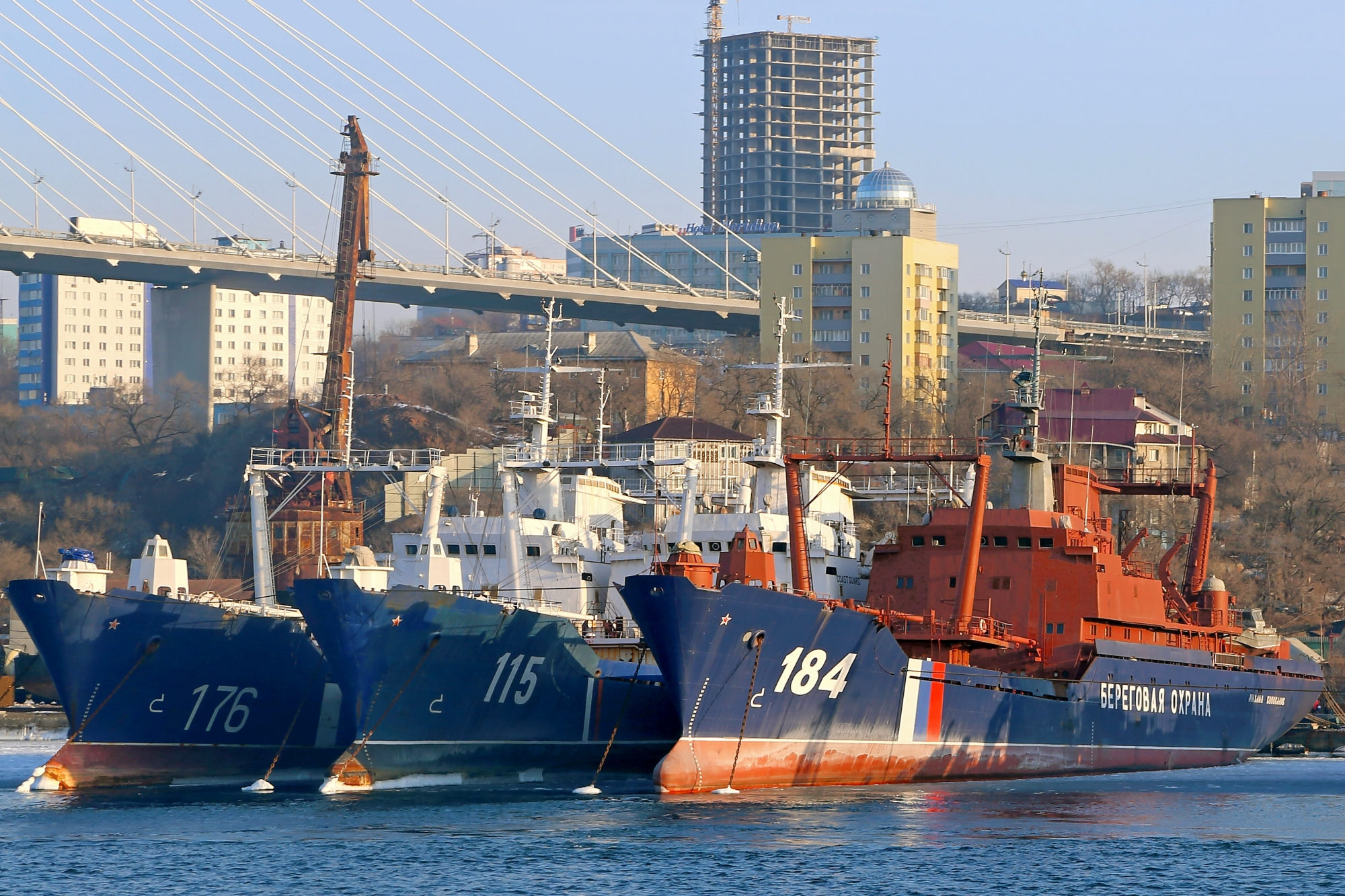
- Multiple Neon Antonov class coastal logistics ships in port

Class overview
- Name: Neon Antonov class
- Builders: Nikolaev-on-Amur Shipyard
- Operators: Russian Coast Guard
- In commission: 1976
- Active: 7

General characteristics
- Class & type: Neon Antonov class coastal logistics ship
- Displacement: 4,010 t (3,950 long tons; 4,420 short tons)
- Length: 96.3 m (316 ft)
- Beam: 14.5 m (48 ft)
- Draft: 5.1 m (17 ft)
- Speed: Max: 18 kn (33 km/h; 21 mph)
- Range: 8500 nmi (13 knots)
- Endurance: 25 days
- Complement: 45
- Sensors & processing systems: MR-220 Reyd navigation radar; Volga navigation radar; Communication system
- Armament: 1 x 30 mm AK-630; 1 x 9K34 "Strela-3" Surface to Air missile system; 2 x 12.7 mm machine guns; Small arms

The Neon Antonov-class coastal logistics ship, also known as Project 1595, is a Russian Coast Guard vessel. The vessels were designed to supply Border Guard installations in the Pacific Ocean. They can also assist in other standard Russian Coast Guard missions such as protecting Russian maritime borders, search and rescue, and maritime law enforcement.

== Design ==
The ships are small freighters that carry defensive armament to engage surface and air threats. The 30 mm gun is controlled by a Kolonka-1 ring sight fire control director. The ships have a basic suite of sensors and systems for navigation and communicating to other ships or land areas. They can carry small landing craft and one work-boat. The ships are equipped with 2 x 3750 hp 67E diesels, 2 fixed pitch propellers, 3 x 300 kW diesel generators, allowing them to reach a top speed of 18 knots. The ships usually carry roughly 940 tons of cargo.

== See also ==
- List of ships of Russia by project number
