= Sobol-class patrol boat =

Russian Coast Guard vessel

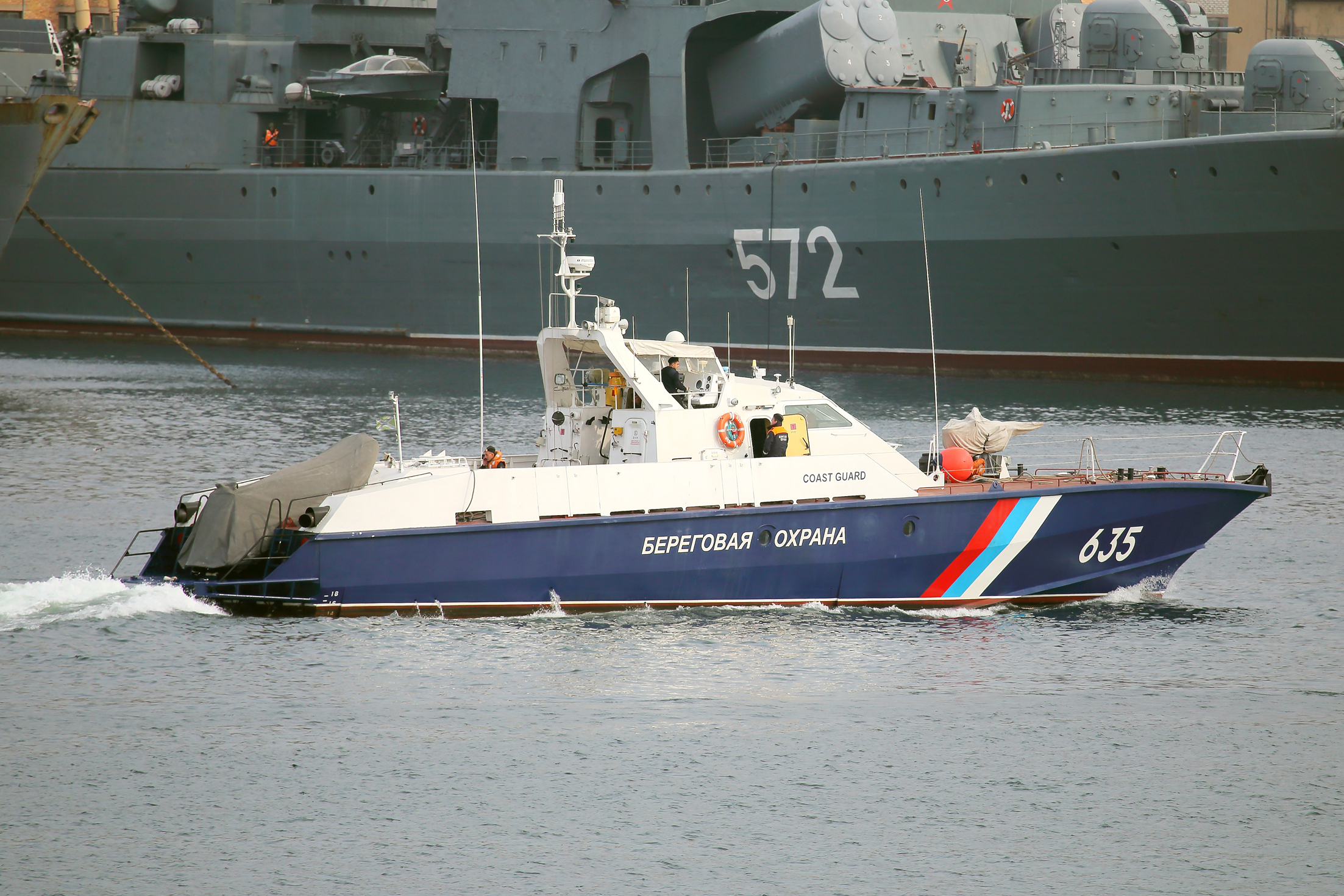
- A Sobol-class patrol boat

Class overview
- Name: Sobol class
- Builders: Vostochnaya Verf; Almaz Shipbuilding Company
- Operators: Russian Coast Guard; Turkmen Naval Forces
- In commission: 2006
- Completed: 23
- Active: 23

General characteristics
- Type: Fast patrol craft
- Displacement: 57 t (56 long tons; 63 short tons)
- Length: 30.3 m (99 ft 5 in)
- Beam: 5.82 m (19 ft 1 in)
- Draft: 1.34 m (4 ft 5 in)
- Propulsion: 2 Deutz TBD616V16 diesel
- Speed: Full: 48 knots (89 km/h; 55 mph)
- Range: 500 nmi (40 knots)
- Endurance: 3 days
- Crew: 6
- Sensors & processing systems: Liman 18M1 radar; ST50LCD navigation radar; Other communication systems
- Armament: 1 × 14.5 mm MTPU machine gun; 2 x Igla surface-to-air missile systems; 1 x 30 mm grenade launcher; Small arms

The Sobol-class patrol boat, also known as Project 12200, is a Russian Coast Guard vessel. The patrol craft is designed to operate in coastal areas, ports, and other littoral areas, to perform missions like protection of territorial maritime borders, law enforcement, other defense missions, search and rescue, and protection of fisheries.

== Design ==
The patrol craft have a modern and comfortable design. They are armed with a 14.5 mm MTPU machine gun, SAM systems, and other weapons, they can have additional armament installed if needed. The boats carry a smaller boat to perform missions such as search and rescue and boarding operations. The boats can reach high speeds, have excellent navigability and maneuverability, and a decent suite of weapons allowing them to perform required missions.

== Operators ==
- Coast Guard (Russia) - 21 boats
- Turkmen Naval Forces - 2 boats bought from Russia in December 2009.

== See also ==
- List of ships of Russia by project number
