= Rubin-class patrol boat =

Class of Russian border patrol vessels

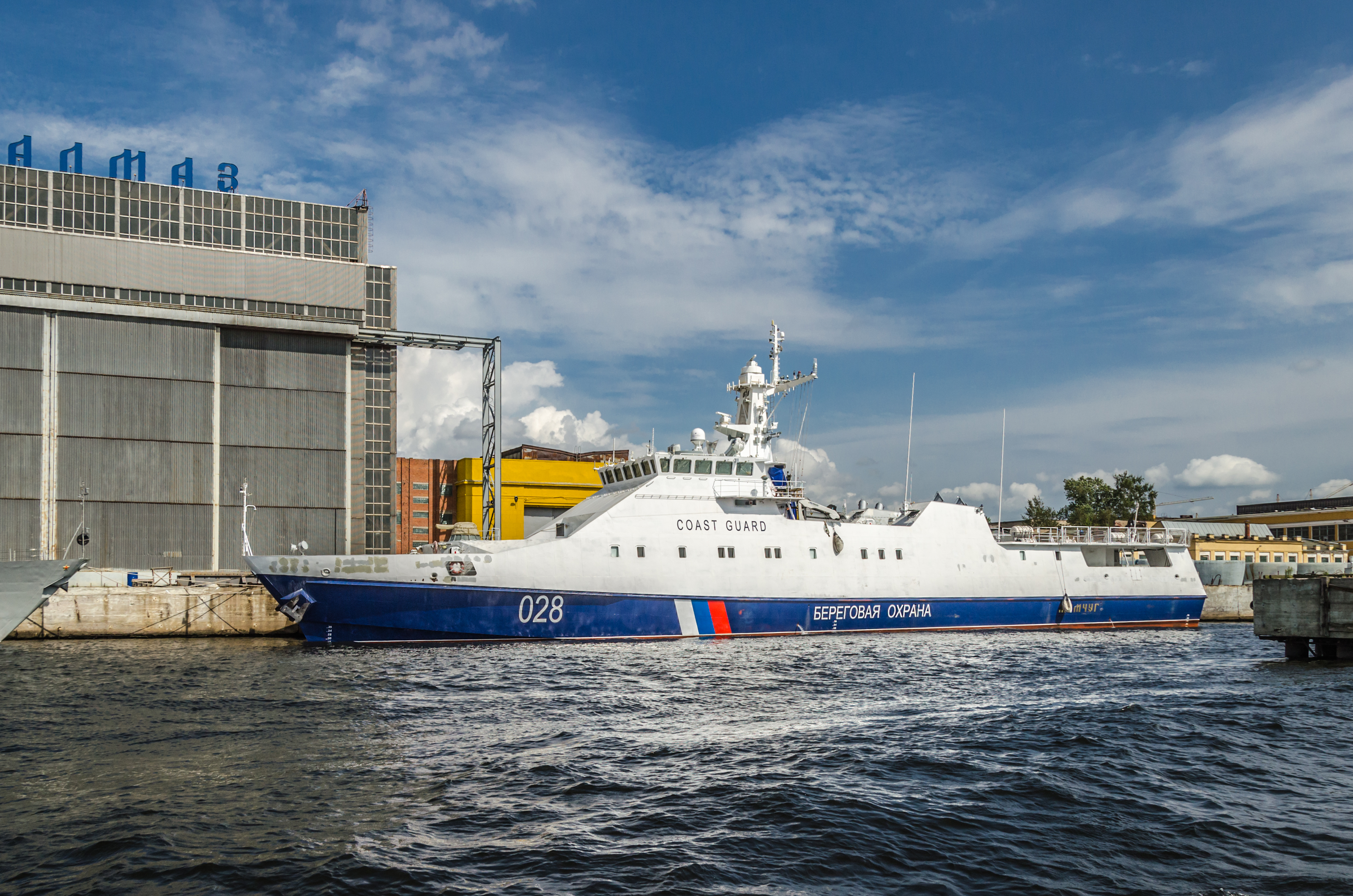
- Russian Maritime Border Guard Rubin-class patrol craft Zhemchug at the Almaz Shipbuilding Company

Class overview
- Name: Rubin class
- Builders: Almaz Shipbuilding Company; Vostochnaya Verf
- Operators: Russian Coast Guard
- Preceded by: Svetlyak class
- Built: 2007–2021
- In commission: 2009–present
- Completed: 14
- Active: 13
- Lost: 1

General characteristics
- Type: Fast patrol boat
- Displacement: 630 t (620 long tons; 690 short tons)
- Length: 62.5 m (205 ft 1 in)
- Draught: 2.2 m (7 ft 3 in)
- Propulsion: MTU 16V4000M73L, or ZE1600KZ, other ZE kolomna Penza RUMO etc diesel engines
- Speed: Full: 25 knots (46 km/h; 29 mph); Econ: 18 knots (33 km/h; 21 mph)
- Range: 3,500 mi (5,600 km) at 12 kn (22 km/h; 14 mph)
- Endurance: 30 days
- Crew: 20 crew plus up to 14 passengers
- Sensors & processing systems: Opto electronic fire control system SP-520M; Nayada navigation radar; Baltika-M radar; Sektor radio-intelligence system; Sektor ESM suite
- Armament: 1 × 30 mm gun AK-630M CIWS; 4 × Kh-35 missiles (not installed); 8 × Igla MANPADS; 2 × MTPU pedestal mount with 12.7 mm Kord machine gun; Small arms
- Aircraft carried: Ka-226 helicopter, Horizon Air S-100 UAV

The Rubin class, Russian designation Project 22460 Okhotnik (Russian: Охотник, lit. 'Hunter'), is a class of Russian border patrol vessels being constructed for the Russian Coast Guard. It is designed to combat surface and airborne targets and threats. It can also conduct patrol and convoy escort duties. It is equipped with a Horizon Air S-100, a license-built version of the Austrian Camcopter S-100 helicopter unmanned aerial vehicle, which is intended for search, detection and identification of small high-speed sea targets at a distance of 150 km (93 mi) from the carrier vessel.

== Design ==
The patrol craft have been designed with a higher degree of stealth than past Coast Guard ships. The patrol craft have a steel hull, with a double bottom and double sides to increase survivability. The patrol craft are equipped with comfortable berthing for the crew, modern architecture and other comforts like a swimming pool. The patrol craft is equipped with the Opto electronic control system SP-520M, which functions as a fire control system for the main gun and can search and track targets during the day or at night and is equipped with a laser rangefinder, the patrol craft is also equipped with the navigational and tactical complex "TRIMS-22460". The patrol crafts armament gives them anti-surface and air defense capability, in the event of wartime mobilization the craft can be up-armed with anti-ship missiles.

The ships are degaussed. The ships have a flight deck and hangar for a helicopter or UAV, there is also a stern launching ramp for a small boat. The patrol craft can also carry a 57mm A-220M gun mount instead of AK-630 on the bow.

== Ships ==
Italics indicate estimates

Name	Builders	Laid down	Launched	Commissioned	Fleet	Status
Rubin	Almaz Shipbuilding Company	3 September 2007	26 June 2009	13 November 2009	Black Sea	Active
Brilliant	Almaz Shipbuilding Company	12 May 2010	25 November 2011	26 June 2012	Caspian	Active
Zhemchug	Almaz Shipbuilding Company	22 December 2010	21 April 2012	21 September 2012	Black Sea	Active
Sapfir	Vostochnaya Verf, Vladivostok	May 2012	6 August 2014	28 May 2015	Pacific	Active
Izumrud	Almaz Shipbuilding Company	21 September 2012	14 August 2013	27 July 2014	Black Sea	Sunk by a Sargan-3000 drone in the harbor of Gelendzhik.
Ametist	Almaz Shipbuilding Company	2012	24 March 2014	3 October 2014	Black Sea	Active
Korall	Vostochnaya Verf, Vladivostok	November 2013	6 July 2015	25 January 2016	Pacific	Active
Provorny	Almaz Shipbuilding Company	27 June 2014	6 May 2016	11 November 2016	Black Sea	Active
Nadejny	Almaz Shipbuilding Company	27 June 2014	26 May 2016	10 December 2016	Baltic Fleet	Active
Predanny	Almaz Shipbuilding Company	winter 2014	7 April 2017	15 September 2017	Northern Fleet	Active
Dozornyy	Vostochnaya Verf, Vladivostok	30 December 2014	22 August 2017	21 June 2018	Pacific	Active
Bditelny	Almaz Shipbuilding Company	2015	21 April 2017	13 October 2017	Northern	Active
Bezuprechny	Almaz Shipbuilding Company	24 May 2017	18 April 2018	10 October 2018	Black Sea	Active
Rasul Gamzatov	Almaz Shipbuilding Company	9 September 2018	21 December 2019	30 November 2021	Black Sea (as of July 2022)	Active

== See also ==
- List of ships of the Soviet Navy
- List of ships of Russia by project number
- Okean-class patrol ship
- Project 22160 patrol ship
- Buyan-class corvette
