= Vosh-class river patrol craft =

Class of modern river gunboat in the Soviet & Russian Navies

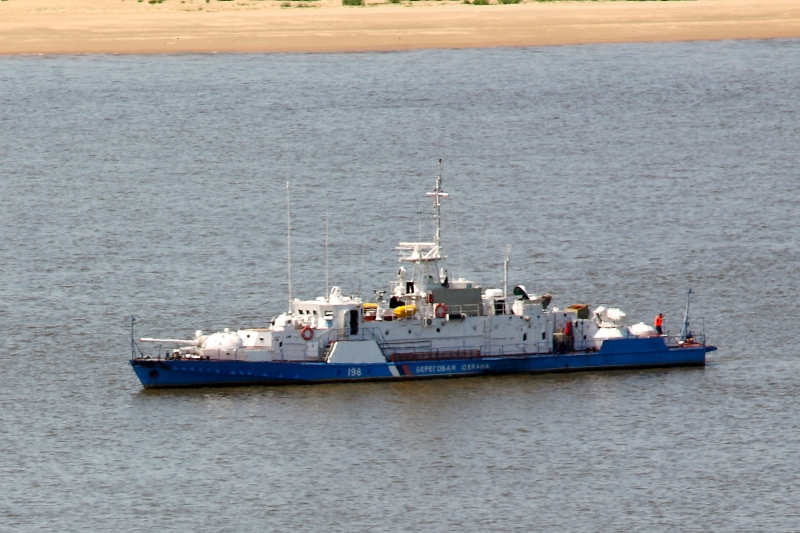
- A Vosh-class river patrol vessel underway

Class overview
- Name: Vosh class
- Builders: Sretensk Shipyard
- Operators: Soviet Border Troops (former); Soviet Navy (former); Russian Navy (former); Russian Coast Guard
- In commission: 1979
- Active: 18

General characteristics
- Type: River patrol craft
- Displacement: 213.7 t (210.3 long tons; 235.6 short tons)
- Length: 38.91 m (127.7 ft)
- Beam: 6.1 m (20 ft)
- Draft: 1.22 m (4.0 ft)
- Speed: Max: 17.5 kn (32.4 km/h; 20.1 mph)
- Range: 500 nmi (10 knots)
- Endurance: 7 days
- Complement: 21
- Sensors & processing systems: Mius navigational radar; Communication systems
- Armament: T-55 tank turret; 1 x 100 mm D-10-T2s tank gun; 1 x coaxial 7.62 mm PKT machine gun; 1 x 30 mm AK-306 CIWS; 1 x twin 12.7 mm Utyos-M machine gun turret; 1 x 30 mm AGS-17M grenade launcher; 1 x 140 mm A-223 Sneg rocket launcher; 1 x 9K32M Strela-2M MANPADS; Small arms
- Armor: 100–200 mm armor over vital areas

The Vosh-class river patrol craft, also known in Soviet designation as Project 1248 Moskit, which has the Project 12481 variant. Both are Russian Coast Guard vessels. The patrol craft is designed to operate in rivers and protect/secure Russian maritime borders, enforce navigational rules and other laws, search and rescue. They work alongside other patrol craft of the Russian Coast Guard and Navy, such as the Piyavka-class and Ogonek-class river patrol crafts.

== Design ==
The patrol craft have a relatively simple design, but one similar to a scaled-down version of the Yaz class. The heavy armament installed on them allows them to engage surface, ground, and air threats. They can stay on the water for 7 days and are powered by diesel engines. The crafts basic suite of sensors and systems for navigation and communication allows them to perform the required missions.

== See also ==
- List of ships of Russia by project number
