= Peanut Hole =

International zone of the Sea of Okhotsk

Coordinates: 55°30′N 149°30′E

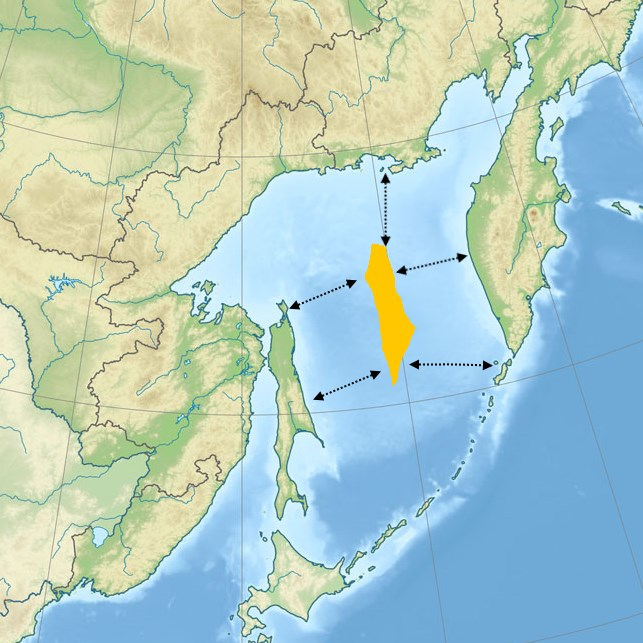
Approximate location and size of the Peanut Hole

The International zone of the Sea of Okhotsk (Russian: международная зона Охотского моря, romanized: mezhdunarodnaya zona Okhotskogo morya), known by its nickname the Peanut Hole, is an area of international waters at the center of the Sea of Okhotsk. From 1991 to 2014, its status was the subject of international disputes. Since March 2014, the Peanut Hole's seabed and subterranea are legally part of the continental shelf of Russia.

The Peanut Hole (named for its arachidic shape) (Note: Goltz, p. 445.) is an area about 55 kilometres (34 miles) wide and 480 kilometres (300 miles) long, surrounded by the exclusive economic zone of Russia (EEZ), extending from the shores of the Kamchatka Peninsula, the Kuril Islands, Sakhalin, and the Russian mainland (Khabarovsk Krai and Magadan Oblast), but not within Russia's EEZ, because it is more than 200 nautical miles (370 km) from any coast, the latter being part of the official definition of the EEZ, Article 57 of the United Nations Convention on the Law of the Sea.

EEZs are not areas of sovereignty but rather areas of certain sovereign rights and functional jurisdiction. Since the Peanut Hole is not within the Russian EEZ, any country could fish there, and some began doing so in large numbers in 1991, removing perhaps as much as one million metric tons of pollock by 1992. This was seen by the Russian Federation as presenting a danger to Russian fish stocks, since the fish move in and out of the Peanut Hole from the Russian EEZ. This situation is called a "straddling stock", and the problem with it is an illustration of the "tragedy of the commons".

[T]hirty-nine Polish supertrawlers burst into the central part of the Sea of Okhotsk... followed by nine large South Korean trawlers and almost the entire Chinese fishing fleet. Somewhat later, fishing ships from Japan, Panama, Bulgaria and Ukraine appeared. A wild revelry began... Reluctant to observe elementary international fishing regulations, foreign fishermen set to clearing out the wealth of the northern sea.

— Yelena Matveyeva, On the Brink of a Military Conflict in the Sea of Okhotsk, Moscow News Weekly

In 1993, China, Japan, Poland, Russia, and South Korea agreed to stop fishing in the Peanut Hole until pollock stocks recovered, but without an agreement on how to proceed subsequently. The United Nations Straddling Fish Stocks Agreement, which became effective in 2001, created a framework intended to help implement cooperative management of straddling stocks.

The Russian Federation petitioned the United Nations to declare the Peanut Hole part of Russia's continental shelf. In November 2013, a UN subcommittee accepted the Russian argument, and in March 2014, the full United Nations Commission on the Limits of the Continental Shelf ruled in favor of the Russian Federation.

There are several other similar, relatively small areas in the high seas, surrounded by EEZs: "Banana Hole" in the Norwegian Sea, surrounded by the EEZs of Norway, Greenland, the Faroe Islands, and Iceland; "Loop Hole" in the Barents Sea, surrounded by Russia and Norway; and the "Donut Hole" in the Bering Sea, surrounded by Russia and the United States.
