= Piyavka-class river patrol craft =

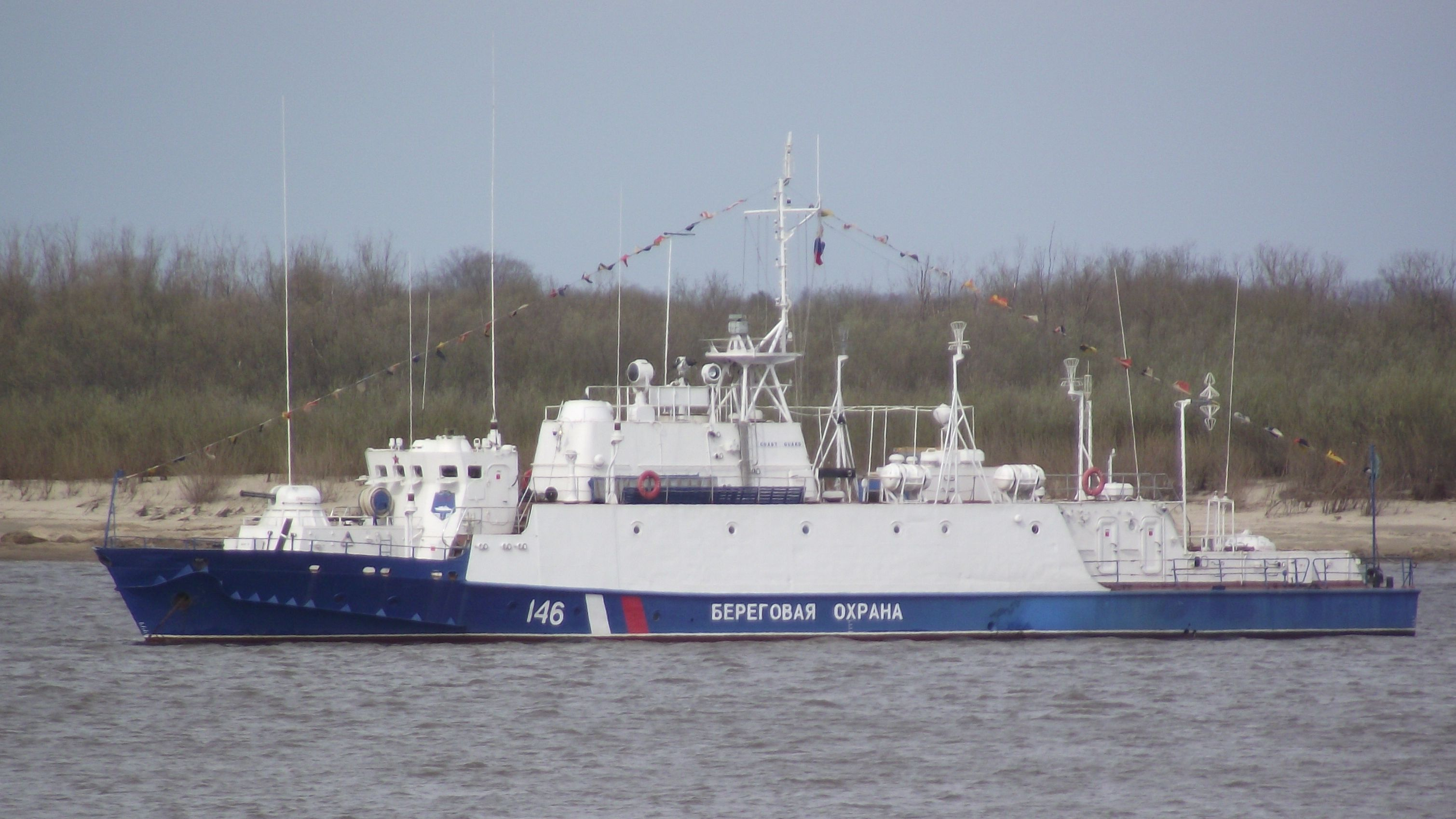
- Piyavka-class river patrol craft

Class overview
- Name: Piyavka class
- Builders: Khabarovsk Shipyard
- Operators: Soviet Border Troops (former); Russian Coast Guard
- In commission: 1979
- Active: 8

General characteristics
- Type: River patrol craft
- Displacement: 225 t (221 long tons; 248 short tons)
- Length: 42.9 m (141 ft)
- Beam: 6.1 m (20 ft)
- Draft: 1.3 m (4.3 ft)
- Speed: Max: 17.4 kn (32.2 km/h; 20.0 mph)
- Range: 500 nmi (10 knots)
- Endurance: 7 days
- Complement: 28
- Sensors & processing systems: Mius navigational radar; Other communication systems
- Armament: 1 x 30 mm AK-306 CIWS; 1 x 30 mm AGS-17M Plamya grenade launcher; 1 x 9K32M Strela-2M MANPADS; Small arms

The Piyavka-class river patrol boat, also known as Project 1249, is a Russian Coast Guard vessel. The patrol craft is designed to operate in rivers to secure and protect Russian maritime borders, enforce navigational laws and other law enforcement duties, and search and rescue. The patrol craft work alongside other Russian Coast Guard and Navy vessels, such as the Vosh-class and Ogonek-class river patrol crafts. Its hull is not capable of breaking through heavy ice during the winter season.

== Design ==
The patrol craft have a basic design and are powered by diesel engines. The weapon suite allows the craft to engage surface, ground, and air threats and targets, the suite also gives them a good self-defense capability. The vessels basic suite of sensors and systems for navigation and communication allows the vessels to perform the required missions.

== See also ==
- List of ships of Russia by project number
