= Komandor-class patrol vessel =

Russian Coast Guard vessel

Class overview
- Name: Komandor class
- Builders: Danyard Shipyard
- Operators: Russian Coast Guard
- In commission: 1989
- Completed: 4
- Active: 4

General characteristics
- Type: Offshore Patrol Vessel
- Displacement: 2.019 t (1.987 long tons; 2.226 short tons)
- Length: 88.97 m (291.9 ft)
- Beam: 13.6 m (45 ft)
- Draft: 4.7 m (15 ft)
- Speed: Max: 192 kn (356 km/h; 221 mph)
- Range: 7000 nmi (19 knots)
- Endurance: 15 days
- Complement: 42
- Sensors & processing systems: Nayada-5 navigation radar; Furuno FR-2030S; Navigational radar; Other navigation and communication systems
- Armament: 1 × Ka-32 helicopter; 2 × 12,7 mm 6P58 Kord mascina gun

The Komandor-class patrol vessel, also known as Project 850285, is a Russian Coast Guard vessel.

The patrol ship class were designed to operate in coastal and other littoral areas, performing missions like protection of territorial maritime borders, law enforcement, counter-terrorism, detection and intercept smugglers, search and rescue, and protection of fisheries.

The ships are currently used in patrols for Sea of Okhotsk and the Pacific Ocean.

Originally were acquired by the Soviet Union for fisheries protection duties; while the ships were inherited by Russia and in 1998 were transferred to the Russian Coast Guard.

The four ships were built in the Danyard Shipyard, Frederikshavn, Denmark.

Komandor-class patrol ships
Name	Yard №	Commissioned	Notes
Komandor	01695	01.09.1989	
Shkiper Gek	01696	20.12.1989	
Herluf Bidstrup	01697	09.02.1990	
Manchzhur	01698	06.07.1990	
