= Mustang 2-class patrol boat =

Class overview
- Name: Mustang 2-class
- Builders: Yaroslavsky shipyard
- Operators: Russian Coast Guard
- In commission: 1999
- Completed: 4
- Active: 3

General characteristics
- Type: Fast patrol craft
- Displacement: 35.5 t (34.9 long tons; 39.1 short tons)
- Length: 20 m (66 ft)
- Beam: 4.5 m (15 ft)
- Draft: 1.1 m (3.6 ft)
- Speed: Full: 45 kn (83 km/h; 52 mph)
- Range: 310 nmi (40 knots)
- Endurance: 4 days
- Crew: 10
- Sensors & processing systems: Gals navigational radar; Other communication systems
- Armament: 1 × 14.5 mm machine gun; 1 × 30 mm AGS-17 grenade launcher; 1 × 7.62 mm machine gun (PSKA-816 only); Small arms

The Mustang 2-class patrol boat, also known as Project 18623, is a Russian Coast Guard vessel. It was originally designed to be operated by the Ministry of Fisheries, but those duties were transferred to the Coast Guard in 1998. The boats are used for general border protection and fisheries duties.

== Design ==
Designed by the Redan Bureau, the craft are constructed with an aluminum hull and superstructure and can operate in sea states up to 5. They are equipped with 2 Zvezda M-470 diesel engines, and with weapons to engage surface targets.

== Vessels ==
PSKA-816 and 818 are part of the Caspian Flotilla, while PSKA-817 is a part of the Baltic Fleet. The 4th boat, Sokol, was designated as a communications boat.

== See also ==
- List of ships of Russia by project number
