= Exclusive economic zone of Russia =

The Russian Federation has the fourth-largest exclusive economic zone of 7,566,673 km^{2} (2,921,509 sq mi) with 200 nautical miles (370.4 km; 230.2 mi) from its shores.

== Geography ==
Russia's exclusive economic zone

The EEZ borders with Norway, Finland, Sweden, Estonia, Lithuania and Poland to the west, the United States to the east, Japan, North Korea and South Korea to the south east and Azerbaijan, Kazakhstan, Georgia, Turkey and Ukraine to the south.

The EEZ of Russia
Territory	EEZ Area (km^{2})	EEZ Area (sq mi)	Notes
Kaliningrad (Baltic Sea)	11,634	4,492	
Saint Petersburg (Baltic Sea)	12,759	4,926	
Barents Sea	1,308,140	505,080	
Black Sea (without the Crimean EEZ)	66,854	25,812	
Pacific Ocean	3,419,202	1,320,161	
Siberia	3,277,292	1,265,370	
Total	7,566,673	4,701,712	

== Disputes ==
=== Active ===
==== Japan ====
There is a longstanding dispute with Japan over the southern part of the Kuril islands. The dispute dates back to the Soviet Union and the Yalta Agreement (February 1945). As of 1999 the United States maintained that until a peace treaty between Japan and Russia is concluded, the disputed Northern Territories remain under Russian control via General Order No. 1. In 2014 Marie Harf, a U.S. State Department spokeswoman stated that the United States recognizes Japan's sovereignty over the islands.

=== Resolved ===
==== Norway ====
- In 2010, the Norway and Russia dispute of both territorial sea and EEZ with regard to the Svalbard archipelago as it affects Russia's EEZ due to its unique treaty status was resolved. A treaty was agreed in principle in April 2010 between the two states and subsequently officially ratified, resolving this demarcation dispute. The agreement was signed in Murmansk on 15 September 2010.

== See also ==
- Geography of Russia
- Exclusive economic zone of Japan
- Exclusive economic zone of Poland
- Peanut Hole
