= Ogonek-class river patrol craft =

Russian Coast Guard vessel

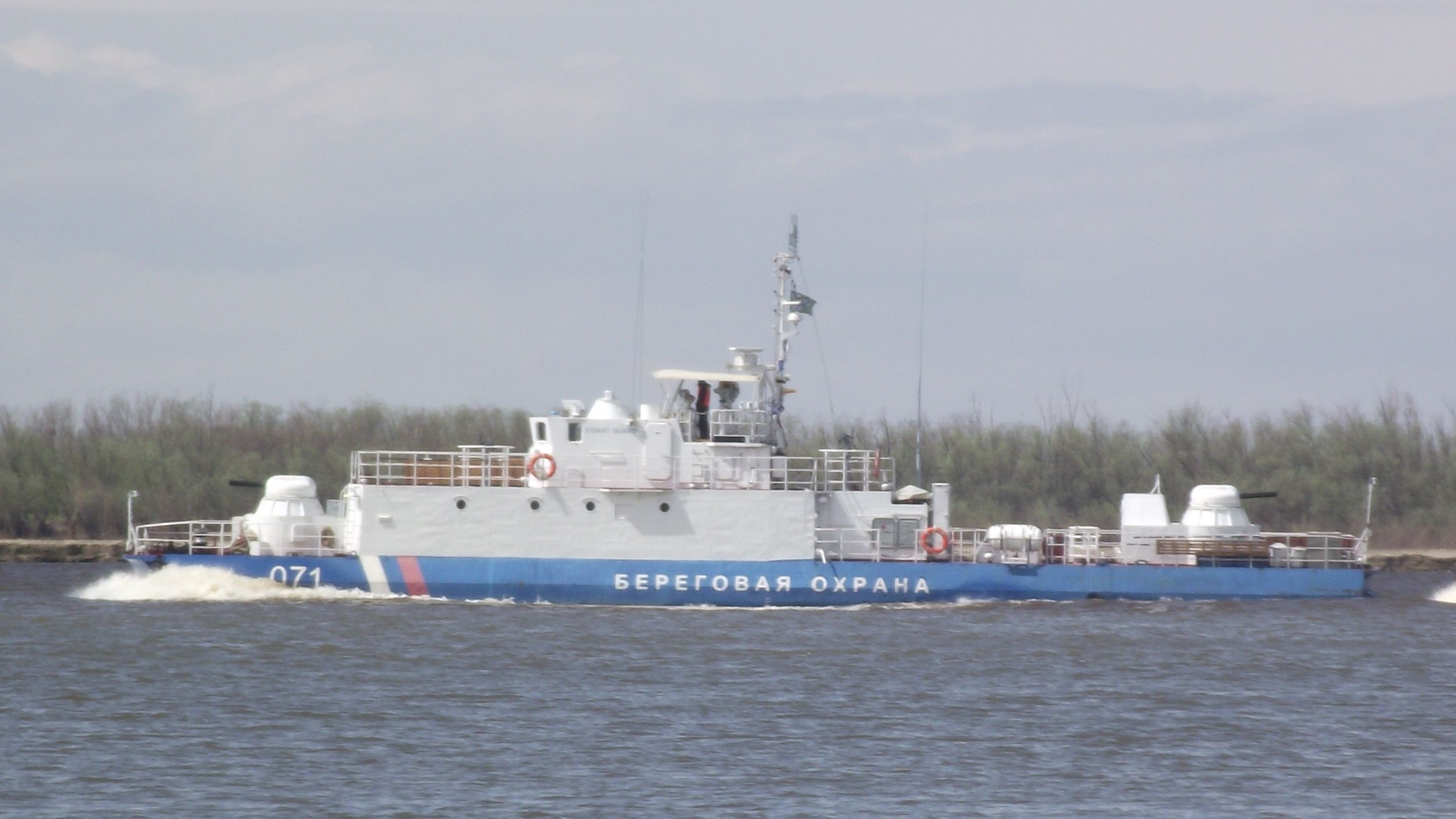
- The Ogonek-class river patrol craft Admiral Kazakevich (ex-PSKR-200) underway

Class overview
- Name: Ogonek class
- Builders: Khabarovsk Shipyard
- Operators: Russian Coast Guard
- In commission: 1998
- Completed: 4
- Active: 4

General characteristics
- Type: River patrol craft/river gunboat
- Displacement: 98 t (96 long tons; 108 short tons)
- Length: 33.4 m (109 ft 7 in)
- Beam: 4.2 m (13 ft 9 in)
- Draft: 0.81 m (2 ft 8 in)
- Speed: Max: 25 kn (46 km/h; 29 mph)
- Range: 270 nmi (500 km; 310 mi) at 20 kn (37 km/h; 23 mph)
- Complement: 17
- Sensors & processing systems: Liman navigational radar; Communication systems
- Armament: 2 × 30 mm AK-306 CIWS, or 1 × 30 mm AK-306 CIWS and 1 × twin 12.7 mm Utyos-M machine gun turret (PSKR-201, PSKR-202); 1 × 7.62 mm machine gun; Igla MANPADS; Various onboard small arms

The Ogonek-class river patrol craft, also known as Project 12130 Ogonyok river gunboat, is a Russian Coast Guard vessel. The patrol craft is designed to operate in rivers and perform various missions of the Russian Coast Guard like protecting Russian maritime borders, law enforcement, enforcement of navigation rules, search and rescue, and fisheries protection. These vessels work alongside other classes of Russian Coast Guard vessels, such as the Vosh-class and Piyavka-class river patrol crafts.

== Design ==
The patrol craft are designed similar to other Russian river patrol vessels. In terms of armament, PSKR-201 and PSKR-202 are only equipped with one 30 mm CIWS instead of two and carry a twin 12.7 mm machine gun turret; all of the vessels have MANPADS and a 7.62 mm machine gun. The suite of armaments they are equipped with allows the craft to engage surface, air, and ground threats and targets. The vessels are equipped with a simple navigational radar and communication systems. The vessels are equipped with 2 × 1100 hp M401B diesel engines, two fixed pitch propellers, 2 × 30 kW diesel generators; this gives them a top speed of about 25 knots.

== See also ==
- List of ships of Russia by project number
