= NSV machine gun =

NSV
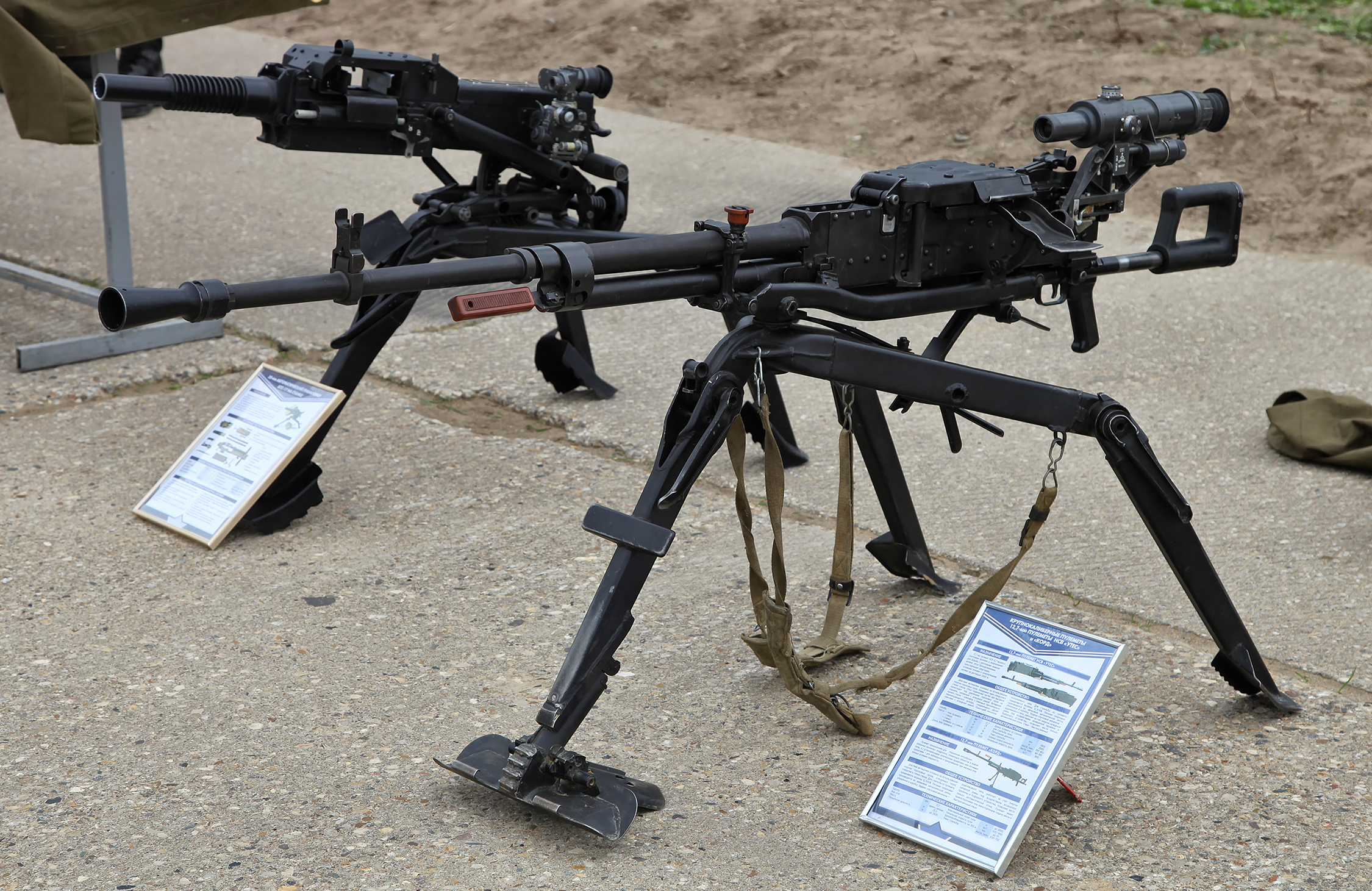
- NSV heavy machine gun
- Type: Heavy machine gun
- Place of origin: Soviet Union

Service history
- In service: 1971–present
- Used by: See Users
- Wars: Soviet–Afghan War; First Nagorno-Karabakh War; Gulf War; Afghan Civil War; War in Afghanistan; Lebanese Civil War; Iraq War; Russo-Georgian War; Syrian Civil War; Iraqi Civil War (2014–2017); Russo-Ukrainian War; Yemeni Civil War (2015–present); Russo-Ukrainian war

Production history
- Designer: G.I. Nikitin, Y.М. Sokolov, V.I. Volkov
- Designed: Central Design Bureau of Sports and Hunting Weaponry, Tula, 1969
- Manufacturer: West-Kazakhstan machine building company JSC (ZKMK)
- Produced: 1971–present
- Variants: NSVT

Specifications
- Mass: 25 kg (55.12 lb) (gun only); 41 kg (90.39 lb) on tripod 11 kg (24.25 lb) (50-round belt)
- Length: 1,560 mm (61.4 in)
- Cartridge: 12.7×108mm 12.7×99mm NATO (For Polish WKM-B)
- Caliber: 12.7 mm
- Action: Gas-operated
- Rate of fire: 700–800 rounds/min
- Muzzle velocity: 845 m/s (2,772 ft/s)
- Effective firing range: 1500 m vs. air (maximum); 2000 m vs. ground targets
- Feed system: 50-round belt
- Sights: Iron sights

The NSV Utyos (Cyrillic: НСВ, initialism for Никитин-Соколов-Волков, Nikitin-Sokolov-Volkov; Russian: Утёс, lit. 'Cliff'), is a Soviet heavy machine gun chambered in 12.7×108mm. It is named after the designers, G. I. Nikitin, Y. М. Sokolov and V. I. Volkov. It was designed to replace the DShK machine gun and was adopted by the Soviet Army in 1971.

The NSV was manufactured at the Metallist plant in Uralsk, Kazakh SSR, Soviet Union. The vehicle-mounted NSVT variant is used on the T-72, T-64 and T-80 main battle tanks. Like many Soviet weapons, the NSV was also licence produced by Yugoslavia as the M87. Following the break-up of the Soviet Union, Russia began development on the Kord heavy machine gun, while Belarus, Poland, Bulgaria, Ukraine and Vietnam all introduced their own copies of the NSV.

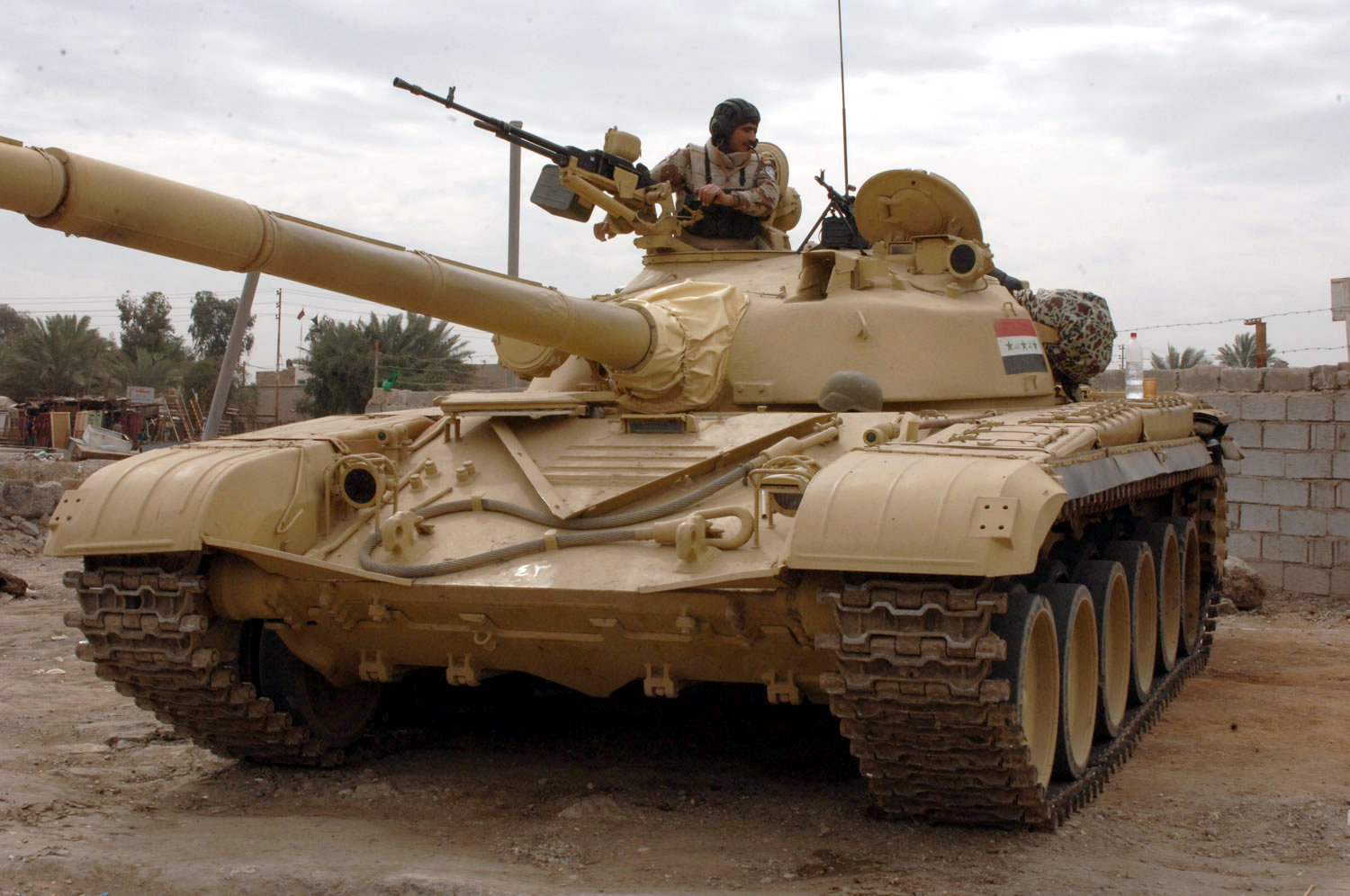
NSVT machine gun mounted on an Iraqi T-72 tank

The NSV weighs 25 kg (55 lb), has a rate of fire of 700–800 rounds per minute, and an effective range from 1,500 m (1,600 yd) to 2,000 m (2,200 yd) against airborne and ground targets, respectively. A loaded ammunition belt with 50 rounds weighs 11 kg (24 lb).

== History ==
The Soviet Army began looking for a new heavy machine gun to replace its older SGM and DShK machine guns in the early 1950s. The Soviet Army liked the idea behind the German MG 42: a versatile weapon used on a variety of mounts to perform many different roles. Two Soviet weapon designers were asked to design one weapon each utilizing the same principle. Mikhail Kalashnikov's submission was approved following trials as it was found to be more reliable and cheaper to manufacture than the design of Grigory Nikitin and Yuri Sokolov. Kalashnikov's machine gun became the new standard machine gun, and was named PK.

Nikitin's and Sokolov's design was, however, not forgotten. It was eventually developed into the NSV heavy machine gun about 10 years later and selected in 1969 as the successor to the DShK and DShKM machine guns. It was accepted in service by the Soviet Army in 1971.

Following the break-up of the Soviet Union, Russia began developing the Kord heavy machine gun to replace the NSV "Utyos" and which entered service in 1998. The Metallist factory in what is now Oral, Kazakhstan struggled to find customers in the 1990s. The factory was converted to focus on industrial production in the oil and gas sector in 2003.

== Use in Finland ==
The NSV is called 12,7 Itkk 96 or 12,7 ilmatorjuntakonekivääri 96 ('12.7 anti-aircraft machine gun 96') in Finland. It is often used as a vehicle-mounted machine gun, and can be seen on the Pasi armoured personnel carrier, the Nasu transport vehicle and the Leopard 2R tank.

Due to its high rate of fire, the NSV is intended to be used as a close-range anti-aircraft weapon against helicopters, UAVs and aircraft. In dismounted ground combat it is placed on a special mount.

The Finnish Navy also uses the NSV in the anti-aircraft role, where it complements other unguided anti-aircraft weapons like the 23 ITK 95, Bofors 40 Mk 3 or Bofors 57 Mk 2 and Mk 3.

== Variants ==
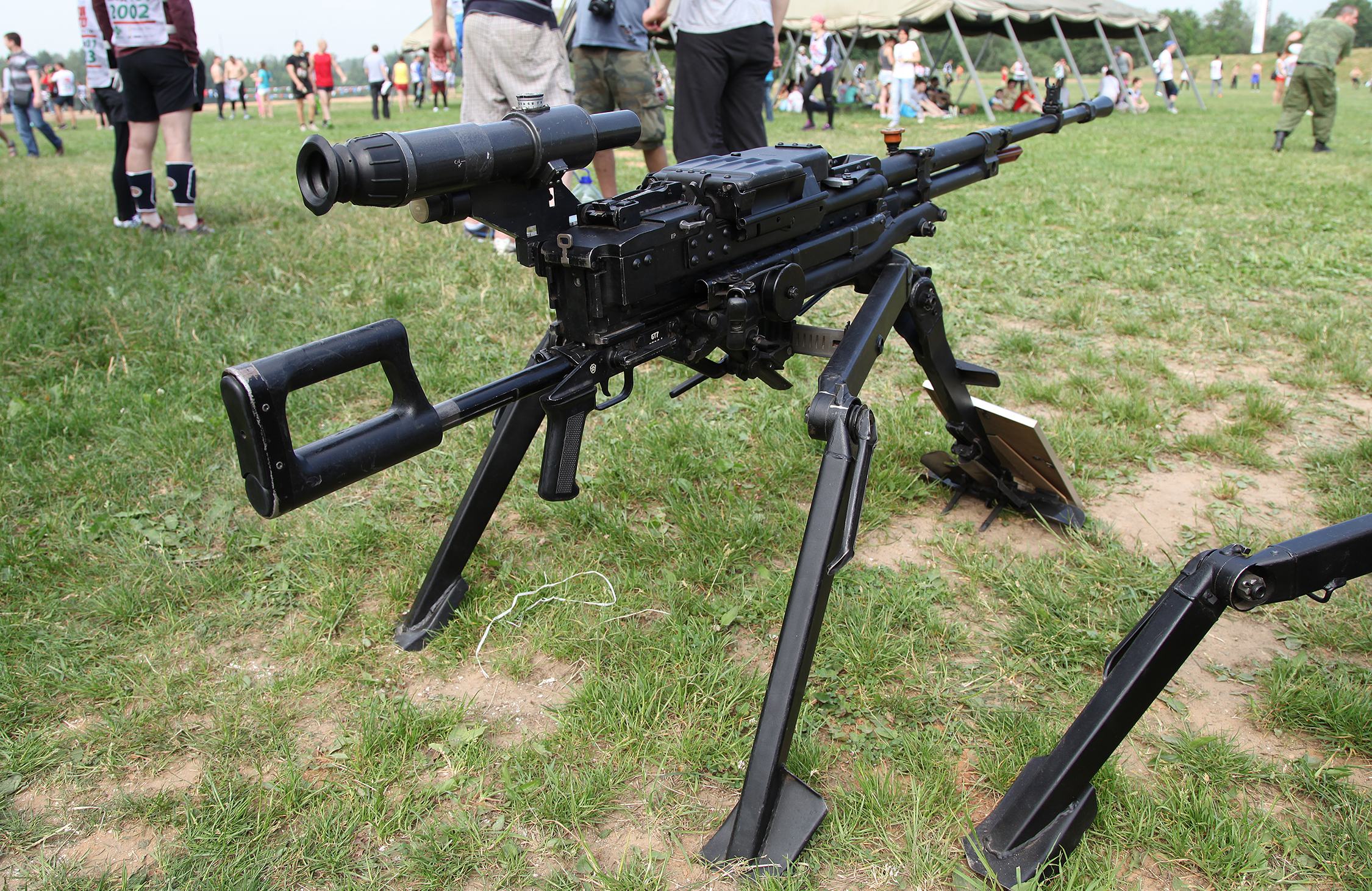
NSV machine gun on mount

- NSV-12.7: Baseline variant, currently produced by West-Kazakhstan machine building company JSC (ZKMK). Available in both 12.7×108mm and .50 BMG (12.7×99mm NATO).
- NSVS-12.7 (Russian: Никитина-Соколова-Волкова станковый — 12,7, romanized: Nikitina-Sokolova-Volkova Stankovy – 12.7, lit. 'NSV-designed 12.7 mm mounted machine gun'): Used on tripod mount.
- NSVT-12.7 (Russian: Никитина-Соколова-Волкова танковый — 12,7, romanized: Nikitina-Sokolova-Volkova Tankovy – 12.7, lit. 'NSV-designed 12.7 mm tank-mounted machine gun'): Used as a vehicle-mounted machine gun for tanks and other armoured fighting vehicles.

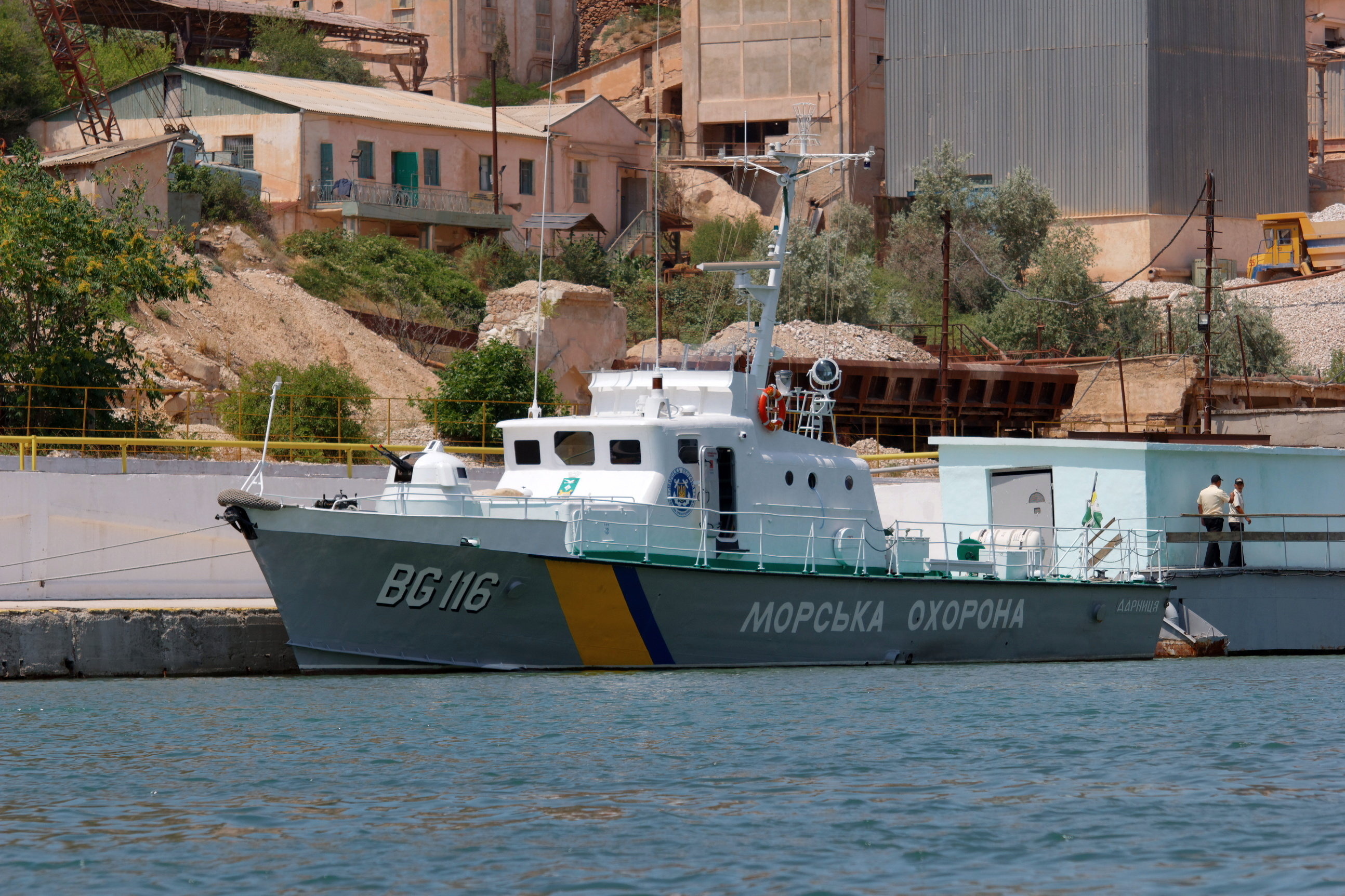
The Utyos-M machine gun turret mounted on the Ukrainian Sea Guard Zhuk-class patrol boat Darnytsia (BG116)

- Utyos-M: Naval twin 12.7 mm machine gun turret (2 × NSV-12.7s; 10 × 100-round belts) used on the Zhuk, Yaz, Vosh, Ogonek classes, etc.
- 12.7 Itkk 96: Finnish designation. Guns acquired from Soviet Union, Russia and Germany (ex-Nationale Volksarmee).
- M87 NSVT: Serbian license built version by Zastava Arms. The M87 has seen use with the armies of the former Yugoslav states. Available in both 12.7×108mm and .50 BMG.
- NSW: Polish copy.
- WKM-B: Polish copy adapted for NATO-standard .50 BMG ammunition.
- KT-12.7: Ukrainian copy.
- MG-U: Bulgarian copy.
- SCX-12,7V: Vietnamese development with DShK-style butterfly trigger, mount, sight, shoulder rest, and a modern Picatinny rail.

== Users ==
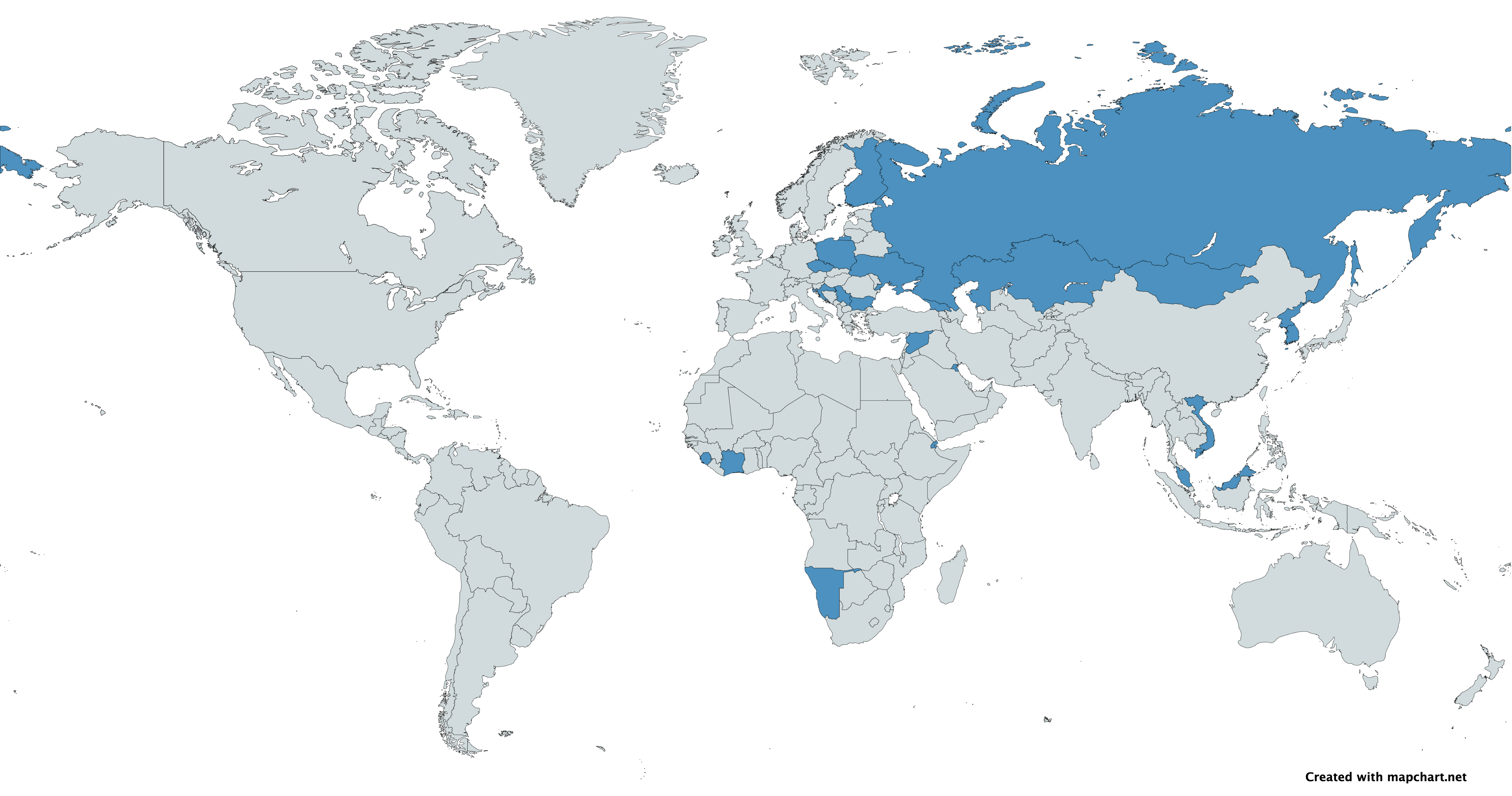
Map with NSV machine gun users in blue

=== Current users ===
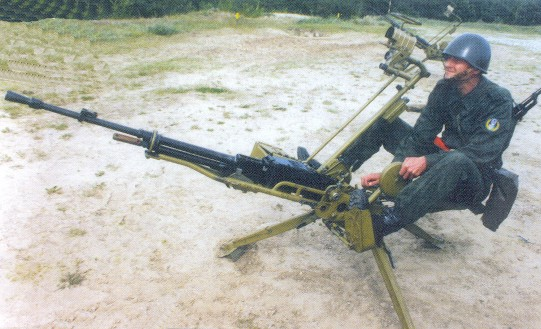
Polish NSW on an anti-aircraft mount

- Armenia
- Azerbaijan
- Belarus
- Bulgaria: Produced by Arsenal.
- Croatia
- Czech Republic
- Djibouti
- Eritrea
- Estonia
- Finland
- Georgia
- India
- Ivory Coast
- Kazakhstan: Locally produced by West-Kazakhstan machine building company JSC (ZKMK).
- Kuwait: Mounted and used on M-84 tanks.
- Kyrgyzstan
- Latvia
- Lithuania
- Moldova
- Mongolia
- Montenegro
- Namibia: Used by Namibian Marine Corps.
- North Korea
- North Macedonia
- Poland: Manufactured at ZM Tarnów as NSW. Poland also developed their own machine gun based on NSV and chambered to .50 BMG NATO round, known as WKM-B.
- Russian Federation
- Serbia: Manufactured at Zastava Arms. Copies were produced as the M02 Coyote.
- Sierra Leone
- Slovakia
- South Korea: Mounted and used on T-80U tanks.
- Syria
- Tajikistan
- Turkmenistan
- Ukraine
- Uzbekistan
- Vietnam: Reverse-engineered copy produced by Z111 Factory. Built with DShK-style butterfly trigger and shoulder stock while retaining other majority properties of the NSV.

=== Former users ===
- Soviet Union
- Yugoslavia

== See also ==
- List of firearms
- List of Russian weaponry
