= Kigoriak =

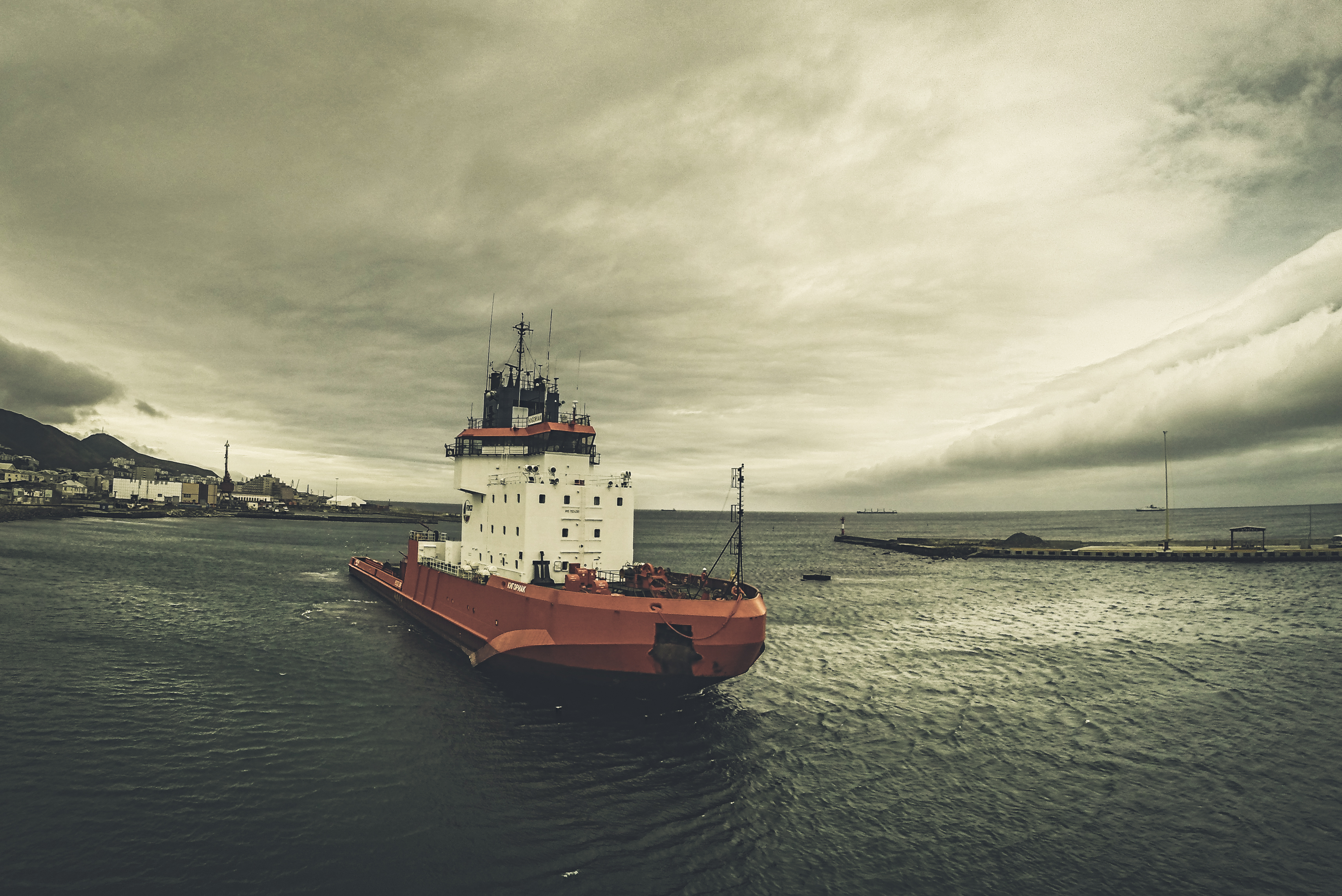

Canada
- Name: Canmar Kigoriak
- Owner: Dome Petroleum
- Operator: Canadian Marine Drilling
- Builder: Saint John Shipbuilding & Dry Dock Company, Saint John, New Brunswick, Canada
- Cost: C$25 million
- Yard number: 1132
- Laid down: 5 April 1979
- Launched: 28 July 1979
- Completed: 4 September 1979
- In service: 1979–1997
- Fate: Sold in 1997

Liberia
- Name: Kigoria
- Operator: International Transport Contractors
- Port of registry: Monrovia, Liberia
- In service: 1997–2003
- Fate: Sold in 2003

Russia
- Name: Talagy (Талаги) (2003–2010); Kigoriak (Кигориак) (2010–2022)
- Owner: FEMCO Group
- Port of registry: Kholmsk, Russia
- In service: 2003–2022
- Identification: IMO number: 7824261; MMSI number: 273449570; Call sign: UENL
- Fate: Sold for scrap in 2022

General characteristics
- Type: Icebreaker, AHTS
- Tonnage: 3,898 GT; 1,169 NT; 2,066 DWT
- Length: 90.7 m (298 ft)
- Beam: 17.25 m (57 ft) (moulded); 19.25 m (63 ft) (reamers)
- Draught: 8.5 m (28 ft) (maximum)
- Depth: 10 m (33 ft)
- Ice class: CASPPR Arctic Class 3; RS LL4
- Installed power: 2 × Sulzer 12ZV40/48 (2 × 8,700 hp)
- Propulsion: Single shaft; controllable pitch propeller
- Speed: 13.5 knots (25.0 km/h; 15.5 mph)
- Crew: 18 (accommodation for 22 crew and 12 passengers)

Kigoriak (Russian: Кигориак) was a Canadian and later Russian icebreaking anchor handling tug supply vessel. Built by Saint John Shipbuilding & Dry Dock Company for Canadian Marine Drilling (Canmar) in 1979 as Canmar Kigoriak, she was the first commercial icebreaking vessel developed to support offshore oil exploration in the Beaufort Sea.

When Canmar's icebreaker fleet was sold in 1997, the vessel's name was shortened to Kigoria and she was reflagged to Liberia. For the next six years, International Transport Contractors used the icebreaker mainly for ocean towage and salvage operations in the Atlantic Ocean. The vessel changed hands again in 2003 when she was sold to her current owner, FEMCO Group, and renamed first Talagy (Russian: Талаги) and, in 2010, Kigoriak.

After more than four decades of service, Kigoriak was sold for scrap in January 2022.

== History ==
=== Development and construction ===
In the mid-1970s, Canadian Marine Drilling (Canmar), the drilling subsidiary of Dome Petroleum, began drilling for oil in the Canadian part of the Beaufort Sea using ice-strengthened drillships and an extensive support fleet of icebreaking vessels. Aiming for year-round operations, the company also began developing its own experimental icebreaker concepts to support exploration drilling and, eventually, production-related operations.

The first vessel of this research and development program represented a radical departure from previous icebreaker design. In just eight weeks, Canmar's engineering and design team developed an icebreaker concept which emphasized simplicity and ease of construction to ensure quick delivery. While traditional icebreakers featured rounded hulls which were expensive to produce, in Canmar's design approximately 80 % of the shell plating consisted of flat plates and hard chines. The spoon-shaped bow also featured reamers to improve turning capability in ice by breaking a channel that wider than the vertical-sided midbody. While the hull surface was initially left unpainted with only a handful of sacrificial anodes, the bow was lined with nozzles that pumped 12,000 tons of sea water per hour onto the ice to reduce hull-ice friction. In the engine room, the simplest type of propulsion system was adopted: while most icebreakers featured diesel-driven generators, transformers and electric propulsion motors driving multiple shafts, Canmar opted for two medium-speed diesel engines mechanically geared to a single propeller shaft. The controllable-pitch propeller was shrouded in a nozzle that not only protected it from ice, but also increased thrust by 30 % at lower speeds.

Most icebreakers have two or more screws and people thought we were crazy with adopting the one-prop concept ... but we decided to put all of our eggs in one basket, and then made that basket stronger than hell.

— Gordon Harrison, President, Canadian Marine Drilling

After the icebreaker concept had been developed, Canmar hired the Vancouver-based engineering company Arctic Offshore Design to produce a tender package which was then handed over to Saint John Shipbuilding & Dry Dock Company for detailed planning and construction. Laid down on 5 April 1979 and launched only few months later as Canmar Kigoriak, the icebreaker was built in record time of only eight and a half months at a cost of about 25 million Canadian dollars. She was delivered to Canmar on 4 September 1979 and hastily departed to the Beaufort Sea shortly afterwards.

=== Canmar Kigoriak (1979–1997) ===
Canmar Kigoriak's primary mission was to protect stationary drillships from drifting ice through ice management. When a potentially dangerous ice feature was detected approaching the drill site and the spread-moored drillship, the icebreaker was dispatched to break it up into smaller pieces that would not pose a threat to the drilling operation; this allowed extending the drilling season by starting it earlier and ending it later. In addition, she was used for other tasks such as escorting drillships to and from the drill site. During the winter months, the vessel was left unmanned in cold lay-up together with other Canmar vessels.

In the late 1970s and early 1980s, Canmar Kigoriak was tested in all ice conditions found in the Beaufort Sea. In addition to determining the icebreaker's operational capability and limitations in extreme conditions such as large multi-year ice floes, systematic research was carried out to gain understanding of full-scale ship-ice interactions in order to develop feasible solutions for year-round transporting oil and gas from the Arctic in the future. During these trials, the hull and propulsion system were extensively instrumented to measure vessel motions and structural response during icebreaking operations. The tests, which began with the main voyage through the Northwest Passage and continued both during and outside of the drilling operations, demonstrated that Canmar Kigoriak was able to operate safely in ice conditions far beyond what was specified for her ice class. Despite ingesting two foreign objects (a mooring buoy and a steel I-beam) during the early years, the single-screw vessel could continue independent operations at moderate power levels without immediate repairs.

The lack of a protective coating was a serious mistake in the cold, oxygen rich, seawater and, despite the anodes, the vessel suffered from major corrosion and serious weld erosion. The vessel was placed in a floating dock in the Beaufort sea. Plates were replaced and welds were replenished and the entire underwater area was fresh water washed, blast cleaned and coated with about 700 microns of an ice resistant coating (Inerta 160) which had been developed in Finland. This coating basically preserved the vessel and improved the ice breaking capability.

Following Canmar Kigoriak's arrival to the Beaufort Sea in late 1979, the Canmar drillships drilled a total of 25 wells for Dome Petroleum and other oil companies in the Canadian part of the Beaufort Sea. In addition, four more wells were drilled by the drillships in the Alaskan waters in 1985–1991. Other wells were drilled from artificial drilling islands as well as novel drilling systems such as Kulluk and the single steel drilling caisson. While a number of oil and gas discoveries were made, none of the findings were sufficient to warrant commercial production. Following the falling oil prices in the 1980s and the Exxon Valdez oil spill in 1989, hydrocarbon exploration in the Beaufort Sea and the MacKenzie Delta gradually ended. In 1994, Canmar Kigoriak took part in disbanding Canmar's Arctic drilling fleet: after towing the laid-up drillship Canmar Explorer out of long-term storage in McKinley Bay and handing her over to a Russian tug bound for scrapyard in the Far East, she returned to collect the 30,000-ton floating dock Canmar Careen that was relocated to British Columbia to be stored until sold.

The experience gained from Canmar Kigoriak and Canmar's subsequent icebreakers was used in the design of the 1988-built Swedish icebreaker Oden which incorporates some design aspects of the Canadian icebreakers' hull form, propulsion and auxiliary systems used to reduce ice resistance.

=== Kigoria (1997–2003) ===
In 1997, Amoco sold Canmar's remaining assets, including Canmar Kigoriak, to an international consortium of shipping companies. After reflagging the vessel to Liberia and shortening her name to Kigoria, the full commercial and operational management was entrusted to International Transport Contractors (ITC), a subsidiary of the Norwegian-based Tschudi Group. Initially, she was chartered to support laying submarine communications cables such as Alaska United linking the State of Alaska to the Contiguous United States. In 2000, Kigoria was also used to remove and dispose of a section of the first transatlantic telegraph cable laid by the SS Great Eastern in 1866.

Despite being originally built as an icebreaker, Kigoria was often used in marine salvage operations where her large cargo deck and powerful crane were found useful. In August 1999, she was dispatched to search for a general cargo ship Lady Belle which had been abandoned in mid-Pacific following an engine room fire, but the stricken freighter was never found and the search was called off. In a more successful salvage operation in 2000, Kigoria refloated the 35,000-ton bulk carrier Bovec at Tuck Inlet near Prince Rupert, British Columbia. The ship had been awaiting for berthing in ballast when she began dragging anchors in a storm and drifted around. At low tide, her hull was subjected to excessive longitudinal stresses as the aft section with engine room, propeller and rudder was hanging unsupported in mid-air, completely out of the water, and there was a serious danger that the vessel would break in two during the upcoming spring tide. While Bovec was later declared constructive total loss and sold for scrap, the salvage operation was successful: with nearly 200 tons of pulling force, Kigoria managed to drag the bulk carrier off the rocks. Another successful salvage operation involving a 25,250-ton Panamian-flagged tanker Shauandar was completed off the Cuban coast few years later. In January 2003, Kigoria was dispatched from Bermuda to salvage the Finnish-flagged ro-ro vessel Camilla that had been abandoned 240 nautical miles (440 km; 280 mi) off Newfoundland due to engine troubles. Despite heavy weather, Kigoria managed to take the stricken vessel into tow and bring safely to Conception Bay.

Kigoria was also regularly employed for long and challenging ocean towages either alone or in co-operation with other tugs. In late 2000, she towed the jackup rig Rowan Gorilla III from Halifax, Nova Scotia south along the Atlantic coastline. While the contract stipulated that Kigoria was to utilize only one of her two main engines at a time, the second engine was started after four days when the three-vessel convoy encountered up to 10-metre (33 ft) swells and force-10 south-easterly winds, and the jackup rig with 150-metre (490 ft) legs arrived safely in Sabine Pass, Port Arthur, Texas just before Christmas. Next year, Kigoria participated in towing the 167-by-59-metre (548 by 194 ft) submersible laybarge LB 200 from North Sea to the Caribbean across the Atlantic with another tug. On the return leg, she towed a 61,500-ton tanker Berthea from Houston, Texas to Hamburg, Germany, for engine repairs in 31 days on her own and without utilizing more than 70 % of her engine power. Shortly afterwards, she did another westbound trans-Atlantic crossing with an average speed of 5.5 knots (10.2 km/h; 6.3 mph), towing the 121-by-74-metre (397 by 243 ft) accommodation platform Safe Britannia, and returned with the semi-submersible drilling rig Ocean Whittington that was towed from Brazil to the Namibian coast. After having remained in the West African offshore fields for some time, the heavy icebreaker was contracted for yet another transatlantic tow when the 108-by-76-metre (354 by 249 ft) semi-submersible accommodation platform Polyconcord was relocated from Madeira to the Cantarell Field off Mexico.

In 2002, Kigoria finally returned to the Arctic when she was chartered to tow the single steel drilling caisson (SSDC) in co-operation with another icebreaker, Arctic Kalvik. The 125,000-ton Arctic drilling unit, which consists of the forward two thirds of the hull of a very large crude carrier mated with a 218 by 110 metres (715 by 361 ft) submersible barge, would be used to drill an exploratory well for Encana Oil & Gas at the McCovey prospect. The 600-nautical-mile (1,100 km; 690 mi) tow from Port Clarence, Alaska to Prudhoe Bay was completed in just 12 days. In the following summer, Kigoria returned to the Beaufort Sea to tow the SSDC to a storage location near Herschel Island. This month-long round trip via the Northwest Passage marked the end of ITC's five-year management of the vessel: shortly afterwards, Kigoria was sold to Russia.

=== Talagy (2003–2010) and Kigoriak (2010–present) ===
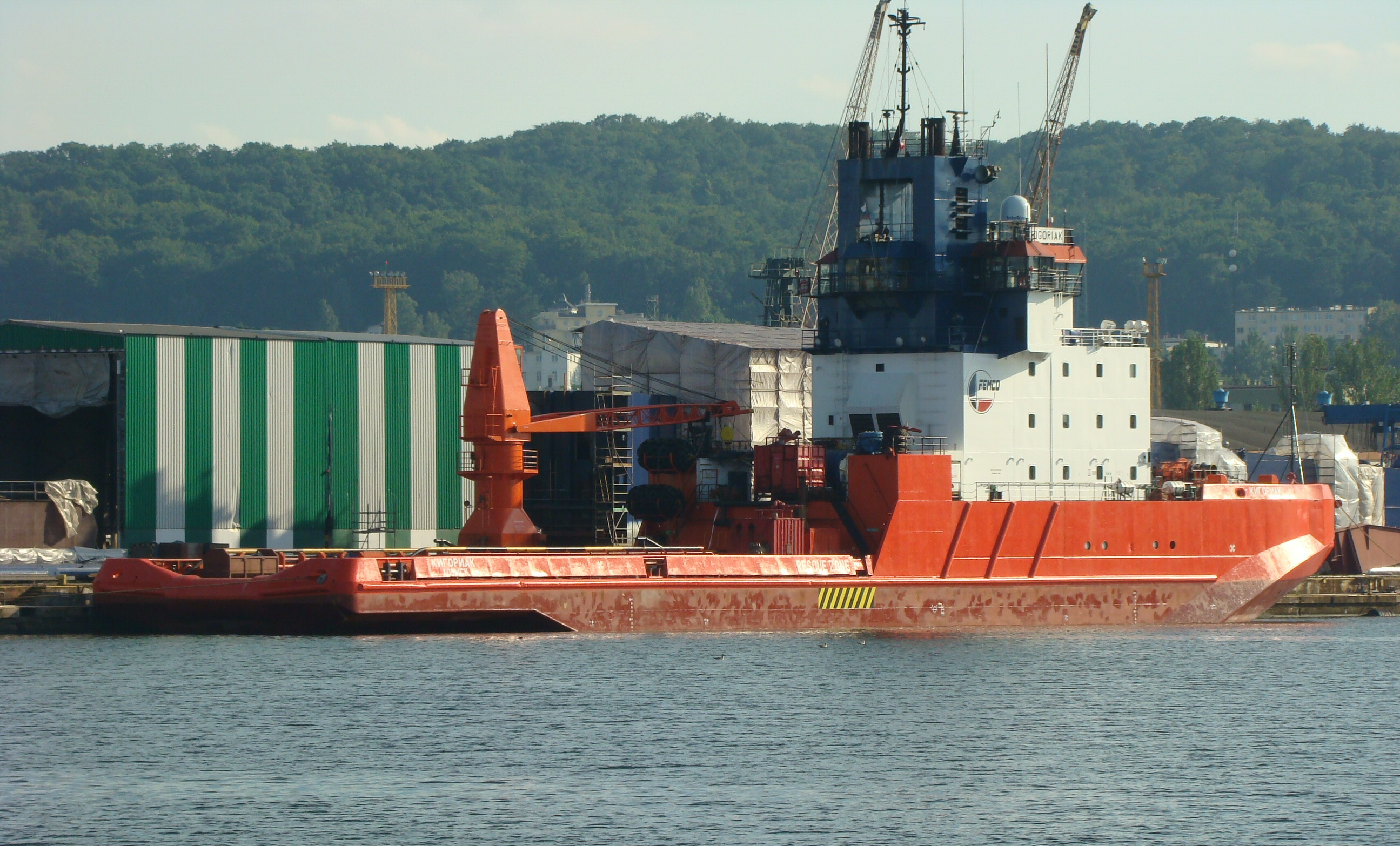
Kigoriak in Gdynia, Poland, in 2018.

In late 2003, Kigoria was acquired by a joint venture between the Russian FEMCO Group and the Netherlands-based Smit Terminals and reflagged to Russia. Following a refit in Gdansk, Poland, the icebreaker was chartered to provide icebreaking and escort services to tankers calling Rosneft's oil terminal near Arkhangelsk. She was renamed Talagy (Russian: Талаги) after a village in the Arkhangelsk region where the terminal is located. However, few years later she was moved to the Sakhalin region to support ExxonMobil's Sakhalin-I project. While in the Far East, Talagy was chartered by ION Geophysical to support seismic surveys in the Chukchi Sea and Beaufort Sea regions in 2010. Later that year, the vessel was given back part of her original name, Kigoriak (Russian: Кигориак).

In 2011, Kigoriak participated in towing the 117,000-ton, 126-by-126-metre (413 by 413 ft) ice-resistant offshore platform for the Prirazlomnoye field from Murmansk to the Pechora Sea.

In 2018, Kigoriak operated in the Baltic Sea to support the laying of the Nord Stream 2 natural gas pipeline. In 2019, she participated in Gazprom's drilling operations in the Kara Sea.

In late 2020, Kigoriak was chartered to escort an ice-strengthened cargo ship, Sparta III, to Dudinka. On the return leg, the vessels became beset in ice near Mys Sopochnaya Karga in the Yenisey river estuary. As a result, Sparta III's operator Oboronlogistics was forced to ask FSUE Atomflot to divert one of the nuclear-powered icebreakers operating in the Gulf of Ob to free the vessels.

FEMCO sold Kigoriak for scrap in January 2022. The shipbreaker reportedly paid a premium price, $745 per light displacement ton, due to the quality of equipment on board.

== Design ==
Kigoriak was 90.7 metres (298 ft) long overall and 78.9 metres (259 ft) between perpendiculars. Her hull had a beam of 17.25 metres (56.6 ft) amidships and 19.25 metres (63.2 ft) over the reamers. She had a maximum draught of 8.5 metres (28 ft) and moulded depth of 10 metres (33 ft).

The simplified hull geometry pioneered by the Canadians consisted mainly of flat plates and hard chines. Kigoriak's spoon-shaped icebreaking bow had a flat stem and sharp shoulders followed by the channel-widening reamers at the waterline and a heavy forefoot followed by a full-length box keel. Abaft, she had a simple barge-type hull with a single chine and vertical sides ending to an undercut stern. Compared to traditional icebreakers with rounded bilges, the simplified hull geometry also helped to dampen rolling in open seas. Internally, the hull was divided into seven watertight compartments, two of which could flood without sinking or capsizing the vessel, and all fuel tanks were protected by double sides to prevent spills in the event of hull damage. At the time of delivery, Kigoriak was the first icebreaking vessel built to meet the requirements of the Canadian Arctic Shipping Pollution Prevention Rules (CASPPR). Rated Arctic Class 3, she was designed to maintain forward motion through three feet (1 metre) of ice. However, her bow was strengthened above Arctic Class 4 requirements and she also had sufficient propulsion power to meet the higher requirements.

Kigoriak had a diesel-mechanical propulsion system with two medium-speed diesel engines driving a single 4.3-metre (14 ft) four-bladed ducted controllable pitch propeller. The twelve-cylinder Sulzer 12ZV40/48 main engines were rated at 8,700 hp (6,500 kW) each and geared to the propeller shaft using wet clutches that allowed slipping at torque peaks to protect the drivetrain from damage. The main engines could also be used to power the hull lubrication system: when the vessel was moving at a speed of two knots (3.7 km/h; 2.3 mph), the system's two pumps created a 15-centimetre (6 in) water cover on the ice over the full beam of the vessel. For maneuvering, the vessel had two 1,180 hp (880 kW) transverse tunnel thrusters: one in the bow and another in the stern.

== See also ==
- History of the petroleum industry in Canada (frontier exploration and development)
