= Vladimir Ignatyuk (icebreaker) =

Russian icebreaking anchor handling tug supply vessel

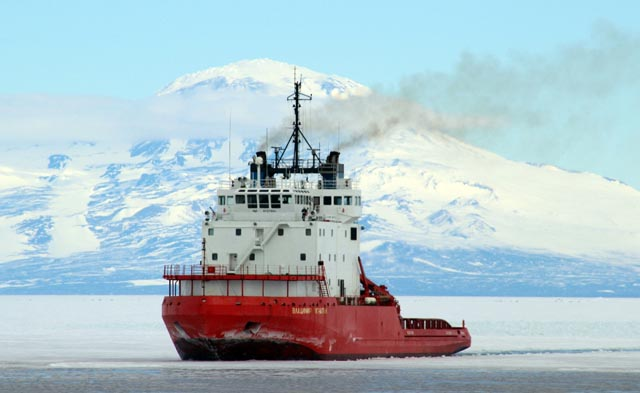
- Vladimir Ignatyuk at McMurdo Sound in Antarctica, 6 February 2013

History

Canada
- Name: Kalvik (1983–1997); Arctic Kalvik (1997–2003)
- Namesake: Inuktitut for "wolverine"
- Owner: BeauDril (Gulf Canada Resources) (1983–1997); Fednav (1997–2003)
- Port of registry: Vancouver, British Columbia (1983–1997); Barbados (1997–2003)
- Ordered: 1 December 1979
- Builder: Burrard-Yarrows Corp., Esquimalt
- Cost: C$79 million (two ships without propulsion drive trains)
- Yard number: 554
- Laid down: 9 June 1982
- Launched: 2 April 1983
- Completed: 30 July 1983
- In service: 1983–2003
- Fate: Sold to Russia in 2003

Russia
- Name: Vladimir Ignatyuk
- Namesake: Vladimir Adamovich Ignatyuk
- Owner: Murmansk Shipping Company (2003–2025); LLC "Grand Flot" (2025–present)
- Port of registry: Murmansk, Russia
- Acquired: July 2003
- In service: 2003–present
- Identification: IMO number: 8127804; MMSI number: 273448450; Call sign: UGTP
- Status: Laid up

General characteristics (as Vladimir Ignatyuk)
- Type: Icebreaker, AHTS
- Tonnage: 4,391 GT; 1,317 NT; 2,076 DWT
- Displacement: 7,077 tons
- Length: 88 m (289 ft)
- Beam: 17.82 m (58 ft)
- Draught: 8.3 m (27 ft) (maximum); 7.7 m (25 ft) (icebreaking)
- Depth: 10 m (33 ft)
- Ice class: RMRS Icebreaker7; (originally CASPPR Arctic Class 4)
- Installed power: 4 × Stork-Werkspoor 8TM410 (4 × 5,800 hp)
- Propulsion: Two shafts; controllable pitch propellers
- Speed: 14 knots (26 km/h; 16 mph) (two engines); 3 knots (5.6 km/h; 3.5 mph) in 4 ft (1.2 m) ice
- Crew: Accommodation for 34
- Aviation facilities: Helideck

Vladimir Ignatyuk (Russian: Владимир Игнатюк) is a Russian icebreaking anchor handling tug supply vessel. She was built by Burrard-Yarrows Corporation in Canada in 1983 as Kalvik as part of an Arctic drilling system developed by BeauDril, the drilling subsidiary of Gulf Canada Resources. After the offshore oil exploration in the Beaufort Sea ended in the early 1990s, she was sold to the Canadian shipping company Fednav in 1997 and renamed Arctic Kalvik. In 2003, she was purchased by Murmansk Shipping Company and transferred to Russia.

Vladimir Ignatyuk has a sister ship, CCGS Terry Fox, which is operated by the Canadian Coast Guard.

== Development and construction ==
In the mid-1970s, Gulf Canada Resources began developing an Arctic drilling system consisting of two mobile drilling units: a Mobile Arctic Caisson (MAC) that could be submerged and filled with gravel to form an artificial drilling island in waters up to 40 metres (130 ft) in depth and a floating Conical Drilling Unit (CDU) designed for drilling in water depths between 40 and 60 metres (130 and 200 ft) while afloat. The intention of this development was to overcome the relatively short operating window of drillships during the ice-free season (100 to 110 days a year) and the water depth limitations of artificial dredged islands in the Canadian part of the Beaufort Sea. The drilling units, each capable of completing one exploration well per year, would be supported by four Arctic Class 4 vessels: two large icebreakers providing 24-hour ice management and standby services on the drilling site and two smaller icebreaking vessels responsible for anchor handling and supply runs between the drilling rigs and coastal bases. By 1982, both drilling units and all four icebreaking vessels were under construction in Canada and Japan for BeauDril, Gulf Canada's drilling subsidiary, and the company had committed itself to a billion-dollar exploration program between 1983 and 1988.

The icebreaker design was provided by the Montreal-based engineering company German & Milne. During the development phase, the hull form was extensively tested at the Hamburg Ship Model Basin (HSVA) ice tank with particular emphasis of preventing broken ice floes from flowing under the hull and into the propellers. The result was a production-friendly fully-developable hull form with a semi-spoon bow and large ice plough. The construction of the two icebreakers was awarded to Burrard-Yarrows Corporation in December 1979 and the work was split between the company's Victoria and Vancouver divisions. In order to expedite the delivery of the vessels, Gulf Canada had already purchased the engines, gearboxes, shaft lines and propellers before signing the C$79 million shipbuilding contract for two hulls.

The keel of newbuilding number 554 was laid at the Burrard-Yarrows Victoria shipyard on 9 June 1982 and the vessel was launched on 2 April 1983 as Kalvik, Inuktitut for "wolverine", following a naming contest by Northern Territories school children. The icebreaker was delivered on 30 July 1983, slightly behind the original schedule which called for delivery in April when Gulf Canada's exploratory drilling program was set to begin. Kalvik's sister ship, Terry Fox, was delivered in Vancouver in September of the same year. At the time, Beaudril's two 23,200 hp (17,300 kW) icebreakers were the most powerful privately owned icebreaking vessels in the world.

== Design ==
=== General characteristics ===
Vladimir Ignatyuk is 88 metres (289 ft) long overall and 75 metres (246 ft) between perpendiculars. She has a beam of 17.82 metres (58 ft) and draws 8.3 metres (27 ft) of water when fully laden. However, during icebreaking operations she operates at a reduced draught of 7.7 metres (25 ft) according to her ice class certificate issued by the Russian Maritime Register of Shipping.

While the crew's common spaces such as mess rooms and lounges are arranged on the main deck, the accommodation — single cabins with private washrooms for the officers and semi-private washrooms for the crew — is arranged in the box-shaped deckhouse. There are berths for 18 crew members and 16 supernumeraries; 34 in total. When operating as a supply vessel, Vladimir Ignatyuk can carry 100 tonnes of bulk cargo in silos, 800 tonnes of deck cargo on the 37 by 13 metres (121 by 43 ft) aft deck, and 200 tonnes of drilling water. The towing gear consists of an 80-ton winch holding 1,500 metres (1,600 yd) of wire and a separate 200-ton double-drum anchor-handling winch. Although initially built without one, Vladimir Ignatyuk was later fitted with a helideck above the foredeck.

=== Power and propulsion ===
Vladimir Ignatyuk has a diesel-mechanical propulsion system consisting of four main engines driving two shafts through twin input-single output gearboxes. The prime movers are eight-cylinder Stork-Werkspoor 8TM410 medium-speed diesel engines producing 5,800 hp (4,300 kW) at 600 rpm in continuous service. Each pair of main engines is coupled to a Lohmann & Stolterfoht Navilus GVE 1500 A single-stage reduction gearbox via flexible couplings designed to automatically disengage if the propellers are blocked by ice. However, each propeller shaft is also fitted with a heavy flywheel 3 metres (10 ft) in diameter and 0.6 metres (2 ft) in thickness to increase rotational inertia and absorb shocks from propeller-ice interaction. Unlike the other Canadian offshore icebreakers built in the 1980s, Vladimir Ignatyuk does not have a propeller nozzles to shroud her propellers. Her 4.8-metre (16 ft) LIPS Canada nickel aluminium bronze controllable pitch propellers are designed to transmit 9,564 hp (7,132 kW) of power per shaft to the water and produce a combined static bollard pull of about 1,590 kilonewtons (162 t_{f}). For onboard electricity production, the ship has two 800 kW (1,100 hp) Caterpillar D399 ship service diesel generators and a single 200 kW (270 hp) Caterpillar 3406 DITA emergency diesel generator. In addition, both reduction gearboxes are fitted with clutched power take-offs for 1,250 kVa shaft alternators that supply power to the stern thruster and air bubbling system compressors.

In line with her original Canadian Arctic Shipping Pollution Prevention Regulations (CASPPR) Arctic Class 4 rating, Vladimir Ignatyuk is designed to break at least 4-foot (1.2 m) first-year level ice with a continuous speed of 3 knots (5.6 km/h; 3.5 mph). During icebreaking operations, the ice friction is reduced by lubricating the hull-ice interface with a 750 kW (1,010 hp) low-pressure air bubbling system developed by Wärtsilä. In open water, the system can also act as a bow thruster and used for maneuvering together with the ship's single centerline rudder and a 500 horsepower (370 kW) transverse stern thruster. When operating in ice-free waters, the ship can transit at an economical speed of about 14 knots (26 km/h; 16 mph) with just two main engines.

== Career ==
=== Kalvik (1983–1997) ===
Between 1983 and 1990, BeauDril's mobile drilling units drilled a total of nineteen exploratory wells in the Canadian part of the Beaufort Sea with the support of Kalvik and other icebreaking vessels: nine with the Mobile Arctic Caisson Molikpaq and ten with the Conical Drilling Unit Kulluk. Twelve wells alone were drilled in the Amauligak prospect, the most significant oil and gas field discovered in the region, but the high expectations for the Beaufort Sea were not met: the area was characterized by a large number of small, widely scattered resources. Molikpaq was mothballed after completing the last well in 1990. However, Kulluk was used to drill a total of four wells in 1992 and 1993 for ARCO Alaska on the American part of the Beaufort Sea before being cold-stacked at Tuktoyaktuk.

In 1993, the majority of BeauDril's fleet was purchased by Canadian Marine Drilling (Canmar), the drilling subsidiary of Dome Petroleum (later Amoco Canada) that had been Gulf Canada's main competitor in the Beaufort Sea for more than a decade. However, the company decided to retain the ownership of Kalvik while her sister ship, Terry Fox, was sold to the Canadian Coast Guard following a two-year lease. In 1997, Kalvik was finally sold to the Canadian shipping company Fednav who renamed her Arctic Kalvik and reflagged the vessel to Barbados.

=== Arctic Kalvik (1997–2003) ===
In September 1999, Arctic Kalvik was chartered to the Dutch marine salvage company Bureau Wijsmuller and stationed at Land's End. In January 2000, she helped to refloat the unladen 16,529 DWT chemical tanker Corsica that had dragged anchor in a storm shortly before New Year. While the icebreaker had to remain about 900 metres (980 yd) from the stricken tanker due to shallow waters, she succeeded in pulling the other ship off the rocks by using 75 % of her rated bollard pull. In February 2000, Arctic Kalvik also participated in refloating the car carrier Asian Parade which had been stranded at Codling Bank on the Irish coast. In October 2001, Wijsmuller terminated the vessel's charter.

In September 2001, Arctic Kalvik was contracted by Crowley Maritime to assist towing the cold-stacked Concrete Island Drilling System (CIDS) Glomar Beaufort Sea I from Prudhoe Bay to Sovetskaya Gavan in the Russian Far East. The submersible gravity-based structure, which also dated back to the 1980s oil exploration in the Arctic, would be rebuilt as the drilling and production platform Orlan for Exxon Neftegas's Sakhalin-I project. Arctic Kalvik provided ice management during the initial tow from Prudhoe Bay to Barrow, and then joined two other tugs to tow the 312-by-312-foot (95 by 95 m) structure across the ocean. The tow arrived in Russia on 14 October 2001 after having refueled from a Russian tanker mid-voyage.

In 2002, Arctic Kalvik returned to Alaska through the Northwest Passage to tow another Beaufort Sea drilling unit, the single steel drilling caisson (SDC), from Port Clarence, Alaska to Prudhoe Bay. The 125,000-ton Arctic drilling unit consisting of the forward two thirds of the hull of a very large crude carrier mated with a 218 by 110 metres (715 by 361 ft) submersible barge would be used to drill an exploratory well for Encana Oil & Gas at the McCovey prospect. Together with another former Beaufort Sea icebreaker, Kigoria, the 600-nautical-mile (1,100 km; 690 mi) was completed in just 12 days.

In 2003, Arctic Kalvik was sold to the Russian Murmansk Shipping Company (MSCO) and renamed Vladimir Ignatyuk after Vladimir Adamovich Ignatyuk (1927–2003).

=== Vladimir Ignatyuk (2003–present) ===
According to MSCO, the acquisition of Vladimir Ignatyuk in July 2003 marked the first time in the history of modern Russia when an icebreaker was owned by a private commercial company instead of a state-controlled entity. The company's spokespersons went as far as to claim that the 7,000-ton icebreaker was "in many ways analogous" to the considerably larger Russian polar icebreakers Kapitan Nikolaev and Kapitan Dranitsyn. Later in 2003, another former Canadian Beaufort Sea offshore icebreaker, the 1979-built former Canmar Kigoriak (then just Kigoria), was also purchased by another Russian owner.

In November 2004, Vladimir Ignatyuk participated in the clean-up operation following the foundering of the 19,500 DWT bulk carrier Stepan Razin which was also owned by MSCO. The ship, laden with 18,000 tons of apatite concentrate bound for Finland in its cargo holds and 287 tons of fuel oil in its tanks, dragged anchor in a storm on 23 October and sank after drifting onto rocks near the entrance to the Kola Bay. Vladimir Ignatyuk managed to pump about 60 tonnes of fuel oil from the wreck's fuel tanks.

In 2005, Vladimir Ignatyuk returned to Alaska to once again tow the single steel drilling caisson after Devon Canada had selected the SDC over an artificial ice island to drill the first wildcat well in the Canadian Beaufort Sea in 17 years. With the original Beaufort Sea offshore fleet disbanded and sold overseas, the oil company had to source the icebreaker all the way from Murmansk to complete the one-day tow from Thetis Bay anchorage to the Paktoa C-60 drilling site.

In 2006, Vladimir Ignatyuk was chartered by Royal Dutch Shell together with a flotilla of other contracted icebreakers from Russia, Finland and Sweden to support the company's oil exploration activities in the Beaufort Sea. Although Shell did not manage to begin exploratory drilling until 2012, by which time Vladimir Ignatyuk was no longer part of the support fleet, the initial plan would have brought together two key components of Gulf Canada's original Arctic drilling system developed and built in the early 1980s: the Conical Drilling Unit (CDU) Kulluk and one of the Arctic Class 4 icebreakers designed to protect it from drifting ice during drilling operations. Vladimir Ignatyuk returned to her home port, Murmansk, from the three-year deployment in the US waters in September 2008.

In late 2008, Vladimir Ignatyuk began towing the hull of the Hutton TLP platform from Murmansk to Cádiz, Spain, for rebuilding. The decommissioned tension-leg platform had been acquired by Sevmorneftegaz in 2002 and its 19,000-tonne topsides had already been transferred to a new ice-resistant production platform being built for the Prirazlomnoye field in the Pechora Sea. While underway to Lerwick for refueling, one of the tow lines connecting the 23,000-tonne platform hull to the two tugboats broke free, but was later reconnected. In the end, the hull was towed to Cromarty Firth where it remained until it was towed to a scrapyard in 2021.

In August 2011, National Science Foundation (NSF) contracted Vladimir Ignatyuk to support the annual break-in and resupply mission to McMurdo Station in Antarctica. The Russian icebreaker, which was already providing icebreaking support for the Indian Antarctic Program, would replace the Swedish icebreaker Oden following an announcement from the Swedish Maritime Administration that the nation's most powerful icebreaker was direly needed in the Baltic Sea during the northern hemisphere winter which coincided with the Antarctic resupply mission. At the time, United States Coast Guard had two heavy icebreakers dating back to the mid-1970s, USCGC Polar Star and USCGC Polar Sea, but neither was operational: the former had been placed in a caretaker status in 2006 and the latter had suffered an engine casualty in 2010. After the one-year fixed contract worth $11,558,554, NSF and MSCO agreed to exercise the optional extension although the shipping company was initially reluctant due to concerns of the icebreaker's ability to operate in Antarctic pack ice, and Vladimir Ignatyuk returned to McMurdo also during the 2012–2013 season.

In 2017, Vladimir Ignatyuk made three voyages to Franz Josef Land to transport construction material, equipment and spare parts, and food to the Arctic archipelago. Afterwards, the icebreaker was laid up in Murmansk and the Russian Maritime Register of Shipping withdrew her classification due to overdue surveys in October 2018. The ship's owner was declared bankrupt in October 2020.

In August 2025, the defunct Murmansk Shipping Company's assets, including Vladimir Ignatyuk, were auctioned off to another Russian company, LLC "Grand Flot".

== See also ==
- History of the petroleum industry in Canada (frontier exploration and development)
