= CCGS Terry Fox =

Canadian Coast Guard heavy icebreaker

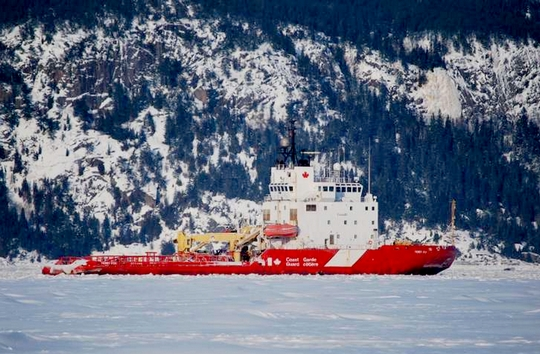
- CCGS Terry Fox in Saguenay River in 2009

History

Canada
- Name: Terry Fox
- Namesake: Terry Fox
- Owner: BeauDril (Gulf Canada Resources)
- Port of registry: Vancouver, British Columbia
- Ordered: 1 December 1979
- Builder: Burrard-Yarrows Corp., North Vancouver
- Cost: C$79 million (two ships without propulsion drive trains)
- Yard number: 107
- Laid down: 15 June 1982
- Launched: 23 April 1983
- Completed: 16 September 1983
- In service: 1983–1991
- Fate: First leased and later sold to the Canadian Coast Guard

Canada
- Name: CCGS Terry Fox
- Owner: BeauDril (Gulf Canada Resources) (1991–1993); Canadian Coast Guard (1993–present)
- Operator: Canadian Coast Guard
- Port of registry: Ottawa, Ontario
- In service: 1991–present
- Home port: CCG Base St. John's (Newfoundland and Labrador Region)
- Identification: IMO number: 8127799; MMSI number: 316122000; Call sign: CGTF
- Status: In service

General characteristics (in CCG service)
- Type: Heavy icebreaker (CCG)
- Tonnage: 4,234 GT; 1,955 NT; 2,113 DWT
- Length: 88 m (289 ft)
- Beam: 17.82 m (58 ft)
- Draught: 8.3 m (27 ft) (maximum)
- Ice class: CASPPR Arctic Class 4
- Installed power: 4 × Stork-Werkspoor 8TM410 (4 × 5,800 hp) (as built); 4 × Bergen B33:45L8P (refit)
- Propulsion: Two shafts; controllable pitch propellers
- Speed: 16 knots (30 km/h; 18 mph) (maximum); 14 knots (26 km/h; 16 mph) (two engines); 3 knots (5.6 km/h; 3.5 mph) in 4 ft (1.2 m) ice
- Range: 1,920 nautical miles (3,560 km; 2,210 mi)
- Endurance: 58 days
- Complement: 10 officers; 14 crew; 10 additional berths

CCGS Terry Fox is a Canadian Coast Guard heavy icebreaker. She was originally built by Burrard-Yarrows Corporation in Canada in 1983 as part of an Arctic drilling system developed by BeauDril, the drilling subsidiary of Gulf Canada Resources. After the offshore oil exploration in the Beaufort Sea ended in the early 1990s, she was first leased and then sold to the Canadian Coast Guard.

Terry Fox's sister ship, Kalvik, is today owned by the Russian Murmansk Shipping Company as Vladimir Ignatyuk.

== Development and construction ==
In the mid-1970s, Gulf Canada Resources began developing an Arctic drilling system consisting of two mobile drilling units: a Mobile Arctic Caisson (MAC) that could be submerged and filled with gravel to form an artificial drilling island in waters up to 40 metres (130 ft) in depth and a floating Conical Drilling Unit (CDU) designed for drilling in water depths between 40 and 60 metres (130 and 200 ft) while afloat. The intention of this development was to overcome the relatively short operating window of drillships during the ice-free season (100 to 110 days a year) and the water depth limitations of artificial dredged islands in the Canadian part of the Beaufort Sea. The drilling units, each capable of completing one exploration well per year, would be supported by four Arctic Class 4 vessels: two large icebreakers providing 24-hour ice management and standby services on the drilling site and two smaller icebreaking vessels responsible for anchor handling and supply runs between the drilling rigs and coastal bases. By 1982, both drilling units and all four icebreaking vessels were under construction in Canada and Japan for BeauDril, Gulf Canada's drilling subsidiary, and the company had committed itself to a billion-dollar exploration program between 1983 and 1988.

The icebreaker design was provided by the Montreal-based engineering company German & Milne. During the development phase, the hull form was extensively tested at the Hamburg Ship Model Basin (HSVA) ice tank with particular emphasis of preventing broken ice floes from flowing under the hull and into the propellers. The result was a production-friendly fully-developable hull form with a semi-spoon bow and large ice plough. The construction of the two icebreakers was awarded to Burrard-Yarrows Corporation in December 1979 and the work was split between the company's Victoria and Vancouver divisions. In order to expedite the delivery of the vessels, Gulf Canada had already purchased the engines, gearboxes, shaft lines and propellers before signing the C$79 million shipbuilding contract for two hulls.

The keel of newbuilding number 107 was laid at the Burrard-Yarrows Vancouver shipyard on 15 June 1982 and the vessel was launched on 23 April 1983 as Terry Fox. While the other BeauDril icebreakers and drilling units were given names drawn from the Northern Territories native languages, Terry Fox was named after Terrance Stanley "Terry" Fox (1958–1981), a Canadian athlete, humanitarian and cancer research activist known for his 1980 Marathon for Hope, an attempted cross-Canada run to raise money and awareness for cancer research, after losing his right leg to osteosarcoma. The icebreaker was completed on 16 September 1983, slightly behind the original schedule which called for delivery in April when Gulf Canada's exploratory drilling program was set to begin. Terry Fox's sister ship, Kalvik, had been delivered by Victoria shipyard in July of the same year. At the time, Beaudril's two 23,200 hp (17,300 kW) icebreakers were the most powerful privately owned icebreaking vessels in the world.

== Design ==
=== General characteristics ===
Terry Fox is 88 metres (289 ft) long overall and 75 metres (246 ft) between perpendiculars. She has a beam of 17.82 metres (58 ft) and draws 8.3 metres (27 ft) of water when fully laden.

While the crew's common spaces such as mess rooms and lounges are arranged on the main deck, the accommodation is arranged in the box-shaped deckhouse. In the Canadian Coast Guard service, Terry Fox has a complement of 10 officers and 14 crew, and 10 additional berths. The towing gear consists of an 80-ton winch holding 1,500 metres (1,600 yd) of wire and a separate 200-ton double-drum anchor-handling winch. Unlike her sister ship, Terry Fox has not been retrofitted with a helideck. However, her cargo-handling capability has been increased with a 40-tonne cargo crane and a 490 m^{3} (17,000 cu ft) cargo hold in place of the original bulk cargo tanks.

=== Power and propulsion ===
Terry Fox has a diesel-mechanical propulsion system consisting of four main engines driving two shafts through twin input-single output gearboxes. As built, the ship was fitted with eight-cylinder Stork-Werkspoor 8TM410 medium-speed diesel engines producing 5,800 hp (4,300 kW) at 600 rpm in continuous service. The engines were coupled to a Lohmann & Stolterfoht Navilus GVE 1500 A single-stage reduction gearbox via flexible couplings designed to automatically disengage if the propellers are blocked by ice. During the drivetrain refit, the original main engines were replaced with eight-cylinder Bergen B33:45L8P medium-speed engines. The original gearboxes were replaced as well.

Unlike the other Canadian offshore icebreakers built in the 1980s, Terry Fox does not have a propeller nozzles to shroud her propellers. However, each propeller shaft was also fitted with a heavy flywheel 3 metres (10 ft) in diameter and 0.6 metres (2 ft) in thickness to increase rotational inertia and absorb shocks from propeller-ice interaction. Her 4.8-metre (16 ft) LIPS Canada nickel aluminium bronze controllable pitch propellers are designed to transmit 9,564 hp (7,132 kW) of power per shaft to the water and produce a combined static bollard pull of about 1,590 kilonewtons (162 t_{f}). For onboard electricity production, the ship has two 750 kW (1,010 hp) Caterpillar 3512 series ship service diesel generators and a single 200 kW (270 hp) Caterpillar 3406 DITA emergency diesel generator. In addition, both reduction gearboxes are fitted with clutched power take-offs for 1,250 kVa shaft alternators that supply power to the stern thruster and air bubbling system compressors.

In line with her original Canadian Arctic Shipping Pollution Prevention Regulations (CASPPR) Arctic Class 4 rating, Terry Fox is designed to break at least 4-foot (1.2 m) first-year level ice with a continuous speed of 3 knots (5.6 km/h; 3.5 mph). During icebreaking operations, the ice friction is reduced by lubricating the hull-ice interface with a 750 kW (1,010 hp) low-pressure air bubbling system developed by Wärtsilä. In open water, the system can also act as a bow thruster and used for maneuvering together with the ship's single centerline rudder and a 500 horsepower (370 kW) transverse stern thruster. When operating in ice-free waters, the ship was designed transit at an economical speed of about 14 knots (26 km/h; 16 mph) with just two main engines, but her maximum speed is quoted as 16 knots (30 km/h; 18 mph).

== Career ==
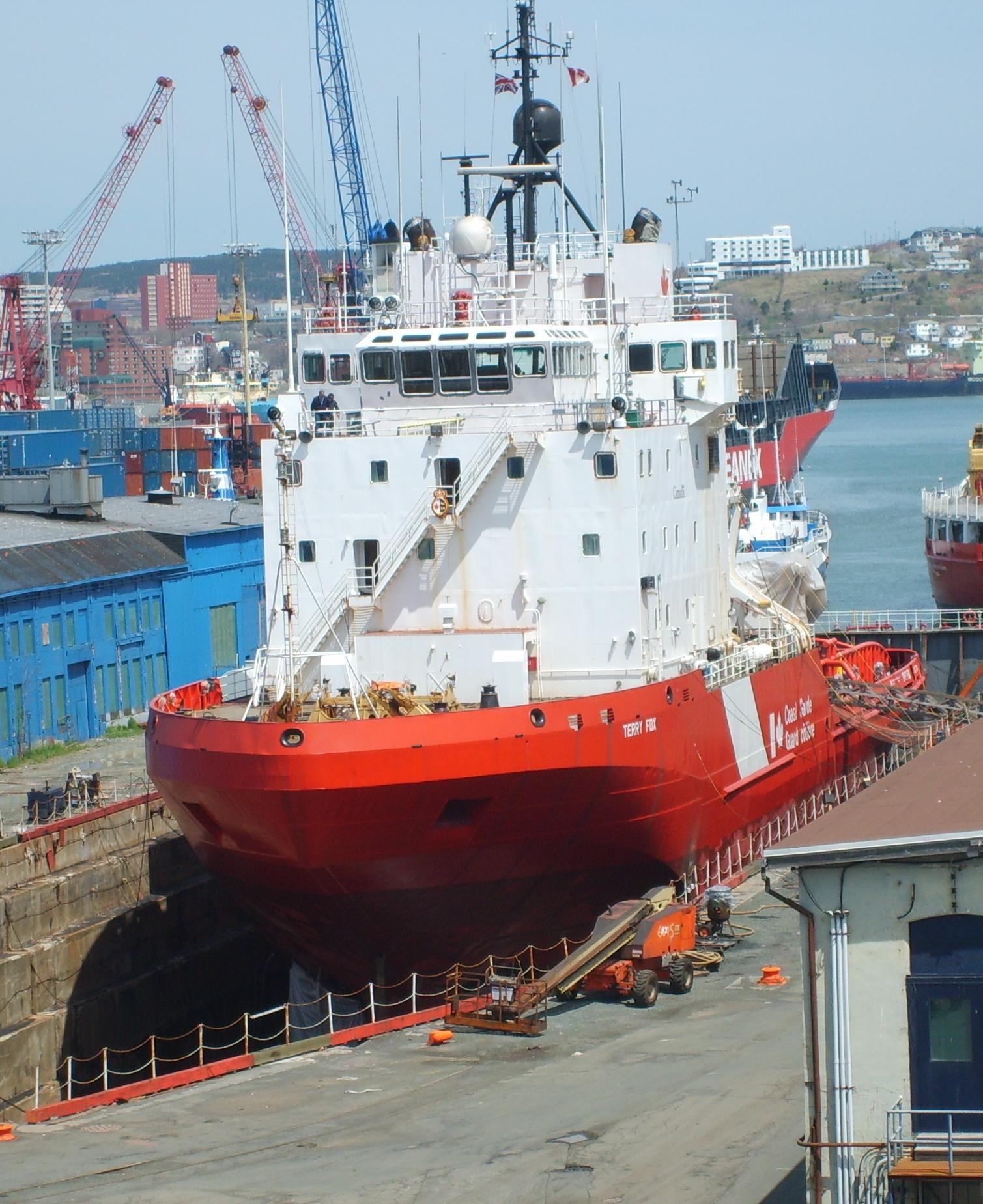
CCGS Terry Fox docked at NewDock Shipyard in St. John's in 2008.

=== Terry Fox (1983–1991) ===
During her maiden voyage to the Arctic, Terry Fox was called in to assist the National Oceanic and Atmospheric Administration (NOAA) oceanographic survey ship Surveyor that had become beset in 1.2-to-1.5-metre (4 to 5 ft) thick ice west of Point Franklin off Alaska. By the time the icebreaker arrived and freed the ship, Surveyor had been drifting with the ice pack for eight days.

Between 1983 and 1990, BeauDril's mobile drilling units drilled a total of nineteen exploratory wells in the Canadian part of the Beaufort Sea with the support of Terry Fox and other icebreaking vessels: nine with the Mobile Arctic Caisson Molikpaq and ten with the Conical Drilling Unit Kulluk. Twelve wells alone were drilled in the Amauligak prospect, the most significant oil and gas field discovered in the region, but the high expectations for the Beaufort Sea were not met: the area was characterized by a large number of small, widely scattered resources. Molikpaq was mothballed after completing the last well in 1990.

On 1 November 1991, Terry Fox was leased to the Canadian Coast Guard for two years to replace the decommissioned CCGS John A. MacDonald during the extensive modernization of CCGS Louis S. St-Laurent. During the leasing period, the icebreaker was found to meet Canadian Coast Guard's needs satisfactorily, and the vessel was purchased from Gulf Canada Resources on 1 November 1993. Around the same time, the majority of BeauDril's fleet was purchased by Canadian Marine Drilling (Canmar), the drilling subsidiary of Dome Petroleum (later Amoco Canada) that had been Gulf Canada's main competitor in the Beaufort Sea for more than a decade.

=== CCGS Terry Fox (1991–present) ===
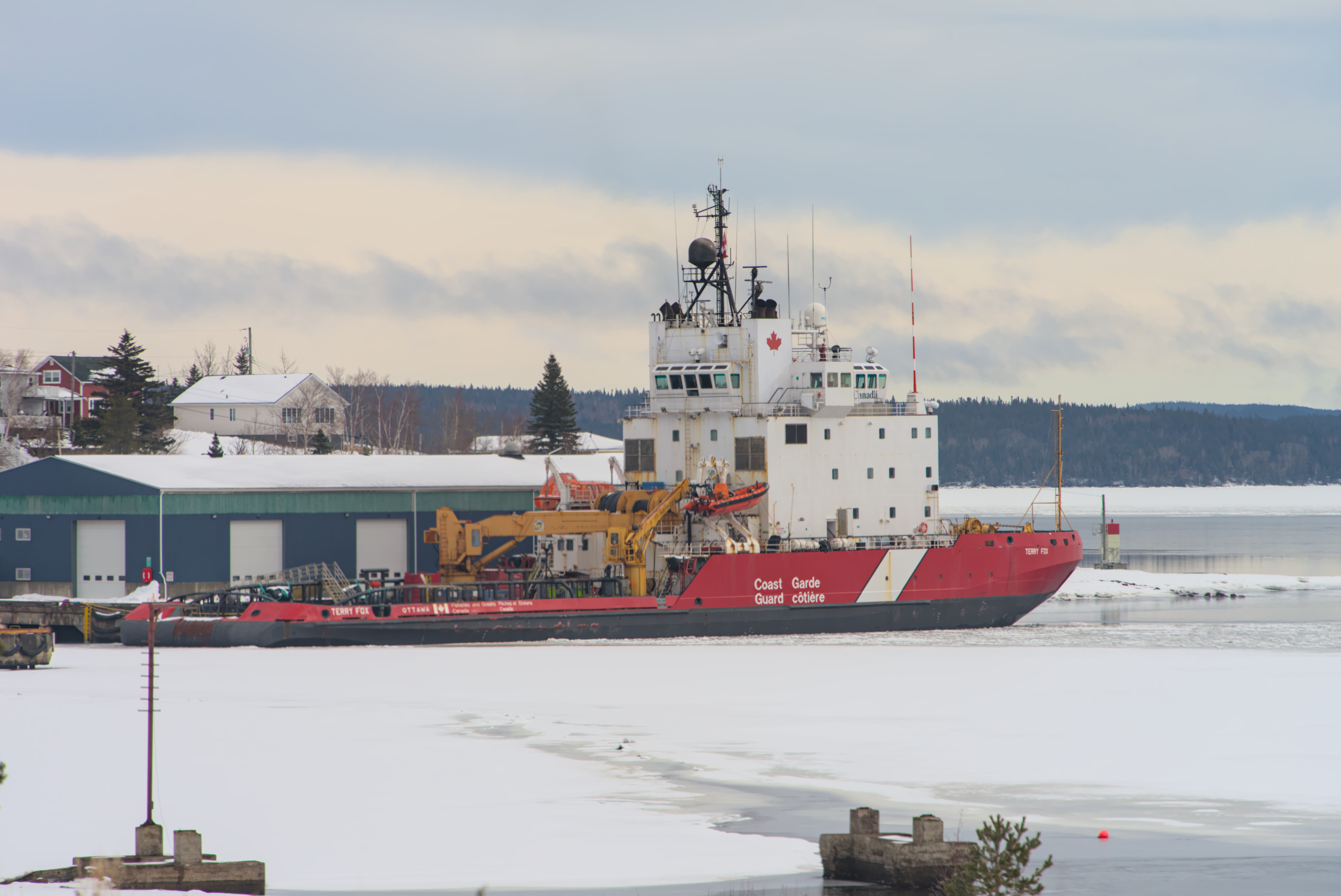
CCGS Terry Fox, as seen in Botwood, Newfoundland in 2022

Under the Canadian Coast Guard, CCGS Terry Fox is classified as a heavy icebreaker. She is homeported in St. John's, Newfoundland and Labrador and operates in the Gulf of St. Lawrence during the winter ice season and in Canada's eastern Arctic during the summer shipping season, assisting in escorting the annual Arctic summer sealift to coastal communities.

In 2014, Terry Fox and Louis S. St-Laurent travelled to the Canadian Arctic to map the undersea continental shelf. In August, they became the first Canadian government ships to reach the North Pole in 20 years.

Terry Fox ran aground in April 2018 near Bide Arm but managed to return to port under her own power.

The vessel's port side auxiliary diesel generator was damaged by fire on 16 August 2022, putting the icebreaker out of service until mid-September of the same year.

In June 2023, Terry Fox was among the Canadian Coast Guard ships that was deployed in the search efforts involved in the Titan submersible implosion.

While Terry Fox was originally scheduled for decommissioning already in 2020, she was instead decided to undergo a service life extension starting in late 2023, allowing her to remain in service until a replacement polar icebreaker built as part of the National Shipbuilding Strategy enters service. The $135 million refit, in which the original Stork-Werkspoor main diesel engines would be replaced by new Bergen units, was awarded to Heddle Shipyards (later Ontario Shipyards) at the former Port Weller Dry Docks site.

== See also ==
- History of the petroleum industry in Canada (frontier exploration and development)
