= Single steel drilling caisson =

Arctic offshore drilling unit

History
- Name: Ujigawa Maru (1972–1977); World Saga (1977–1982)
- Owner: Fawley Tankers Ltd (1977–1982)
- Port of registry: Monrovia, Liberia
- Builder: Kawasaki Heavy Industries, Sakaide, Japan
- Yard number: 1164
- Laid down: 21 July 1971
- Launched: 24 January 1972
- Completed: 20 April 1972
- Identification: IMO number: 7206471
- Fate: Converted to drilling unit

History
- Name: SSDC (1982–1997); SDC (1997–)
- Owner: Canadian Marine Drilling Ltd. (1982–1997); Seatankers Ltd (1997–2002); SDC Drilling Inc (2003–)
- Port of registry: Canada (1982–1997); Majuro, Marshall Islands (1997–2003); Monrovia, Liberia (2003–)
- Builder: Hitachi Zosen, Sakai, Japan
- Completed: 1982
- Identification: IMO number: 8755481
- Status: Cold stacked

General characteristics (tanker)
- Type: Crude oil tanker
- Tonnage: 105,334 GT; 89,198 NT; 232,134 DWT
- Length: 319.3 m (1,048 ft)
- Beam: 53 m (174 ft)
- Draught: 19.53 m (64 ft)
- Propulsion: Double reduction steam turbine; Single shaft; fixed pitch propeller
- Speed: 16 knots (30 km/h; 18 mph)

General characteristics (SSDC)
- Type: Drill barge
- Tonnage: 76,260 GT; 22,878 NT; 39,189 DWT
- Length: 162 m (531 ft)
- Beam: 53 m (174 ft)
- Depth: 25.3 m (83 ft)
- Installed power: 6 × Caterpillar D399 (6 × 1,000 hp)
- Propulsion: None
- Crew: Accommodation for 90

Single steel drilling caisson is a drill barge that was built for year-round oil exploration in shallow ice-covered waters in the Beaufort Sea. The unit, initially named SSDC and later shortened to SDC, was converted from an old oil tanker (Ujigawa Maru, later World Saga) in the early 1980s. It has been used to drill a total of eight oil wells on both Canadian and U.S. continental shelves, the most recent in 2006.

== Description ==
The hull of the single steel drilling caisson, which consists of the forward two thirds of the hull of a very large crude carrier, is 162 metres (531 ft) long and 53 metres (174 ft) wide, and measures 25.3 metres (83 ft) from keel to main deck. The original 80,000-tonne drilling unit sits on top of a 35,000-tonne 168 by 110 metres (551 by 361 ft) submersible barge that acts as an artificial steel berm when the unit is lowered to the seafloor using water ballast. While on location, a 2-metre (6.6 ft) box-type skirt prevents it from sliding sideways and an air injection system helps to overcome the suction effect during de-ballasting. The unit has six Caterpillar D399 diesel generators rated at 1,000 hp each for onboard power generation, but since it has no propulsion of its own, it has to be towed to location.

On the topside, the single steel drilling caisson has a standard 20,000 square feet land rig. The drilling mast and substructure have a rated capacity of 1,300,000 lbs and can be skidded to drill a well to the maximum depth of 25,000 feet (7,600 m) through any of the four moon pools. Internally, the drilling unit can hold enough supplies to drill three to five wells depending on the well depth. In addition to drilling equipment, the topside includes two cranes, a helicopter platform, and accommodation for 90 workers.

== History ==
=== 1971–1982 ===
Ujigawa Maru, the oil tanker that would one day be converted into an Arctic drilling unit, was built by Kawasaki Heavy Industries in Sakaide, Japan. The ship was laid down on 21 July 1971, launched on 24 January 1972 and completed on 20 April 1972. At 232,134 tons deadweight, the single-hulled Ujigawa Maru was classified as a very large crude carrier (VLCC) with an overall length of 319.3 metres (1,048 ft) and a beam of 53 metres (174 ft). The ship was propelled by a single fixed pitch propeller driven by a 36,000 hp (27,000 kW) double-reduction steam turbine, giving it a service speed of 16 knots (30 km/h; 18 mph).

In 1977, Ujigawa Maru was acquired by Fawley Tankers Ltd (today part of BW Group) and renamed World Saga.

=== 1982–2006 ===
In the early 1980s, Canadian Marine Drilling (Canmar), the drilling subsidiary of Dome Petroleum, purchased World Saga with the intention of converting the oil tanker to an ice-resistant mobile offshore drilling unit that could continue exploratory drilling operations in the Beaufort Sea beyond the short open-water season. Previously, the company had utilized drillships that had been winterized for arctic conditions, but existing mooring and dynamic positioning systems could not keep the vessel in place in moving first-year ice. This limited station-keeping ability shortened the drilling season in the Beaufort Sea to about 100 days which was not sufficient to drill and test a typical well within one summer season. An alternative approach was to use artificial islands, either dredged islands with gradually sloping sides or sand-filled concrete structures resting on a subsea gravel berm. While caisson-retained islands were considered to be the most appropriate and cost-effective way to extend the drilling season in the Beaufort Sea, relocating them was time-consuming and expensive as the structure had to be completely reconstructed every time it was moved to a new drilling location. The new drilling unit was intended to overcome these limitations.

World Saga was taken to Hitachi Zosen shipyard in Sakai, Japan, where all but the forward two-thirds of the tanker's hull were scrapped. The remaining section was reinforced with 7,000 tonnes of additional steel and strengthened against ice with 13,000 tonnes of concrete that formed a 1-metre (3.3 ft) thick inner hull. A new 4,000-ton topside with drilling derrick, cranes, helipad and accommodation block was installed on top of the ice-strengthened hull. The drilling unit was given the name SSDC, short for single steel drilling caisson.

After the conversion was complete, SSDC was towed to the Bering Sea. In October 1982, the drilling unit arrived to Dome Petroleum's Uviluk P-66 site and was lowered onto a man-made submerged berm in 31 metres (102 ft) of water. The drilling began on 10 November and was completed on 21 May 1983. By January 1983, a grounded ice rubble pile had formed around the SSDC, protecting it from direct ice contact.

During the winter of 1983–1984, SSDC was used to drill an exploratory well at the Kogyuk N-67 site for Gulf Canada Resources Ltd. in 28 metres (92 ft) of water. On 25 September 1983, before the drilling had begun, the unit was impacted by a multi-year ice floe with an estimated diameter of 1.7 kilometres (1.1 mi) and thickness of 3 to 4 metres (9.8 to 13.1 ft). While the impact was clearly felt on the rig, no structural damage or movement relative to the seafloor was detected. The drilling of the well began on 28 October 1983 and was completed on 30 January 1984. On 25 June 1984, during the ice break-up, SSDC was impacted again by a large second-year ice floe, estimated to be 24 by 13 kilometres (14.9 by 8.1 mi) in size and 1.5 to 2 metres (4.9 to 6.6 ft) in thickness. During the winter, a grounded rubble field had again formed around the unit, shielding it from the colliding ice floe.

Wells drilled by SSDC in the Beaufort Sea.

After the first two seasons, it was found out that constructing a perfectly flat underwater gravel berm at every drilling location was very time-consuming. In August 1986, before being deployed in the American part of the Beaufort Sea, SSDC was mated with a submersible barge named MAT built by Hitachi Zosen. A layer of high density polyurethane foam between the two units ensured an even contact. The use of artificial steel berm removed the need to prepare the seafloor for drilling operations and made the unit capable of operating year-round in water depths between 7 and 24 metres (23 and 79 ft) and in a wide variety of soil conditions. SSDC and MAT have not been separated since.

In September 1986, SSDC was deployed at the Phoenix site in Harrison Bay, Alaska. The water depth was 17.5 metres (57 ft) and the top of the MAT was 4 metres (13 ft) below surface. Drilling of the well for Tenneco Oil Exploration Company began on 23 September and ended on 19 December 1986. In the following year, the rig was moved to the Aurora site, where it drilled another well for Tenneco in 21 metres (69 ft) of water between 2 November 1987 and 30 August 1988. Afterwards, SSDC was towed back to Canadian waters and stored in the sheltered waters of Thetis Bay near Herschel Island for two winters.

In 1990, SSDC returned to the Alaska and began drilling a well for ARCO Alaska at the Fireweed site in 15 metres (50 ft) of water on 19 October 1990. The well was finished on 25 December 1990 and already on 11 January 1991 a second well for ARCO Alaska was spud at the Cabot site in 17 metres (55 ft) of water. After the well was completed on 26 February 1992, SSDC was placed in long-term storage ("cold stacked") at Port Clarence, Alaska, where it would not be trapped in Beaufort Sea ice if work could be found elsewhere. The Cabot well was also the last one drilled by SSDC under Canadian ownership. In 1997, Amoco sold Canmar's former fleet of drilling units and offshore icebreakers to an international consortium of shipping companies. The drilling unit was re-registered to Marshall Islands and its name was shortened to SDC. The submersible barge MAT was also renamed SDC II.

Ten years later, SDC was recommissioned to drill an exploratory well for Encana Oil & Gas at the McCovey prospect off Alaska. After a month and a half of preparations, the rig was towed back to the Beaufort Sea in July 2002 by two icebreakers, Arctic Kalvik and Kigoria, which completed the 600-nautical-mile (1,100 km; 690 mi) tow from Port Clarence in just 12 days. The preparations for the winter were stopped on 15 August for about two months to avoid disturbing the bowhead whaling season. Drilling of the well, located in only 11 metres (35 ft) of water, began on 6 December 2002 and was completed on 27 January 2003. With no immediate drilling work available for SDC, the rig was towed to Thetis Bay where it had previously been stored for two winters. In 2003, the ownership of the drilling unit was passed to a Liberian-registered company, SDC Drilling Inc, and both SDC and SDC II were reflagged to Liberia.

Few years later, Devon Canada chose SDC over artificial islands to drill the first wildcat well in the Canadian Beaufort Sea in 17 years. However, the last remaining vessels of the original Beaufort Sea offshore fleet had been sold overseas few years earlier, and the company had to charter the Russian icebreaker Vladimir Ignatyuk (the former Arctic Kalvik) all the way from Murmansk to complete the one-day tow from Thetis Bay anchorage to the Paktoa C-60 site. Initially, the plan was to drill one well in during the winter of 2005–2006 and, depending on the results, continue with three more wells during the next three winters. However, despite encouraging results, the well drilled between 5 December 2005 and 19 March 2006 in 13 metres (43 ft) of water did not strike the multi-trillion-cubic-foot gas reservoir Devon was looking for, and the subsequent wells were cancelled. SDC was towed back to its anchorage at Thetis Bay.

=== Current status ===
Since 2006, SDC has been cold stacked off Herschel Island, Canada. The rig can be seen in satellite photographs at approximately 69.411600°N 138.897287°W.

The mothballed single steel drilling caisson SDC is the last remaining complete drilling unit built for oil exploration in the Beaufort sea in the 1980s. The two other bottom-founded units, the concrete island drilling system (CIDS) Glomar Beaufort Sea I and the mobile arctic caisson (MAC) Molikpaq, have been converted to production platforms in Sakhalin, Russia, and the floating conical drilling unit (CDU) Kulluk was sold for scrap after drifting aground off Sitkalidak Island in the Gulf of Alaska in 2012. Furthermore, in 2017 ConocoPhillips completed the removal of the Tarsiut caissons which had been stored in Thetis Bay since 1984. The empty steel caisson of Esso's caisson-retained island (CRI) is also being scrapped at Tuktoyaktuk as of 2026.

== See also ==
- History of the petroleum industry in Canada (frontier exploration and development)
- Petroleum exploration in the Arctic
