= CCGS John A. Macdonald =

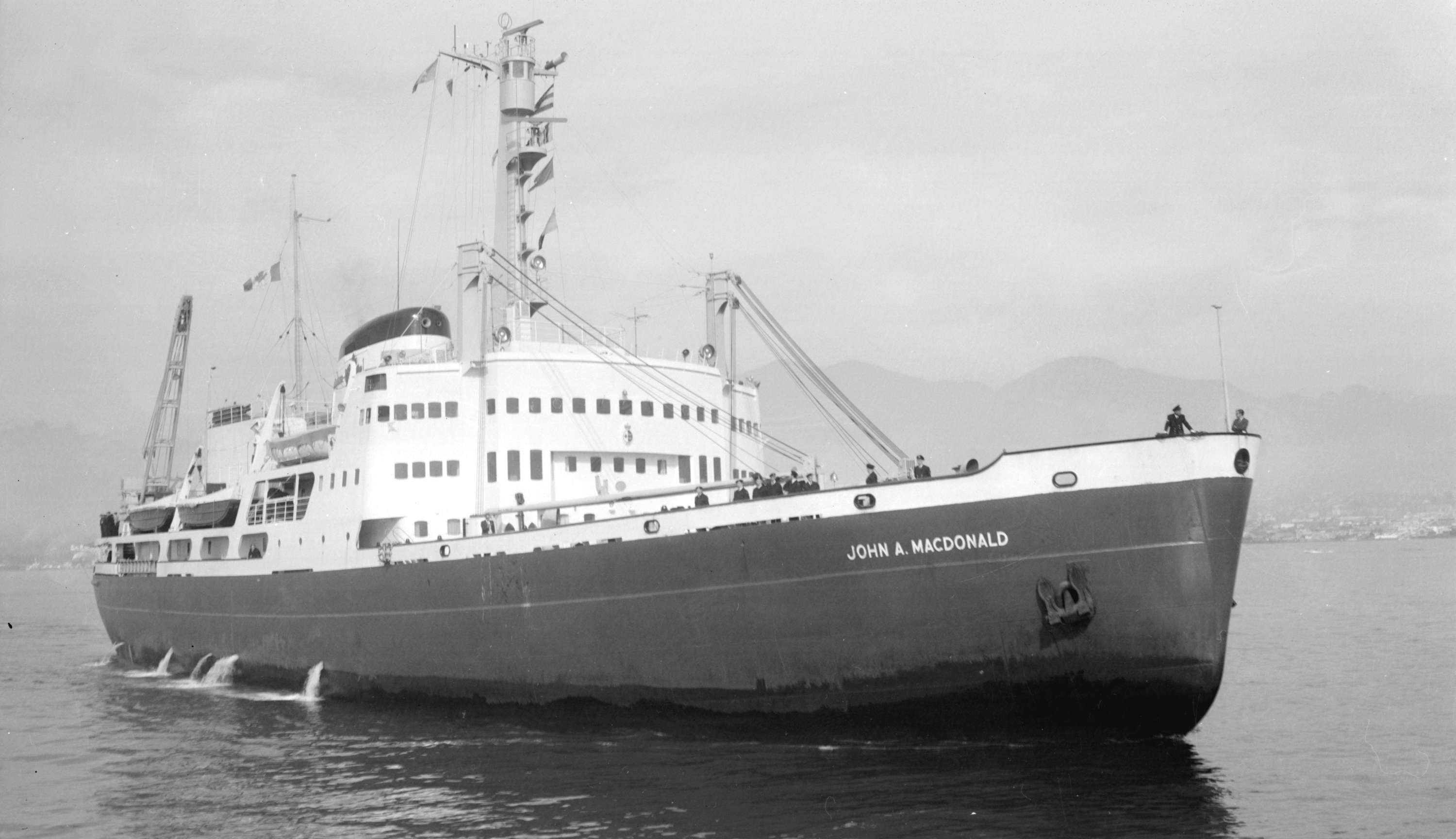
- CCGS John A. Macdonald in 1967

History

Canada
- Name: John A. Macdonald
- Namesake: Sir John A. Macdonald, 1st Prime Minister of Canada
- Operator: Canadian Coast Guard
- Builder: Davie Shipbuilding, Lauzon, Quebec
- Yard number: 620
- Launched: 31 October 1959
- Commissioned: September 1960
- Decommissioned: 1991
- Refit: 1987
- Stricken: 1991
- Home port: Dartmouth, Nova Scotia
- Identification: IMO number: 5173125
- Honours and awards: U.S. Coast Guard Unit Commendation 1967
- Fate: Scrapped in 1995

General characteristics
- Type: Heavy icebreaker
- Tonnage: 6,186 GRT
- Displacement: 9,160 long tons (9,310 t) full load
- Length: 315 ft (96 m)
- Beam: 70 ft (21 m)
- Draught: 28 ft (8.5 m)
- Propulsion: Diesel-electric; three shafts; 15,000 shp (11,000 kW)
- Speed: 15.5 knots (28.7 km/h; 17.8 mph)
- Aircraft carried: 2 helicopters

CCGS John A. Macdonald (Note: CCGS stands for Canadian Coast Guard Ship) was a Canadian Coast Guard heavy icebreaker. She was named after The Right Honourable, Sir John Alexander Macdonald, the first Prime Minister of Canada. The ship was commissioned into the Canadian Department of Transport's Marine Service in 1960 using the prefix "Canadian Government Ship" (CGS). The vessel was transferred in 1962 into the newly created Canadian Coast Guard (CCG) and served with distinction until being decommissioned in 1991, and replaced by the then-chartered (but later purchased) CCGS Terry Fox.

== Design and description ==
Considered one of the finest icebreakers ever constructed for the Canadian service, John A. Macdonald was 315 feet (96 m) long overall with a beam of 70 feet (21 m) and a draught of 28 feet (8.5 m). The vessel had a fully loaded displacement of 9,160 long tons (9,310 t) and had a gross register tonnage (GRT) of 6,186 tons.

The ship was propelled by three screws driven by a diesel-electric system creating 15,000 shaft horsepower (11,000 kW). This gave the vessel a maximum speed of 15.5 knots (28.7 km/h; 17.8 mph). The vessel could carry two helicopters.

== Service history ==
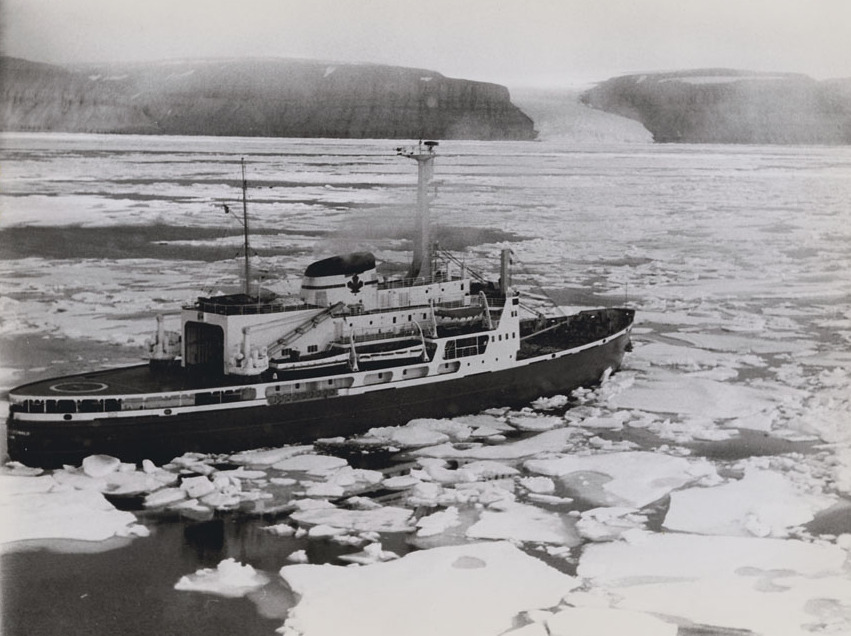
CCGS John A. Macdonald off Burnett Inlet

The vessel was constructed by Davie Shipbuilding at their yard in Lauzon, Quebec with the yard number 620 and launched on 31 October 1959. (Note: The Miramar Ship Index and Jane's Fighting Ships disagree on the exact date, with Miramar claiming 31 October and Jane's, 3 October) During construction, the vessel was visited by Soviet officials who took interest in her design. There was a distinct resemblance to John A. MacDonald in the five ships in the next class of Soviet icebreaker, though they were larger and more powerful. The vessel entered service as part of the government fleet in September 1960 as CGS John A. Macdonald.

In 1962, John A. Macdonald transferred to the newly created Canadian Coast Guard and set a record by reaching Tanquary Fjord, the closest to the North Pole a Canadian vessel had ever been. In 1967, John A. Macdonald transited the Northwest Passage in order to aid the smaller icebreaker CCGS Camsell in the western Arctic. Following that, the icebreaker then travelled to assist USCGC Northwind after the United States Coast Guard vessel became trapped in heavy ice north of Point Barrow, Alaska. The vessel then returned to the East Coast via the Panama Canal, circumnavigating North America in the process. John A Macdonald was awarded the U.S. Coast Guard Unit Commendation "for extremely meritorious service in the support of United States Coast Guard operations during the period of 23 September 1967 to 08 October 1967", during the Arctic West Summer 1967 cruise by Admiral Willard J. Smith, Commandant, United States Coast Guard.

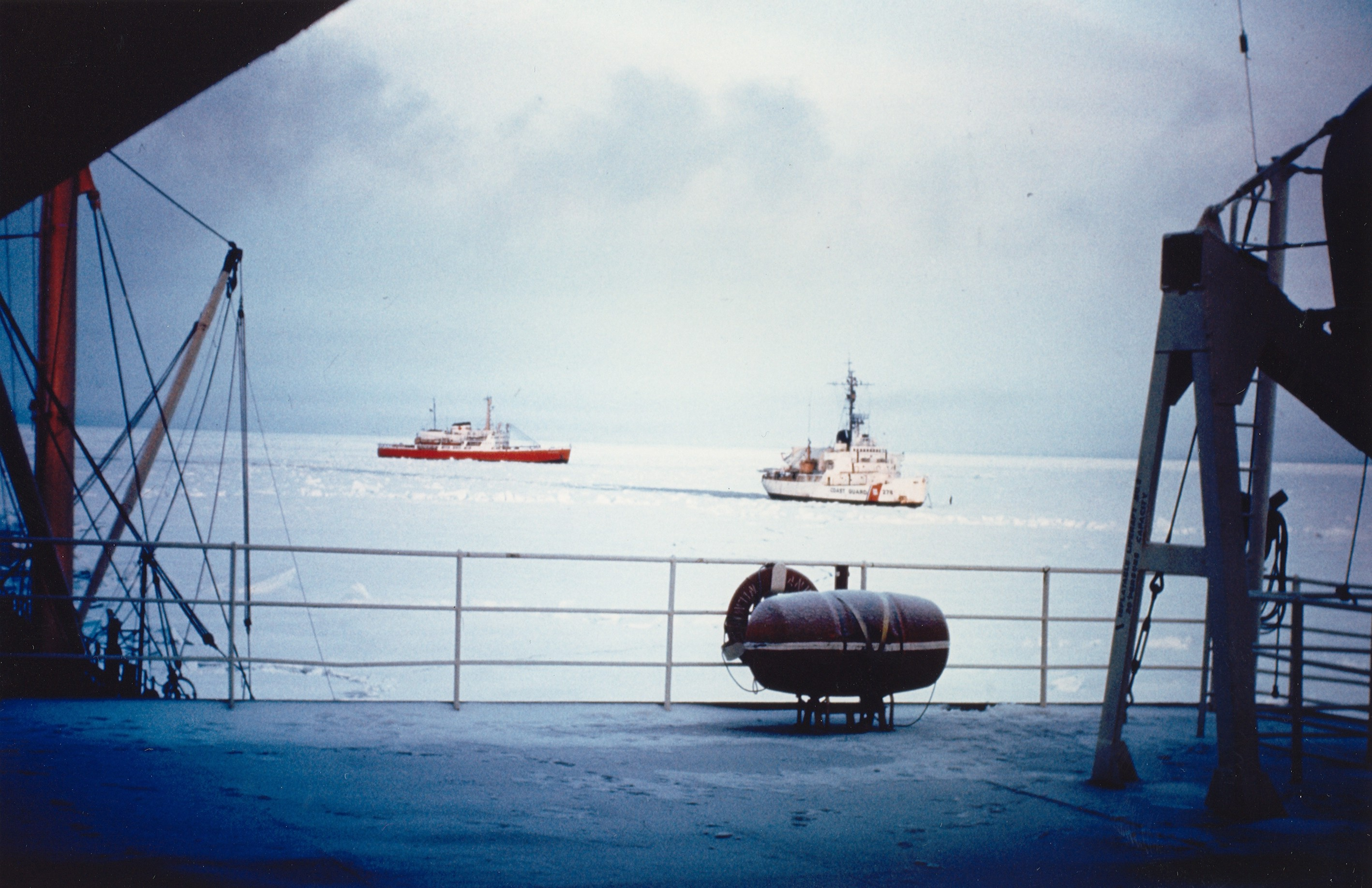
CCGS John A. Macdonald (red ship at left) in the Northwest Passage, 1969

In 1969 John A. Macdonald assisted the then-new CCGS Louis S. St-Laurent in rescuing SS Manhattan during her transit of the Northwest Passage. John A. Macdonald made a double transit from the east to west and returned west to east. During the rescue, John A. Macdonald broke her starboard propeller in heavy ice; the propeller is on display by the Dartmouth Ferry Terminal, Dartmouth, Nova Scotia. John A. Macdonald was assisted by the United States Coast Guard icebreakers Northwind and Staten Island

In 1974 the merchant vessel Atlantean I was damaged on Les Escoumins, received repairs at Montreal and Quebec City and failed to pay for them. An order of arrest was produced but the vessel sailed without authorization. In February 1975, the Gulf of St. Lawrence was filled with ice and John A. MacDonald was sent to intercept the ship, now renamed Answer. Stuck in ice and boarded by lawyers bearing the warrants, the captain of the merchant vessel refused to sail for Gaspé, Quebec. On 28 February, Royal Canadian Mounted Police and Canadian Coast Guard personnel were placed on board the merchant and the two ships sailed for Sept-Îles, Quebec. However, as soon as Answer was free of the heavy ice, the ship broke escort and fled for the Atlantic. After legal arguments were heard over the right of Canada to seize the vessel, the ship was boarded a third time, the crew taken off and Answer and John A. Macdonald arrived at Sept-Îles on 7 March.

Also in 1975, John A. Macdonald made a partial transit of the Northwest Passage, westward, through Lancaster Sound, Peel Sound and Victoria Strait, and sailed to aid CCGS Camsell again after the smaller Coast Guard ship was damaged in the Western Arctic. In 1977, the ship was chartered to Dome Petroleum. During 1978 John A. Macdonald made an east to west partial transit of the Northwest Passage, traveling on charter to Dome Petroleum, through Lancaster Sound, Prince of Wales Strait and the Beaufort Sea. During the winter of 1978–79, the vessel was laid up. In 1979, the vessel made another partial transit of the Northwest Passage, west to east, returning eastward from a charter operation. John A. Macdonald returned to Coast Guard service in 1980 and supported the search that confirmed the wreck of Breadalbane, which had been crushed by ice and sank in the Arctic Ocean in 1853. The following year, John A. Macdonald escorted a factory barge to Little Cornwallis Island where the barge was beached and incorporated into the island.

During 1985 John A. Macdonald made a further partial transit of the Northwest Passage traveling westward, through Peel Sound, Victoria Strait, Amundsen Gulf and back. That year, the icebreaker was sent to escort USCGC Polar Sea through Canadian waters as far as Viscount Melville Sound during the American vessel's unauthorized transit through waters claimed by Canada. In 1987 she underwent an eight-month, $8-million (CAD) refit. In 1988 the ship made another partial transit of the Northwest Passage traveling westward, through Lancaster Sound, Peel Sound and Demarcation Point then back. In November–December 1989, the Canadian Coast Guard went on strike and John A. Macdonald was the only Coast Guard vessel to remain at sea, escorting MV Arctic to Nanisivik.

The ship was taken out of service in 1991. The vessel was replaced by Terry Fox, initially on charter to the Canadian Coast Guard, which was later purchased. The vessel was transferred to Crown Assets and was renamed 1201. The ship was then sold for scrap in 1993 and broken up in 1995.

== Awards and honours ==
- U.S. Coast Guard Unit Commendation, 1967
