= MV Camilla Desgagnés =

Ship built in 1982

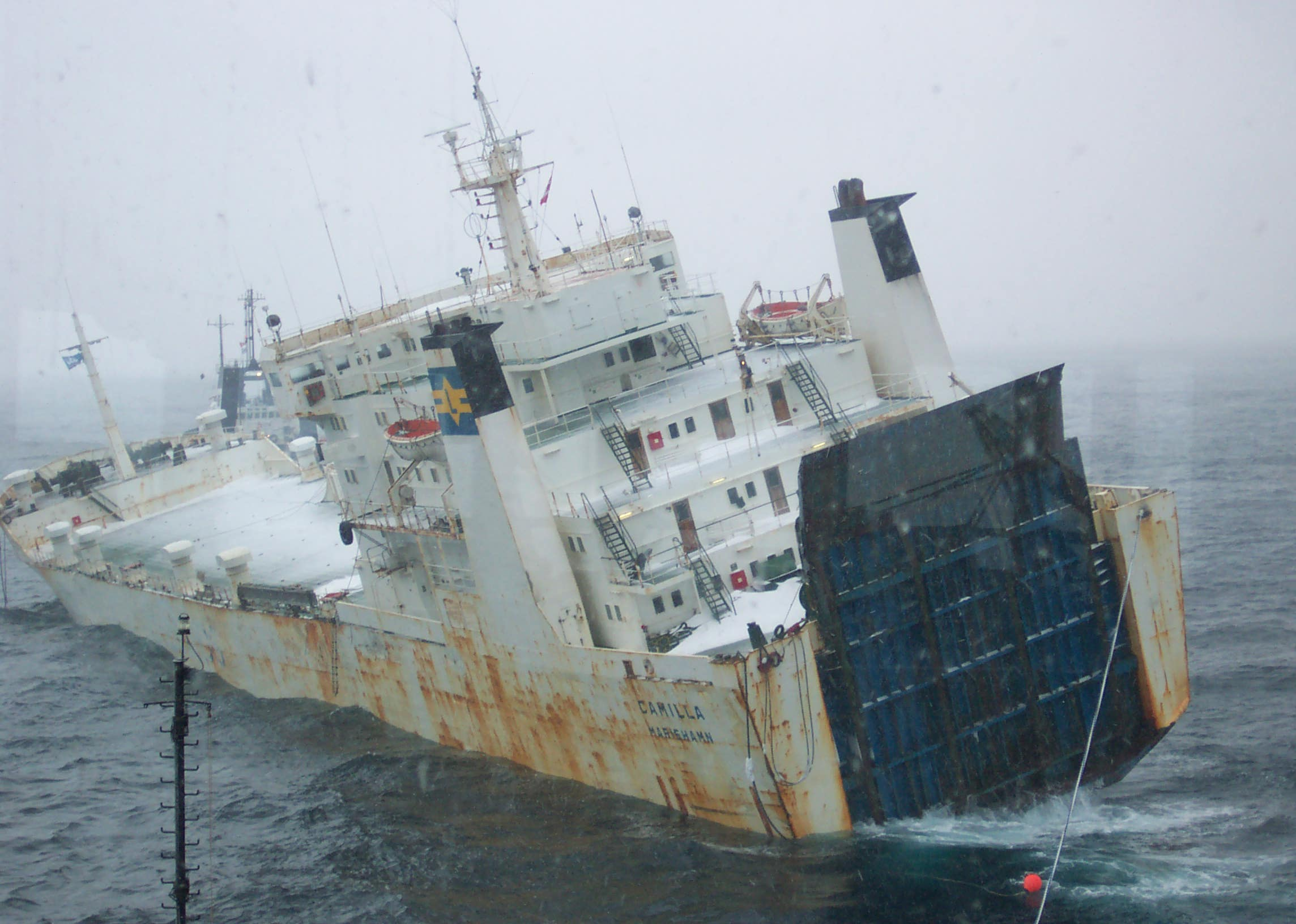
- The abandoned Camilla about 200 miles off Newfoundland as she was taken in tow.

History
- Name: Camilla D (2017 onwards); Camilla Desgagnes (as fr. Camilla Desgagnés) (2004–2017); Camilla (1982–2004)
- Owner: Desgagnés Transarctik Inc
- Operator: Groupe Desgagnés
- Port of registry: 1982–2003: Mariehamn, Finland; 2003–2004: Bridgetown, Barbados; 2004–2017: Quebec, Canada; 2017 onwards: Basseterre, Saint Kitts and Nevis
- Builder: Kroegerwerft
- Yard number: 1506
- Laid down: 1982
- Launched: February 17, 1982
- Completed: July 1982
- Identification: Call sign: V4SR3; IMO number: 8100595; MMSI number: 341461000
- Fate: Scrapped in 2022 at Alang, India

General characteristics
- Class & type: Ro-ro ferry
- Tonnage: 7,000 DWT (as built)
- Length: 133 m (436 ft)
- Beam: 20.06 m (65.8 ft)
- Draught: 6.865 m (22.52 ft)
- Ice class: 1A Super
- Installed power: MAK 6M43C of 5,700 kW at 525 RPM, originally Stork-Werkspoor 12 TM 410 R of 5,735 kW

MV Camilla D was a St Kitts and Nevis cargo vessel that has operated since 2003 in the waters of eastern and Arctic Canada. Before that, the ship was sailing under the Finnish flag as MS Camilla, owned by Lundqvist Rederierna of Mariehamn, Åland Islands. The ship was built by Krögerwerft GmbH in Rendsburg, West Germany in 1982. As the ship operated out of Finnish and Baltic ports in winter mainly without icebreaker assistance, she has the highest Finnish-Swedish ice class of 1A Super. The vessel was beached on May 28, 2022, at Alang, India for demolition.

== 2003 salvage ==
On May 1, 2002, Camilla was laid up in the port of Mariehamn, Finland. According to the Finnish investigation report, maintenance work on the ship was intended to be carried out during the lay-up, but did not actually take place. On December 31, 2002 the ship departed Mariehamn for Canada in ballast for a cargo of paper. During the sailing, it was noticed that the ship's fuel had been contaminated with water, requiring a transition to burning light oil, and that engine lubrication oil required continuous filtering. The exhaust valves of the main engine also saw attention many times during the trip. After loading her cargo in Dalhousie, New Brunswick, Canada, the ship left for England on January 19, 2003. On Jan 23rd 05:40z the main engine stopped at sea, causing a black out. The engine failed with alarms and was restarted several times each time with some increasingly worrying signs of disrepair. At 09:36z it was discovered that one of the crank shaft bearings was overheating with mechanical noise emerging from several of the cylinders. At 10:45z the engine was declared inoperative. The engineers initially set out to repair the engine, but the master's decision at 13.48z that the ship would be evacuated halted the work. A hurricane was closing in, the repairs would take up to 36 hours, and even in the best case the ship's propulsion would be limited. The ship was then at 46°54.7′N 46°50.9′W and rolling 30-40 degrees. The crew ate dinner, closed all the hatches and valves and prepared to leave the ship. The ship's Stork-Werkspoor engine type was deemed in the Finnish investigation report to be very sensitive to the quality of its lubrication oil owing to a design feature, and the type had also received a general design revision to the crank rod bearings and the connecting rods. The engine type was also known to collect sticky oily residue in the general crankshaft area even when carefully maintained. The engine on board Camilla had both unrevised and revised parts installed, but the parts to fail were all of the unrevised design. The investigation board concluded that the most probable cause for the engine break down was imperfect lubrication of the main engine. The imperfect lubrication was a result of several factors, as detailed in the full report.

Camilla was abandoned after her 17-person crew was rescued from the ship by the Canadian Coast Guard and the Canadian Forces in January 2003 off Newfoundland following extreme weather. This rescue became the subject of an installment of the 2007 National Geographic Channel documentary series Trapped.

Titan Salvage partnered with International Transport Contractors to salvage Camilla. ITC tugboat Kigoria and Secunda Marine tugboat Ryan Leet secured the vessel on January 30, 2003 while Camilla was heeling 20 degrees to port and rolling 40 degrees to port. The vessel was towed to sheltered waters on the Newfoundland coast before being moved to St. John's for delivery to her owners.

The ship was sold at that time to Groupe Desgagnés of Quebec who renamed her Camilla Desgagnés.

== 2005 fire ==
On June 8, 2005 the vessel reported an engine room fire off New York City. Disabled, the owners contracted Titan Salvage who had originally salvaged the vessel in 2003. The vessel's crew contained the fire and Titan Salvage sub-contracted McAllister Towing to move the Camilla Desgagnés to Port Elizabeth, New Jersey where it was safely returned to the owners on June 10, 2005.

== 2008 transit of the Northwest Passage ==
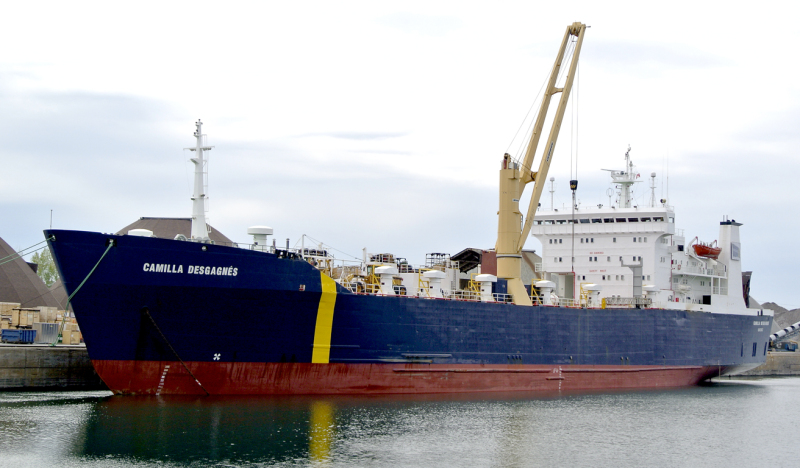
The Camilla Desgagnés loading cargo at Cote St. Catherine, on the St. Lawrence Seaway.

Camilla Desgagnés was said to have become the first commercial vessel to transit the Northwest Passage, carrying cargo to several hamlets in September 2008. SS Manhattan, an oil tanker retrofitted with an icebreaker bow, demonstrated a transit in 1969 and in 1970, carrying a token barrel of crude oil.

On November 28, 2008, the Canadian Broadcasting Corporation reported that the Canadian Coast Guard confirmed the first commercial ship sailed through the Northwest Passage. In September 2008, MV Camilla Desgagnés, owned by Desgagnés Transarctik Inc. and, along with the Arctic Cooperative, is part of Nunavut Sealift and Supply Incorporated (NSSI), transported cargo from Montreal to the hamlets of Cambridge Bay, Kugluktuk, Gjoa Haven and Taloyoak. A member of the crew is reported to have said that "there was no ice whatsoever". Shipping from the east is to resume in the fall of 2009. Although sealift is an annual feature of the Canadian Arctic this is the first time that the western communities have been serviced from the east. The western portion of the Canadian Arctic is normally supplied by Northern Transportation Company Limited (NTCL) from Hay River. The eastern portion by NNSI and NTCL from Churchill and Montreal.

== Demolition (2022) ==
The vessel was beached May 28, 2022, at Alang for demolition.

== Sources ==
- Finnish Safety Investigation Authority, report B1/2003M "Ms CAMILLA, vaaratilanne ja aluksen evakuointi Pohjois-Atlantilla 23.1.2003", published Helsinki November 11, 2004 Ms CAMILLA, vaaratilanne ja aluksen evakuointi Pohjois- Atlantilla 23.1.2003
