= Tschudi Group =

Norwegian shipping company

Tschudi Shipping Company AS
- Type: Private
- Industry: Shipping
- Founded: 1883
- Headquarters: Oslo, Norway
- Area served: Norway
- Parent: Tschudi family
- Website: www.tschudigroup.com

The Tschudi Group is a private shipping and logistics company, established in 1883. The company is now owned and run by the fourth and fifth generations of the Tschudi family. The head office is located in Lysaker, Norway.

The Group's main commercial competences are shipping and maritime services, logistics and offshore support. The Group is active in ship management, offering commercial, technical management and crewing services to third party clients.

The Tschudi Group has offices in Norway, Finland, Denmark, Sweden, the Netherlands, Estonia, Germany, Ukraine, Poland, Cyprus, Portugal, Madeira, Mozambique and is represented by an agent in China. The Group is well represented with strong teams in many countries and business areas, but has a particular stronghold in the Nordic countries, the Baltic and Continental Europe.
