= History of the petroleum industry in Canada (frontier exploration and development) =

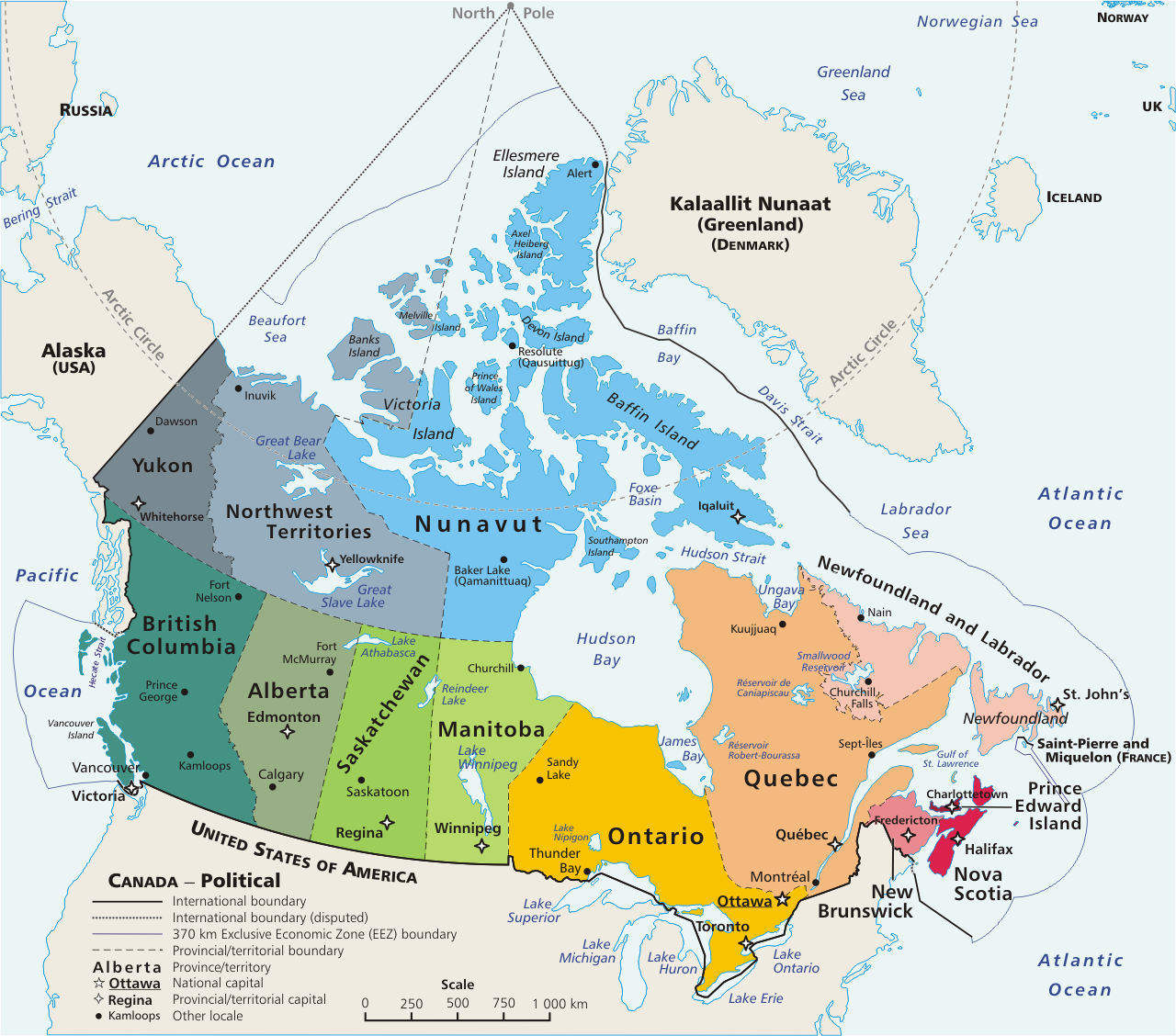
This geopolitical map of Canada shows the ten provinces and three territories. Some petroleum production takes place today in every province and territory but Prince Edward Island and Nunavut. Today's oil and gas frontiers are in the territories and in the offshore regions of Atlantic Canada and British Columbia.

Canada's early petroleum discoveries took place near population centres or along lines of penetration into the frontier.

The first oil play, for example, was in southern Ontario. The first western natural gas discovery occurred on a Canadian Pacific Railway right-of-way. The site of the first discovery in the far north, the 1920 Norman Wells, Northwest Territories wildcat, was along the Mackenzie River, at that time the great transportation corridor into Canada's Arctic.

From those haphazard beginnings the search for petroleum spread to the fringes of continental Canada – and beyond those fringes onto the ocean-covered continental shelves.

Exploration in those areas involves huge machines, complex logistical support systems, and large volumes of capital. Offshore wells in the Canadian sector of the Beaufort Sea have cost more than $100 million. Across the International border, a well drilled in the US sector of the Beaufort – Mukluk by name – cost $1.5 billion, and came up dry.

For the petroleum sector, Canada's geographical frontiers are the petroleum basins in northern Canada, in the Canadian Arctic Archipelago, and off the coast of Atlantic Canada. These areas are difficult and expensive to explore and develop, but successful projects can be profitable using known production technology.

As the world's onshore oil reserves deplete, offshore resources – in Canada, also known as frontier resources – become increasingly important. Those resources in turn complete the full cycle of exploration, development, production and depletion.

Some frontier crude oil production – for example, Bent Horn in the Arctic and the Panuke discovery offshore Nova Scotia – have already been shut down after completing their productive lives. Similarly, some natural gas fields in the frontiers are now in later stages of decline.

In part, this history illustrates how important changes take place in the economies of newly producing regions, as frontier exploration shifts from wildcat drilling through oil and gas development into production. It also explores the ingenuity needed to drill in those inhospitable areas, and the deadly challenges explorers sometimes face.

== True North ==
=== Norman Wells ===
Northern Canada, defined politically. The northern petroleum frontiers include the Beaufort Sea, the Canadian Arctic Archipelago and the long-established Norman Wells oil fields.

The first great story in Canada's exploration of the geographical frontiers is that of Norman Wells in the Northwest Territories. During his voyage of discovery down the Mackenzie River to the Arctic Ocean in 1789, Sir Alexander Mackenzie noted in his journal that he had seen oil seeping from the river's bank. R.G. McConnell of the Geological Survey of Canada confirmed these seepages in 1888. In 1914, British geologist Dr. T.O. Bosworth staked three claims near the spot. Imperial Oil acquired the claims and in 1918–1919 sent two geologists of its own, and they recommended drilling.

Led by a geologist, a crew composed of six drillers and an ox (Old Nig by name) later began a six-week, 1,900 kilometres (1,200 mi) journey northward by railway, riverboat and foot to the site now known as Norman Wells. They found oil – largely by luck, it turned out later – after Ted Link, later Imperial Oil's chief geologist, waved his arm grandly and said: "Drill anywhere around here." The crew began digging into the permafrost with pick and shovel, unable to put their cable tool rig into operation until they had cleared away the mixture of frozen mud and ice. At about the 30 metres (98 ft) level they encountered their first oil show. By this time, the river ice had frozen to 1.5 m (4.9 ft) and the mercury had plunged to −40 °C (−40 °F). The crew decided to give up and wait out the winter. They survived, but their ox did not. Old Nig provided many a meal during the long, cold winter.

Drilling resumed in the spring and a relief crew arrived in July. Some of the original crew stayed around to help the newcomers continue drilling. On August 23, 1920, they struck oil at 240 m (790 ft). The world's most northerly oil well had come in. In succeeding months, Imperial drilled three more holes – two successful, one dry. The company also installed enough equipment to refine the crude oil into a type of fuel oil for use by church missions and fishing boats along the Mackenzie. But the refinery and oil field closed in 1921 because northern markets were too small to justify the costly operations. Norman Wells marked another important milestone when in 1921 Imperial flew two all-metal 185 horsepower (138 kW) Junkers airplanes to the site. These aircraft were among the first of the legendary bush planes which helped to develop the north, and forerunners of today's commercial northern air transport.

A small oil refinery using Norman Wells oil opened in 1936 to supply the Eldorado Mine at Great Bear Lake, but the field did not take a significant place in history again until after the United States entered World War II.

This discovery indirectly contributed to post-war exploration in Alberta, and the decision to drill Leduc No. 1. Like Leduc, the Norman Wells discovery was drilled into a Devonian reef. After the Second World War, Imperial identified what it thought might be the same kind of structure in Alberta, and consequently located the great Leduc oil field.

Canol: When Japan captured a pair of Aleutian Islands, Americans became concerned about the safety of their oil tanker routes to Alaska and began looking for an inland oil supply safe from attack. They negotiated with Canada to build a refinery at Whitehorse in the Yukon, with crude oil to come by pipeline from Norman Wells. If tank trucks had tried to haul the oil to Alaska, they would have eaten up most of their own load over the vast distance.

This spectacular project, dubbed the Canol Road – a contraction of "Canadian" and "oil" – took 20 months, 25,000 men, 10 million tonnes (9.8 million long tons or 11 million short tons) of equipment, 1,600 km (990 mi) each of road, and telegraph line and 2,575 km (1,600 mi) of pipeline. The pipeline network consisted of the 950 km (590 mi) crude oil line from Norman Wells to the Whitehorse refinery. From there, three lines carried products to Skagway and Fairbanks in Alaska, and to Watson Lake, Yukon. Meanwhile, Imperial was drilling more wells. The test for the Norman Wells oil field came when the pipeline was ready on February 16, 1944. The field surpassed expectations. During the one year remaining of the Pacific war, the field produced about 160,000 m³ (1.4 million barrels) of oil.

The total cost of the project (all paid by U.S. taxpayers) was $134 million, in 1943 U.S. dollars. Total crude production was 315,000 m³ (2.7 million barrels) of which 7,313 m³ (63,000 barrels) were spilled. The cost of the crude oil was $426 per cubic metre ($67.77 per barrel). Refined petroleum product output was just 138,000 m³ (1.2 million barrels). Cost per barrel of refined product was thus $975 per cubic metre, or 97.5 cents per litre ($3.69 a gallon). Adjusted to current dollars using the U.S. consumer price index, in 2000 dollars the oil would have cost $4,214 per cubic metre ($670 a barrel), while the refined product would have been worth an astonishing $9.62 a litre ($36.42 a gallon).

After the war, there was no use for the Canol pipeline. It simply fell out of use, with pipe and other equipment lying abandoned. The Whitehorse refinery kept on going – in a different locale. Imperial bought it for $1, took it apart, moved it to Edmonton, Alberta and reassembled it like a gigantic jigsaw puzzle to handle production from the fast-developing Leduc oil field near Devon.

The Norman Wells story is not yet complete. The field entered its most important phase in the mid-1980s, when a pipeline connected the field to the Canada-wide crude oil pipeline system. Oil began flowing south in 1985.

Northern Canada (depicted to the left) on a map of the polar region. There are three ways to describe the Arctic. One is the area above the Arctic Circle. Another is the northern region which is barren of trees. The third is the area where average daily temperatures in July are 10 °C (50 °F) or lower – in this isothermic map, the area circumscribed by the red line.

Norman Wells was a frontier discovery. It was not Arctic exploration, however, since it was located south of the Arctic Circle and also outside the narrowly defined Arctic environment (see map).

The definitive push into the Arctic took place in 1957 when Western Minerals and a small exploration company called Peel Plateau Exploration drilled the first well in the Yukon. To provision the well, some 800 km (500 mi) from Whitehorse at Eagle Plains, Peel Plateau hauled 2,600 tonnes (2,559 L/T or 2,866 S/T) of equipment and supplies by tractor train. This achievement involved eight tractors and 40 sleighs per train, for a total of seven round trips. Drilling continued in 1958, but the company eventually declared the well dry and abandoned. Over the next two decades, however, Arctic exploration gained momentum.

=== Arctic frontiers ===
Stirrings of interest in the Canadian Arctic Archipelago (Arctic Islands) as a possible site of petroleum reserves came as a result of "Operation Franklin," a 1955 study of Arctic geology directed by Yves Fortier under the auspices of the Geological Survey of Canada. This and other surveys confirmed the presence of thick layers of sediment containing a variety of possible hydrocarbon traps.

Petroleum companies applied to the Government of Canada for permission to explore these remote lands in 1959, before the government had begun regulating such exploration. The immediate result was delay. In 1960, the Diefenbaker government passed regulations, then granted exploration permits for 160,000 square kilometres (61,776 sq mi) of northern land. These permits issued mineral rights for work commitments – that is, for agreeing to spend money on exploration.

The first well in the Arctic Islands was the Winter Harbour #1 well on Melville Island, drilled in the winter of 1961–62. The operator was Dome Petroleum. Equipment and supplies for drilling and for the 35-man camp came in by ship from Montreal. This well was dry, as were two others drilled over the next two years on Cornwallis and Bathurst Islands. All three wells were technical successes.

The federal government's eagerness to encourage Arctic Islands exploration, partly to assert Canadian sovereignty, led to the formation of Panarctic Oils Ltd. in 1968. That company consolidated the interests of 75 companies and individuals with Arctic Islands land holdings plus the federal government as the major shareholder.

Panarctic began its exploration program with seismic work and then drilling in the Arctic Islands. By 1969 its Drake Point gas discovery was probably Canada's largest gas field. Over the next three years came other large gas fields in the islands, establishing reserves of 500 billion m³ (4,324 billion barrels) of sweet, dry natural gas.

There were two significant blowouts during this drilling program. Panarctic's Drake Point N-67 well, drilled in 1969 to 2577 m on the Sabine Peninsula of Melville Island, was the first major discovery in the Arctic Islands. This giant gas field has been delineated by 14 wells, (including the 1969 discovery well and two relief wells drilled to control a blowout of the discovery well). A well drilled in 1970 on King Christian Island resulted in another blowout, though of spectacular proportions. King Christian D-18 blew wild for 91 days, and, after catching fire, was the source of an 80-metre (250 ft) column of flame. It may have been emitting as much as 200 million cubic feet (5,700,000 m^{3}) of gas per day.

Panarctic also located oil on the islands at Bent Horn and Cape Allison, and offshore at Cisco and Skate. Exploration moved offshore when Panarctic began drilling wells from "ice islands" – not really islands, but platforms of thickened ice created in winter by pumping sea water on the polar ice pack.

The company found abundant gas and some oil, too. In 1985, Panarctic became a commercial oil producer on an experimental scale. This began with a single tanker load of oil from the Bent Horn oil field (discovered in 1974 at Bent Horn N-72, the first well drilled on Cameron Island). The company delivered its largest annual volume of oil – 50,000 m³ (432,424 barrels) – to southern markets in 1988. Production continued until 1996.

Panarctic's ice island wells were not the first offshore wells in the Canadian north. In 1971, Aquitaine (later known as Canterra Energy, then taken over by Husky Oil) drilled a well in Hudson Bay from a barge-mounted rig. Although south of the Arctic Circle, that well was in a hostile frontier environment. A storm forced suspension of the well, and the ultimately unsuccessful exploration program languished for several years.

=== Mackenzie delta and the Beaufort Sea ===
The Mackenzie River delta was a focus of ground and air surveys as early as 1957, and geologists drew comparisons then to the Mississippi and Niger Deltas, speculating that the Mackenzie could prove as prolific. For millions of years sediments had been pouring out of the mouth of the Mackenzie, creating tremendous banks of sand and shale – laminates of sedimentary rock warped into promising geological structures. Drilling began in the Mackenzie Delta-Tuktoyaktuk Peninsula in 1962, and accelerated during the early 1970s. The mouth of the Mackenzie River was not a Prudhoe Bay, but it did contain large gas fields.

By 1977, its established gas reserves were 200 billion m³ (1,730 barrels), and a proposal, the Mackenzie Valley Pipeline, was put forth. The ensuing Mackenzie Valley Pipeline Inquiry headed by Justice Thomas R. Berger resulted in a moratorium on such a pipeline, which today is again under consideration.

The petroleum industry gradually shifted its focus into the unpredictable waters of the Beaufort Sea. To meet the challenges of winter cold and relatively deep water, drilling technologies in the Beaufort underwent a period of rapid evolution.

The first offshore wells drilled in the Beaufort used artificial islands as drilling platforms, but this was a winter drilling system, and was only practical in shallow water. In the mid-1970s, the introduction of a fleet of reinforced drillships extended the drilling season to include the 90 to 120 ice-free days of summer. This also enabled the industry to drill in the deeper waters of the Beaufort Sea. By the mid-1980s, variations on artificial island and drilling vessel technologies had extended both the drilling season and the depth of water at which the industry could operate. They had also reduced exploration costs.

The first well to test the Beaufort was not offshore, but was drilled on Richards Island in 1966. The move offshore came in 1972–73 when Imperial Oil built two artificial islands for use in the winter drilling season. The company constructed the first of these, Immerk 13–48, from gravel dredged from the ocean floor. The island's sides were steep and eroded rapidly during the summer months. To control the erosion, the company used wire anchored across the slopes topped with World War II surplus anti-torpedo netting. The second island, Adgo F-28, used dredged silt. This proved stronger. Other artificial islands used other methods of reinforcement.

In 1976, Canadian Marine Drilling Ltd., a subsidiary of Dome Petroleum, brought a small armada to the Beaufort. It included three reinforced drillships and a support fleet of four supply boats, work and supply barges and a tugboat. This equipment expanded the explorable regions in the Beaufort Sea. Drillships, however, had their limitations for Beaufort work. Icebreakers and other forms of ice management could generally conquer the difficulties of the melting icecap in the summer. But after freeze-up began, the growing icecap would push the drill ship off location if it did not use icebreakers to keep the ice under control. CanMar's fleet eventually grew to include 5 drillships, the SSDC (Single Steel Drilling Caisson) and the Canmar Kigoriak, an Arctic Class 4 Icebreaker.

The most technologically innovative rig in the Beaufort was a vessel known as Kulluk, which originated with Gulf Oil. Kulluk was a circular vessel designed for extended-season drilling operations in Arctic waters. Kulluk could drill safely in first-year ice up to 1.2 m (3.9 ft) thick. Dome eventually acquired the vessel, which then passed progressively through acquisitions to Amoco and then BP. BP intended to sell this tool for scrap around 2000. Royal Dutch Shell subsequently purchased the vessel, however, and made plans to drill in the disputed waters of the Beaufort Sea in 2007.

The major Beaufort explorers experimented with a variety of new technologies and produced some of the most costly and specialized drilling systems in the world. Some of these were extensions of artificial island technologies; design engineers concentrated on ways to protect the island from erosion and impact. In shallow water, the standard became the sacrificial beach island. This island had long, gradually sloping sides against which the vengeance of weather and sea could spend themselves.

Beaufort Sea exploration activity followed oil prices: it was kick-started by the Arab Oil Embargo in 1973 and withered as prices fell in the early 1980s. Canada's National Energy Program, which was announced just as prices peaked in 1980, imposed price controls on Canadian oil and further suppressed investment.

In December 2005 Devon Energy started drilling the first offshore well in Canadian waters of the Beaufort sea since 1989, from the drilling rig SDC. The SDC (or Steel Drilling Caisson) was built for Canmar in 1982 by attaching the forebody of the Very Large Crude Carrier World Saga to the top of a steel barge with sloping sides (mimicking an artificial island); the barge can be ballasted to sit on the bottom for drilling operations. The Paktoa C-60 well was completed in 2006, but results are unknown as it was designated a "tight hole" – a well for which, for competitive reasons, no information could be released.

== Coastal energy ==
=== Scotian Shelf ===
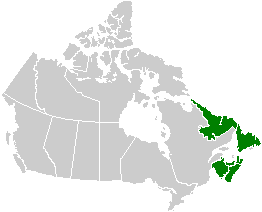
Canada's east coast offshore regions comprise the continental shelves of the four Atlantic provinces.

The site of Canada's first salt water offshore well was 13 km (8.1 mi) off the shores of Prince Edward Island. Spudded in 1943, the Hillsborough #1 well was drilled by the Island Development Company. The company used a drilling island constructed in 8 m (26 ft) of water of wood and some 7,200 tonnes (7,086 L/T or 7,937 S/T) of rock and concrete. The well reached 4,479 m (14,695 ft) at a cost of $1.25 million – an extremely expensive well in that era. Part of the Allied war effort, Hillsborough was declared dry and abandoned in September 1945.

In 1967 Mobil drilled the first well off Nova Scotia, the Sable Offshore Energy Project C-67 well. Located on desolate, sandy Sable Island (best known for its herd of wild horses), the well bottomed in gas-bearing Cretaceous rocks. Drilling stopped there because the technology did not exist to handle the super-pressures the well encountered.

Shell's experience at this well foreshadowed two future developments on the Scotian Shelf. First, major discoveries offshore Nova Scotia would generally be natural gas reservoirs and second, they would involve high pressures. In the early 1980s, two discovery wells – Shell's Uniacke G-72 and Mobil's West Venture N-91 – actually blew wild. The Uniacke well, which was being drilled from the semi-submersible rig Vinland, took about ten days to bring under control. By contrast, the blowout at West Venture took eight months to shut in.

West Venture started as a surface blowout, and was swiftly shut in by the crew of the rig, Zapata Scotian, but the well then blew out underground. High-pressure natural gas burst through the well's casing, and began rushing from a deep zone into a shallow one. In oil industry parlance, the blowout "charged" (i.e., fed into) the shallower geological zone, dramatically increasing reservoir pressure. The direct cost of bringing this one well under control was $200 million.

The industry made other modest oil and gas discoveries in its early years off Nova Scotia – for example, Shell's Onondaga E-84 gas well, drilled to a depth of 3,988 m (13,084 ft) in 1969. And in 1973, Mobil spudded the D-42 Cohasset well on the western rim of the Sable sub-basin.

Mobil's bit found almost 50 m (160 ft) of net oil pay in eleven zones of Cretaceous lower Logan Canyon sands. However, a follow-up well five years later found only water-bearing sands, and the company suspended work on the field. Mobil moved to other Scotian Shelf locations, discovering the promising Venture gas field in 1979.

Located on a seismic prospect which had been recognized some years earlier, Mobil had waited to drill the Venture probe because the structure was deep and could contain high-pressure zones like those which had halted drilling at Sable Island in the previous decade. The Venture discovery well cost $40 million, then a startling price for a single well.

Ironically, the first commercial offshore discovery, Mobil's 1973 Cohasset discovery, appeared relatively inconsequential when found. But toward the end of the 1980s, a combination of exploration successes and innovative thinking led to development of a field which most of the industry had seen as uneconomic. In December 1985, Petro-Canada spudded the Cohasset A-52 step-out well to explore the Cohasset structure southwest of Mobil's 1973 discovery well. Unlike a disappointing 1978 step-out, that hole tested oil at a combined rate of 4,500 m³ (38,918 barrels) per day from six zones.

Following up on the positive results of the A-52 well, Shell drilled a discovery well at Panuke, 8 km (5.0 mi) southwest of Cohasset. The Shell Panuke B-90 wildcat encountered a relatively thin zone that tested light oil at a rate of 1,000 m³ (8,648 barrels) per day. The following year, Petro-Canada drilled the F-99 delineation well at Panuke. That well tested oil at 8,000 m³ (69,188 barrels) a day for six days.

While the Cohasset and Panuke discoveries were marginal by themselves, in the mid-1980s a consulting firm hired by Crown corporation Nova Scotia Resources Limited (NSRL) investigated the idea of joining them together. By forming a joint venture with British-based Lasmo plc, which formed a Nova-Scotian affiliate to operate the field, NSRL was able to make the project a financial and technical success. In the end, however, production was less than expected; the field only produced from 1992 to 1999.

In January 2000 offshore development reached a milestone when gas from Nova Scotia's Sable Offshore Energy Project gas plant was first delivered to Maritimes and New England markets. The project now produces between 400 and 500 million cubic feet (11,000,000 and 14,000,000 m^{3}) of natural gas and 20,000 barrels (3,200 m^{3}) of natural gas liquids every day. However, EnCana Corporation is now developing a gas find known as Deep Panuke, which could replace some of the depleting gas fields from Nova Scotia's existing offshore gas fields.

=== Newfoundland and Labrador ===
The Labrador Shelf of Newfoundland and Labrador was a prospective exploration province in the early period of eastern offshore exploration. First drilled in 1971, wells in the deeper waters were drilled from dynamically positioned drillships.

Icebergs calved from the glaciers of Greenland earned this stretch of water the unaffectionate nickname "Iceberg Alley." Icebergs drifting toward drilling equipment posed a unique hazard for the industry in that forbidding environment. But using a blend of cowboy and maritime technology, Labrador drillers handled the problem by lassoing the bergs with polypropylene ropes and steel hawsers, then towing them out of the way.

Worsening exploration economics and poor drilling results dampened the industry's enthusiasm for the area. Drilling stopped in the early 1980s, although it continued in the more southerly waters off Newfoundland.

The most promising drilling off Canada's east coast took place on the Grand Banks of Newfoundland – particularly the Avalon and Jeanne d'Arc basins. Exploration began in the area in 1966 and, save one oil show in 1973, the first 40 wells on the Grand Banks were dry.

Then, in 1976, came the Hibernia oil strike, which changed the fortunes of the area. It soon became clear that offshore Newfoundland could and did host large oil fields.

Although non-commercial, the next nine wildcats provided valuable geological information. More importantly, two discoveries from the mid-1980s – Terra Nova and White Rose – looked to be more easily producible than Hibernia. They did not go into production until 2002 and 2005, however.

Terra Nova and White Rose each use a floating production storage and off-loading vessel (FPSO) to gather and store produced oil. Production facilities were constructed in excavations on the ocean floor. The vessels can be moved to harbour if conditions warrant, and being recessed protects sub-sea facilities from iceberg scouring.

Although not appropriate for many offshore reservoirs, this approach is both economical and safe. Industry insiders sometimes call them "cut and run" systems.

The production system eventually developed for Hibernia is quite another matter. Insiders sometimes describe it as a "stand and fight" system – a fixed platform heavily fortified to withstand iceberg impact. It is strong on safety, but it was not cheap.

=== Hibernia ===
Chevron drilled the Hibernia discovery well to earn a commercial interest in Grand Banks acreage held by Mobil and Gulf. The field is 315 km (196 mi) east-southeast of St. John's, and water depth is about 80 m (260 ft). Between 1980 and 1984, Mobil drilled nine delineation wells in the field at a cost of $465 million. Eight of those wells were successful. They established the field's recoverable oil reserves at around 625 million barrels (99,400,000 m^{3}) – about 40 per cent more oil than originally estimated.

Bringing the field on production was a long time coming. It involved settling a jurisdictional dispute between Newfoundland and Canada over ownership of offshore minerals and other issues. Lengthy fiscal negotiations began in 1985, shortly after Mobil submitted a development plan to the two governments. Not until 1988 did the two governments reach agreement on the development with Mobil, Petro-Canada, Chevron Corporation and Gulf Oil – the companies with interests in the field.

By the terms of this agreement, the federal government would provide $1 billion in grants, $1.66 billion in loan guarantees, and other assistance to the $5.8 billion development. These concessions were necessary because of government insistence on a huge, expensive concrete production platform (the Gravity Base System or GBS) despite an environment of lower and declining oil prices. Potentially, these factors would make the field uneconomic.

The world's largest oil platform, Hibernia's GBS sits on the ocean floor approximately 80 m (260 ft) in depth with its topsides extending approximately 50 m (160 ft) out of the water. The platform acts as a small concrete island with serrated outer edges designed to counter icebergs. The GBS contains storage tanks for 1.3 million barrels (210,000 m^{3}) of oil, and the remainder of the void space is filled with magnetite ballast. The structure weighs 1.2 million tons (1.1 million tonnes).

A floating platform like those used in the North Sea would have been far less expensive. However, GBS had safety advantages for a field located in an extremely inhospitable environment where rogue waves, fog, icebergs and sea ice, hurricanes, and nor'easter winter storms were not uncommon. Because of an industrial disaster at Hibernia at the beginning of the decade, this was a critical argument.

Since the oil industry's earliest days, discovery and production have periodically taken a human toll. For Canada's petroleum industry, the worst incident was the Ocean Ranger disaster of 1982. In that terrible tragedy the Ocean Ranger, a semi-submersible offshore rig drilling the Hibernia J-34 delineation well, went down in a winter storm. The vessel took 84 hands into the frigid sea; none survived. This memory was fresh in everyone's mind when the field's production system was being negotiated.

For the governments involved, the high cost of the project actually had appeal as a way to help counter Newfoundland's chronically high unemployment. Whether profitable to its owners or not, this vast project would stimulate the economy of Canada's poorest province. According to Newfoundland historian Valerie Summers, "for cynics in Newfoundland and elsewhere in Canada, Hibernia was generally viewed as one of the costliest regional developments in Canadian history and one of the biggest gambles in Newfoundland history." Now thought to have begun its productive phase as a billion-barrel reservoir, Hibernia went on stream in 1997.

Ten years later, the province negotiated a deal to develop a fourth project at the Hebron discovery. The industry partners in this development are ExxonMobil Canada, Chevron Canada, Petro-Canada and Norsk Hydro Canada. ExxonMobil will be the operator. The Province of Newfoundland and Labrador will take a 4.9 per cent equity stake in the project through its Energy Corporation. The province also negotiated an additional 6.5 per cent royalty paid on net revenues whenever monthly average oil prices exceed US$50 per barrel after net royalty payout.

The development costs for the project are estimated to be between $7 billion – $11 billion over the 20-25 year lifespan of the field. The owners expect the project to be able to produce 150,000 to 170,000 barrels (27,000 m^{3}) of oil per day.

=== West coast ===
A sedimentary basin also exists off the British Columbia Coast, and some exploratory drilling has taken place there. From 1967 to 1969, Shell drilled 14 deep dry holes from the Transocean 135-F semi-submersible – some west of Vancouver, others in Hecate Strait beside the Queen Charlotte Islands. Exploration off the west coast stopped in 1972 when the federal and British Columbia governments imposed moratoria on exploration, pending the results of studies into the environmental impact of drilling. In 1986 a government-appointed commission recommended an end to the moratorium.

The province had still not acted by 1989, however, when an American barge spilled oil off the British Columbia coast. A few months later came the disastrous Exxon Valdez oil spill off Alaska. Although neither of these spills was related to crude oil exploration or production, they made it politically impossible for governments to lift the moratorium.

In 2001, the provincial government initiated another review of its drilling ban, and recommended lifting the moratorium. A federal panel then convened, held a hearing and issued a report in 2004 that did not make any recommendations and the federal ban remained in place.

In 2007, the BC government announced an energy policy that formally called for lifting the moratorium. Without federal agreement, however, no drilling can begin.

== Matters of policy ==
As industry explored the frontiers, Canada drilled some of the world's deepest offshore wells – notably the Annapolis G-24 gas well, drilled to a depth of 6,100 m (20,000 ft) (water depth was 1,675 m (5,495 ft)) offshore Nova Scotia in 2002. The industry built new artificial island and mobile drilling systems. It created networks capable of providing instant communication between head office and remote well sites. And it developed the world's most sophisticated understanding of ice and ways to deal with it in the north. These and other initiatives gave the Canadian petroleum industry unrivalled expertise in some areas.

=== Petroleum Incentive Payments ===
Because petroleum is a strategic commodity mostly found on Crown land and an important source of government revenue, Canadian governments have long been involved in developing energy policy and passing it into law. This was particularly evident for frontier exploration in 1980, when Canada's federal government imposed the National Energy Program (NEP) upon companies exploring federal lands. The policy was far-reaching, and it included a complex mix of taxes, royalties, reversion to the Crown of frontier properties, and incentive payments. This policy was a direct response to several years of rising oil prices punctuated by the 1979 energy crisis, which briefly took crude oil prices to $39.50.

By December 1985, OPEC oil output had reached 18 million barrels (2,900,000 m^{3}) per day. This worsened an existing glut of oil and triggered a price war. In the following year, average world oil prices fell by more than 50 per cent. This price shock took many oil companies and oil-producing states and regions into a long period of crisis.

The industry's frontier operations were particularly vulnerable to the oil price collapse. Canada had already dismantled the NEP, and costly frontier drilling, which had found reserves that were mostly uneconomic in the lower-price environment, was the first casualty of an industry-wide crisis. A precipitous decline in frontier activity was well underway by mid-year 1986, and drilling was almost at a standstill by year-end.

This sequence of events gives an interesting illustration of the potential for economic distortions from government incentives. In five-year increments from 1966, average exploration costs for frontier wells changed as follows:

| **Period** | **Canadian Arctic** | **East coast offshore** |
| 1966–1970 | $4.3 million | $1.2 million |
| 1971–1975 | $3.6 million | $3.8 million |
| 1976–1980 | $24.4 million | $22.4 million |
| 1981–1985 | **$63.2 million** | **$45.8 million** |
| 1986–1989 | $44.2 million | $20.5 million |

The stand-out numbers are marked in bold. Clearly, drilling during the first half of the 1980s was for incentive payments as much as for oil. Major beneficiaries of the Petroleum Incentives Payments among Canadian oil-producing companies included Dome, Imperial Oil and Gulf Canada. All three operated drilling subsidiaries in the North.

After the oil price crash, cash flow for many companies was in negative territory. Exploration activity declined dramatically, but did not come to a complete halt. There was intense competition among drilling companies for the work available, and the cost inflation induced by the federal government's Petroleum Incentives Payments declined swiftly.

=== Atlantic Accord ===
An important policy question of who owns Newfoundland's offshore minerals briefly stood in the way of offshore oil and gas development. With the discovery of Hibernia came the prospect of petroleum riches from under the sea. In response, the government of Newfoundland and Labrador laid claim to mineral rights in its offshore regions. The province had been a dominion until 1949. It now said it had not ceded its offshore resources to Ottawa when it became a Canadian province in 1949.

In terms of petroleum politics, the decade beginning in 1973 was a fractious period in Canada, and Newfoundland's claim led to a stand-off with the Liberal government of Pierre Trudeau, which took the case to the Supreme Court of Canada. The court ruled against Newfoundland in 1984.

In the end, however, the issue was resolved politically. In 1985, the newly elected Progressive Conservative (PC) government of Brian Mulroney and Newfoundland's PC government (headed by Brian Peckford) negotiated a deal known as the Atlantic Accord. As opposition leader, Mulroney had offered this deal to Peckford in the lead-up to the federal election of 1984. As a result, Peckford campaigned vigorously for the Progressive Conservatives. In the election, Newfoundland returned four Progressive Conservative MPs to the House of Commons.

The accord put aside the question of ownership of those resources, even though that issue had already been decided by the court. Instead, the agreement acted as though the two levels of government had equal mineral rights in the offshore. The governments passed mutual and parallel legislation to get the deal done.

In the formal signing, Ottawa and St. John's described the purposes of the Accord in these terms:

# To provide for the development of oil and gas resources offshore Newfoundland for the benefit of Canada as a whole and Newfoundland and Labrador in particular;

1. To protect, preserve, and advance the attainment of national self-sufficiency and security of supply;
2. To recognize the right of Newfoundland and Labrador to be the principal beneficiary of the oil and gas resources off its shores, consistent with the requirement for a strong and united Canada;
3. To recognize the equality of both governments in the management of the resource, and ensure that the pace and manner of development optimize the social and economic benefits to Canada as a whole and to Newfoundland and Labrador in particular;
4. To provide that the Government of Newfoundland and Labrador can establish and collect resource revenues as if these resources were on land, within the province;
5. To provide for a stable and fair offshore management regime for industry;
6. To provide for a stable and permanent arrangement for the management of the offshore adjacent to Newfoundland by enacting the relevant provisions of this Accord in legislation of the Parliament of Canada and the Legislature of Newfoundland and Labrador and by providing that the Accord may only be amended by the mutual consent of both governments; and
7. To promote within the system of joint management, insofar as is appropriate, consistency with the management regimes established for other offshore areas in Canada.

With the accord signed and the necessary legislation being prepared, the companies involved in Hibernia could complete their development plan and negotiate project approval with the Canada-Newfoundland Offshore Petroleum Board, a regulatory body representing both levels of government. Elsewhere, this history describes some of the terms they reached for the Hibernia project.

In 1986, Mulroney and premier John Buchanan (a Nova Scotia PC) signed the Canada-Nova Scotia Offshore Petroleum Resources Accord. This agreement was similar to the Atlantic Accord in intent, tone and implementation.

Key to these negotiations were two important federal concessions: Ottawa would not include St. John's or Halifax's petroleum revenues in its calculations for equalization payments to those provinces, and initially all revenues from offshore oil and gas would accrue to the provinces. These deals thus allowed the provinces to tax offshore petroleum resources as if they were the owners.

When amending the agreements in 2005, the short-lived Liberal government of Paul Martin provided these two Atlantic provinces with transitional protection from reductions in equalization that would have otherwise resulted from their growing offshore revenues. In Newfoundland's case, the province offered an up-front payment of $2 billion as a "prepayment" toward this protection guarantee. Those accords extend to 2011–12, with the option of an extension to 2019–2020 if the provinces remain disadvantaged relative to other provinces.

In an effort to create a single regime for both provinces, the incoming government of Conservative Prime Minister Stephen Harper proposed an alternative approach. The two provinces could stick with the deals they had already signed, or they could accept a more generous formula that included 50 per cent of resource revenue in the equalization formula. Nova Scotia signed on October 10, 2007.

In an environment of higher energy prices, these two traditionally poor provinces could see futures in which they would be less dependent on federal transfers of funds. This was a clear indication of the value to their economies of greater petroleum development in an energy-dependent world.

== Metric conversions ==
One cubic metre of oil = 6.29 barrels. One cubic metre of natural gas = 35.49 cubic feet (1.005 m^{3}). One kilopascal = 1% of atmospheric pressure (near sea level).

Canada's oil measure, the cubic metre, is unique in the world. It is metric in the sense that it uses metres, but it is based on volume so that Canadian units can be easily converted into barrels. In the rest of the metric world, the standard for measuring oil is the tonne. The advantage of the latter measure is that it reflects oil quality. In general, lower grade oils are heavier.

== See also ==
- Energy policy of Canada
- Natural gas processing
- Canol Heritage Trail
