= Stork B.V. =

Dutch manufacturing and energy services company

Stork
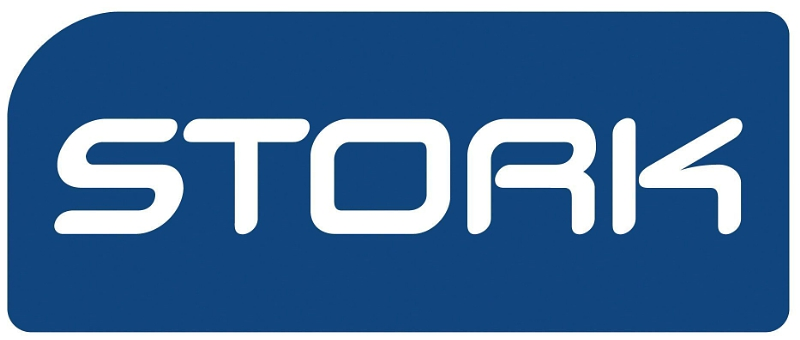
- Industry: Oil, Gas, Energy Services
- Founded: 1865
- Founder: Charles Theodorus Stork
- Headquarters: Utrecht
- Parent: Bilfinger SE

Stork B.V. is a Dutch manufacturing and services company with headquarters in Utrecht.

Stork Technical Services is a supplier of integrated technical services for installations and machines in the industrial market.

== History ==
In 1865, Stork was founded by Charles Theodorus Stork, in Borne, where it produced machinery for the emerging textile industry in the region. In 1868 Stork moved to Hengelo, and diversified its production, including steam engines for factories, ships and pumping stations, as well as machinery for the sugar industry. The factory grew steadily, and also started to build housing accommodation for its employees, Tuindorp 't Lansink (1910s), besides investing in public buildings and cultural organizations in Hengelo, such as a theatre and a library. In 1954 Stork merged with Werkspoor, founded in 1827. In 1996 Stork acquired the healthy parts of Fokker, creating a new division.

By 2007 Stork had four divisions:

- Textile print machines (Stork Prints) sold in 2007
- Poultry slaughter machines (Stork Food Systems)
- Aerospace and space technology (Fokker Aerospace Group)
- Technical services (Stork Industry Services)

The company agreed to a €1.5 billion takeover by a consortium led by the British buyout firm Candover on 28 November 2007. As part of the deal, Stork's food systems unit was sold on in May 2008 to Marel Food Systems, an Icelandic firm controlled by Landsbanki Íslands and Eyrir Invest. The consortium delisted Stork from the Amsterdam Stock Exchange on 19 February 2008, having obtained around 98% of the company's shares by mid-January.

On 24 November 2010, Stork BV announced the sale of their Materials and Testing group to 3i Group plc.

In 2012 the last remaining divisions Fokker Technologies and Stork Technical Services became independent of each other. In 2015 Fokker Technologies was spun off into GKN Aerospace.

In 2016 Stork BV was acquired by US company Fluor Corporation. After the deal, Fluor joined its own Operations & Maintenance division of 4000 employees with Stork.

In September 2023 Fluor Corporation announced that it has agreed to sell its Stork B.V. business in Belgium, Germany, the Netherlands, as well as its turbo blading manufacturing operations in the United States to industrial services provider Bilfinger SE.
