= Kulluk =

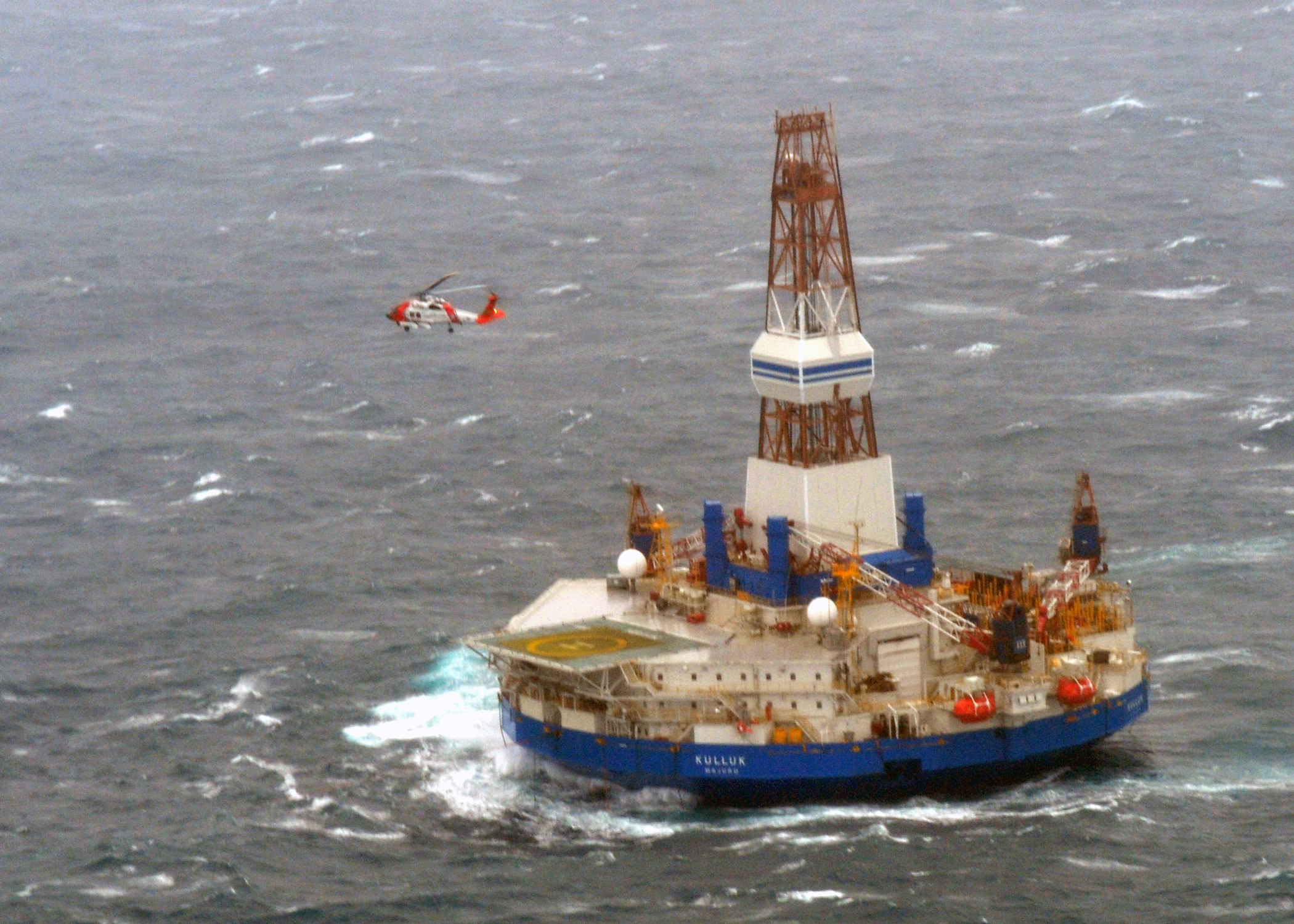
- A helicopter delivers personnel to Kulluk on 31 December 2012

History
- Name: Kulluk
- Namesake: Inuvialuktun for Thunder
- Owner: Gulf Canada (1983–1993); Amoco Production (1993); SeaTankers (1993–2005); Royal Dutch Shell (2005–2014)
- Operator: Frontier Drilling (2006–2011); Noble Corporation (2011–2012)
- Port of registry: Canada, Vancouver (1983–??); Liberia, Monrovia (??–2005); Marshall Islands, Majuro (2005–2014)
- Builder: Mitsui Engineering & Shipbuilding, Tamano, Japan
- Cost: Over US$200 million
- Completed: 1983; 43 years ago
- Identification: Call sign: V7JH8; DNV number: 27051; IMO number: 8752219; MMSI number: 8752219
- Fate: Broken up in 2014

General characteristics
- Type: Drill barge
- Tonnage: 27,968 GT; 8,391 NT; 9,902 DWT
- Displacement: 17,500 tonnes (lightship); 28,000 tonnes (full)
- Diameter: 81 m (266 ft) (main deck)
- Draught: 8 m (26 ft) (lightship); 10–12.5 m (33–41 ft) (operating)
- Depth: 18.5 m (61 ft)
- Ice class: Arctic Class 4
- Installed power: Four diesel engines
- Propulsion: None
- Crew: Accommodation for 108

Kulluk was an ice-strengthened drill barge that was used for oil exploration in the Arctic waters. She was constructed by Mitsui Engineering & Shipbuilding in Japan in 1983 and operated in the Canadian Arctic until 1993 when she was mothballed for over a decade. In 2005, she was purchased and extensively refurbished by Shell PLC for drilling off the Alaska North Slope.

On 31 December 2012, Kulluk drifted aground after the towing line to the icebreaking anchor handling tug supply vessel Aiviq parted in heavy weather. While the rig was recovered, it was irreparable and was scrapped in March 2014.

== Career ==
From 1983 to 1993, the rig was operated by Gulf Canada Resources in Northern Canada. She was mothballed in 1993, and in 2005 she was acquired by Shell Plc and underwent intensive refurbishment.

In January 2006, Shell awarded a contract to manage and operate Kulluk to Frontier Drilling (now part of Noble Corporation).

=== 2012 grounding ===
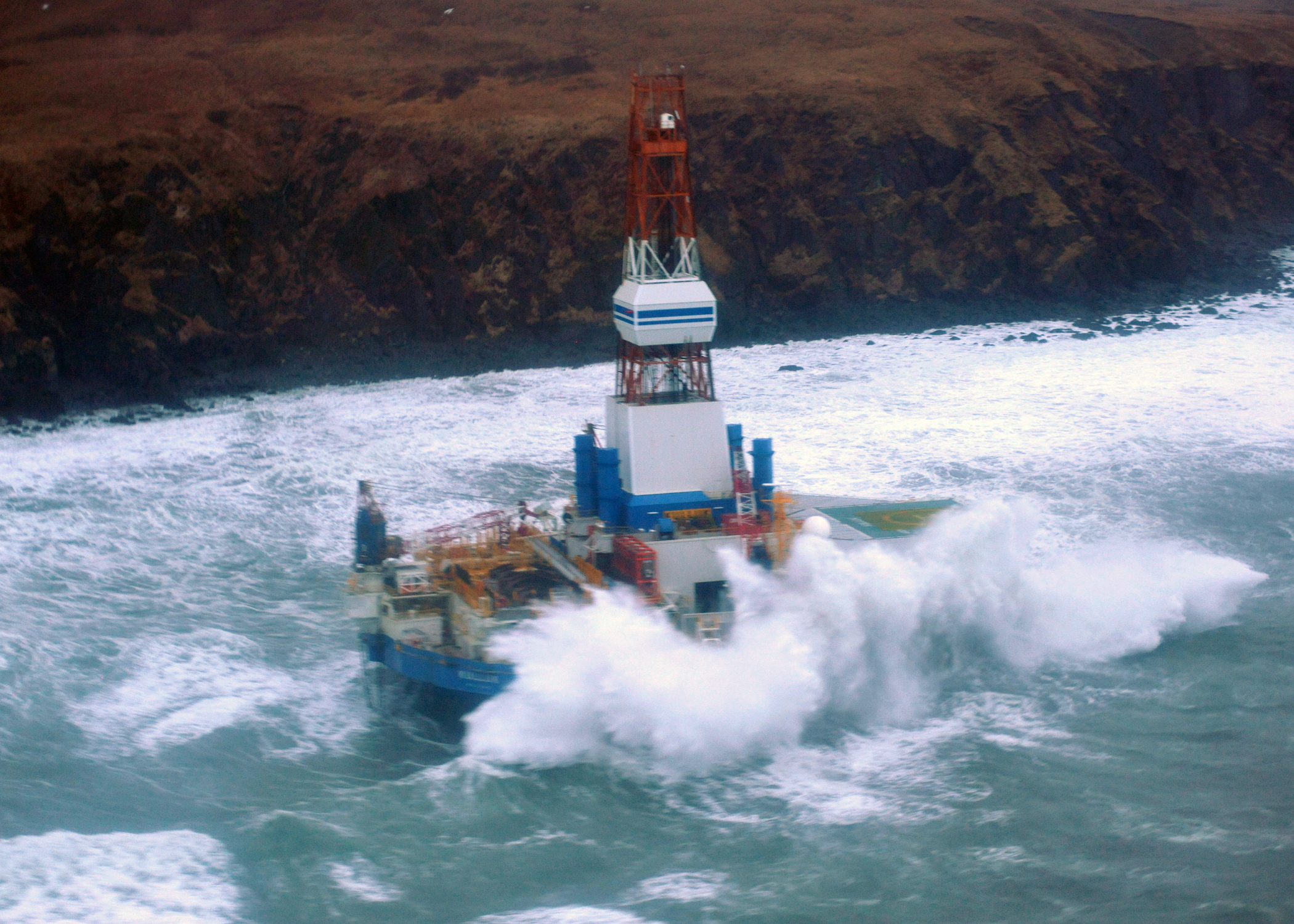
Kulluk aground on the southeast side of Sitkalidak Island on 1 January 2013

On 31 December 2012, Kulluk drifted aground off Sitkalidak Island in the Gulf of Alaska. Up until October the rig had been working in the Beaufort Sea, off the Alaska North Slope. She was being towed to her winter home in Seattle when she encountered a storm, and the incident occurred. The United States Coast Guard evacuated her 18-man crew on 29 December. On New Year's Eve, tug crews were ordered by the United States Coast Guard to cut the rig loose, leading to her grounding.

Kulluk's movement south for the winter was at least in part motivated by an effort to avoid State of Alaska property taxes on oil and gas extraction equipment. The tax in question is a state property tax of 20 mills (or 2%) "on property used or committed by contract or other agreement for use for the pipeline transportation of gas or unrefined oil or for the production of gas or unrefined oil at its full and true value as of January 1 of the assessment year." The tax liability for the rig was estimated at $6–7 million, based on the value of the rig.

Kulluk was carrying 138,000 US gallons (520,000 L; 115,000 imp gal) of ultra-low-sulfur diesel fuel, 1,000 US gallons (3,800 L; 830 imp gal) of aviation fuel and 12,000 US gallons (45,000 L; 10,000 imp gal) of lubricants.

On January 6, 2013, Kulluk was floated from the rocks. Satisfied the vessel was seaworthy, she was towed to shelter in nearby Kodiak Island's Kiliuda Bay. After further assessment of damage, Kulluk was towed to Captains Bay, Unalaska, Alaska, where she was loaded on the heavy lift ship Xiang Rui Kou. She departed for Singapore for repair and updates in late March 2013.

In October 2013, Shell said that the Kulluk would be scrapped.

Until February 2014, she remained at Keppel FELS Pioneer Yard shipyard in Singapore.

In March 2014, Xiang Rui Kou towed Kulluk to a Chinese scrap yard.

In April 2014, the United States Coast Guard report said that the incident was due to Shell's "inadequate assessment and management of risks" in icy, storm-tossed waters.

In December 2014, Noble Corporation agreed to pay $12.2 million in fines for knowingly making false entries and failing to record its collection, transfer, storage, and disposal of oil in the Noble Discoverer's and the Kulluk's oil record books in 2012.

In May 2015, a report by the National Transportation Safety Board blamed "Shell’s inadequate assessment of the risk for its planned tow" for the accident.

== Design ==
Kulluk was strengthened against ice with 3 in (76 mm) thick, reinforced steel, and a funnel-shaped double hull with flared sides enabling her to operate in Arctic waters as moving ice was deflected downwards and was broken into pieces. The vessel was moored with a twelve-point anchor system. Her rated water depth for operations was 400 feet (120 m). Her drilling depth was 20,000 feet (6,100 m).

Originally, Kulluk had no propulsion and had to be towed to location. In 2006, Shell contracted Aker Arctic to evaluate the feasibility of adding a thruster-aided propulsion to the drilling barge. In 2007, Kulluk was fitted with two 62-tonne, 2,000 shaft horsepower (1,500 kW) ThrustMaster hydraulic overboard azimuth thrusters, the largest ever supplied by the company, to provide the platform an ability to move between drill sites and improve her operability in ice. However, before the system was completely installed, the project was delayed and subsequently halted due to regulatory and operational changes. In 2011, the thrusters were removed and sold while Kulluk was on the shipyard, turning Kulluk into an unpropelled drilling barge again.
