= List of icebreakers =

This is a list of icebreakers and other special icebreaking vessels (except cargo ships and tankers) capable of operating independently in ice-covered waters. Ships known to be in service are presented in bold.

== Argentina ==
- ARA General San Martín (1954–1982; broken up)
- **ARA Almirante Irízar** (1978–2007, 2017–)
- ARA Bahía Paraíso (1980–1989; sank in Antarctica)

== Australia ==
- Aurora Australis (1990–2020; sold to a private company and renamed Aurora Dubai)
- **Nuyina** (2021–)

== Austria ==
- **Eisvogel** (1955–)
- **Röthelstein** (1995–)

== Azerbaijan ==
- Kapitan A. Radzhabov (1992–1999; laid up)

== Canada ==
=== Canadian Coast Guard ===
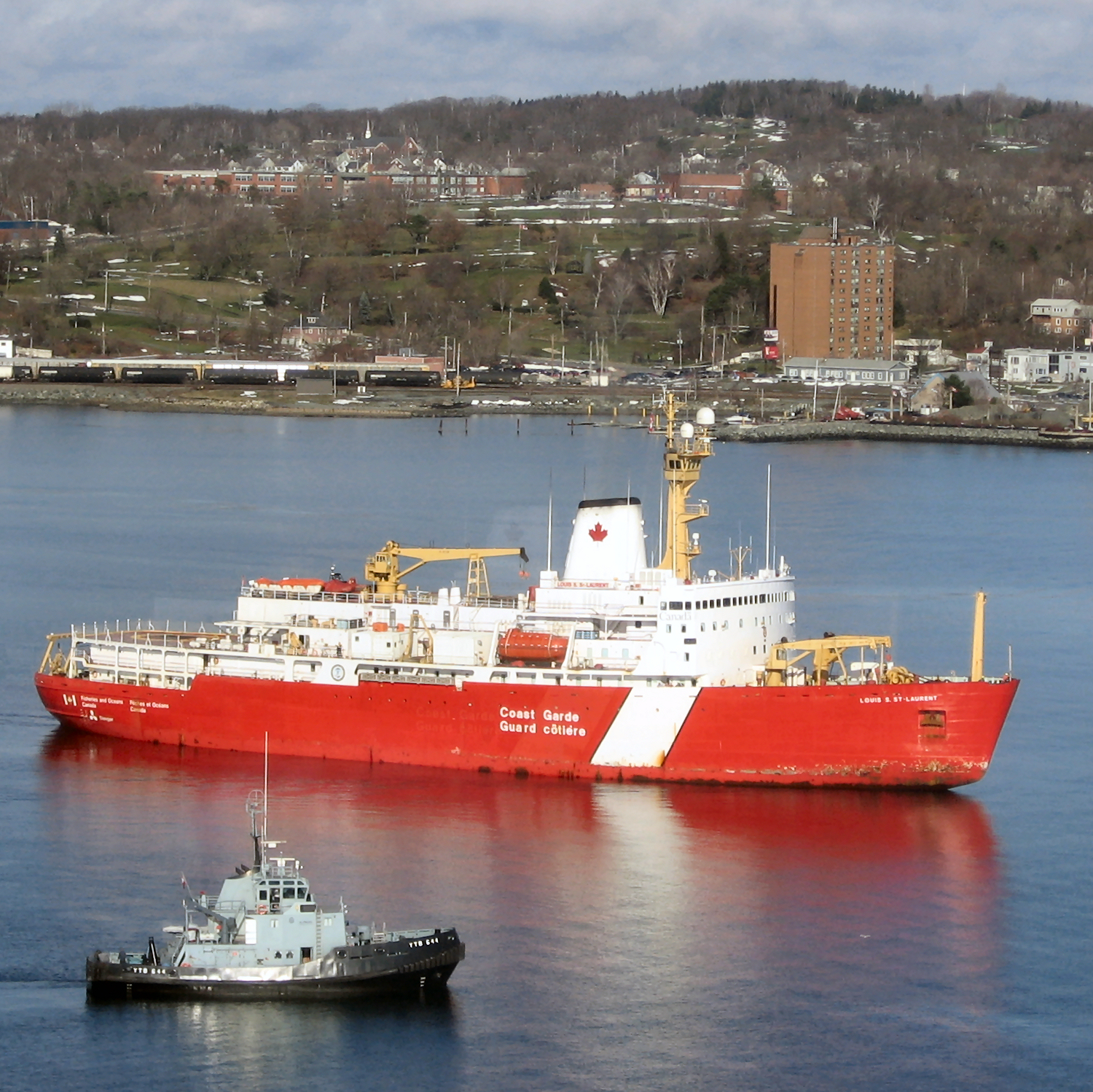
CCGS Louis S. St-Laurent in Halifax Harbour

- CGS Northern Light (1876–1890; sold)
- CGS Stanley (1888–1935; broken up)
- CGS Minto (1899–1915; sold to Russia)
- CGS Montcalm (1904–1942; sold to Russia)
- CGS Earl Grey (1909–1914; sold to Russia)
- CGS Mikula (1916; 1923–1937; ex-J.D. Hazen, ex-Mikula Seleaninovich; broken up)
- CCGS Saurel (1929–1967; broken up)
- CCGS N.B. McLean (1930–1979; broken up)
- CCGS Ernest Lapointe (1939–1978; museum ship)
- CCGS Edward Cornwallis (1949–1986; sold to a private company and broken up in 1993)
- CCGS C.D. Howe (1950–1969; sold to a private company and broken up in 1975)
- CCGS D'Iberville (1952–1983; broken up)
- CCGS Labrador (1954–1987; broken up)
- CCGS Montcalm (1957–1988; broken up)
- CCGS Sir William Alexander (1959–1989; CCGS William since 1987; sold to a private company and later wrecked in Jamaica)
- CCGS Sir Humphrey Gilbert (1959–2001; new bow in 1984; sold to a private company)
- CCGS Alexander Henry (1959–1984; museum ship)
- CCGS Camsell (1959–1988; broken up)
- CCGS Wolfe (1959–1988; broken up)
- CCGS Tupper (1959–1997; sold to a private company)
- CCGS John A. Macdonald (1960–1991; broken up)
- CCGS John Cabot (1965–1994; sold to a private company and broken up in 2014)
- CCGS Norman McLeod Rogers (1969–1993; sold to Chile)
- **CCGS Louis S. St-Laurent** (1969–)
- **CCGS Griffon** (1970–)
- Pierre Radisson class
  - **CCGS Pierre Radisson** (1977–)
  - **CCGS Amundsen** (1979–)
  - **CCGS Des Groseilliers** (1982–)
  - **CCGS Henry Larsen** (1987–)
- Samuel Risley class
  - **CCGS Samuel Risley** (1985–)
  - **CCGS Earl Grey** (1986–)
- Martha L. Black class
  - **CCGS Martha L. Black** (1986–)
  - **CCGS George R. Pearkes** (1986–)
  - **CCGS Sir Wilfrid Laurier** (1986–)
  - **CCGS Kopit Hopson 1752** (1986–; ex-Edward Cornwallis)
  - **CCGS Sir William Alexander** (1987–)
  - **CCGS Ann Harvey** (1987–)
- **CCGS Terry Fox** (1991–; first leased and then acquired from a commercial operator)
- Interim icebreakers
  - **CCGS Captain Molly Kool** (2019–; ex-Vidar Viking)
  - **CCGS Jean Goodwill** (2022–; ex-Balder Viking)
  - **CCGS Vincent Massey** (2023–; ex-Tor Viking)
  - **CCGS Judy LaMarsh** (2023–; ex-Mangystau-2)
- New icebreakers and icebreaking vessels planned as part of the National Shipbuilding Strategy
  - sixteen multi-purpose icebreakers
  - six medium-sized "program icebreakers"
  - two polar icebreakers
    - CCGS Arpatuuq (2030– (planned); under construction)
    - CCGS Imnaryuaq (2032– (planned); under construction)
  - two modified Harry DeWolf-class offshore patrol vessels
    - CCGS Donjek (2026– (planned); under construction)
    - CCGS Sermilik (2027– (planned); under construction)

=== Royal Canadian Navy ===
- HMCS Labrador (1954–1961; transferred to Coast Guard)
- Harry DeWolf-class offshore patrol vessel
  - **HMCS Harry DeWolf** (2021–)
  - **HMCS Margaret Brooke** (2022–)
  - **HMCS Max Bernays** (2024–)
  - **HMCS William Hall** (2024–)
  - **HMCS Frédérick Rolette** (2025–)
  - HMCS Robert Hampton Gray (2026– (planned); delivered)

=== Commercial ===
- Canmar Kigoriak (1979–2003; sold to Russia)
- Robert LeMeur (1982–1997; sold to China)
- Terry Fox (1983–1991; leased and later sold to the Canadian Coast Guard)
- Arctic Kalvik (1983–2003; sold to Russia)
- Ikaluk (1983–1998; Canmar Ikaluk since 1995; sold to Russia)
- Miscaroo (1983–1998; Canmar Miscaroo since 1995; sold to Russia)
- Arctic Ivik (1985–1997; sold and later converted to survey vessel Geco Snapper)
- Polar S (2000–2022; ex-Njord, ex-Polar Star; broken up)
- **Polar Prince** (2000–; ex-CCGS Sir Humphrey Gilbert)
- Arcticaborg (2018–2019; transferred to Russia)

== China ==
=== State Oceanic Administration ===
==== Polar Research Institute of China ====
- **Xuě Lóng** (雪龙; "Snow Dragon") (1993–)
- **Xuě Lóng 2** (雪龙2; "Snow Dragon 2") (2019–)

==== North Sea Branch ====
- **Ji Di** (极地; "Polar") (2024–)

=== People's Liberation Army Navy ===
- Type 071 icebreaker
  - Haibing 722 (海冰722; "Sea Ice 722") (1971–2013; ex-C722, ex-Haibing 101; in reserve)
  - Haibing 721 (海冰721; "Sea Ice 721") (1973–2013; ex-C721, ex-Haibing 102; transferred to the China Coast Guard)
- Type 210 icebreaker
  - Haibing 723 (海冰723; "Sea Ice 723") (1982–2012; ex-C723; transferred to the China Marine Surveillance)
- Type 272 icebreaker
  - **Haibing 722** (海冰722; "Sea Ice 722") (2016–)
  - **Haibing 723** (海冰723; "Sea Ice 723") (2016–)

=== China Marine Surveillance ===
- Haijian 111 (海监111; "Marine Surveillance 111") (2012–2013; transferred to the China Coast Guard)

=== China Coast Guard ===
- Changxing (长兴) (2012–2026; ex-Haijing 6401, ex-Haijing 1411, ex-Haijian 111, ex-Haibing 723; decommissioned)
- **Donghai 519** (东海519; "East China Sea 519") (2013–; ex-Haibing 721, ex-C721, ex-Haibing 102)

=== Sun Yat-sen University ===
- **Zhong Shan Da Xue Ji Di** (中山大学极地; "Sun Yat-sen University Polar") (2021–; ex-Beijing Ocean Leader, ex-Ikaluk, ex-Smit Sibu, ex-Canmar Ikaluk)

=== Chinese Academy of Sciences ===
- **Tan Suo San Hao** (探索三号; "Discovery Three") (2024–)

=== Other ===
- Bin Hai 293 (滨海293; "Coastal 293") (1997–2016; ex-Robert LeMeur; broken up)
- Beijing Ocean Leader (北京号破冰船) (2018–2021; ex-Ikaluk, ex-Smit Sibu, ex-Canmar Ikaluk; sold to Sun Yat-sen University)

== Chile ==
=== Chilean Navy ===
- Piloto Pardo (1959–1997; sold to a private company)
- Almirante Óscar Viel (1995–2019; ex-Norman McLeod Rogers; decommissioned and later sunk as target)
- **Almirante Viel** (2024–)

== Denmark ==
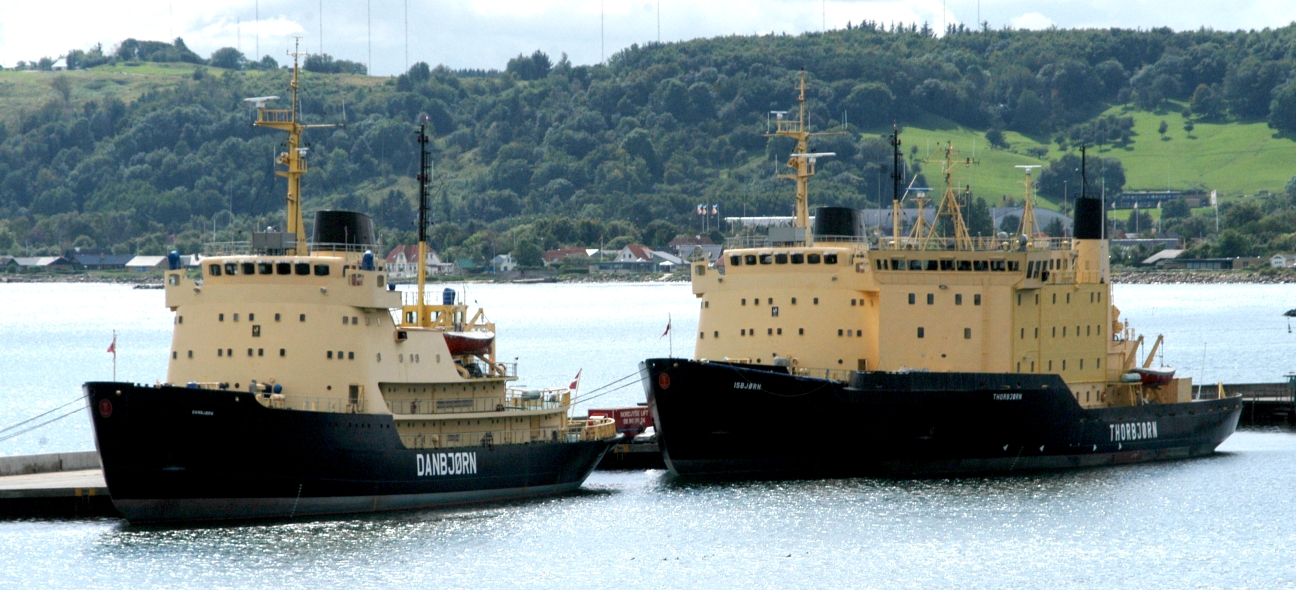
Danbjørn, Isbjørn and Thorbjørn moored at Frederikshavn

- Bryderen (1884–1947; sold to Poland; broken up in 1960)
- Isbjørn (1923–1965)
- Lillebjørn (1926–1968)
- Storebjørn (1931–1974; broken up)
- Elbjørn (1954–1996; used as a restaurant ship until sold for scrap in 2019)
- Danbjørn (1965–2013; sold for scrap in 2023)
- Isbjørn (1966–2013; sold for scrap in 2023)
- Thorbjørn (1980–2015; sold to a private company)

== Estonia ==
=== Estonian Maritime Museum ===
- Suur Tõll (1922–1940; museum ship in Tallinn since 1987)

=== Estonian Maritime Administration ===
- **Tarmo** (1993–; purchased from Finland)
- **EVA 316** (1995–; ex-Lonna; purchased from Finland and converted for icebreaking)

=== Port of Tallinn ===
- Karu (1988–2002; ex-Karhu, ex-Kapitan Chubakov; purchased from Finland and sold to Russia)
- **Botnica** (2012–; purchased from Finland)

== Finland ==
=== State-owned icebreakers ===
==== Steam-powered ====
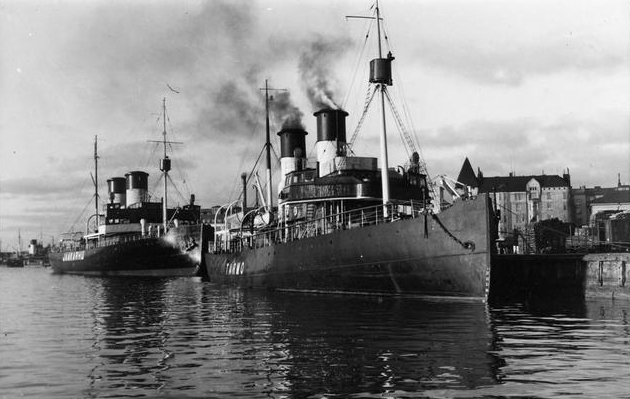
Steam-powered icebreakers Tarmo and Jääkarhu

- Murtaja (1890–1958; broken up)
- Sampo (1898–1960; broken up)
- Apu (1899–1959; broken up)
- Tarmo (1907–1970; museum ship in Kotka since 1992)
- Wäinämöinen (1918–1922; ex-Volynets; captured from Russia and handed over to Estonia)
- Ilmarinen (1918–1922; ex-Silatch; captured from Russia and handed over to the Soviet Union)
- Voima (1924–1945; handed over to the Soviet Union as war reparations)
- Jääkarhu (1926–1945; handed over to the Soviet Union as war reparations)

==== Diesel-electric ====
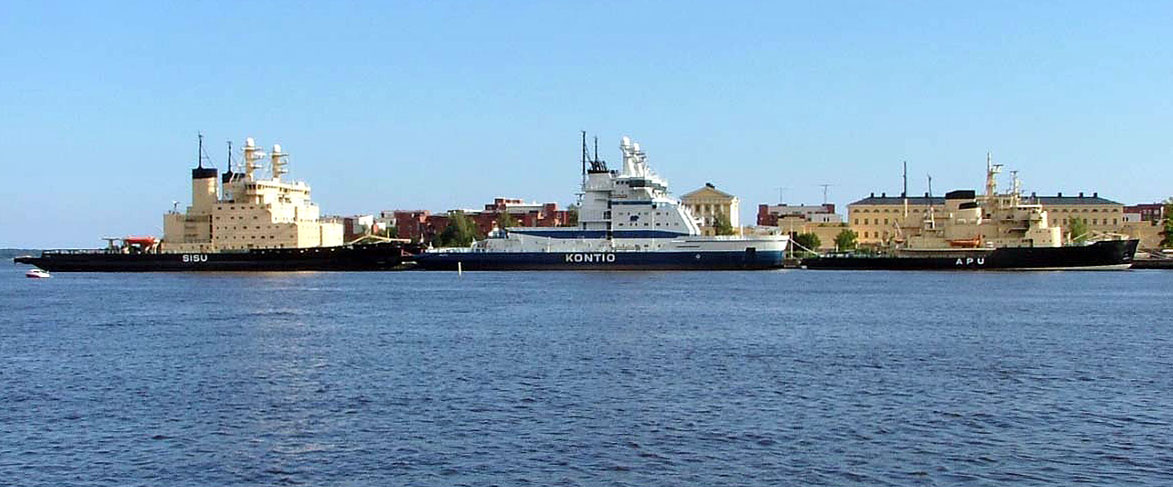
Six modern Finnish icebreakers docked for the summer season at Katajanokka, Helsinki

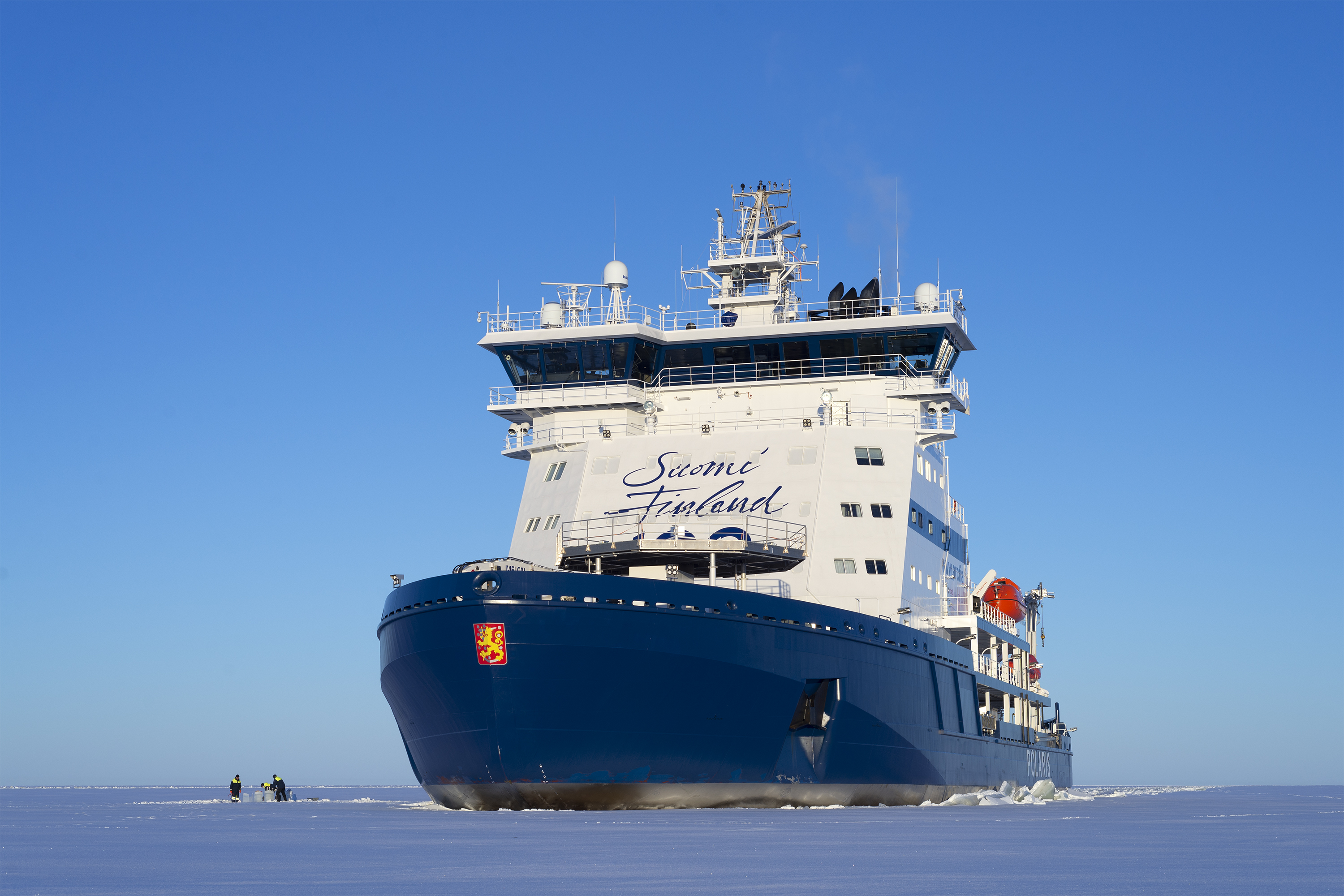
Polaris was completed in the 2010s

- Sisu (1939–1974; transferred to the Finnish Navy)
- **Voima** (1954–)
- Karhu class
  - Karhu (1958–1986; sold to Estonia)
  - Murtaja (1959–1986; broken up)
  - Sampo (1961–1987; sold to the city of Kemi)
- Tarmo class
  - Tarmo (1963–1993; sold to Estonia)
  - Varma (1968–1994; sold to Latvia)
  - Apu (1970–2006; sold to Russia)
- Hanse (1966–1998; sold to Greece; wrecked off Tunisia)
- Urho class
  - **Urho** (1975–)
  - **Sisu** (1976–)
- Otso class
  - **Otso** (1986–)
  - **Kontio** (1987–)
- Multipurpose icebreakers
  - **Fennica** (1993–)
  - **Nordica** (1994–)
  - Botnica (1998–2012; sold to Estonia)
- **Polaris** (2016–)
- A new icebreaker is expected to enter service in 2029.

=== Finnish Environment Institute ===
- Aranda (1953–1989; sold)
- **Aranda** (1989–)

=== Finnish Navy ===
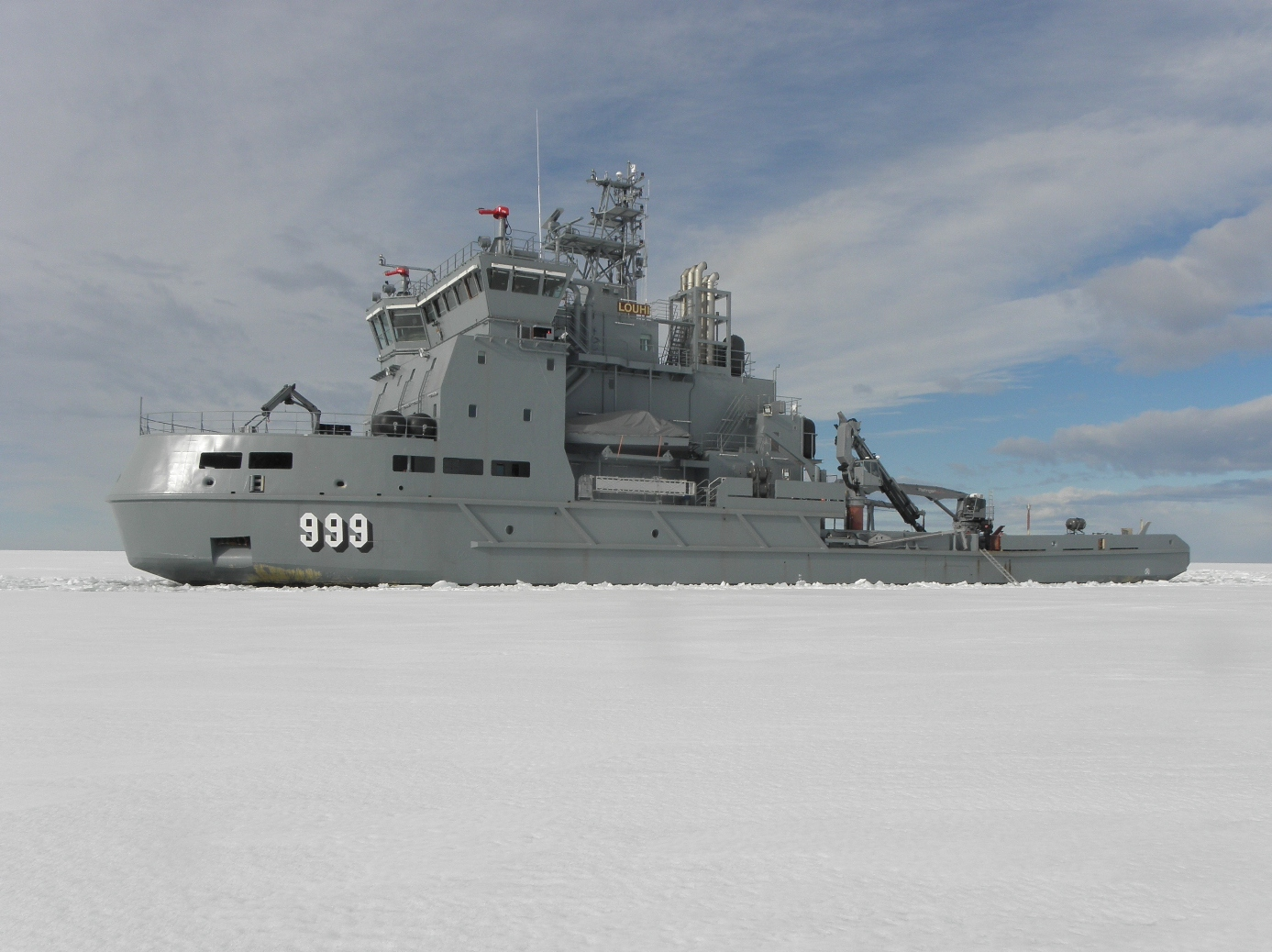
Louhi was completed in the 2010s

- Louhi (1975–1986; ex-Sisu; broken up)
- **Louhi** (2011–)

=== Alfons Håkans ===
- **Zeus of Finland** (1995–; ex-Zeus)
- Thetis (2016–2023; ex-Storm Express, ex-Maersk Shipper, ex-Maersk Placentia, ex-Placentia Bay; sold to Russia)

=== City of Kemi ===
- **Sampo** (1987–)

=== City of Helsinki ===
- Otso (1936–1970s; sold)
- Turso (1944–1945; handed over to the Soviet Union as war reparations)
- Teuvo (1975–1985; sold and later converted to pusher tug)

== France ==
=== French Navy ===
- **L'Astrolabe** (2017–)

=== Compagnie du Ponant ===
- **Le Commandant Charcot** (2021–)

=== Other ===
- L'Astrolabe (1988–2017; ex-Austral Fish, ex-Fort Resolution; decommissioned and sold to a private company)

== Germany ==
=== Historical ===
- Elbe (1911–??; museum ship)
- Hindenburg (1916–1918; sunk by mine)
- Stettin (1933–1981; museum ship)
- Wal (1938–1990; museum ship)
- Castor (1941–1945; sunk by mine but later raised by the Soviet Union)
- Eisvogel (1942–1945; handed over to the Soviet Union)
- Eisbär (1942–1946; handed over to the Soviet Union)
- Pollux (1943–1945; sunk by mine)

=== Alfred-Wegener-Institut ===
- **Polarstern** (1982–)
- New icebreaking polar research vessel Polarstern II is expected to enter service in 2030.

=== Other ===
- Eisvogel class
  - Eisvogel (1961–2006; sold)
  - Eisbär (1961–1997; sold)
- Max Waldeck (1966–2006; broken up; fitted with Thyssen-Waas bow in 1981)
- Stephan Jantzen (1967–2005; museum ship)
- **Neuwerk** (1997–)
- **Arkona** (2004–)

== Italy ==
- **Laura Bassi** (2019–; ex-RRS Ernest Shackleton; purchased from the United Kingdom)

== Japan ==
=== Tatsunan Kisen Co. ===
- Tenryō Maru-class (ice-strengthened cargo/transport)
  - Tenryō Maru (1938-1941; taken by the Army)
  - Minryō Maru (1938-1941; taken by the Army)
  - Chiryō Maru (1938–1940; taken by the Navy as Sōya, now a museum ship)

=== Imperial Japanese Navy ===
- Ōtomari (1921–1945; broken up)
- Tenryō Maru-class (ice-strengthened cargo/transport)
  - Sōya (1940–1945; transferred to the Japan government and later the coast guards; now a museum ship)

=== Imperial Japanese Army ===
- Tenryō Maru-class (ice-strengthened cargo/transport)
  - Tenryō Maru (1941-1945)
  - Minryō Maru (1941-1945)
- Takatsu Maru (1944-1944; landing craft carrier with icebreaker capability)

=== Japan Maritime Self-Defense Force ===
- Fuji (1965–1985; museum ship)
- Shirase (1981–2008; sold to a private company)
- **Shirase** (2008–)

=== Japan Coast Guard ===
- Sōya (PL107) (1945–1978; museum ship)
- Sōya (PHL01) (1978–2025)
- **Teshio** (PM 15) (1995–)
- **Sōya** (PHL01) (2025–)

=== Japan Agency for Marine-Earth Science and Technology ===
- Mirai II (2027– (planned); under construction)

== Kazakhstan ==
The following icebreaking supply ships are operating or have operated in the Kazakh Caspian Sea oil fields:

- Arcticaborg (1998–2018; transferred to Canada)
- Antarcticaborg (1998–2019; sold to Russia)
- **Tulpar** (2002–)
- Mangystau-class icebreaking tugs
  - Mangystau-1 (2010–2023; transferred to Turkmenian flag)
  - Mangystau-2 (2010–2020; transferred to Turkmenian flag)
  - **Mangystau-3** (2011–)
  - **Mangystau-4** (2011–)
  - **Mangystau-5** (2011–)

=== Kazakhstani Coast Guard ===
- **Kazhymukan** (2016–)

=== Ministry of Emergency Situations of the Republic of Kazakhstan ===
- **Ledokol-2** (1984–)

== Latvia ==
- Krišjānis Valdemārs (1925–1941; sunk)
- **Varma** (1994–)
- Foros (2013–2024; ex-Fobos; sold to Russia)

== Netherlands ==
=== Greenpeace ===
- **Arctic Sunrise** (1995–)

=== Other ===
- Nabil (2022–; completed but not delivered to Russia due to sanctions)

== Norway ==
=== Norwegian Coast Guard ===
- **NoCGV Svalbard** (2001–)

=== Norwegian Polar Institute ===
- **Kronprins Haakon** (2018–)

=== GC Rieber ===
- Polar Circle (1990–1991; first chartered and then sold to the United Kingdom)
- Polar Queen (1995–1999; chartered to the United Kingdom)
- Polarbjørn (2001–2011; sold to the United Kingdom)
- Polar Circle (2022–2024; ex-Polar Pevek; acquired from Russian subsidiary; sold to Sweden)

=== Other ===
- Norhope (1970–1973; ex-Göta Lejon; broken up in 1974)

== Poland ==
- **Kuna** (1884–; oldest in service river icebreaker in the world)
- Perkun (1963–1993; broken up)

== Russia ==
=== Icebreakers ===
The following lists include icebreakers owned and/or operated by either Russian governmental or commercial entities.

==== Nuclear-powered icebreakers ====
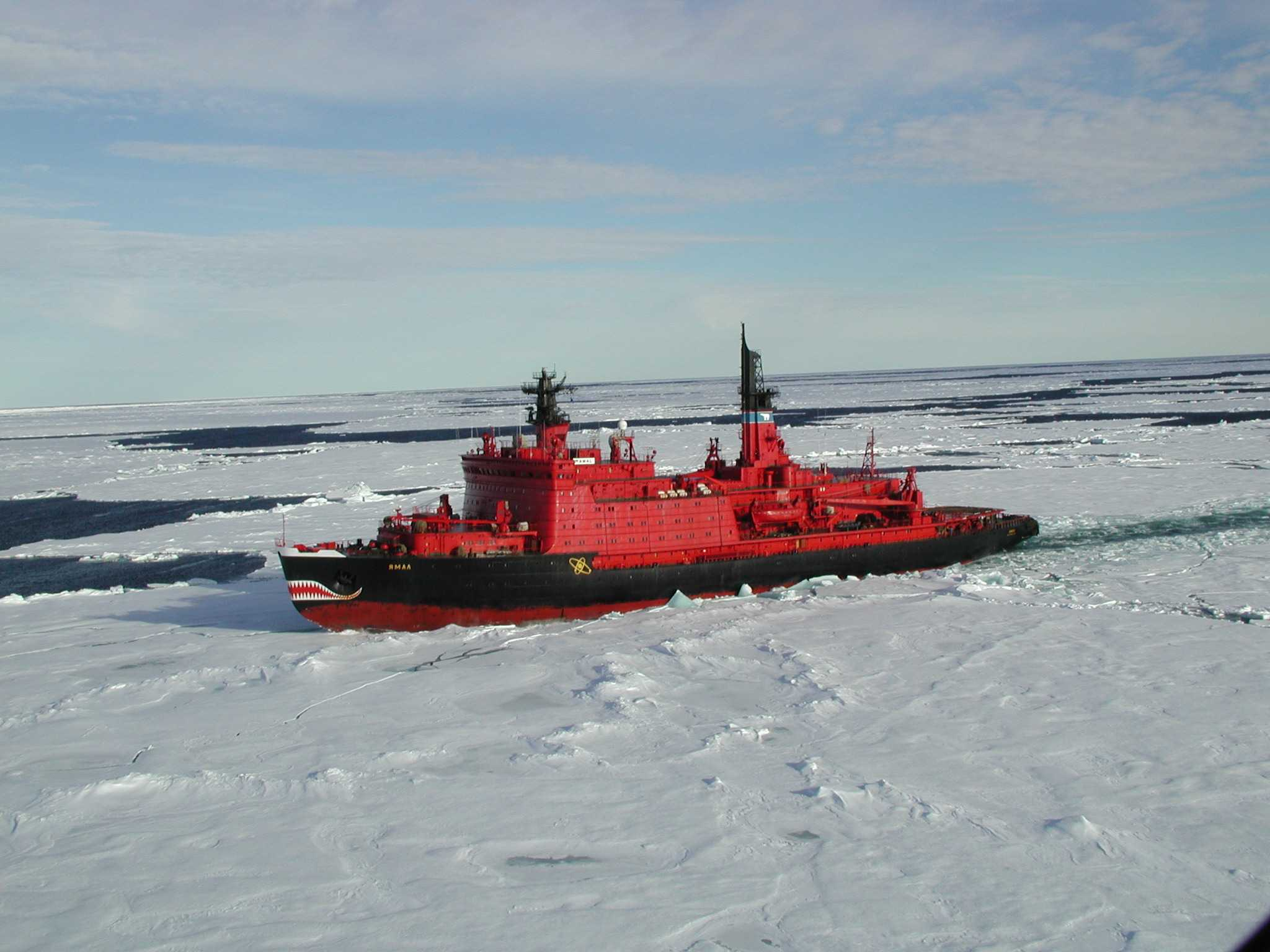
Russian nuclear-powered icebreaker Yamal

The following ships are nuclear-powered icebreakers;

- Lenin (1959–1989; museum ship in Murmansk)
- Arktika class
  - Arktika (1975–2008; ex-Leonid Brezhnev, ex-Arktika; decommissioned)
  - Sibir (1977–1992; decommissioned)
  - Rossiya (1985–2013; decommissioned)
  - Sovetskiy Soyuz (1990–2014; decommissioned)
  - **Yamal** (1992–)
  - **50 Let Pobedy** (2007–)
- Taymyr class
  - **Taymyr** (1989–)
  - **Vaygach** (1990–)
- Project 22220
  - **Arktika** (2020–)
  - **Sibir** (2021–)
  - **Ural** (2022–)
  - **Yakutiya** (2025–)
  - Chukotka (2027– (planned); under construction)
  - Leningrad (2028– (planned); under construction)
  - Stalingrad (2030– (planned); under construction)
- Project 10510
  - Rossiya (2030– (current estimate); under construction)

==== Diesel-powered icebreakers ====
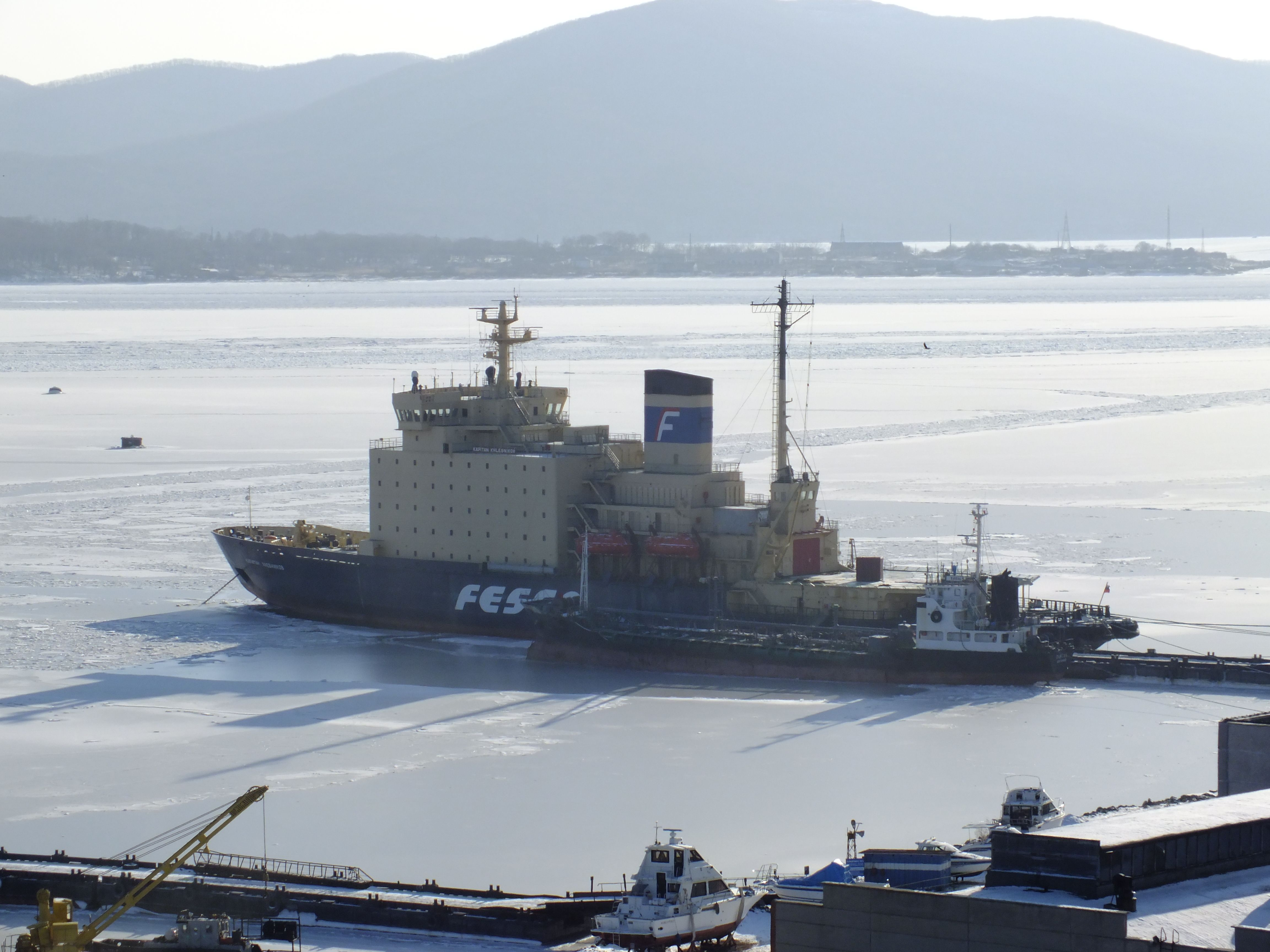
Icebreaker Kapitan Khlebnikov in Vladivostok

The following ships are/were fitted with diesel engines for powering their propulsion;

- Wind class
  - Severny Veter (1944–1951; ex-USCGC Staten Island; returned to the United States)
  - Severniy Polyus (1945–1951; ex-USS Westwind; returned to the United States)
  - Admiral Makarov (1945–1949; ex-USCGC Southwind; returned to the United States)
- Kapitan Belousov class
  - **Kapitan Belousov** (1954–1991; 2023–; sold to Ukraine in 1991 and captured in 2023)
  - Kapitan Voronin (1955–1996; broken up)
  - Kapitan Melekhov (1956–1994; broken up)
- Moskva class
  - Moskva (1959–1998; broken up)
  - Leningrad (1960–1993; broken up)
  - Kiev (1965–1993; broken up)
  - Murmansk (1968–1995; broken up)
  - Vladivostok (1969–1997; broken up)
- Civilian variants of Dobrynya Nikitich class (Project 97A)
  - Vasiliy Pronchishchev (1961–1989; ex-Ledokol-1; broken up)
  - Afanasy Nikitin (1962–1992; ex-Ledokol-2; passed over to Ukraine)
  - Khariton Laptev (1962–1996; ex-Ledokol-3; broken up)
  - Vasiliy Poyarkov (1963–1988; ex-Ledokol-4; broken up)
  - Yerofey Khabarov (1963–1993; ex-Ledokol-5; broken up)
  - **Ivan Kruzenstern** (1964–; ex-Ledokol-6)
  - Vladimir Rusanov (1964–1988; ex-Ledokol-7; broken up)
  - Semyon Chelyuskin (1965–1988; ex-Ledokol-8; broken up)
  - Yuriy Lisyanskiy (1965–2021; ex-Ledokol-9; broken up)
  - Fyodor Litke (1970–2013; broken up)
  - Ivan Moskvitin (1971–1997; broken up)
  - **Semyon Dezhnev** (1971–)
- Ermak class
  - Ermak (1974–2021; broken up)
  - **Admiral Makarov** (1975–)
  - **Krasin** (1976–)
- Kapitan M. Izmaylov class
  - **Kapitan M. Izmaylov** (1976–)
  - **Kapitan Kosolapov** (1976–)
  - Kapitan A. Radzhabov (1976–1992; transferred to Azerbaijan)
- Kapitan Sorokin class
  - **Kapitan Sorokin** (1977–; fitted with Thyssen-Waas bow in 1991)
  - **Kapitan Nikolaev** (1978–; fitted with a new bow in 1990)
  - **Kapitan Dranitsyn** (1980–)
  - **Kapitan Khlebnikov** (1981–)
- Kapitan Chechkin class
  - **Kapitan Chechkin** (1977–)
  - **Kapitan Plakhin** (1977–)
  - **Kapitan Chadaev** (1978–)
  - **Kapitan Krutov** (1978–)
  - **Kapitan Bukaev** (1978–)
  - **Kapitan Zarubin** (1978–)
- Mudyug class
  - **Mudyug** (1982–; fitted with Thyssen-Waas bow in 1986)
  - **Magadan** (1982–)
  - **Dikson** (1983–)
- Kapitan Evdokimov class
  - **Kapitan Evdokimov** (1983–)
  - **Kapitan Babichev** (1983–)
  - **Kapitan Chudinov** (1983–)
  - **Kapitan Borodkin** (1983–)
  - **Avraamiy Zavenyagin** (1984–)
  - **Kapitan Metsayk** (1984–)
  - **Kapitan Deminov** (1984–)
  - **Kapitan Moshkin** (1986–)
- **Tor** (2000–; purchased from Sweden)
- Karu (2002–2020; ex-Karhu, ex-Kapitan Chubakov; purchased from Estonia; broken up)
- **Dudinka** (2006–; ex-Apu; purchased from Finland)
- Project 21900
  - **Moskva** (2008–)
  - **Sankt-Peterburg** (2009–)
- Project 21900M
  - **Vladivostok** (2015–)
  - **Murmansk** (2015–)
  - **Novorossiysk** (2016–)
- **Ob** (2019–)
- **Georgiy Sedov** (2019–; ex-Antarcticaborg; purchased from Kazakhstan)
- **Viktor Chernomyrdin** (2020–)
- Vyborg (2028– (latest estimate); under construction)
- Project 22740M
  - Unnamed Project 22740M icebreaker (2027– (planned); under construction)
  - Unnamed Project 22740M icebreaker (2028– (planned); under construction)

==== Steam-powered icebreakers ====
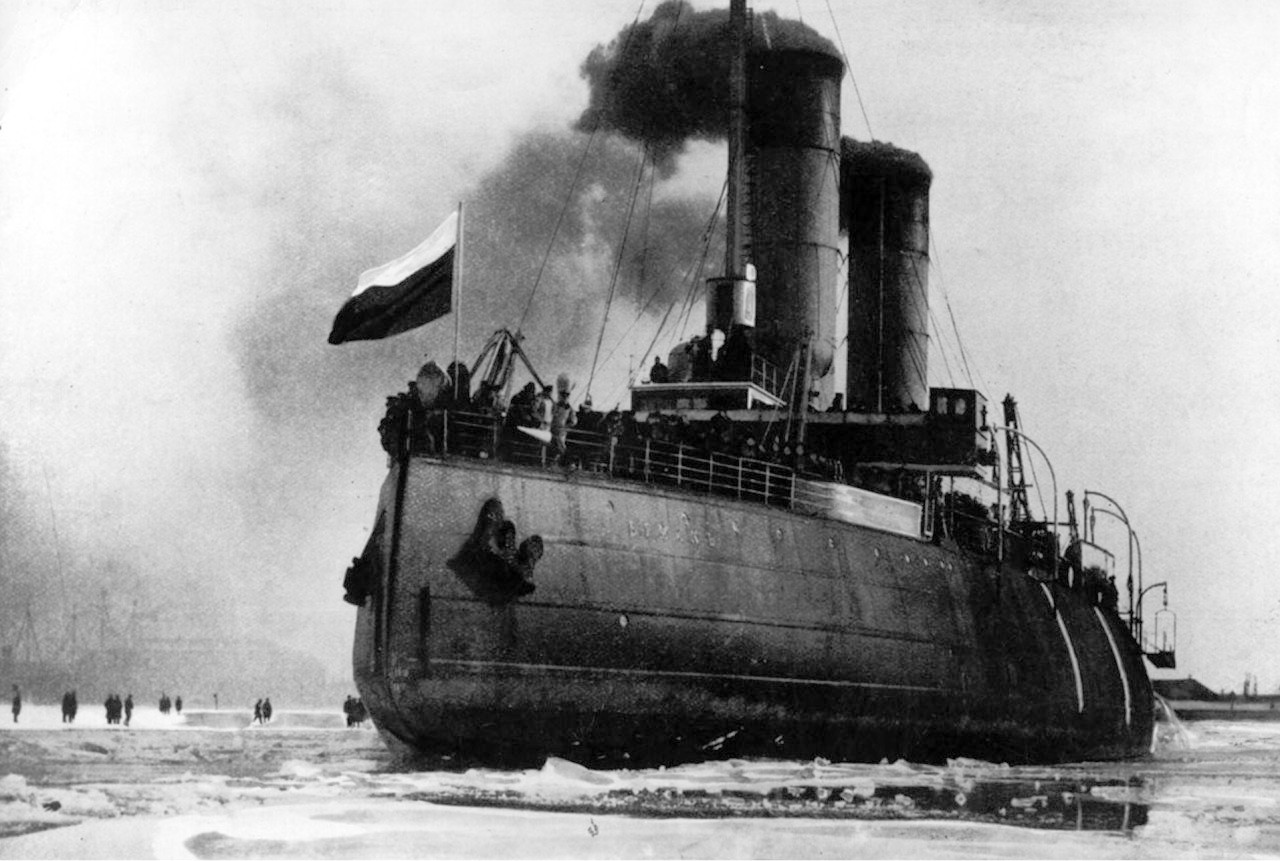
Steam-powered icebreaker Yermak

The following icebreakers and icebreaking ships were powered by steam;

- Pilot (1864–1890; broken up?)
- Ledokol 1 (1890–1915; later converted to a gunboat)
- Ledokol 2 (1895–1923; handed over to Latvia)
- Saratovskiy Ledokol (1895–1968; sunk)
- Nadeshnyy (1897–1924; later converted to a gunboat)
- Yermak (1899–1963; broken up)
- Gaydamak (1898–1930; broken up)
- Ledokol 3 (1899–1923; broken up)
- Angara (1900–19??; now a museum ship in Irkutsk)
- Ledokol IV (1907–1942; sunk by Germans)
- Vaygach (1909–1918; sank in 1918)
- Taymyr (1909–1950s?; broken up)
- Silatch (1910–1918, 1922–late 1950s; broken up)
- Malygin (1912–1940; sunk in 1940)
- Pyotr Velikiy (1912–1915; sunk in 1915)
- Truvor (1914–1941; ex-Sleipner (1896–1914); purchased from Denmark; sunk in 1941)
- Volynets (1914–1918, 1940–1985; ex-Tsar' Mikhail Fyodorovich, ex-Wäinämöinen, ex-Suur Tõll; sold to Estonia in 1987)
- Fyodor Litke (1914–1958; ex-CGC Earl Grey; purchased from Canada; broken up)
- Ilya Muromets (1915–1920; interned and sold to France)
- Semyon Dezhnev (1915–1918; ex-Adventure (1909–1915); purchased from Canada; sunk in 1918)
- Georgiy Sedov (1915–1967; ex-Beothic (1909–1915); purchased from Canada; broken up)
- Sadko (1915–1941; ex-Lintrose (1912–1915); sunk in 1941)
- Skuratov (1915–1922; ex-CGS Minto (1899–1915), ex-Ivan Susanin (1915–1920), ex-Leitenant Dreyer (1920–1921); purchased from Canada; sank in 1922)
- Dobrynya Nikitich (1916–1971; broken up)
- Mikula Seleaninovich (1916–1918)
- Vladimir Rusanov (1916–1967; ex-Bonaventure (1909–1916); purchased from Canada; broken up)
- A. Sibiryakov (1917–1942; ex-Bellaventure (1909–1917); purchased from Canada; sunk by Germans)
- Ledokol V (1916–1941; sank in 1941)
- Ledokol VI (1916–1961; broken up)
- Ledokol VII (1916–1954; broken up)
- Ledokol VIII (1917–1961; broken up)
- Ledokol IX (1917–1932; sank in White Sea)
- Krasin (1917–1971; extensively rebuilt in 1953–1960, now a museum ship in St. Petersburg)
- Lenin (1917–1968; broken up)
- Stepan Makarov (1917–1941; ex-Lieutenant Schmidt; ex-Knyaz Pozharskiy; sunk)
- Toros (1929–1964)
- Sibir (1938–1973; ex-I. Stalin (−1961); broken up)
- Admiral Lazarev (1938–1967; ex-L. Kaganovich (−1951); broken up)
- Admiral Makarov (1941–1967; ex-V. Molotov (−1956); broken up)
- A. Mikoyan (1941–1968; broken up)
- Malygin (1945–1970; ex-Voima; broken up)
- Sibiryakov (1945–1972; ex-Jääkarhu; broken up)
- Alyosha Popovich (1945–1970; ex-Eisvogel; decommissioned and abandoned off Russky Island)
- Ilya Muromets (1946–1979; ex-Eisbär; broken up in 1981)
- Peresvet (1951–1980; ex-Castor; decommissioned and abandoned off Reyneke Island)

=== Other icebreaking vessels ===
==== Rescue and salvage vessels ====
- Stroptivyy class
  - Stroptivyy (1979–1992; sold to a private company and later broken up)
  - **Spravedlivyy** (1980–)
  - Stakhanovets (1980–2012; laid up)
  - **Suvorovets** (1980–)
  - **Sibirskiy** (1980–)
  - **Foros** (1983–2014, 2024–; ex-Fobos; sold to Latvia in 2014 and purchased back in 2024)
  - Deimos (1983–2002; sold to a private company and later broken up)
- **Baltika** (2014–)
- Project MPSV06
  - **Beringov Proliv** (2015–)
  - **Murman** (2015–)
  - **Kerchenskiy Proliv** (2025–)
- Project MPSV06M
  - Pevek (2026– (latest estimate); under construction)
  - Anadyr (under construction)
- Boris Lavrov (under construction)

==== Offshore vessels ====
The following Russian-owned, -operated and/or -flagged icebreaking anchor handling tug supply vessels, platform supply vessels, standby vessels etc. are or have been engaged primarily in offshore oil and gas projects:

- Ikaluk (1998–2018; ex-Ikaluk, ex-Canmar Ikaluk, ex-Smit Sibu; sold to China)
- Smit Sakhalin (1998–2017; ex-Miscaroo, ex-Canmar Miscaroo; broken up)
- Kigoriak (2003–2022; ex-Canmar Kigoriak, ex-Kigoria, ex-Talagy; broken up)
- Vladimir Ignatyuk (2003–2018; ex-Arctic Kalvik; laid up)
- **SCF Sakhalin** (2005–; ex-FESCO Sakhalin)
- **SCF Enterprise** (2006–; ex-Pacific Enterprise)
- **SCF Endeavour** (2006–; ex-Pacific Endeavour)
- **SCF Endurance** (2006–; ex-Pacific Endurance)
- Polar Pevek (2006–2022)
- **Hermes** (2006–; ex-Yury Topchev)
- **Antey** (2006–; ex-Vladislav Strizhov)
- **Toboy** (2008–)
- **Varandey** (2008–)
- Vidar Viking (2012–2016; charter under Russian flag)
- **Vitus Bering** (2012–)
- **Aleksey Chirikov** (2013–)
- **Aleut** (2015–)
- **Pomor** (2016–)
- **Normann** (2016–)
- **Gennadiy Nevelskoy** (2017–)
- **Stepan Makarov** (2017–)
- **Fedor Ushakov** (2017–)
- **Yevgeny Primakov** (2018–)
- **Aleksandr Sannikov** (2018–)
- **Andrey Vilkitskiy** (2018–)
- **Arcticaborg** (2019–)
- **Titan** (2023–; ex-Thetis; purchased from Finland)
- Katerina Velikaya (under construction)
- Svyataya Mariya (under construction)
- Aleksandr Nevskiy (under construction)
- Vladimir Monomakh (under construction)

In addition, the following shallow-draught icebreaking offshore vessels operate in the Russian sector of the Caspian Sea oil fields:

- **Arctic** (2012–)
- **Antarctic** (2017–)
- **Polar** (2021–)
- **Polus** (2021–)

==== Patrol and naval vessels ====
The following icebreakers and other icebreaking vessels are or have been in service with the Russian Navy, Russian Border Guard, and their predecessors:

- Purga (1957–1990; broken up)
- Dobrynya Nikitich class (Project 97) and its variants
  - Dobronya Nikitich (1960–1998; broken up)
  - Purga (1961–2012; broken up)
  - Vyuga (1962–1991; broken up)
  - Ilya Muromets (1965–1993; broken up)
  - **Buran** (1966–)
  - Sadko (1968–2022; expended as target)
  - Peresvet (1970–2011; broken up)
  - Ivan Susanin class (Project 97P)
    - **Ivan Susanin** (1973–)
    - Aysberg (1974–2006; broken up)
    - **Ruslan** (1975–)
    - Anadyr (1976–2019; ex-Dnepr, ex-Imeni XXV syezda KPSS; broken up)
    - Dunay (1977–2017; broken up)
    - **Neva** (1978–)
    - **Volga** (1980–)
    - Murmansk (1981–2013; ex-Imeni XXVI syezda KPSS, ex-Irtysh; broken up)
- **Ilya Muromets** (2017–)
- Project 21180M
  - **Evpatiy Kolovrat** (2024–)
  - Svyatogor (2027– (planned); under construction)
- Project 23550
  - **Ivan Papanin** (2025–)
  - Nikolay Zubov (2024– (original plan); under construction)
  - Purga (2024– (original plan); under construction; damaged in a Ukrainian drone attack in March 2026)
  - Dzerzhinsky (under construction)

==== Research and survey vessels ====
- Dobrynya Nikitich class (Project 97) variants
  - Pyotr Pakhtusov (1966–1997; ex-Mendeleev, ex-Ledokol-10; broken up)
  - Georgiy Sedov (1967–1992; broken up)
  - Vladimir Kavrayskiy (1969–2012; used as stationary floating barracks PKZ-86)
  - Otto Schmidt (1979–1991; broken up)
- **Mikhail Somov** (1975–)
- **Akademik Fedorov** (1987–)
- **Akademik Tryoshnikov** (2012–)
- Ivan Frolov (2028– (planned); under construction)

== South Africa ==
- S. A. Agulhas (1977–2012; retired from Antarctic service and used as a training ship)
- **S. A. Agulhas II** (2012–)

== South Korea ==
- **Araon** (2009–)
- Unnamed new research vessel (2030– (planned); under construction)

== Soviet Union ==
See Russia

== Sweden ==
=== Swedish Maritime Administration ===
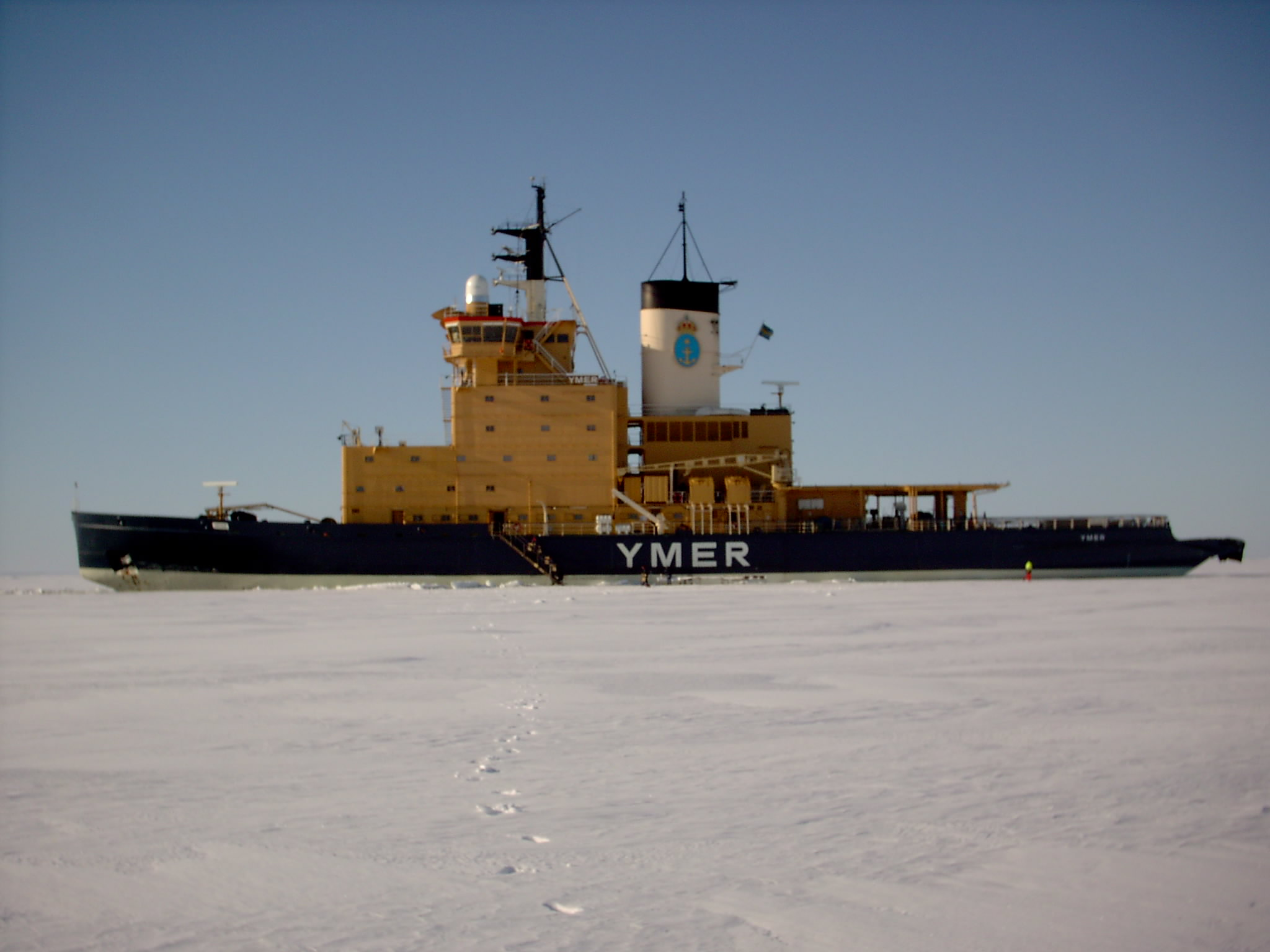
Swedish icebreaker Ymer

- Sankt Erik (1915–1977; ex-Isbrytaren II (−1959); museum ship since 1977)
- Atle (1926–1967; ex-Statsisbrytaren (−1931); broken up)
- Ymer (1933–1977; broken up)
- Thule (1953–1998; broken up)
- Oden (1957–1988; broken up)
- Tor (1964–2000; sold to Russia)
- Njord (1969–2000; sold and renamed Polar Star)
- **Ale** (1973–)
- Atle class
  - **Atle** (1974–)
  - **Frej** (1975–)
  - **Ymer** (1977–)
- **Oden** (1988–)
- **Idun** (2024–; purchased from Norway)
- Unnamed new icebreaker (2029– (planned); ordered)

In addition, the following ice-capable fairway support vessels are regularly used for icebreaking:

- **Baltica** (1982–)
- **Scandica** (1983–)

=== Trans Viking Icebreaking & Offshore ===
Three icebreaking anchor handling tug supply vessels were chartered by the Swedish Maritime Administration for escort icebreaking duties in the Baltic Sea until 2015.

- Tor Viking II (2000–2015; as Tor Viking under Norwegian flag until 2003)
- Balder Viking (2000–2015)
- Vidar Viking (2001–2012; contract ended prematurely)

=== Other ===
- Göta Lejon (1932–1963; sold to Norway in 1970)

== Turkmenistan ==
- Mangystau-2 (2020–2021; sold to Canada)
- **Mangystau-1** (2023–)

== Ukraine ==
- Afanasy Nikitin (1962–1995; broken up)
- Kapitan Belousov (1991–2023; damaged and later captured by Russia)
- **Noosfera** (2021–; ex-James Clark Ross; purchased from United Kingdom)

== United Kingdom ==
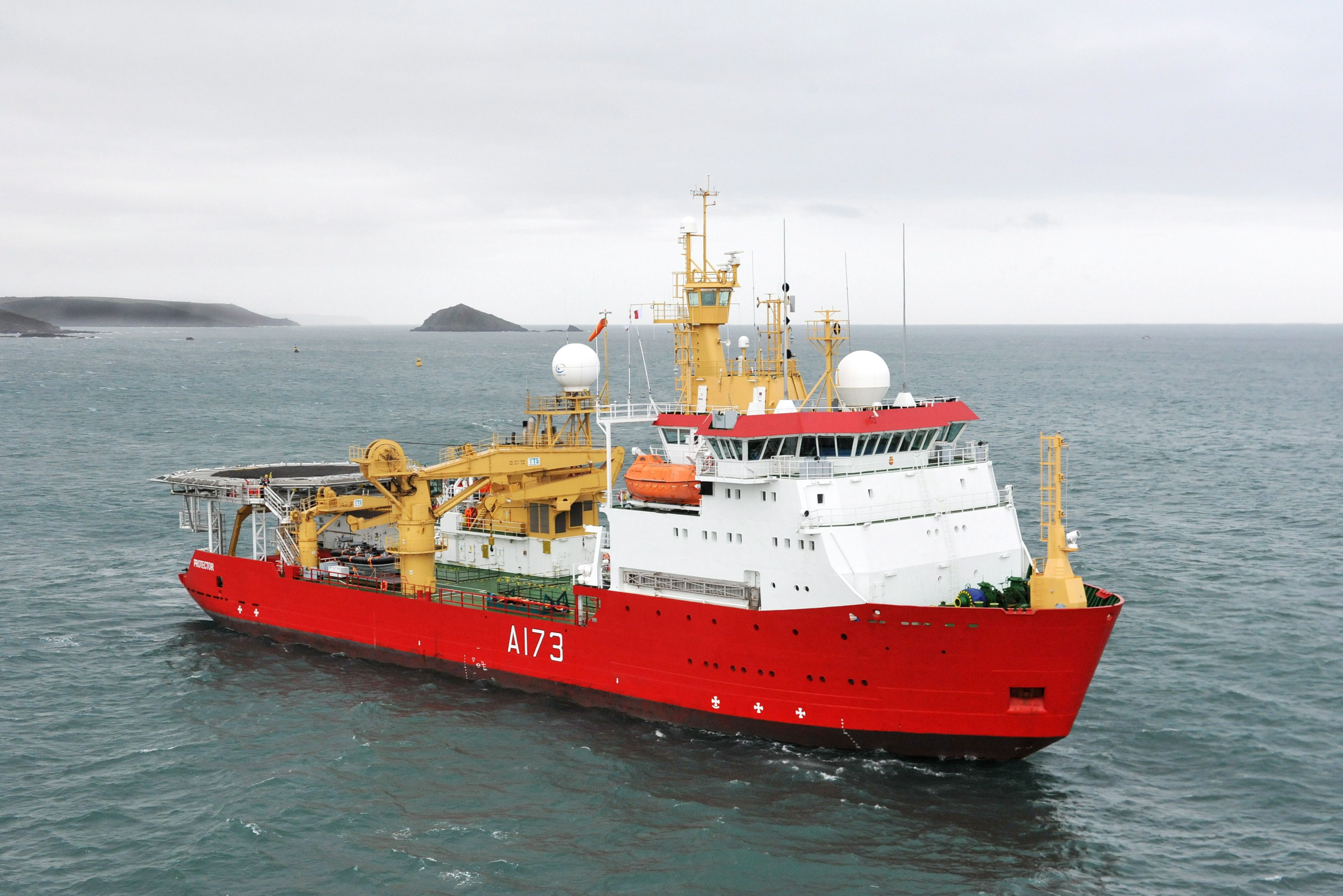
HMS Protector

=== Royal Navy ===
- HMS Endurance (1991–2008; ex-Polar Circle; broken up)
- **HMS Protector** (2011–; ex-Polarbjørn)

=== British Antarctic Survey ===
- RRS James Clark Ross (1991–2021; sold to Ukraine)
- RRS Ernest Shackleton (1999–2019; ex-Polar Queen; sold to Italy)
- **RRS Sir David Attenborough** (2020–)

== United States ==
=== United States Coast Guard ===
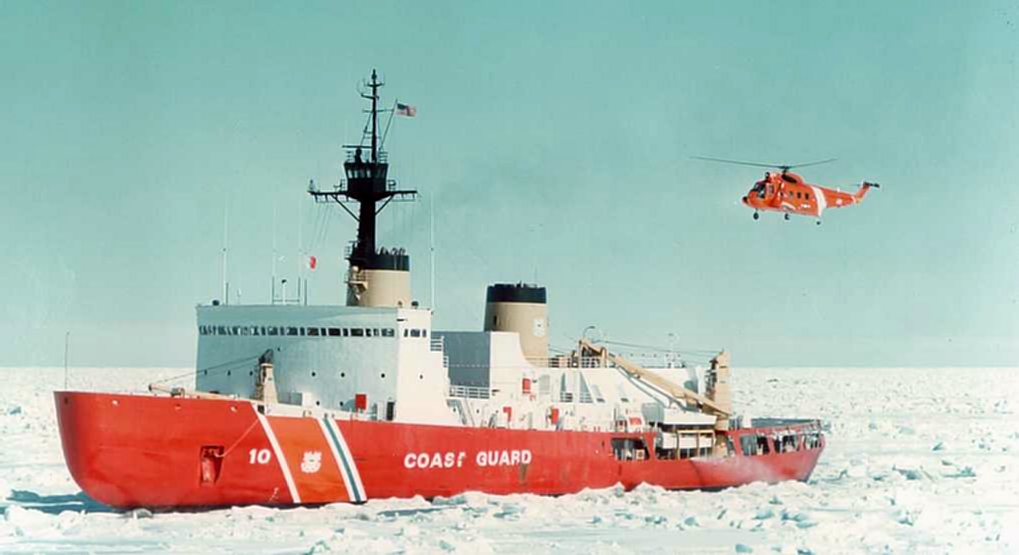
USCGC Polar Star (WAGB-10)

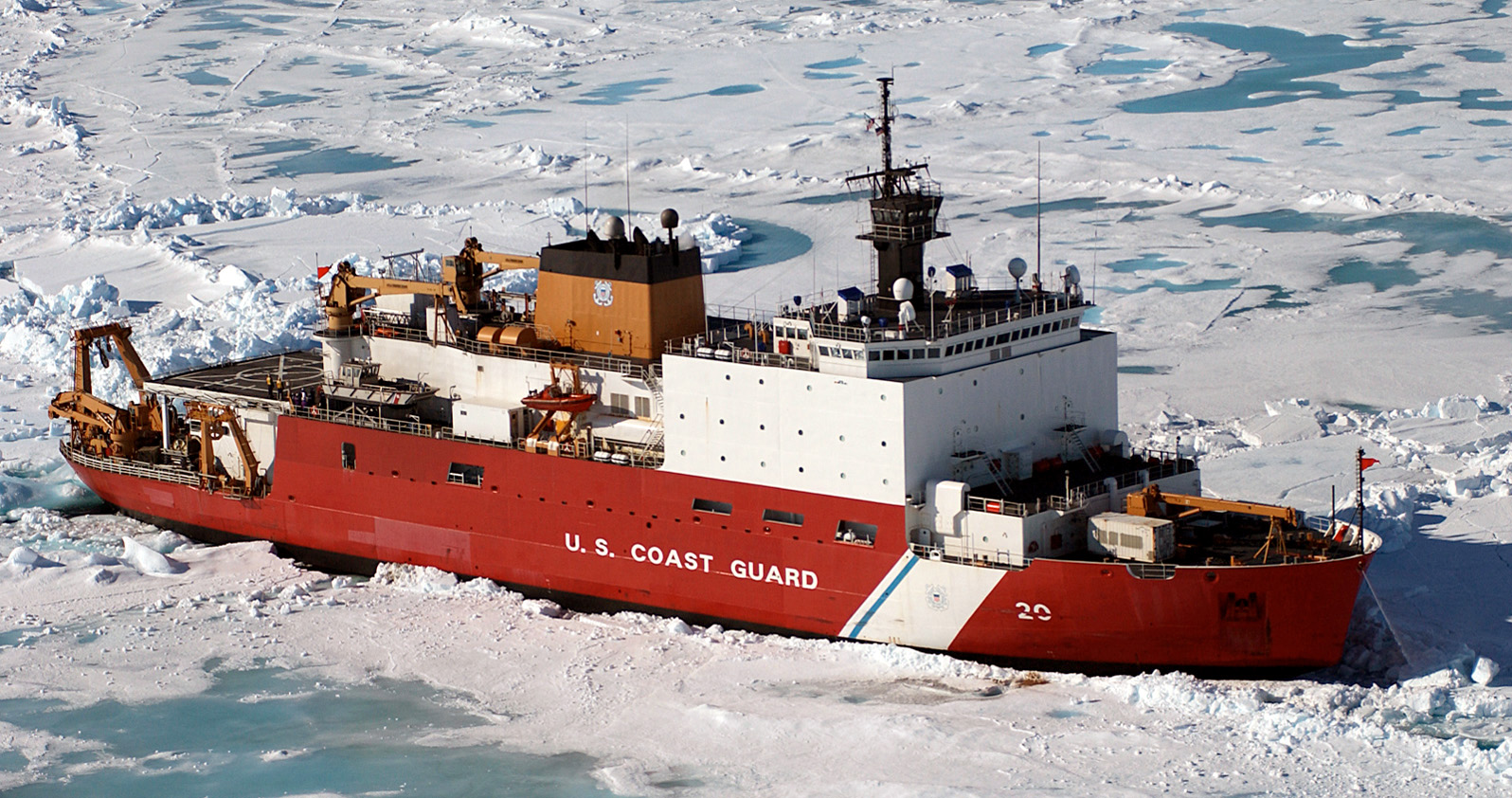
USCGC Healy

- USCGC Storis (WMEC-38) (1942–2007; broken up)
- USCGC Mackinaw (WAGB-83) (1944–2006; museum ship)
- Wind class
  - USCGC Staten Island (WAGB-278) (1944–1974; ex-Severny Veter, ex-Northwind; broken up)
  - USCGC Eastwind (WAGB-279) (1944–1968; broken up in 1976–1977)
  - USCGC Southwind (WAGB-280) (1944–1974; ex-Admiral Makarov, ex-Atka; broken up in 1976)
  - USCGC Westwind (WAGB-281) (1944–1988; ex-Severniy Polyus; broken up)
  - USCGC Northwind (WAGB-282) (1945–1989; broken up in 1999)
  - USCGC Burton Island (WAGB-283) (1946–1978; broken up in 1982)
  - USCGC Edisto (WAGB-284) (1947–1974; broken up in 1980)
- USCGC Glacier (WAGB-4) (1955–1987; broken up in 2012)
- Polar class
  - **USCGC Polar Star** (WAGB-10) (1977–2006, 2013–)
  - USCGC Polar Sea (WAGB-11) (1978–2010; inactive)
- Bay class
  - **USCGC Katmai Bay** (WTGB-101) (1979–)
  - **USCGC Bristol Bay** (WTGB-102) (1979–)
  - **USCGC Mobile Bay** (WTGB-103) (1979–)
  - **USCGC Biscayne Bay** (WTGB-104) (1979–)
  - **USCGC Neah Bay** (WTGB-105) (1980–)
  - **USCGC Morro Bay** (WTGB-106) (1981–)
  - **USCGC Penobscot Bay** (WTGB-107) (1985–)
  - **USCGC Thunder Bay** (WTGB-108) (1986–)
  - **USCGC Sturgeon Bay** (WTGB-109) (1988–)
- **USCGC Healy** (WAGB-20) (2000–)
- **USCGC Mackinaw** (WLBB-30) (2006–)
- **USCGC Storis** (WAGB-21) (2025–; ex-Aiviq)
- Polar Security Cutters
  - USCGC Polar Sentinel (WMSP-21) (2033– (latest estimate); under construction)
  - USCGC Polar Bear (WMSP-22) has been ordered
  - USCGC Polar Glacier (WMSP-23) has been authorized
- Arctic Security Cutters
  - Two Arctic Security Cutters to be built by Rauma Marine Constructions in Finland (2028– (planned); ordered)
  - Four Arctic Security Cutters to be built by Bollinger Shipyards in the United States (2029– (planned); under construction)
  - Five Arctic Security Cutters to be built by Davie Shipbuilding at Helsinki Shipyard in Finland (2028– (planned); under construction) and Gulf Copper in the United States (2030 (planned); ordered)

=== National Science Foundation ===
- Nathaniel B. Palmer (1992–2025; charter ended)
- Laurence M. Gould (1997–2024; charter ended)
- **Sikuliaq** (2014–)

=== Edison Chouest Offshore ===
- Aiviq (2012–2024; sold to the United States Coast Guard)
- Laurence M. Gould (2024–; laid up)
- Nathaniel B. Palmer (2025–; laid up)

=== Historical ===
- Ice Boat No. 3 (1873–1905; sunk in 1905)
