= Foros =

Foros may refer to:

- Foros, Crimea, a resort town in Crimea
- Foros Group, a boutique investment group headquartered in New York City
- Foros Timis Ston Greco, a classical album by Greek electronic composer and artist Vangelis
- Foros (crater), an impact crater in the Argyre quadrangle of Mars
- Foros (icebreaker), a Latvian icebreaking salvage tug

== See also ==
- Phoros, membership dues paid to Athens by the members of the Delian League in Classical Greece
