= CCGS Judy LaMarsh =

Canadian Coast Guard light icebreaker

History
- Name: Mangystau-2
- Owner: JSC Circle Maritime Invest (2010–2021); Atlantic Towing Limited (2021)
- Operator: Caspian Offshore Construction (2010–2021)
- Port of registry: Aktau, Kazakhstan (2010–2020); Türkmenbaşy, Turkmenistan (2020–2021)
- Ordered: April 2009
- Builder: STX Europe Brăila shipyard, Romania
- Yard number: 741
- Laid down: 25 June 2010
- Completed: 11 October 2010
- In service: 2010–2021
- Fate: Sold to Canada in 2021

Canada
- Name: CCGS Judy LaMarsh
- Namesake: Judy LaMarsh
- Owner: Canadian Coast Guard
- Port of registry: Ottawa, Ontario
- Acquired: 2021
- In service: 2023–present
- Refit: 2022, 2024
- Identification: IMO number: 9560120; MMSI number: 316999999
- Status: In service

General characteristics (as built)
- Type: Shallow-draught icebreaking tug
- Tonnage: 1,828 GT; 548 NT; 743 DWT
- Length: 66.3 m (217 ft 6 in)
- Beam: 16.4 m (53 ft 10 in)
- Draught: 2.5–3.0 m (8 ft 2 in – 9 ft 10 in)
- Depth: 4.4 m (14 ft 5 in)
- Ice class: In excess of 1A Super
- Installed power: 4 × Caterpillar 3512C (4 × 1,790 kW)
- Propulsion: Diesel-electric; Three Schottel SRP 2020 azimuth thrusters (3 × 1.6 MW); Two 550 kW pump-jet bow thrusters
- Speed: 12 knots (22 km/h; 14 mph)
- Capacity: 300 tonnes of deck cargo
- Crew: 12 crew; 10 supernumeraries

General characteristics (after refit)
- Type: Light icebreaker (CCG)
- Notes: Otherwise same as above

CCGS Judy LaMarsh is a Canadian Coast Guard light icebreaker. Built in 2010 as a shallow-draught icebreaking tug Mangystau-2 for the Caspian Sea oil fields, the vessel was acquired by Canada as an interim solution while the existing fleet undergoes service life extension and maintenance.

In addition to CCGS Judy LaMarsh, the Canadian Coast Guard operates four other icebreakers converted from commercial icebreaking offshore vessels: CCGS Terry Fox, CCGS Captain Molly Kool, CCGS Jean Goodwill and CCGS Vincent Massey.

== Design ==
CCGS Judy LaMarsh is 66.3 metres (217 ft 6 in) long overall and 61.87 metres (203 ft 0 in) between perpendiculars, and has a beam of 16.4 metres (53 ft 10 in). The operational draught of the shallow-draught vessel is between 2.5 and 3.0 metres (8 ft 2 in and 9 ft 10 in). While officially assigned the highest Finnish-Swedish ice class, the hull is strengthened beyond the minimum requirements for ice class 1A Super.

CCGS Judy LaMarsh has a diesel-electric propulsion system with four twelve-cylinder Caterpillar 3512C high-speed diesel generators rated at 1,790 kilowatts (2,400 hp) each. The vessel is propelled by three 1.6 MW (2,100 hp) Schottel SRP 2020 azimuth thrusters in the stern and two 550 kW (740 hp) pump-jet bow thrusters in the bow. The bollard pull of the vessel is over 50 tonnes-force (490 kN; 49 LTf; 55 STf).

During full-scale icebreaking trials in the Caspian Sea, a sister vessel of CCGS Judy LaMarsh could achieve a speed of 6.5–7 knots (12.0–13.0 km/h; 7.5–8.1 mph) in 45–50-centimetre-thick (18–20 in) level ice and 7.5–8 knots (13.9–14.8 km/h; 8.6–9.2 mph) in 35-centimetre (14 in) ice. The vessel's maximum continuous icebreaking capability is about 90 centimetres (35 in).

== Construction ==
In April 2009, Kazakhstan-based marine service company JSC "Circle Maritime Invest" signed a NOK750 million (about US$112 million) shipbuilding contract with STX Norway Offshore, a subsidiary of STX Europe, for the construction of three icebreaking tugs for its operating subsidiary, Caspian Offshore Construction. A NOK450 million (about US$71.3 million) follow-up order of two additional vessels was signed in August 2010. The Finnish engineering company Aker Arctic, which had been developing the Aker ARC 104 shallow-draught icebreaking tug concept since 2006, was contracted by the shipyard to develop the final technical design.

Mangystau-2, the second vessel of the series, was laid down at STX Brăila shipyard in Romania on 25 June 2010 and delivered on 11 October of the same year, two months after the lead ship. The other three vessels were delivered in 2011.

== Career ==
=== Mangystau-2 (2010–2021) ===
The five Mangystau-class icebreaking tugs were built to support the development, construction and operation of the Kashagan Field in the seasonally-freezing northern Caspian Sea where the water depth can be as low as 3 metres (9.8 ft). In addition to towing and pushing supply barges, the vessels could carry out ice management around the artificial island as well as remain on standby for firefighting, oil spill cleanup operations, and evacuation of up to 300 people in the event of blowout involving hydrogen sulphide.

Originally registered in Aktau and flying the Kazakh flag since 2010, Mangystay-2 was reflagged to Turkmenistan in 2020. In 2021, prior to its transfer to Canada, the vessel was acquired by the Canadian company Atlantic Towing Limited.

=== CCGS Judy LaMarsh (2021–present) ===
In February 2019, the Public Services and Procurement Canada released a request for information (RFI) regarding the acquisition of a commercial icebreaking vessel and converting it to a light icebreaker for the Canadian Coast Guard. A second RFI was released in December 2019, followed by two requests for proposal (RFP) in March 2020 and September 2020. Among other things, the final technical requirements called for a vessel not more than 25 years old (as of 1 April 2020) capable of breaking 60-centimetre (24 in) first-year level ice at a speed of at least 3 knots (5.6 km/h; 3.5 mph).

In November 2021, the Canadian Coast Guard announced that it had acquired Mangystau-2 from Atlantic Towing Limited for C$45,203,547.38 (about US$36.6 million). After leaving the Caspian Sea and sailing across the Atlantic Ocean, the vessel arrived in Canada on 29 December 2021.

In July 2022, the Canadian Coast Guard issued a request for proposal for a one-month dockside refit of Mangystau-2 prior to the vessel's entry to Canadian service. The work awarded to Canadian Maritime Engineering included for example modifications to the vessel's potable water system, removal of all external firefighting equipment, and thorough cleaning of the ventilation ducting.

On 3 October 2022, the Canadian Coast Guard named the new interim light icebreaker CCGS Judy LaMarsh after the Canadian politician, lawyer, author and broadcaster Judy LaMarsh (1924–1980).

In January 2023, CCGS Judy LaMarsh sailed up the Welland Canal and docked in Port Colborne before commencing icebreaking operations.

In January 2024, it was announced that a C$34.3 million contract for further refit, modernization and overhauling of CCGS Judy LaMarsh had been awarded to St. John's-based ship repair company St John's Dockyard Ltd., also known as Newdock. The work had commenced already in December 2023 and was expected to continue until March 2025.

The official ceremony marking CCGS Judy LaMarsh's entry into Canadian Coast Guard service was held on 10 September 2026.
