= Polar Star Expeditions =

Specialty adventure cruise company (2001-2011

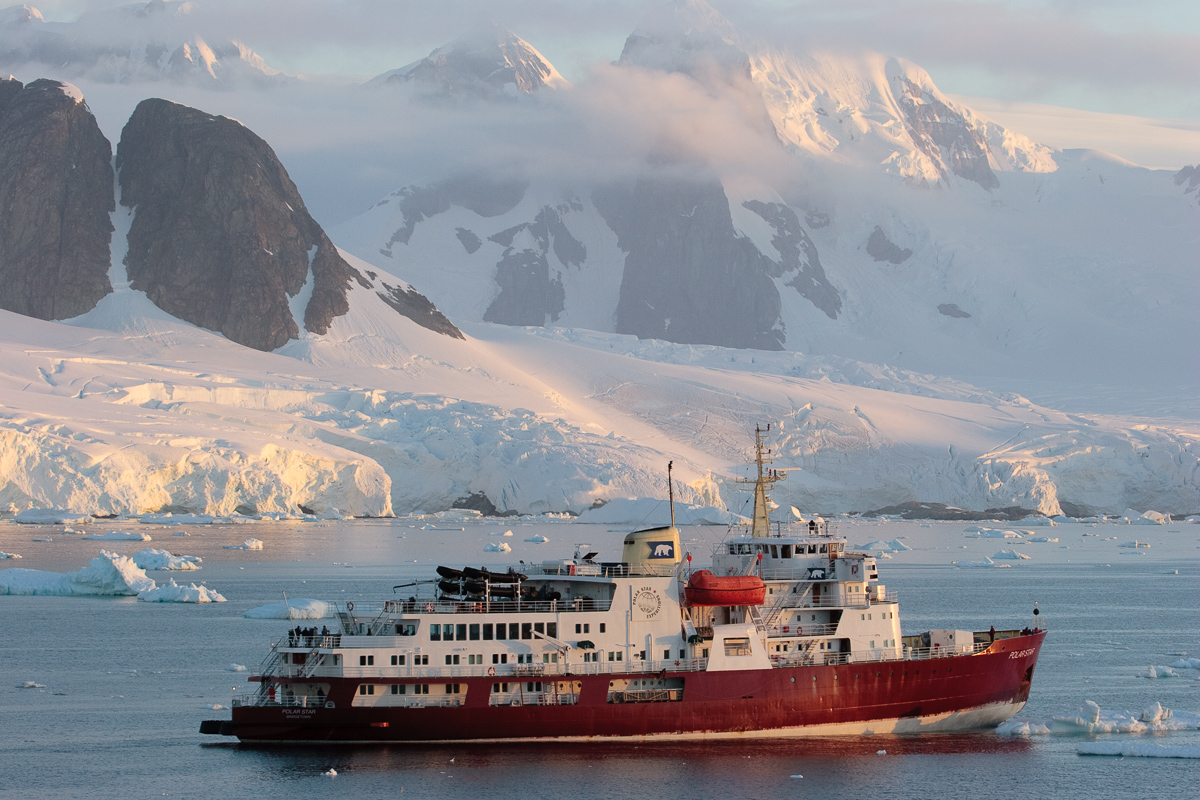
MV Polar Star in the Grandidier Channel, Antarctic Peninsula, in 2006

Polar Star Expeditions was a specialty adventure cruise company owned by Karlsen Shipping Company Ltd. out of Halifax, Nova Scotia, Canada. In 2001, Polar Star began operating a single expedition cruise ship, MV Polar Star, a 87-metre (284 ft) converted Swedish icebreaker with 105 berths. The company conducted cruises mainly in the northern and southern polar and sub-polar regions.

In 2010, its only vessel lost one of its engines and had to operate part of that season on the remaining functional engine. In January 2011, the vessel suffered serious grounding damage in the Antarctic, which led to the failure of the parent company.

== Fleet and operational history ==
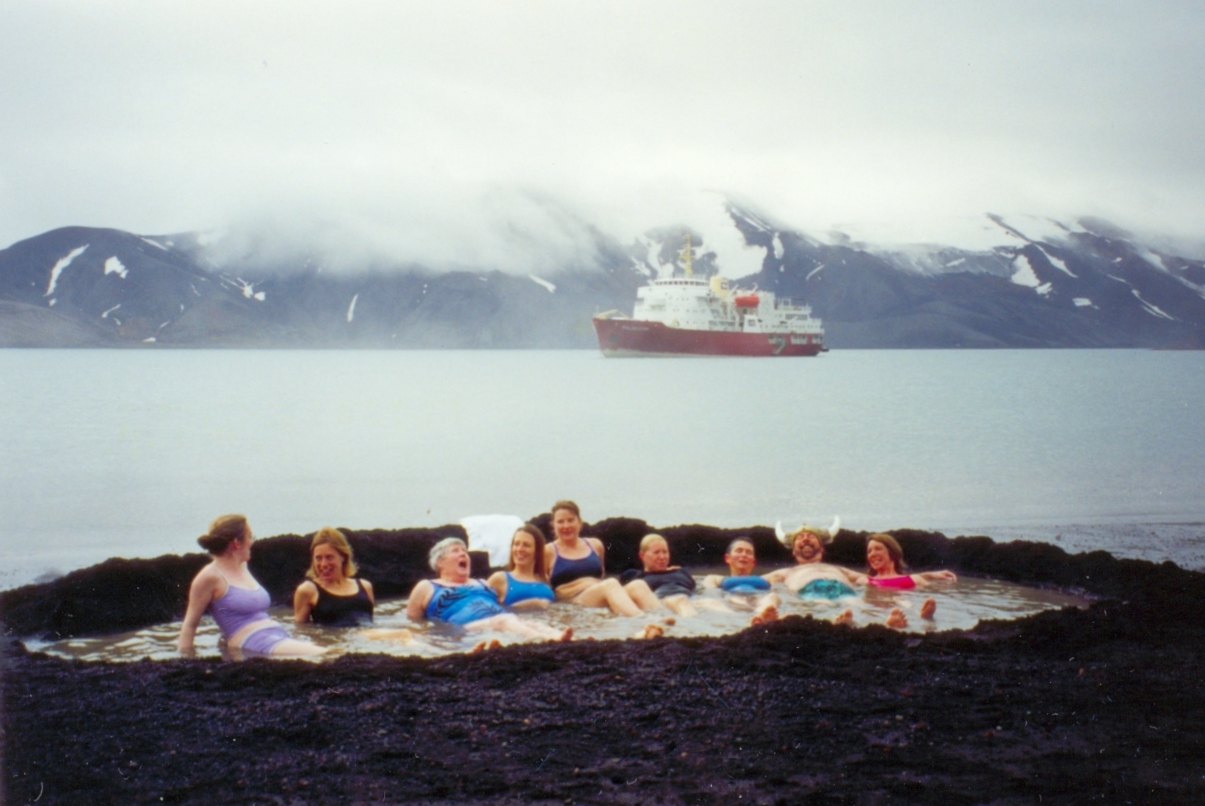
Visitors to Deception Island enjoying thermal pool with Polar Star in background (2006)

MV Polar Star was built at the Wärtsilä Helsinki Shipyard in Finland in 1969 and originally served in the Swedish Maritime Administration's fleet of icebreakers under the name of Njord (IMO 6905745). The vessel is Class Ice 1A, 86.5 metres (283 ft 10 in) long with a 21.2 m (69 ft 7 in) beam, a 6.2 m (20 ft 4 in) draft; and 3,500 gross tonnage (GT); with a cruising speed of 11 knots (20 km/h; 13 mph).

She was sold by the Swedish Government in 2000. The new owner and parent company of Polar Star Expeditions was Karlsen Shipping Co. Ltd., a family business founded in Norway in the 1800s that expanded to Canada in 1940 and became a Canadian-based company. Polar Star was founded to conduct cruises in the northern and southern polar and sub-polar regions. It also chartered with Cheesemans' Ecology Safaris. The vessel was registered in Sweden by Karlsen Sg Norway A/S.

=== Grounding of the Polar Star ===
On January 31, 2011, Polar Star hit an uncharted rock when anchoring just north of Detaille Island in the Antarctic, breaching her outer hull. After assessments, Polar Star, operated by Halifax-based Polar Star Expeditions, received permission from its Barbados flag state and classification society Det Norske Veritas (DNV GL) to depart its location near Detaille Island. The ship sailed to Arctowski Station, a Polish research facility on King George Island in the South Shetland Islands. There, an underwater survey discovered additional damage, and the company decided to transfer passengers to other ships rather than ferry them back to Argentina through the often-rough Drake Passage below Cape Horn. Three ships that were in the vicinity evacuated her 80 passengers and part of her crew on February 3, 2011, but she lost the rest of her 2010/11 Antarctic season, and had to go to Las Palmas in the Canary Islands for repairs. Spanish authorities there later seized the ship against a $1.4 million bill for repairs owed in Las Palmas.

=== Receivership ===
Polar Star Expeditions' parent company Karlsen Shipping Co. Ltd. was forced into receivership in Nova Scotia with eight million dollars in debt when TD Bank called in a $4.6-million loan. This ceased company operations effective May 17, 2011, less than four months after the grounding of Polar Star. Her 27-member crew was left stranded without pay in the Canary Islands in Spain.

=== Fate of ship ===
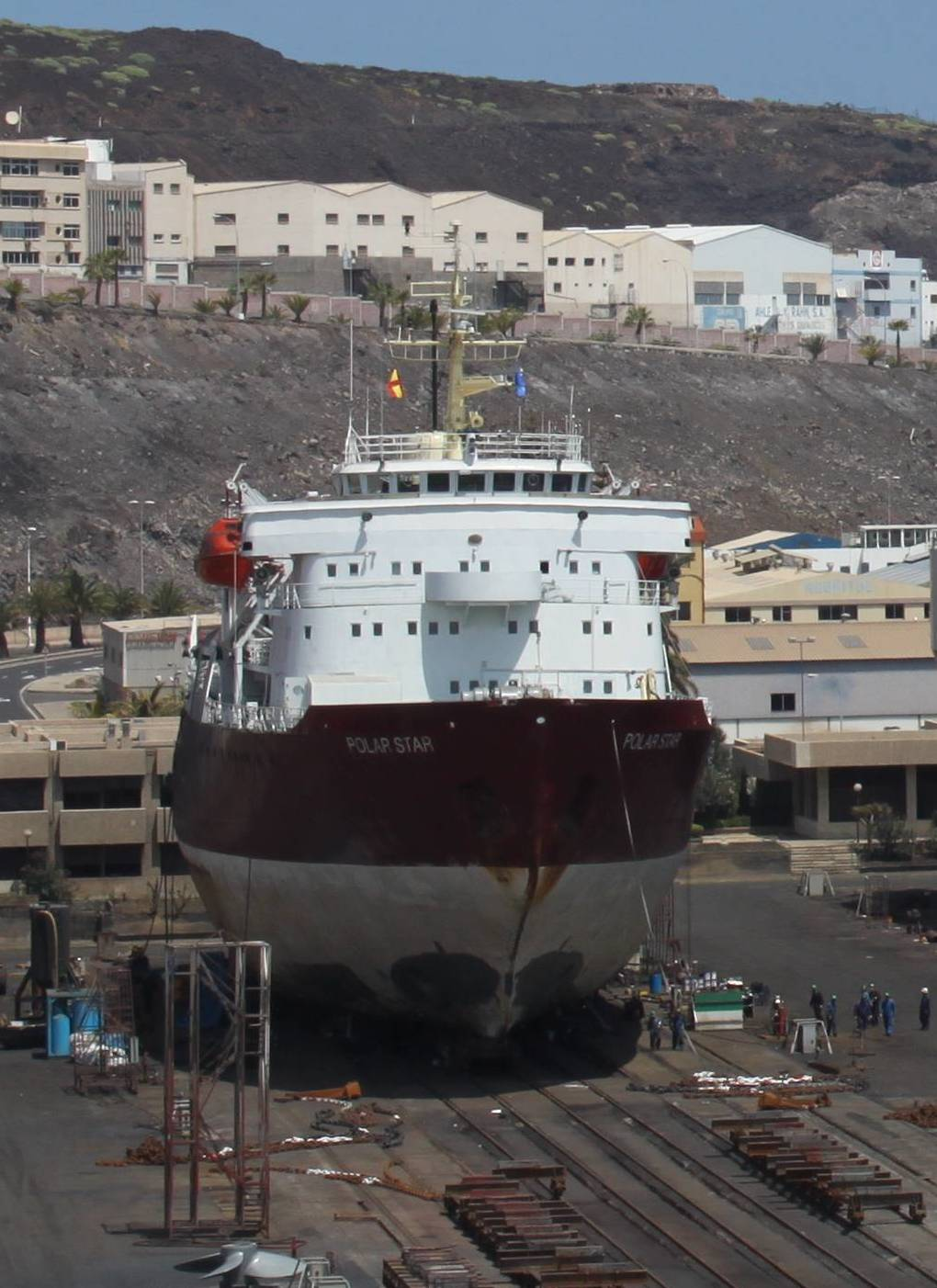
The Polar Star in dry dock, April 2011

The Polar Star was left in drydock at the Astican Shipyard in Las Palmas with unpaid repair bills reaching $1.6 million. The receiver's September 27, 2011 report to the Nova Scotia Supreme Court stated there was little prospect of a significant return to creditors by pursuing a sale of the ship, which had $2.51 million in charges and liens against it by that time. The court-appointed receiver, PricewaterhouseCoopers (PwC), concluded that Polar Star should be abandoned to Astican Shipyard, which was expected to pursue a sale through the Spanish courts. Martin Karlsen objected to abandoning the vessel, which was appraised at $8 million according to the receiver's report and had insurance coverage for the damage repairs. However, any sale by the receiver was complicated by the fact that there was a substantial Spanish lien on the ship, and it would also require costly sea trials before it could be re-certified to sail. Two months later in November 2011, a potential buyer claimed the vessel had deteriorated to the point it could only be sold for scrap. This was disputed by the receiver who noted the vessel was still in dry-dock.

An employee of the international hospital ships charity Mercy Ships was at Astican Yards in the Canary Islands in July 2012. He photographed the MV Polar Star, still up on blocks in drydock, but there were obvious signs of wear and corrosion. There was a substitution of receivers from PricewaterhouseCoopers to Grant Thornton Limited. While the ship had been in dry dock, according to Grant Thornton, the ship broker who originally valued the ship at $8-$10 million in May 2011 valued it at less than half that amount. In October 2012, Grant Thornton applied for a court order approving the sale of the M/V Polar Star to 3264741 Nova Scotia Limited. The purchase price was $200,000. According to Grant Thornton, Astican Shipyard was charging some 34,500 Euros (about US$45,000) a month for dry-dock storage. At some point in the process, it appears 3264741 Nova Scotia Limited assigned its rights to another company called NumberCo.

Polar Star was taken out of drydock by February 2013, and some work was done on the sternwards fifth deck.

As of December 2021, Polar Star was still moored at the shipyard, with her name shortened to Polar S. In December 2022, it was recorded that the ship had been scrapped.
