= Eisvogel (1942 icebreaker) =

Soviet Icebreaker

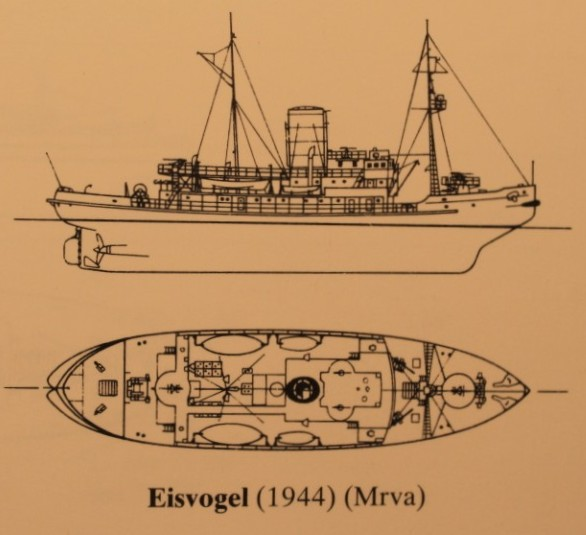
- Eisvogel

History

Nazi Germany
- Name: Eisvogel
- Namesake: German for Kingfisher
- Operator: Kriegsmarine
- Builder: Aalborg Shipyard, Aalborg, Denmark
- Laid down: 1941
- Launched: 1942
- Commissioned: 1942
- In service: 1942–1945
- Fate: Scuttled in Wismar, 1945. Raised and handed over to the Soviet Union as war reparations in 1946

Soviet Union
- Name: Alyosha Popovich (Алёша Попович)
- Namesake: Alyosha Popovich, Russian folk hero
- Operator: Soviet Navy
- Acquired: 1946
- In service: 1946–1972
- Fate: Broken up

General characteristics
- Type: Icebreaker
- Tonnage: 2913 tons
- Length: 61.4 m (201 ft)
- Beam: 15 m (49 ft)
- Draught: 6.3 m (21 ft)
- Speed: 12.5 knots (23 km/h)
- Crew: 69

Eisvogel was an icebreaker in the Kriegsmarine during World War II. After the war, the ship served in the Soviet Union until 1972.

== Ship description ==
The ship was built for the navy in Aalborg Shipyard in Denmark, which has been occupied by Germany since April 1940, as a modified ship of the Eisbär under construction on Eriksbergs Mekaniska Verkstad in Gothenburg, Sweden. It was launched in 1942 and entered service on June 1, 1942. The ship was 61.40 m long and 15.30 m wide, had a draft of 5.90 / 6.30 m and a water displacement of 2090 t (standard) and 2913 t (fully equipped). Two standing triple expansion steam engines with a total of 3200 psi gave a top speed of 12.5 knots over two screws. The armament consisted of two 3.7 cm Flak 37 in single mounts. The crew consisted of 69 men.

== Service history ==
=== Kriegsmarine ===
The Eisvogel served in the Baltic Sea as an icebreaker, tugboat, escort boat and most recently in 1945 during the evacuation of German refugees from East Prussia and Pomerania. At the end of the war, the ship was sunk by its crew after its last arrival with refugees in Wismar.

=== Soviet Union ===
Shortly after the end of the war it was lifted, repaired and delivered to the Soviet Union as spoils of war. Under the new name Alyosha Popovich (Russian Алёша Попович; named after the Russian Bogatyr Aljoscha Popowitsch) it served in the Far East until 1972. The ship was decommissioned in 1972 and laid up in the Novik Bay ("Buchta Novik") on the Russky Island near Vladivostok. There it rusted along with numerous other decommissioned units until it came to the ship cemetery in Truda Bay. In 2003, only the largely rusted outer skin of its hull could be seen there.
