= Robert LeMeur (icebreaker) =

Icebreaker built in 1982

History

Canada
- Name: Robert LeMeur (1982–1997); Robert (1997)
- Namesake: Robert LeMeur
- Owner: Dome Petroleum
- Operator: Canadian Marine Drilling Ltd.
- Port of registry: Edmonton, Alberta
- Ordered: June 1979
- Builder: Burrard Yarrows Corp., North Vancouver
- Yard number: 106
- Laid down: 8 October 1981
- Launched: 26 May 1982
- Completed: 24 September 1982
- In service: 1982–1996
- Fate: Sold to China

China
- Name: Bin Hai 293 (滨海293)
- Owner: China Oilfield Services
- Port of registry: Tianjin
- In service: 1997–2016
- Identification: Call sign: BFKD; IMO number: 8111374; MMSI number: 412300870
- Fate: Sold for scrap

General characteristics
- Type: Icebreaker, platform supply vessel
- Tonnage: 3,285 GT; 1,502 NT; 2,458 DWT
- Displacement: 5,853 tonnes
- Length: 82.8 m (272 ft)
- Beam: 19 m (62 ft) (reamers); 18 m (59 ft) (hull)
- Draught: 5.5 m (18 ft)
- Depth: 7.5 m (25 ft)
- Ice class: CASPPR Arctic Class 3
- Installed power: 2 × MaK 12M453AK (2 × 4,800 hp)
- Propulsion: Two shafts; controllable pitch propellers
- Speed: 13.5 knots (25.0 km/h; 15.5 mph)
- Crew: 14+12

Robert LeMeur was an icebreaking platform supply vessel used to support oil exploration in the Beaufort Sea. Built in 1982 by Burrard Yarrows Corporation in Vancouver, British Columbia, she was part of the fleet of Canadian icebreakers, drillships and support vessels operated by Canadian Marine Drilling (Canmar), the drilling subsidiary of Dome Petroleum and later Amoco Canada Petroleum Company.

In 1997, the vessel was sold to China Oilfield Services and renamed Bin Hai 293. She was used to support offshore oil production in the Bohai Sea until 2016 when the 34-year-old icebreaker was sold for scrapping.

== History ==
=== Development and construction ===
In the mid-1970s, Canadian Marine Drilling (Canmar), the drilling subsidiary of Dome Petroleum, began drilling for oil in the Canadian part of the Beaufort Sea using ice-strengthened drillships and an extensive support fleet of icebreaking vessels. Aiming for year-round operations, the company also began developing its own experimental icebreaker concepts to support exploration drilling and, eventually, production-related operations. The first vessel of this research and development program was the 1979-built Canmar Kigoriak which represented a radical departure from conventional icebreaker designs with, among other features, a single-shaft mechanical propulsion system instead of a more commonly used diesel-electric powertrain.

Following the successful demonstration of Kigoriak's icebreaking capability in the Beaufort Sea, it was agreed to continue the program with the construction of a second vessel. In addition to testing new design features such as an improved hull form and twin-shaft propulsion system, the new icebreaker would be a 4:1 scale model of a proposed 200,000 DWT Arctic tanker intended for transporting oil year-round from the Canadian Arctic to the market.

The construction of new icebreaking supply vessel was awarded to Burrard Yarrows Co. in Vancouver, British Columbia, in June 1979. The keel was laid on 8 October 1981, only about one month after the construction had begun, and the hull was launched on 26 May 1982. The icebreaker was delivered to Canmar on 24 September 1982.

Canmar's new icebreaker was named after Robert LeMeur (1920–1985), a French-born priest-missionary who arrived to Tuktoyaktuk in 1946. He was awarded the Membership of the Order of Canada in 1982 for his efforts to preserve and promote the Inuit culture.

=== Robert LeMeur (1982–1997) ===
Robert LeMeur was designed to support seasonal exploratory drilling operations in the Beaufort Sea. Her typical annual operational profile would begin in May with a warm-up that would gradually bring the vessel systems online after five months of cold lay-up. After commencing break-out, the Canmar icebreakers would first carry out one or more resupply missions to the drilling islands where exploratory activities have continued through the winter. In June, the icebreakers would return to the winter base to escort the drillships to predetermined drilling locations. Once the spread-mooring system had been deployed and drilling commenced, the icebreakers would remain on site to carry out ice management by breaking up large floes that could threaten the drilling operation. Once all ice had melted, Robert LeMeur would continue with supply missions to different Beaufort Sea drilling operations.

In the autumn, the Canmar icebreakers would return to continue ice management around the drillships until ice would become too thick for the mooring systems. By the end of November, the drillships would be escorted back for winter lay-up and Robert LeMeur would carry out final supply runs to the drilling islands. Although the vessel would typically be laid up for winter in mid-December, she was capable of continuing supply operations through the winter. In some years, Robert LeMeur was involved in research and development projects during the winter months or drydocked on Canmar's floating dock for inspection and repairs.

In 1982–1989, the Canmar drillships drilled only 10 wells for Dome Petroleum and other oil companies in the Canadian part of the Beaufort Sea. In addition, four more wells were drilled by the drillships in the Alaskan waters in 1985–1991. Other wells were drilled from artificial drilling islands as well as novel drilling systems such as Kulluk and the single steel drilling caisson. While a number of oil and gas discoveries were made, none of the findings were sufficient to warrant commercial production. Following the falling oil prices in the 1980s and the Exxon Valdez oil spill in 1989, hydrocarbon exploration in the Beaufort Sea and the MacKenzie Delta gradually ended. Robert LeMeur was reportedly laid up in 1996.

The experience gained from Robert LeMeur and the other Canmar icebreakers was used in the design of the 1988-built Swedish icebreaker Oden which incorporates some design aspects of the Canadian icebreakers' hull form, propulsion and auxiliary systems used to reduce ice resistance.

=== Bin Hai 293 (1997–2016) ===
In 1997, Amoco sold Canmar's former fleet of drilling units and offshore icebreakers to an international consortium of shipping companies. After having been reflagged to Liberia and renamed Robert for a short period of time, the former Robert LeMeur was acquired by a subsidiary of the state-owned China National Offshore Oil Corporation and renamed Bin Hai 293. (Note: 滨海293, meaning "Coastal 293".) She became part of a large fleet of vessels distinguished only by number and was used to support Chinese offshore platforms in the seasonally frozen Bohai Sea.

Bin Hai 293 was sold for breaking in late 2016. At the time, the vessel originally built for the Canadian Arctic had spent more than half of her 34-year-long career in the Bohai Sea under the Chinese flag. The decision to scrap the old icebreaker was likely related to the large fleet renewal program, which included ice-strengthened tonnage, carried out by China Oilfield Services.

Despite having been sold for demolition already in 2016, the AIS transponder of Bin Hai 293 was still active in March 2017, showing the vessel moored at Tianjin.

== Design ==
=== General characteristics ===
The main dimensions of Robert LeMeur were dictated by the various design constrains. The length overall, 82.8 metres (272 ft), was the maximum that would still allow the vessel to come alongside spread-moored drillships. The beam, 19 metres (62 ft) at reamers and 18 metres (59 ft) amidships, was governed by the propulsion machinery that was ordered early in the design process. While the initial requirements called for an operating draught of 4.1 metres (13 ft), the icebreaking draught was later increased to 5.5 metres (18 ft) when the ice class of the vessel was upgraded from CASPPR (Note: Canadian Arctic Shipping Pollution Prevention Regulations) Class 2 to Class 3. In addition, since it was decided not to dredge the Tuktoyaktuk harbour to a greater depth, Robert LeMeur was also designed to carry as cargo as possible at a lower draught of 4.1 metres (13 ft). The displacement of the vessel at design waterline was 5,853 tonnes, corresponding to a deadweight of 2,690 tonnes.

Robert LeMeur had a spoon-shaped icebreaking bow designed to minimize ice resistance, a further development of Canmar Kigoriak's hull form. The bow was also fitted with reamers that made it about 0.5 metres (20 in) wider than the vertical-sided midbody, breaking a wider channel that would help with turning in difficult ice conditions. The deckhouse was mounted forward of a 700 m^{2} (7,500 sq ft) open cargo deck and nine bulk cargo silos. The superstructure design was chosen to minimize vibrations and maximize visibility from the one-man primary conning position. She had accommodation for 14 crew members and 12 supernumeraries. Under the main deck, Robert LeMeur had a full-length double hull as per Canmar policy.

=== Power and propulsion ===
Robert LeMeur had a diesel-mechanical propulsion system with two diesel engines driving 3-metre (9.8 ft) controllable pitch propellers in nozzles. The main engines were supercharged 12-cylinder MaK 12M453 medium-speed diesel engines rated at 4,800 hp (3,600 kW) each. The engines were fitted with oversized flywheels to increase the inertia of the propulsion system against ice impact. The shaftlines were placed so close to each other that the nozzles in the stern were actually joined. Onboard electricity was generated by four Caterpillar D399 auxiliary generating sets. For maneuvering, Robert Lemeur had twin rudders with a maximum turning angle of 45 degrees and two transverse bow thrusters.

For icebreaking operations, Robert LeMeur had an extensive outfit of various "ice management systems" designed to reduce friction between ice and the hull of the vessel. A powerful hull wash system could be used to wet the snow on ice ahead of the vessel by spraying water through eighteen openings on the hull, reducing the ice resistance by 20 to 30 percent based on ice trials in various ice conditions. A secondary system could be used to pump water below the waterline between hull and ice floes. Two air bubbler systems were fitted: one in the bow to lubricate the hull and another in the stern to prevent ice from entering the nozzles. The hull was coated with an abrasion-resistant low-friction epoxy paint. Finally, a heeling system capable of rocking the vessel back and forth could be used to prevent the vessel from getting stuck and assist in turning.

In 0.9-metre (3.0 ft) ice, Robert LeMeur could achieve a speed of 7 knots (13 km/h; 8.1 mph). The maximum icebreaking capability was predicted to be about 1.5 metres (4.9 ft). In open water, the vessel could reach a speed of 13.5 knots (25.0 km/h; 15.5 mph). The bollard pull of the icebreaker was 103 tons.

== See also ==
History of the petroleum industry in Canada (frontier exploration and development)
