= Teshio (PM 15) =

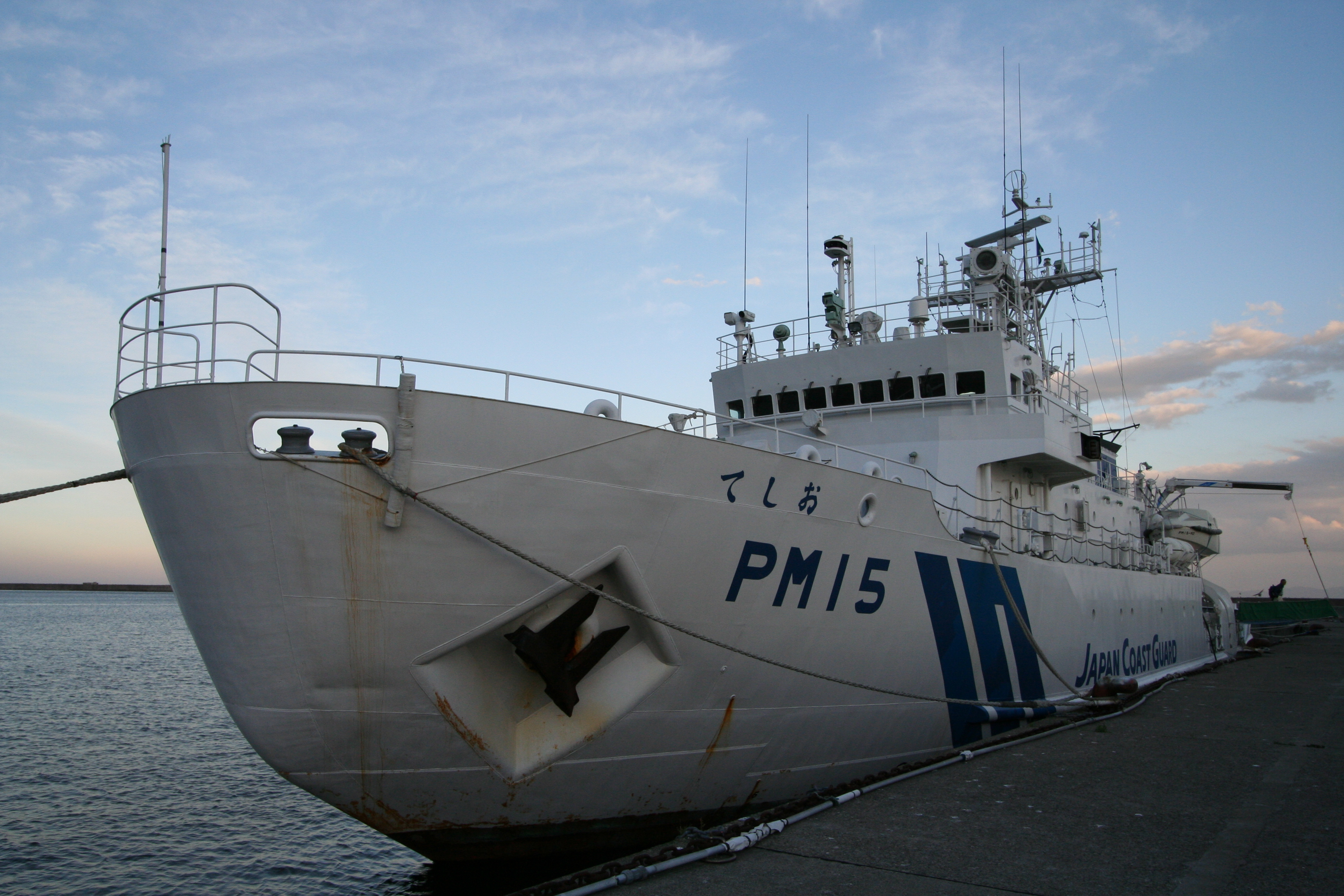
- Teshio alongside in its homeport Rausu, Hokkaido

History

Japan
- Name: Teshio (てしお)
- Operator: Japan Coast Guard
- Ordered: August 1994
- Builder: Nippon Kōkan K. K. Tsurumi Shipyard (Yokohama, Japan)
- Yard number: 1062
- Laid down: 7 October 1994
- Launched: 20 April 1995
- Completed: 19 October 1995
- In service: 1995–present
- Home port: Rausu, Hokkaido
- Identification: IMO number: 9112404; MMSI number: 431800056; Call sign: JGVJ; Pennant number: PM 15
- Status: In service

General characteristics
- Type: Patrol vessel
- Length: 54.88 m (180.1 ft)
- Beam: 10.20 m (33.5 ft)
- Installed power: 2 × Niigata 6MG25HX (2 × 1,800 hp)
- Propulsion: Two controllable pitch propellers
- Speed: 14.5 kn (26.9 km/h; 16.7 mph)

Teshio (Japanese: てしお) is an icebreaking patrol vessel operated by the Japan Coast Guard. The vessel is homeported in Rausu and operates in the seasonally-freezing waters around Hokkaido.

== Description ==
Teshio is 54.88 metres (180.1 ft) long overall and has a beam of 10.20 metres (33.5 ft).

Teshio is powered by two six-cylinder Niigata 6MG25HX medium-speed diesel engines with a maximum continuous rating of 1,800 horsepower (1,300 kW) and continuous service rating of 1,530 horsepower (1,140 kW) each. The engines are coupled to two controllable pitch propellers giving the vessel a service speed of 14.5 knots (26.9 km/h; 16.7 mph).

== Construction and career ==
Teshio was built by Nippon Kōkan K. K. Tsurumi Shipyard in Yokohama. The ship was laid down on 7 October 1994, launched on 20 April 1995, and completed on 19 October 1995.
