= CGS Minto =

Canadian icebreaker vessel

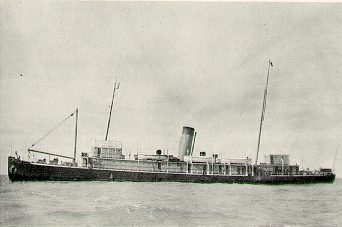
- Minto in Canadian service

History

Canada
- Name: Minto
- Namesake: Gilbert Elliot-Murray-Kynynmound, 4th Earl of Minto
- Builder: Gourlay Brothers, Dundee
- Launched: 12 July 1899
- Completed: September 1899
- In service: 1899
- Out of service: November 1915
- Fate: Sold to Russian Empire, 1915

Russian Empire / Soviet Union
- Name: Ivan Susanin (1915–1920); Leitenant Dreyer (1920–1921); Skuratov (1921–1922)
- Acquired: 1915
- In service: 1915
- Out of service: 1922
- Fate: Wrecked 1922

General characteristics
- Type: Icebreaker
- Tonnage: 1,089 GRT
- Length: 225 ft (69 m)
- Beam: 32.5 ft (9.9 m)
- Draught: 20.5 ft (6.2 m)
- Propulsion: 1 × screw, Steam triple-expansion engine, 2,900 ihp (2,163 kW)
- Speed: 16 knots (30 km/h)

CGS Minto was one of the Government of Canada's early icebreakers. She was modeled after CGS Stanley. Her winter duties included clearing ice between Prince Edward Island and the mainland. The ship was launched in 1899 and remained on the East Coast of Canada until 1915, when Minto was sold to the Russian Empire. Transferred in November, she became Ivan Susanin, and was tasked with keeping northern Russian ports free of ice. Her name was changed to Leitenant Dreyer in 1920 after being taken over by the Soviet Navy and Skuratov in 1921. The ship was wrecked in the Barents Sea in 1922.

== Description ==
Minto's design was based on CGS Stanley, Canada's previously constructed icebreaker. Minto was larger and had no bowsprit and a rounded bow. Minto was intended to augment Stanley in servicing Prince Edward Island. The ship had a gross register tonnage (GRT) of 1,089 tons and was 225 feet (68.6 m) long overall with a beam of 32.5 feet (9.9 m) and a draught of 20.5 feet (6.2 m).

The ship was powered by steam from a triple-expansion engine driving a single screw. This created 2,900 indicated horsepower (2,163 kW) and gave the vessel a maximum speed of 16 knots (30 km/h).

== Service history ==
The ship was ordered from Gourlay Brothers and constructed in Dundee, Scotland. The vessel was launched on 12 July 1899, named for the Governor General of Canada, Gilbert Elliot-Murray-Kynynmound, 4th Earl of Minto. The vessel was completed in September 1899.

Like Stanley, Minto was used as a lighthouse and buoy supply vessel from spring to fall and in winter, was used for icebreaking and passenger ferry service to and from Prince Edward Island. In 1905, the ice became too thick for either ship to traverse and the ferry service was suspended, with travel to island done by iceboat. In 1911, 1912 and 1915, Minto was sent to Hudson Bay for survey work.

During the First World War, the Russian Empire required icebreakers to keep northern ports open for cargo traffic. In 1915 Canada sold the vessel to Imperial Russia, with Minto departing in November for Arkhangelsk. Upon arrival, the ship was renamed Ivan Susanin (Иван Сусанин) and was deployed in the White Sea, breaking Russian and British ships out of the ice. In 1920, after the fall of the Russian Empire, the ship was taken over by the Soviet Navy and renamed Leitenant Dreyer (Лейтенант Дрейер). In 1921 the vessel was renamed again, this time to Skuratov (Скуратов). (Note: Russian ship names: (1) after Ivan Susanin, distinguish from Russian patrol ship Ivan Susanin, (2) after Nikolay von Dreyer, (3) after Arctic navigator Aleksey Skuratov) In 1922 Skuratov foundered at Cheshskaya Guba (Chyoshskaya Guba), southeast Barents Sea. (Note: Russian sources give a slightly different place of wreckage: Gornostalya Guba, 4 miles off coast by Cape Svyatoy Nos (67.925444°N 48.561178°E).)
