= CCGS Saurel =

Canadian Coast Guard icebreaker

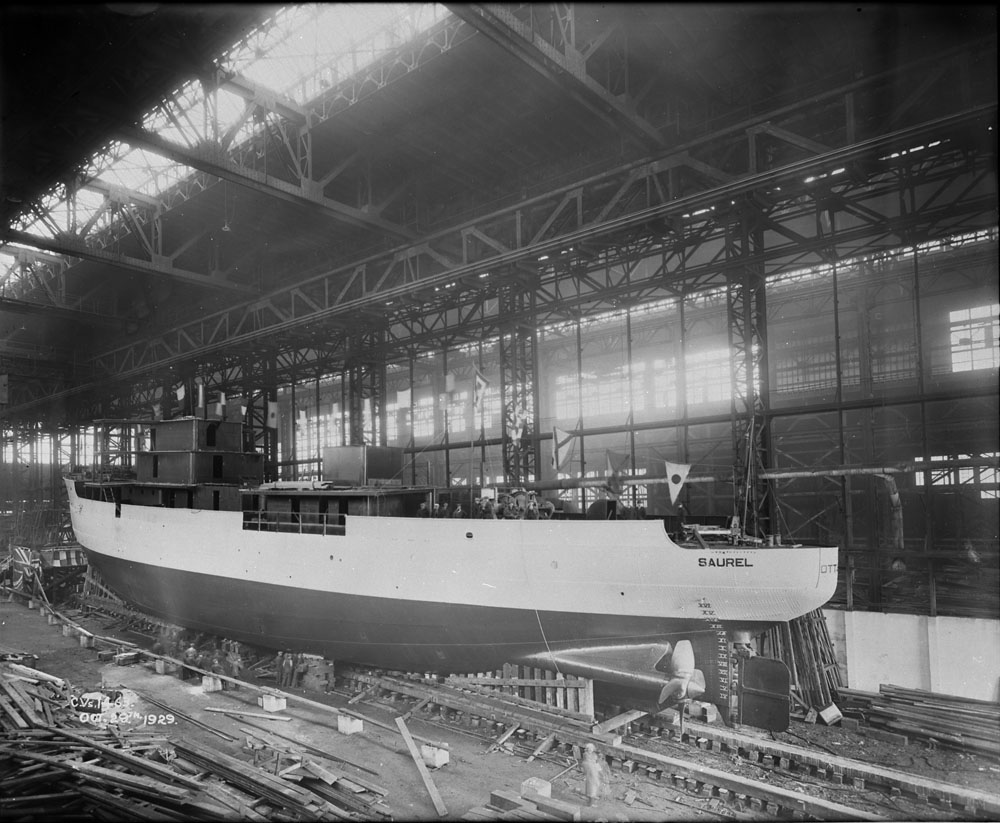
- Saurel under construction in 1929

History

Canada
- Name: Saurel
- Operator: Department of Marine, Marine Service section; Canadian Coast Guard
- Builder: Canadian Vickers, Montreal
- Commissioned: 1929
- Decommissioned: 1967
- In service: 1929–1967
- Stricken: 1967
- Fate: Scrapped 1968

General characteristics
- Type: Icebreaker
- Tonnage: 1,252 GRT
- Length: 200 ft (61 m)
- Beam: 42 ft (13 m)
- Draught: 19.3 ft (5.9 m)
- Propulsion: 2 × triple expansion steam engines; 3,600 ihp (2,700 kW)

CCGS Saurel was a Canadian Coast Guard icebreaker. She was the first Canadian icebreaker to be built in Canada. She was designated Saint John Shipbuilding hull number 6, but work was subcontracted to Canadian Vickers as hull number 110. Upon completion in December 1929, Saurel attempted to prevent flood damage by breaking up ice jams on Lake Saint Pierre. As larger and heavier icebreakers later proved more effective on the Saint Lawrence River, Saurel assisted winter shipping in the Gulf of St. Lawrence until retired in 1967.
