= Brăila shipyard =

Shipyard in Romania

Coordinates: 45°14′48″N 27°57′41″E

Vard Shipyards Romania - Brăila

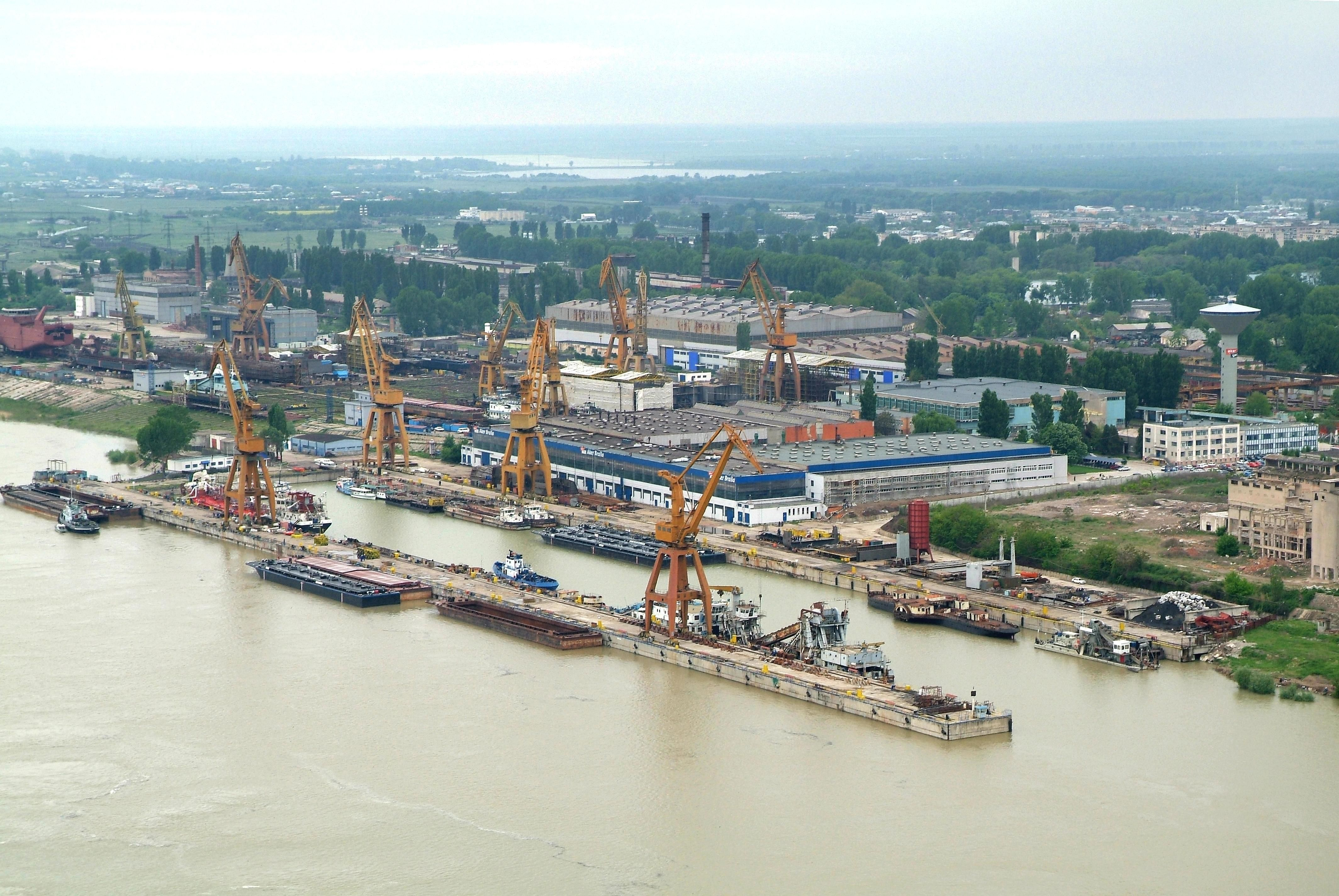
- View of the shipyard, 2005
- Industry: Shipbuilding, ship repair and conversion
- Founded: 8 May 1940; 86 years ago
- Headquarters: Brăila, Romania
- Products: Commercial ships, riverboats, military ships
- Parent: VARD
- Website: www.vard.com/location/romania/vard-braila

Shipyards of Romania

The Brăila shipyard (Romanian: Șantierul Naval Brăila), formally Vard Shipyards Romania - Brăila, is a shipyard located in the town of Brăila, on the lower Danube. It specializes in hull manufacturing and partial outfitting. The shipyard was founded on 8 May 1940 as Șantierul Naval România with the role of building and repairing riverboats and ships.

== History ==
The shipyard was established on 8 May 1940 on the location of the former pulp mill after acquiring the "M. S. Mihăilescu" workshops. The yard had an administrative building, several reinforced concrete workshops and a drawing room. A total of 67 workers were employed initially. Through various contracts with the Romanian government, until 1941, the shipyard constructed 65 wooden boats, 2 diver boats, and 785 anti-aircraft machine gun tripods. It also refurbished barges into barracks barges and tankers, and conducted repairs on ferries, tankers, tugboats and barges for the Romanian Navy.

One of the shipyard's main products until 1950 were wooden coasters of 300 to 550 DWT. In 1949, the shipyard completed the construction of its first 1000-ton river tanker. In 1955, the shipyard was renamed to the "1 Mai" shipyard. Its production was diversified, building at total of 275 various ships around this time. Ships were also exported to Syria, Egypt and the USSR. Merged with the "Viitorul" shipyard in 1961, the Brăila shipyard continued expanding, exporting its first 4500 DWT cargo ship to Bulgaria in 1972. By 1980, the shipyard constructed seven ocean-going fishing trawlers, the first vessels of this kind to be constructed in Romania. At this time, the shipyard employed 5200 workers.

In 1990, the shipyard was renamed to Șantierul Naval Brăila SA. Acquired by Aker Yards in 2003, the yard became the Aker Yards Brăila SA. It was later changed to STX RO Offshore Brăila after Aker Yards was purchased by the South Korean STX Offshore & Shipbuilding in 2008. Over €25 million were invested in the shipyard which saw the construction of new halls and modernization the slipway. New production lines equipped with plasma cutting machines, modern welding machines, as well as a sandblasting and painting station were constructed.

Following the purchase of STX Europe by Fincantieri in 2013, the shipyard was named Vard Shipyards Romania - Brăila. Since then, Vard Brăila underwent another program which included the installation of new cranes, and the construction of new mobile halls. The launch infrastructure was also modernized to accommodate bigger vessels, increasing its capacity to 6,000 ton vessels.

Between 2019 and 2022, the Brăila shipyard delivered the blocks which formed the deck of the Brăila Bridge. Between 2023 and 2024, four of the five Offshore wind farm maintenance vessels ordered by the Norwegian company Norwind Offshore were built at Brăila, with outfitting done by Vard Brattvåg. In 2026, Vard Brăila layed the keel for the RV6000 research vessel ordered by the US-based research organization Inkfish.

== Gallery ==
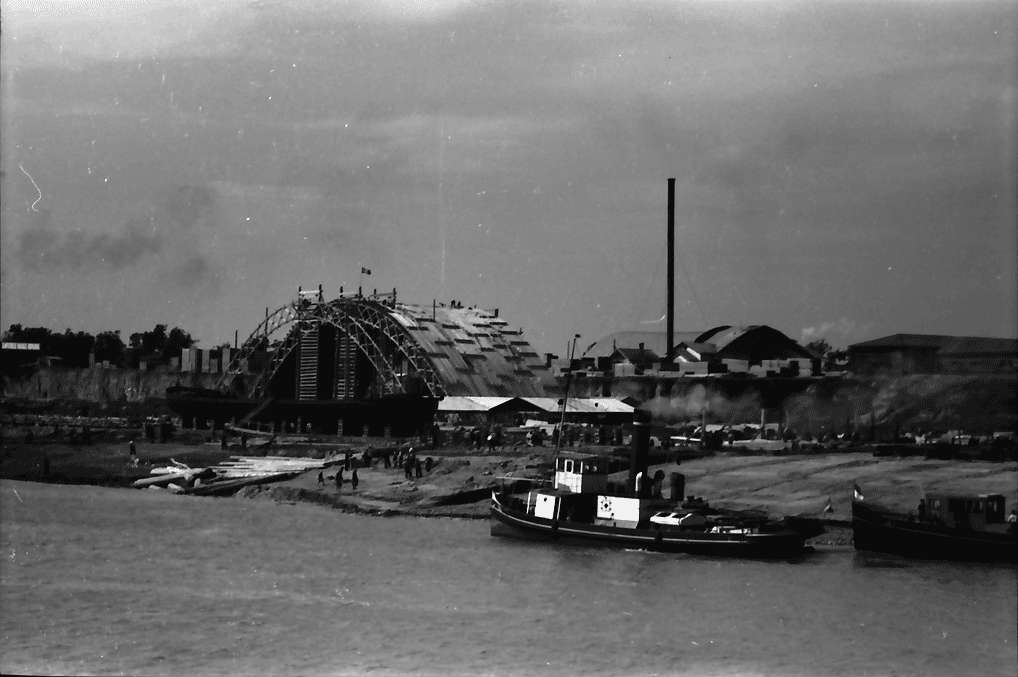
The shipyard in 1943

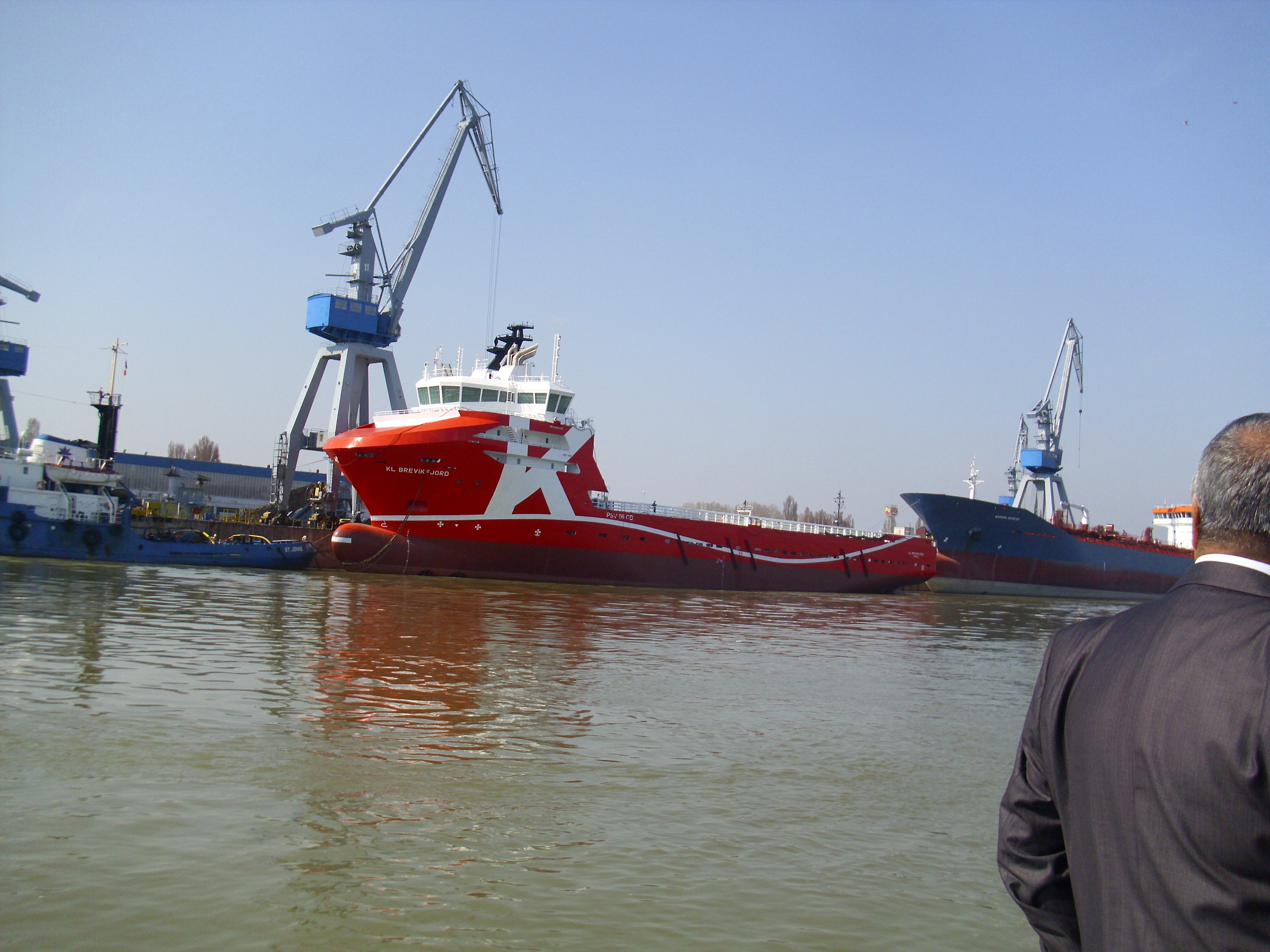
Offshore supply vessel KL Brevikfjord constructed at STX Brăila in 2010

== See also ==
- Tulcea shipyard (Vard Shipyards Romania - Tulcea)

== Bibliography ==
- Munteanu, Ioan (2013). Portul Brăila - Mărire și decădere - (PDF) (in Romanian). Editura Proilavia.
