= MV Tulpar =

History

Kazakhstan
- Name: Tulpar
- Owner: Roosalka Shipping Ltd.
- Operator: BUE Kazakhstan Limited
- Port of registry: Aktau, Kazakhstan
- Builder: Ulstein Verft AS
- Yard number: 268
- Laid down: January 31, 2002
- Launched: April 13, 2002
- Completed: September 18, 2002
- Identification: IMO number: 9263083; MMSI number: 436000017; Callsign: UNQ
- Status: In service

General characteristics
- Type: Icebreaker, tow ship, supply vessel
- Tonnage: 3,343 GT
- Displacement: 4,000 t (3,900 long tons)
- Length: 94.08 m (308.7 ft) LOA
- Draught: 4.0 m (13.1 ft)
- Depth: 5.0 m (16.4 ft)
- Decks: 5
- Ice class: 0.6m
- Propulsion: 3 x W12V200 diesel engine
- Speed: 13 knots (24 km/h; 15 mph)
- Crew: 20

MV Tulpar is a Kazakh ice-breaking and supply ship that was built in 2002 by Norwegian shipbuilder Ulstein Verft. It is based at Aktau and was originally registered to the Cayman Islands but soon moved to Kazakhstan.
