= Foros (icebreaker) =

Latvian icebreaking salvage tug

History

Latvia
- Name: Foros
- Owner: Rigas Brīvostas Flote SIA
- Port of registry: Giurgiulești, Moldova
- Builder: Oy Wärtsilä Ab Helsinki Shipyard, Finland
- Yard number: 460
- Launched: 29 April 1983
- Identification: IMO number: 8119089; MMSI number: 214182217; Call sign: ERVQ
- Status: In service

General characteristics
- Type: Salvage tug
- Tonnage: 3,122 GT
- Displacement: 934
- Length: 71.6 m (235 ft)
- Draught: 7.12 m (23 ft)
- Depth: 9 m (30 ft)
- Installed power: 5152 kW / 7000 HP DVS 64 H 40/46 OM 4
- Speed: 15

Foros (formerly named Fobos from 1983 to 2014) is a Latvian icebreaking salvage tug. She was built at Wärtsilä Helsinki Shipyard, Finland, and delivered in 1983.
