= Georgiy Sedov (icebreaker) =

Three icebreakers have been named Georgiy Sedov:

- Georgiy Sedov (1908 icebreaker), a steam-powered icebreaking vessel launched in 1908, acquired by the Soviet Union in 1915 and scrapped in 1967
- Georgiy Sedov (1967 icebreaker), a Dobrynya Nikitich-class variant built for the Soviet Navy in 1967 and decommissioned in 1992
- Georgiy Sedov (1998 icebreaker), an icebreaking supply vessel built in 1998 as Antarcticaborg and acquired by Russia in 2019
