= Pyotr Pakhtusov (icebreaker) =

History

→ Soviet Union → Russia
- Name: Ledokol-10 (Ледокол-10) (1966); Pyotr Pakhtusov (Пётр Пахтусов) (1966–1971); Mendeleev (Менделеев) (1971–1975); Pyotr Pakhtusov (Пётр Пахтусов) (1975–1997); Prabhavi (1997)
- Namesake: Pyotr Pakhtusov; Dmitri Mendeleev
- Owner: Hydrographic Service of the USSR (1966–1992); Port of Arkhangelsk (1992–1995); JSC "Stalker" (1995–1997); Diampro Trading
- Port of registry: Arkhangelsk, Soviet Union (1966–1992); Arkhangelsk, Russia (1992–1997); Kingstown, Saint Vincent and the Grenadines (1997)
- Builder: Admiralty Shipyard (Leningrad, USSR)
- Yard number: 774
- Laid down: 21 May 1966
- Launched: 8 August 1966
- Completed: 30 December 1966
- Decommissioned: 1997
- In service: 1966–1997
- Identification: IMO number: 6614358
- Fate: Broken up

General characteristics
- Class & type: Dobrynya Nikitich-class icebreaker and hydrographic survey vessel
- Displacement: 3,350 t (3,300 long tons)
- Length: 67.7 m (222 ft)
- Beam: 18.1 m (59 ft)
- Draught: 6.3 m (20.7 ft)
- Depth: 8.3 m (27.2 ft)
- Installed power: 3 × 13D100 (3 × 1,800 hp)
- Propulsion: Diesel-electric; three shafts (2 × 2,400 hp + 1,600 hp)
- Speed: 15 knots (28 km/h; 17 mph)
- Range: 6,700 nautical miles (12,400 km; 7,700 mi) at 13 knots (24 km/h; 15 mph)
- Endurance: 17 days
- Complement: 42

Pyotr Pakhtusov (Russian: Пётр Пахтусов) was a Soviet and later Russian icebreaker and hydrographic survey vessel in service from 1966 until 1997.

== Description ==
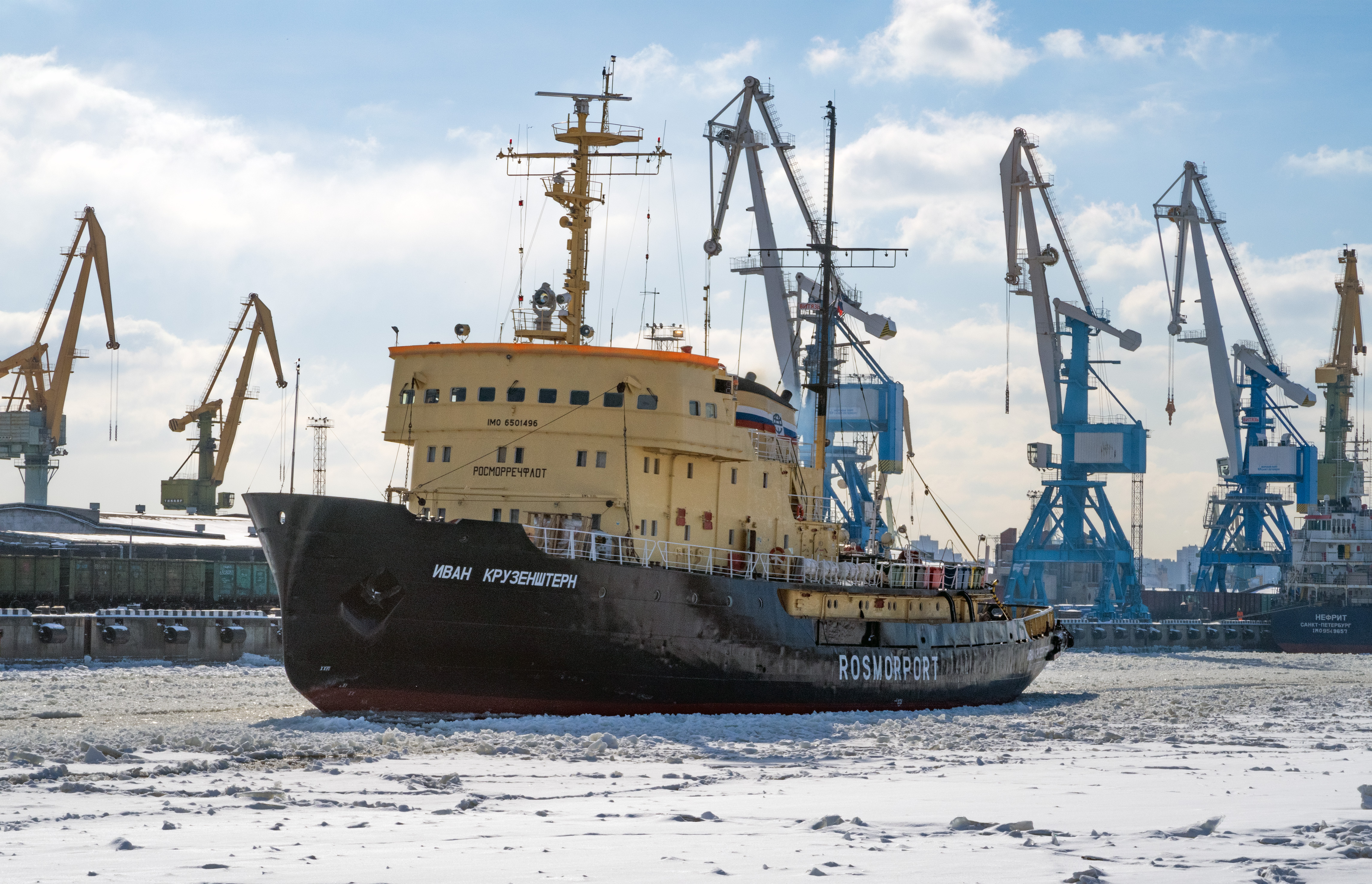
Ivan Kruzenstern, a similar Project 97A icebreaker

In the mid-1950s, the Soviet Union began developing a new diesel-electric icebreaker design based on the 1942-built steam-powered icebreaker Eisbär to meet the needs of both civilian and naval operators. Built in various configurations until the early 1980s, the Project 97 icebreakers and their derivatives became the largest and longest-running class of icebreakers and icebreaking vessels built in the world. Of the 32 ships built in total, two Project 97D icebreakers were built with additional facilities for hydrographic surveys.

Project 97D icebreakers were 67.7 metres (222 ft) long overall and had a beam of 18.1 metres (59 ft). Fully laden, the vessels drew 6.3 metres (20.7 ft) of water and had a displacement of 3,350 tonnes (3,300 long tons). Their three 1,800-horsepower (1,300 kW) 10-cylinder 13D100 two-stroke opposed-piston diesel engines were coupled to generators that powered electric propulsion motors driving two propellers in the stern and a third one in the bow. Pyotr Pakhtusov also featured an experimental bow washing system to increase the icebreaking capability of the vessel.

Compared to baseline Project 97 icebreakers, the vessels fitted for hydrographic surveys featured additional scientific facilities, echosounders to conduct hydrographic survey, and accommodation for an additional 14 personnel.

== History ==
The first of two Project 97D icebreakers was laid down at Admiralty Shipyard in Leningrad on 21 May 1966, launched on 8 August 1966, and delivered on 30 December 1966. Launched as Ledokol-10 (Russian: Ледокол-10), Russian for "icebreaker", the vessel was renamed after the Russian 19th century surveyor and Arctic explorer Pyotr Kuzmich Pakhtusov (1800–1835) before commissioning. The vessel entered service with the Hydrographic Service of the USSR and was registered in Arkhangelsk. However, the vessel spent its first winter breaking ice in the Baltic Sea.

In 1971, Pyotr Pakhtusov was renamed Mendeleev (Russian: Менделеев) after the Russian chemist and inventor Dmitri Ivanovich Mendeleev (1834–1907), but reverted to its previous name in 1975.

Following the dissolution of the Soviet Union, Pyotr Pakhtusov passed over to the successor state, Russia. The ownership of the vessel was transferred to the Port of Arkhangelsk in 1992 and to a private company, JSC "Stalker", in 1995.

In 1997, Pyotr Pakhtusov was renamed Prabhavi and reflagged to Saint Vincent and the Grenadines for its final voyage to Alang, India, for scrapping.
