= Russian ship Peresvet =

Several ships of the Imperial Russian, Soviet and Russian Navies have been named Peresvet after Alexander Peresvet.

- Russian frigate Peresvet (ru) - 51-gun steam frigate launched in 1860 and stricken in 1874.
- Russian battleship Peresvet - Lead ship of the Peresvet-class predreadnoughts
- Peresvet (1939 icebreaker)
- Peresvet (icebreaker) - Dobrynya Nikitich-class icebreaker launched in 1969 and scrapped after 2011.
- Russian landing ship Peresvet - Ropucha-class landing ship launched in 1991 as BDK-11 and renamed Peresvet in 2006.
