= Dobrynya Nikitich (disambiguation) =

Dobrynya Nikitich is a bogatyr (epic knight) in Russian folklore.

Dobrynya Nikitich may also refer to:

- Dobrynya Nikitich-class icebreaker, a class of Russian ships
  - Dobrynya Nikitich (icebreaker), lead ship of class
- Dobrynya Nikitich (opera), a 1901 opera by Aleksandr Grechaninov
- Dobrynya Nikitich i Zmey Gorynych, a 2006 Russian animated film
