= Purga (1960 icebreaker) =

Soviet and Russian naval ship

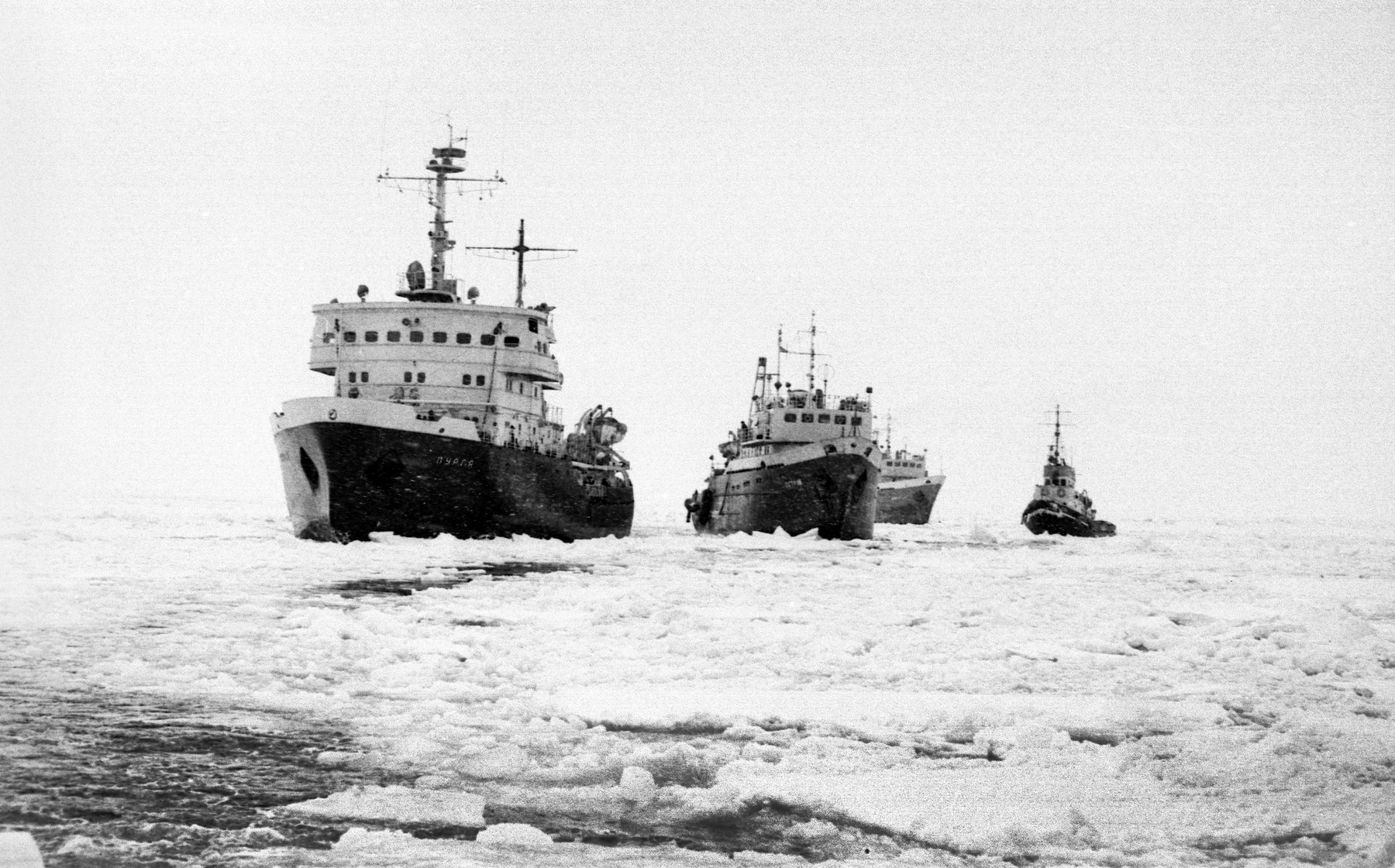
- Icebreaker Purga (left) escorting other ships in ice in 1970

History

→ Soviet Union → Russia
- Name: Purga (Пурга)
- Namesake: Russian for "blizzard"
- Operator: Baltic Fleet
- Ordered: 18 May 1957
- Builder: Admiralty Shipyard (Leningrad, USSR)
- Yard number: 761
- Laid down: 31 May 1960
- Launched: 10 December 1960
- Completed: 23 October 1961
- Decommissioned: 1 June 2012
- In service: 1961–2012
- Fate: Broken up in 2018

General characteristics
- Class & type: Dobrynya Nikitich-class icebreaker
- Displacement: 2,935 t (2,889 long tons)
- Length: 67.7 m (222 ft)
- Beam: 18 m (59 ft)
- Draught: 5.35 m (17.6 ft)
- Depth: 8.3 m (27.2 ft)
- Installed power: 3 × 13D100 (3 × 1,800 hp)
- Propulsion: Diesel-electric; three shafts (2 × 2,400 hp + 1,600 hp)
- Speed: 15 knots (28 km/h; 17 mph)
- Range: 5,700 nautical miles (10,600 km; 6,600 mi) at 13 knots (24 km/h; 15 mph)
- Endurance: 17 days
- Complement: 42
- Armament: 1 × twin 57 mm AK-257; 1 × twin 25 mm 2M-3M
- Notes: Later disarmed

Purga (Russian: Пурга, lit. 'blizzard') was a Soviet and later Russian Navy icebreaker in service from 1961 until 2012. It had two sister ships, Dobrynya Nikitich (1960–1998) and Vyuga (1962–1991).

== Description ==
In the mid-1950s, the Soviet Union began developing a new diesel-electric icebreaker design based on the 1942-built steam-powered icebreaker Eisbär to meet the needs of both civilian and naval operators. Built in various configurations until the early 1980s, the Project 97 icebreakers and their derivatives became the largest and longest-running class of icebreakers and icebreaking vessels built in the world. Three of the 32 ships built in total were of the original Project 97 variant.

Project 97 icebreakers were 67.7 metres (222 ft) long overall and had a beam of 18 metres (59 ft). Fully laden, the vessels drew 5.35 metres (17.6 ft) of water and had a displacement of 2,935 tonnes (2,889 long tons). Their three 1,800-horsepower (1,300 kW) 10-cylinder 13D100 two-stroke opposed-piston diesel engines were coupled to generators that powered electric propulsion motors driving two propellers in the stern and a third one in the bow. Project 97 icebreakers were capable of breaking 70 to 75 centimetres (28 to 30 in) thick snow-covered ice at very slow but continuous speed.

Project 97 icebreakers were initially armed with one twin 57 MM AK-257 and one twin 25 mm 2M-3M naval guns, but later disarmed.

== History ==
The second Project 97 icebreaker was laid down at Admiralty Shipyard in Leningrad on 31 May 1960, launched on 20 January 1962, and delivered on 23 October 1961. The ship was named Purga, Russian for "blizzard", and joined the Soviet Navy Twice Red Banner Baltic Fleet. It shared the name with the Project 52K icebreaking patrol ship Purga.

Following the dissolution of the Soviet Union, Purga was passed over to the Russian Navy on 26 July 1992.

Purga was decommissioned on 1 June 2012 and, after a long lay-up which included developing a leak and sinking in its moorings in January 2013, the icebreaker was broken up in 2018.
