= Ilya Muromets (1965 icebreaker) =

Soviet Navy icebreaker

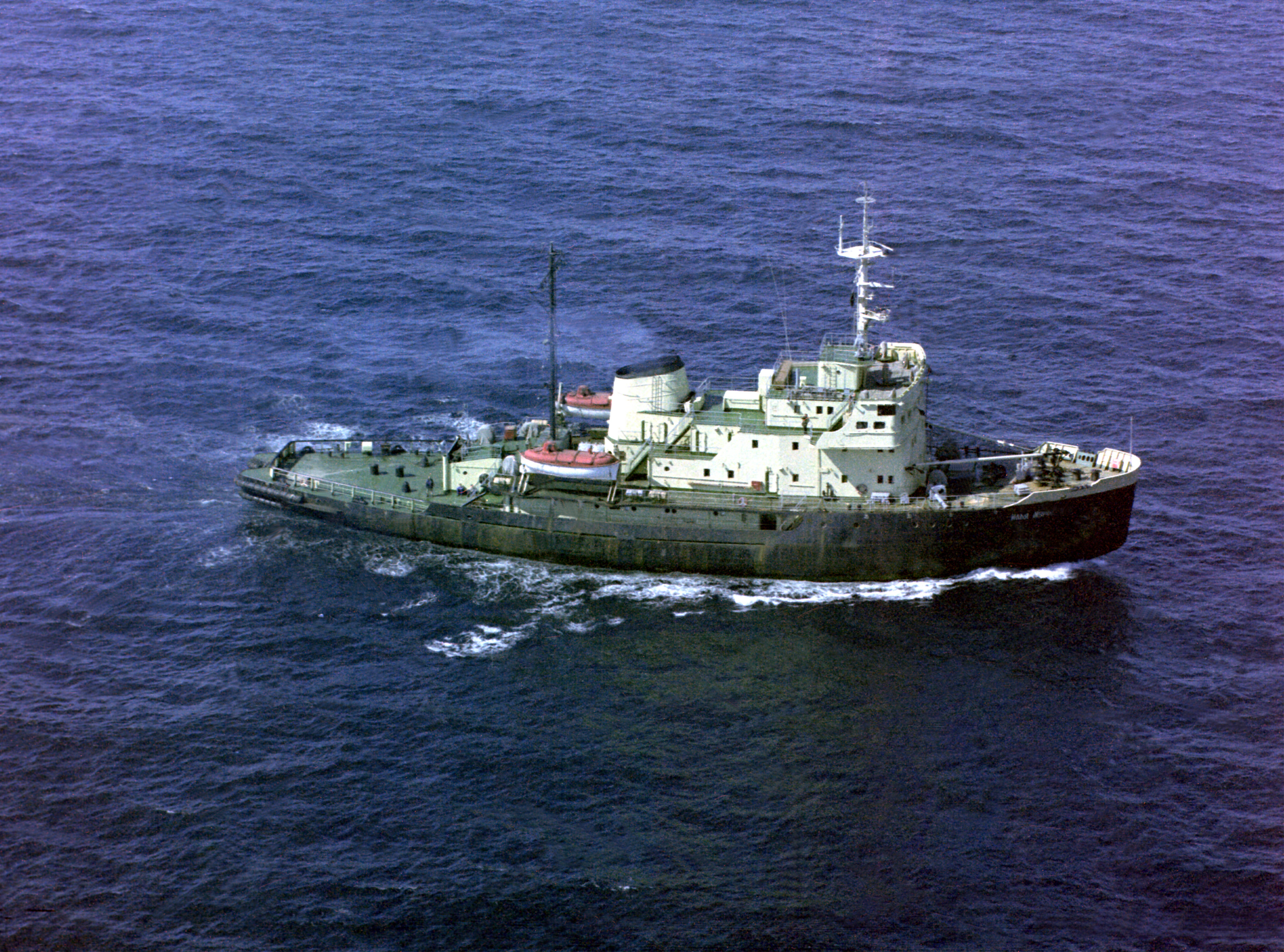
- Ilya Muromets in 1990

History

→ Soviet Union → Russia
- Name: Ilya Muromets (Илья Муромец)
- Namesake: Ilya Muromets
- Operator: Pacific Fleet
- Builder: Admiralty Shipyard (Leningrad, USSR)
- Yard number: 771
- Laid down: 10 March 1965
- Launched: 30 June 1965
- Completed: 28 December 1965
- Decommissioned: 30 June 1993
- In service: 1965–1993
- Identification: IMO number: 7052272
- Fate: Broken up

General characteristics
- Class & type: Dobrynya Nikitich-class icebreaker
- Displacement: 2,935 t (2,889 long tons)
- Length: 67.7 m (222 ft)
- Beam: 18 m (59 ft)
- Draught: 5.35 m (17.6 ft)
- Depth: 8.32 m (27.3 ft)
- Installed power: 3 × 13D100 (3 × 1,800 hp)
- Propulsion: Diesel-electric; three shafts (2 × 2,400 hp + 1,600 hp)
- Speed: 15 knots (28 km/h; 17 mph)
- Range: 5,700 nautical miles (10,600 km; 6,600 mi) at 13 knots (24 km/h; 15 mph)
- Endurance: 17 days
- Complement: 42

Ilya Muromets (Russian: Илья Муромец) was a Soviet Navy icebreaker in service from 1965 until 1993. It had a 1966-built sister ship Buran.

== Description ==
In the mid-1950s, the Soviet Union began developing a new diesel-electric icebreaker design based on the 1942-built steam-powered icebreaker Eisbär to meet the needs of both civilian and naval operators. Built in various configurations until the early 1980s, the Project 97 icebreakers and their derivatives became the largest and longest-running class of icebreakers and icebreaking vessels built in the world. Two unarmed Project 97A icebreakers built for the Soviet Navy are sometimes considered as a separate subclass, Project 97K.

Project 97K icebreakers were 67.7 metres (222 ft) long overall and had a beam of 18 metres (59 ft). Fully laden, the vessels drew 5.35 metres (17.6 ft) of water and had a displacement of 2,935 tonnes (2,889 long tons). Their three 1,800-horsepower (1,300 kW) 10-cylinder 13D100 two-stroke opposed-piston diesel engines were coupled to generators that powered electric propulsion motors driving two propellers in the stern and a third one in the bow. Project 97K icebreakers were capable of breaking 70 to 75 centimetres (28 to 30 in) thick snow-covered ice at very slow but continuous speed.

Unlike the three Project 97 icebreakers built for the Soviet Navy in 1960–1962, the later Project 97K variants were unarmed.

== History ==
The first of two Project 97K icebreakers was laid down at Admiralty Shipyard in Leningrad on 10 March 1965, launched on 30 June 1965, and delivered on 28 December 1965. The ship was named Ilya Muromets after the Russian folk hero and joined the Soviet Navy Red Banner Pacific Fleet.

Ilya Muromets was decommissioned in on 30 June 1993 and broken up afterwards.
