= Buran (icebreaker) =

Operational Russian Navy icebreaker built in 1966

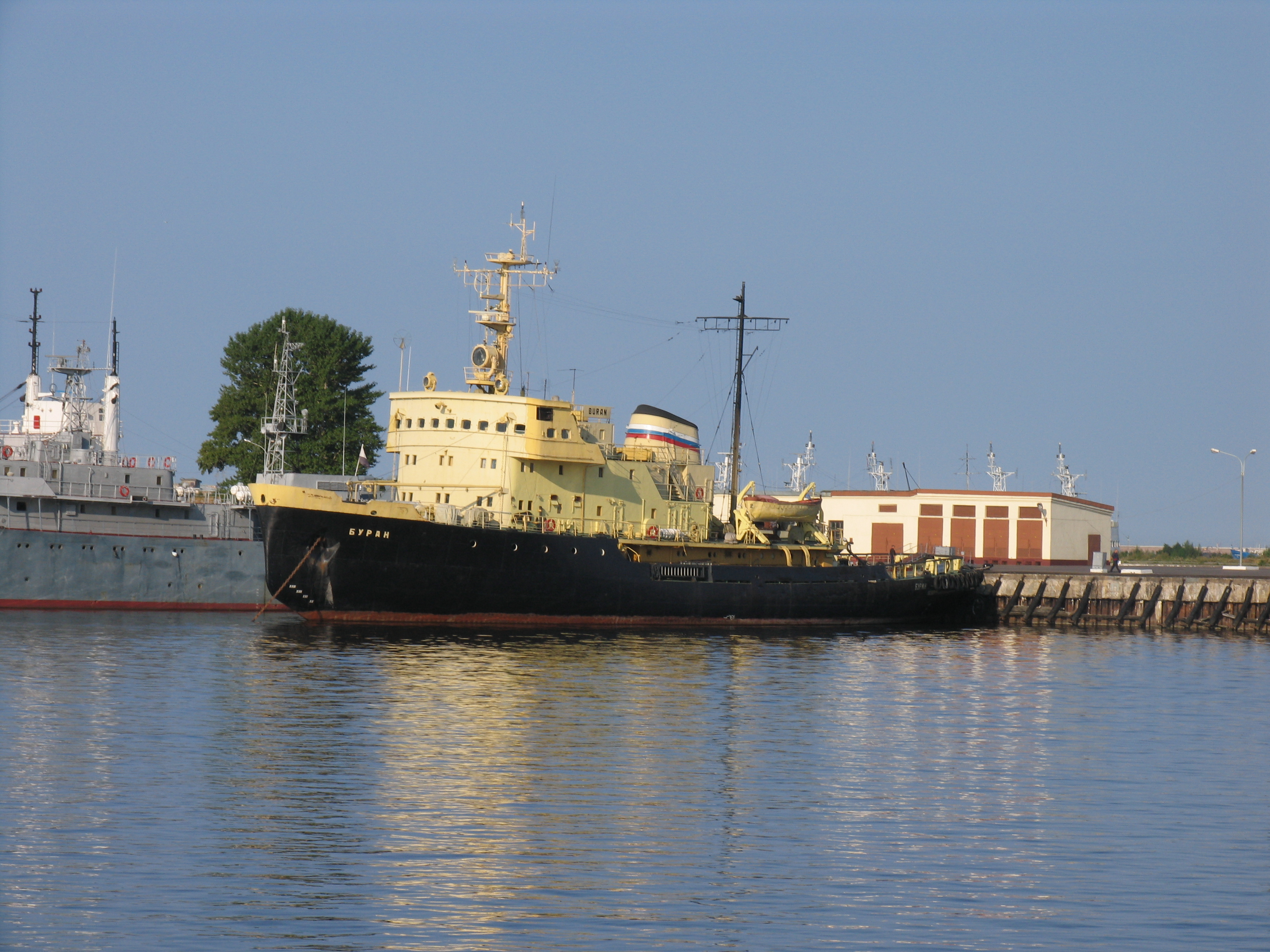
- Buran in 2010

History

→ Soviet Union → Russia
- Name: Buran (Буран)
- Namesake: Russian for "blizzard"
- Operator: Baltic Fleet
- Builder: Admiralty Shipyard (Leningrad, USSR)
- Yard number: 773
- Laid down: 21 January 1966
- Launched: 16 May 1966
- Completed: 24 October 1966
- In service: 1966–present
- Identification: IMO number: 4622337
- Status: In service

General characteristics
- Class & type: Dobrynya Nikitich-class icebreaker
- Displacement: 2,935 t (2,889 long tons)
- Length: 67.7 m (222 ft)
- Beam: 18 m (59 ft)
- Draught: 5.35 m (17.6 ft)
- Depth: 8.32 m (27.3 ft)
- Installed power: 3 × 13D100 (3 × 1,800 hp)
- Propulsion: Diesel-electric; three shafts (2 × 2,400 hp + 1,600 hp)
- Speed: 15 knots (28 km/h; 17 mph)
- Range: 5,700 nautical miles (10,600 km; 6,600 mi) at 13 knots (24 km/h; 15 mph)
- Endurance: 17 days
- Complement: 42

Buran (Russian: Буран, lit. 'Buran') is a Russian Navy icebreaker. It was built at Admiralty Shipyard in Leningrad, Soviet Union, in 1966 and remains in service as of 2023.

Buran had a sister ship, Ilya Muromets, which was built in 1965 and decommissioned in 1993.

== Description ==
In the mid-1950s, the Soviet Union began developing a new diesel-electric icebreaker design based on the 1942-built steam-powered icebreaker Eisbär to meet the needs of both civilian and naval operators. Built in various configurations until the early 1980s, the Project 97 icebreakers and their derivatives became the largest and longest-running class of icebreakers and icebreaking vessels built in the world. Two unarmed Project 97A icebreakers built for the Soviet Navy are sometimes considered as a separate subclass, Project 97K.

Project 97K icebreakers were 67.7 metres (222 ft) long overall and had a beam of 18 metres (59 ft). Fully laden, the vessels drew 5.35 metres (17.6 ft) of water and had a displacement of 2,935 tonnes (2,889 long tons). Their three 1,800-horsepower (1,300 kW) 10-cylinder 13D100 two-stroke opposed-piston diesel engines were coupled to generators that powered electric propulsion motors driving two propellers in the stern and a third one in the bow. Project 97K icebreakers were capable of breaking 70 to 75 centimetres (28 to 30 in) thick snow-covered ice at very slow but continuous speed.

Unlike the three Project 97 icebreakers built for the Soviet Navy in 1960–1962, the later Project 97K variants were unarmed.

== History ==
The second of two Project 97K icebreakers was laid down at Admiralty Shipyard in Leningrad on 21 January 1966, launched on 16 May 1966, and delivered on 24 October 1966 . The ship was named Buran, Russian for "blizzard", and joined the Soviet Navy Twice Red Banner Baltic Fleet.

As of 2023, Buran remains in service with the Russian Navy Baltic Fleet.
