= Yuriy Lisyanskiy (icebreaker) =

Soviet/Russian Icebreaker (1965-2021)

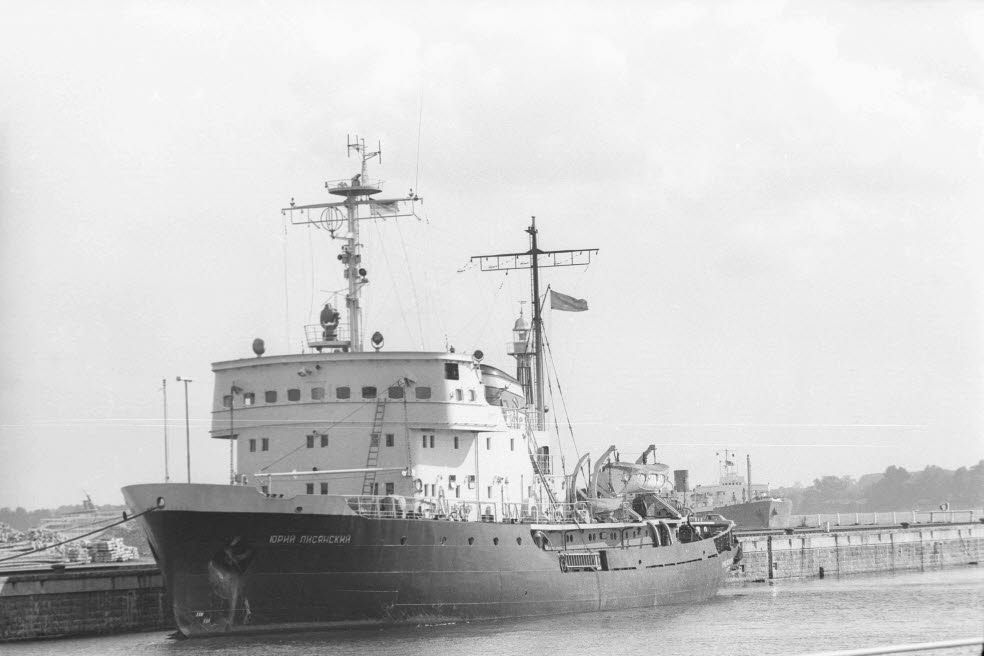
- Yuriy Lisyanskiy in Kiel in September 1970

History

→ Soviet Union → Russia
- Name: Ledokol-9 (Ледокол-9) (1965–1966); Yuriy Lisyanskiy (Юрий Лисянский) (1966–2021)
- Namesake: Yuri Lisyansky
- Owner: Baltic Sea Shipping Company (1965–1996); Balttrans (1996–2004); Tangra-Oil (2004–2009); Olimar (2009–2010); Rosmorport (2010–2021)
- Port of registry: Leningrad, Soviet Union (1965–1992); Saint Petersburg, Russia (1992–2021)
- Builder: Admiralty Shipyard (Leningrad, USSR)
- Yard number: 772
- Laid down: 30 June 1965
- Launched: 31 August 1965
- Completed: 30 December 1965
- Decommissioned: September 2021
- In service: 1965–2021
- Identification: IMO number: 6521850
- Fate: To be broken up

General characteristics
- Class & type: Dobrynya Nikitich-class icebreaker
- Displacement: 2,935 t (2,889 long tons)
- Length: 67.7 m (222 ft)
- Beam: 18 m (59 ft)
- Draught: 5.35 m (17.6 ft)
- Depth: 8.3 m (27.2 ft)
- Installed power: 3 × 13D100 (3 × 1,800 hp)
- Propulsion: Diesel-electric; three shafts (2 × 2,400 hp + 1,600 hp)
- Speed: 15 knots (28 km/h; 17 mph)
- Range: 5,700 nautical miles (10,600 km; 6,600 mi) at 13 knots (24 km/h; 15 mph)
- Endurance: 17 days
- Complement: 42

Yuriy Lisyanskiy (Russian: Юрий Лисянский) was a Soviet and later Russian icebreaker in service from 1965 until 2021. It was one of twelve Project 97A icebreakers built by Admiralty Shipyard in Leningrad in 1961–1971.

== Description ==
In the mid-1950s, the Soviet Union began developing a new diesel-electric icebreaker design based on the 1942-built steam-powered icebreaker Eisbär to meet the needs of both civilian and naval operators. Built in various configurations until the early 1980s, the Project 97 icebreakers and their derivatives became the largest and longest-running class of icebreakers and icebreaking vessels built in the world. Of the 32 ships built in total, the unarmed civilian variant Project 97A was the most numerous with twelve icebreakers built in 1961–1971.

Project 97A icebreakers were 67.7 metres (222 ft) long overall and had a beam of 18 metres (59 ft). Fully laden, the vessels drew 5.35 metres (17.6 ft) of water and had a displacement of 2,935 tonnes (2,889 long tons). Their three 1,800-horsepower (1,300 kW) 10-cylinder 13D100 two-stroke opposed-piston diesel engines were coupled to generators that powered electric propulsion motors driving two propellers in the stern and a third one in the bow. Project 97A icebreakers were capable of breaking 70 to 75 centimetres (28 to 30 in) thick snow-covered ice at very slow but continuous speed.

== History ==
The ninth of twelve Project 97A icebreakers was laid down at Admiralty Shipyard in Leningrad on 30 June 1965, launched on 31 August 1965, and delivered to the Baltic Sea Shipping Company on 30 December 1965. Initially named simply Ledokol-9 (Russian: Ледокол-9), Russian for "icebreaker", it was renamed Yuriy Lisyanskiy in 1966 after Yuri Fedorovich Lisyansky (1773–1837), an Imperial Russian Navy officer who led the first Russian circumnavigation aboard Neva. The icebreaker was stationed in Leningrad.

Following the dissolution of the Soviet Union, Yuriy Lisyanskiy passed over to the successor state, Russia, and went through a number of ownership changes before ending up in Rosmorport's fleet.

The icebreaker was disclassed by Russian Maritime Register of Shipping in September 2021. In January 2023, Rosmorport announced that it was looking for a company to dispose of the 1965-built icebreaker by 1 November 2023 and sell the resulting ferrous and non-ferrous scrap.
