= Ivan Kruzenstern (icebreaker) =

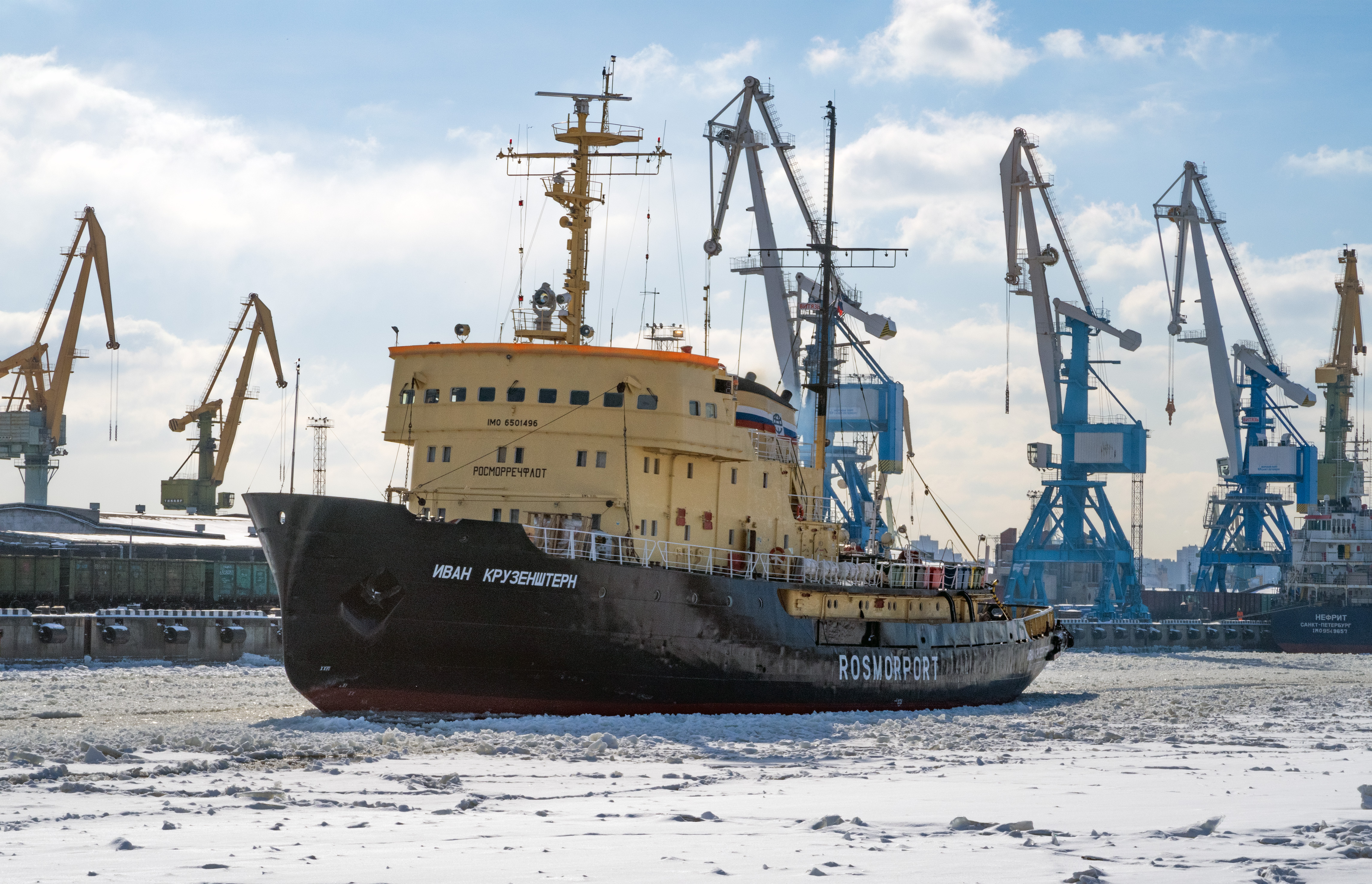
- Ivan Kruzenstern in 2021

History

→ Soviet Union → Russia
- Name: Ledokol-6 (Ледокол-6) (1964–1966); Ivan Kruzenstern (Иван Крузенштерн) (1966–present)
- Namesake: Adam Johann von Krusenstern
- Owner: Baltic Sea Shipping Company (1964–1995); Port of Saint Petersburg (1995–2005); Rosmorport (2005–present)
- Port of registry: Leningrad, Soviet Union (1965–1992); Saint Petersburg, Russia (1992–present)
- Builder: Admiralty Shipyard (Leningrad, USSR)
- Yard number: 768
- Laid down: 20 January 1964
- Launched: 29 April 1964
- Completed: 27 October 1964
- In service: 1964–present
- Identification: IMO number: 6501496
- Status: In service

General characteristics (as built)
- Class & type: Dobrynya Nikitich-class icebreaker
- Displacement: 2,935 t (2,889 long tons)
- Length: 67.7 m (222 ft)
- Beam: 18 m (59 ft)
- Draught: 5.35 m (17.6 ft)
- Depth: 8.3 m (27.2 ft)
- Installed power: 3 × 13D100 (3 × 1,800 hp)
- Propulsion: Diesel-electric; three shafts (2 × 2,400 hp + 1,600 hp)
- Speed: 15 knots (28 km/h; 17 mph)
- Range: 5,700 nautical miles (10,600 km; 6,600 mi) at 13 knots (24 km/h; 15 mph)
- Endurance: 17 days
- Complement: 42

General characteristics (after refit)
- Installed power: 3 × Wärtsilä 6L26 (3 × 1,500 kW)
- Notes: Otherwise same as built

Ivan Kruzenstern (Russian: Иван Крузенштерн) is a Russian icebreaker. It is one of twelve Project 97A icebreakers built by Admiralty Shipyard in Leningrad, Soviet Union, in 1961–1971.

== Description ==
In the mid-1950s, the Soviet Union began developing a new diesel-electric icebreaker design based on the 1942-built steam-powered icebreaker Eisbär to meet the needs of both civilian and naval operators. Built in various configurations until the early 1980s, the Project 97 icebreakers and their derivatives became the largest and longest-running class of icebreakers and icebreaking vessels built in the world. Of the 32 ships built in total, the unarmed civilian variant Project 97A was the most numerous with twelve icebreakers built in 1961–1971.

Project 97A icebreakers were 67.7 metres (222 ft) long overall and had a beam of 18 metres (59 ft). Fully laden, the vessels drew 5.35 metres (17.6 ft) of water and had a displacement of 2,935 tonnes (2,889 long tons). Their three 1,800-horsepower (1,300 kW) 10-cylinder 13D100 two-stroke opposed-piston diesel engines were coupled to generators that powered electric propulsion motors driving two propellers in the stern and a third one in the bow. Project 97A icebreakers were capable of breaking 70 to 75 centimetres (28 to 30 in) thick snow-covered ice at very slow but continuous speed.

== History ==
The sixth of twelve Project 97A icebreakers was laid down at Admiralty Shipyard in Leningrad on 20 January 1964, launched on 29 April 1964, and delivered to the Baltic Sea Shipping Company on 27 October 1964. Initially named simply Ledokol-6 (Russian: Ледокол-6), Russian for "icebreaker", it was renamed Ivan Kruzenstern in 1966 after the Imperial Russian Navy admiral and explorer Adam Johann von Krusenstern (1770–1846). The icebreaker was stationed in Leningrad.

Following the dissolution of the Soviet Union, Ivan Kruzenstern passed over to the successor state, Russia. The icebreaker was owned by Port of Saint Petersburg in 1995–2005 before joining Rosmorport's fleet. The original main engines were replaced with 1,500 kW (2,000 hp) 6-cylinder Wärtsilä 6L26 units in 1997.

On 26 September 2007, Ivan Kruzenstern's wheelhouse was damaged by fire while the icebreaker was undergoing refit at Kronstadt Marine Plant, causing 19 million rubles worth of damage.

As of 2023, Ivan Kruzenstern is one of the two Project 97A icebreakers still in service.
