= Vyuga =

Vyuga may refer to:

- RPK-2 Vyuga, a Soviet nuclear anti-submarine missile
- Soviet trawler Vyuga
- Vyuga (icebreaker)
