= Yerofey Khabarov (icebreaker) =

History

Soviet Union
- Name: Ledokol-5 (Ледокол-5) (1963–1966); Yerofey Khabarov (Ерофей Хабаров) (1966–1993)
- Namesake: Yerofey Khabarov
- Owner: Far East Shipping Company
- Port of registry: Magadan, Soviet Union (1963–1992); Magadan, Russia (1992–1993)
- Builder: Admiralty Shipyard (Leningrad, USSR)
- Yard number: 767
- Laid down: 5 April 1963
- Launched: 24 August 1963
- Completed: 7 December 1963
- Decommissioned: 1993
- In service: 1963–1993
- Identification: IMO number: 6500789
- Fate: Broken up

General characteristics
- Class & type: Dobrynya Nikitich-class icebreaker
- Displacement: 2,935 t (2,889 long tons)
- Length: 67.7 m (222 ft)
- Beam: 18 m (59 ft)
- Draught: 5.35 m (17.6 ft)
- Depth: 8.3 m (27.2 ft)
- Installed power: 3 × 13D100 (3 × 1,800 hp)
- Propulsion: Diesel-electric; three shafts (2 × 2,400 hp + 1,600 hp)
- Speed: 15 knots (28 km/h; 17 mph)
- Range: 5,700 nautical miles (10,600 km; 6,600 mi) at 13 knots (24 km/h; 15 mph)
- Endurance: 17 days
- Complement: 42

Yerofey Khabarov (Russian: Ерофей Хабаров) was a Soviet and later Russian icebreaker in service from 1963 until 1993. It was one of twelve Project 97A icebreakers built by Admiralty Shipyard in Leningrad in 1961–1971.

== Description ==
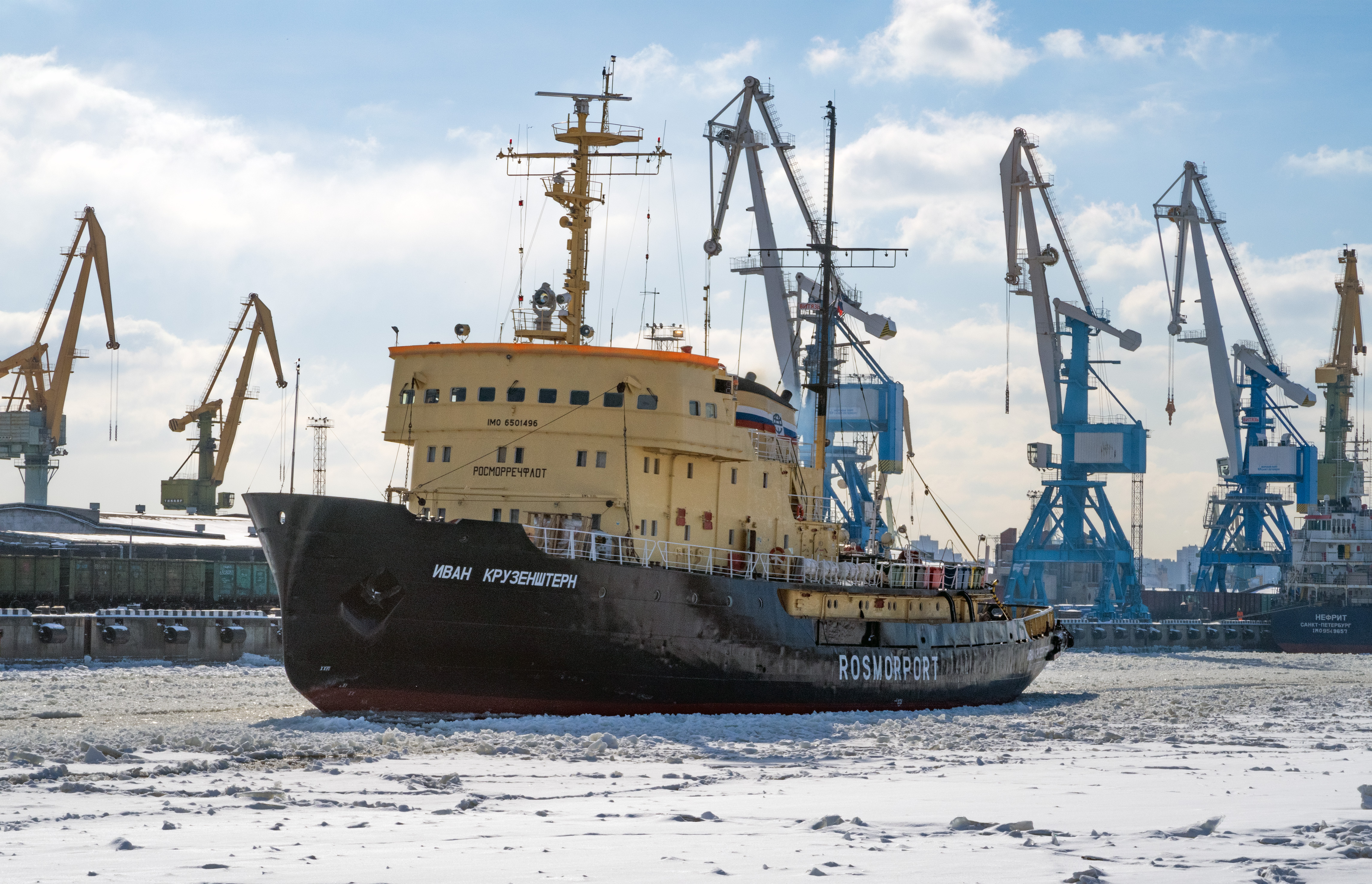
Ivan Kruzenstern, a similar Project 97A icebreaker

In the mid-1950s, the Soviet Union began developing a new diesel-electric icebreaker design based on the 1942-built steam-powered icebreaker Eisbär to meet the needs of both civilian and naval operators. Built in various configurations until the early 1980s, the Project 97 icebreakers and their derivatives became the largest and longest-running class of icebreakers and icebreaking vessels built in the world. Of the 32 ships built in total, the unarmed civilian variant Project 97A was the most numerous with twelve icebreakers built in 1961–1971.

Project 97A icebreakers were 67.7 metres (222 ft) long overall and had a beam of 18 metres (59 ft). Fully laden, the vessels drew 5.35 metres (17.6 ft) of water and had a displacement of 2,935 tonnes (2,889 long tons). Their three 1,800-horsepower (1,300 kW) 10-cylinder 13D100 two-stroke opposed-piston diesel engines were coupled to generators that powered electric propulsion motors driving two propellers in the stern and a third one in the bow. Project 97A icebreakers were capable of breaking 70 to 75 centimetres (28 to 30 in) thick snow-covered ice at very slow but continuous speed.

== History ==
The fifth of twelve Project 97A icebreakers was laid down at Admiralty Shipyard in Leningrad on 5 April 1963, launched on 24 August 1963, and delivered to the Far East Shipping Company on 7 December 1963. Initially named simply Ledokol-5 (Russian: Ледокол-5), Russian for "icebreaker", it was renamed Yerofey Khabarov in 1966 after the 17th century Russian entrepreneur and adventurer. The icebreaker was stationed in Magadan in the Russian Far East.

Following the dissolution of the Soviet Union, Khariton Laptev passed over to the successor state, Russia.

Yerofey Khabarov was taken out of service in 1993 and sold to India for scrapping.
