= Sadko (1968 icebreaker) =

Soviet/Russian military icebreaker (1968-)

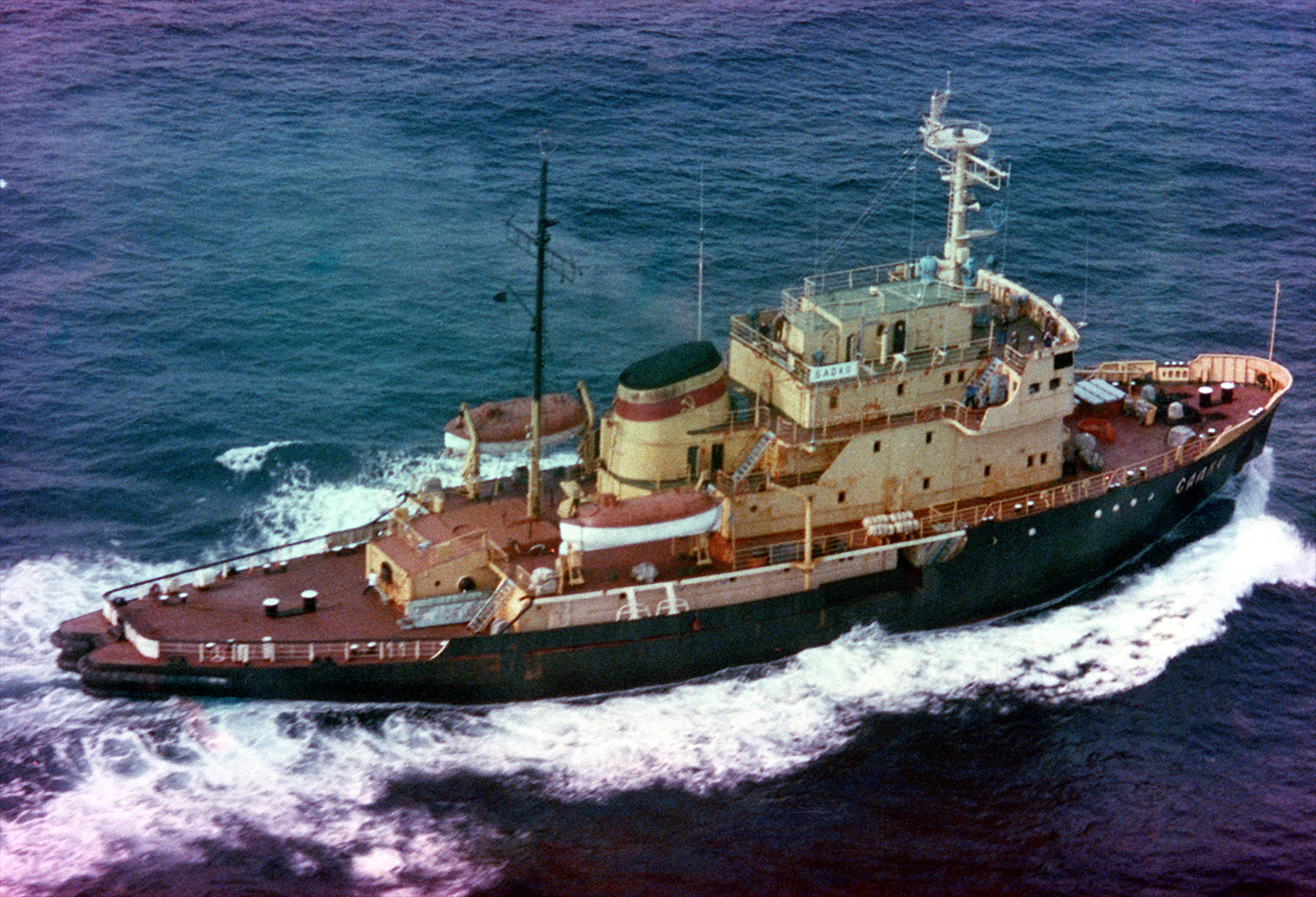

History

→ Soviet Union → Russia
- Name: Sadko (Садко)
- Namesake: Sadko
- Operator: Pacific Fleet
- Builder: Admiralty Shipyard (Leningrad, USSR)
- Yard number: 777
- Laid down: 20 June 1967
- Launched: 28 June 1968
- Completed: 6 November 1968
- In service: 1968–2022
- Fate: Expended as target in 2022

General characteristics
- Class & type: Dobrynya Nikitich-class patrol icebreaker
- Displacement: 3,350 t (3,300 long tons) (full load)
- Length: 67.7 m (222 ft)
- Beam: 18.1 m (59 ft)
- Draught: 6.3 m (20.7 ft)
- Depth: 8.3 m (27.2 ft)
- Installed power: 3 × 13D100 (3 × 1,800 hp)
- Propulsion: Diesel-electric; three shafts (2 × 2,400 hp + 1,600 hp)
- Speed: 14 knots (26 km/h; 16 mph)
- Range: 6,700 nautical miles (12,400 km; 7,700 mi) at 12.5 knots (23.2 km/h; 14.4 mph)
- Endurance: 17 days
- Complement: 39
- Armament: 1 × twin 57 mm AK-257; 1 × twin 25 mm 2M-3M
- Notes: Later disarmed

Sadko (Russian: Садко) was a Soviet and later Russian Navy patrol icebreaker built in 1968. The ship was expended as target during the Umka-2022 military drills in September 2022.

Sadko had a 1970-built sister ship Peresvet.

== Description ==
In the mid-1950s, the Soviet Union began developing a new diesel-electric icebreaker design based on the 1942-built steam-powered icebreaker Eisbär to meet the needs of both civilian and naval operators. Built in various configurations until the early 1980s, the Project 97 icebreakers and their derivatives became the largest and longest-running class of icebreakers and icebreaking vessels built in the world. Two of the 32 ships built were armed patrol icebreakers with increased autonomy time and operating range that enabled them to patrol the western and eastern ends of the Northern Sea Route.

Project 97AP patrol icebreakers were 67.7 metres (222 ft) long overall and had a beam of 18.1 metres (59 ft). Fully laden, the vessels drew 6.3 metres (20.7 ft) of water and had a displacement of 3,350 tonnes (3,300 long tons). Their three 1,800-horsepower (1,300 kW) 10-cylinder 13D100 two-stroke opposed-piston diesel engines were coupled to generators that powered electric propulsion motors driving two propellers in the stern and a third one in the bow.

Project 97AP icebreakers were initially armed with one twin 57 MM AK-257 and one twin 25 mm 2M-3M naval guns, but later disarmed.

== History ==
The first of two Project 97AP patrol icebreakers was laid down at Admiralty Shipyard in Leningrad on 20 June 1967, launched on 28 June 1968, and delivered on 6 November 1968. The ship was named Sadko after the principal character in a Russian medieval epic bylina and joined the Soviet Navy Red Banner Pacific Fleet.

Following the dissolution of the Soviet Union, Sadko was passed over to the Russian Navy on 26 July 1992.

Sadko was expended as target during the Umka-2022 military drills in September 2022. A photograph dated 5 July 2023 shows the fire-damaged wreck moored at Petropavlovsk-Kamchatsky.
