= Semyon Dezhnev (1971 icebreaker) =

History

→ Soviet Union → Russia
- Name: Semyon Dezhnev (Семён Дежнёв)
- Namesake: Semyon Dezhnev
- Owner: Baltic Sea Shipping Company (1971–1996); Port of Saint Petersburg (1996–2005); Rosmorport (2005–present)
- Port of registry: Leningrad, Soviet Union (1971–1992); Saint Petersburg, Russia (1992–present)
- Builder: Admiralty Shipyard (Leningrad, USSR)
- Yard number: 782
- Laid down: 30 March 1971
- Launched: 31 August 1971
- Completed: 28 December 1971
- In service: 1971–present
- Identification: IMO number: 7119446
- Status: In service

General characteristics (as built)
- Class & type: Dobrynya Nikitich-class icebreaker
- Displacement: 2,935 t (2,889 long tons)
- Length: 67.7 m (222 ft)
- Beam: 18 m (59 ft)
- Draught: 5.35 m (17.6 ft)
- Depth: 8.3 m (27.2 ft)
- Installed power: 3 × 13D100 (3 × 1,800 hp)
- Propulsion: Diesel-electric; three shafts (2 × 2,400 hp + 1,600 hp)
- Speed: 15 knots (28 km/h; 17 mph)
- Range: 5,700 nautical miles (10,600 km; 6,600 mi) at 13 knots (24 km/h; 15 mph)
- Endurance: 17 days
- Complement: 42

General characteristics (after refit)
- Installed power: 3 × Wärtsilä 6L26A (3 × 1,500 kW)
- Notes: Otherwise same as built

Semyon Dezhnev (Russian: Семён Дежнёв) is a Russian icebreaker. It is the last of twelve Project 97A icebreakers built by Admiralty Shipyard in Leningrad, Soviet Union, in 1961–1971.

== Description ==
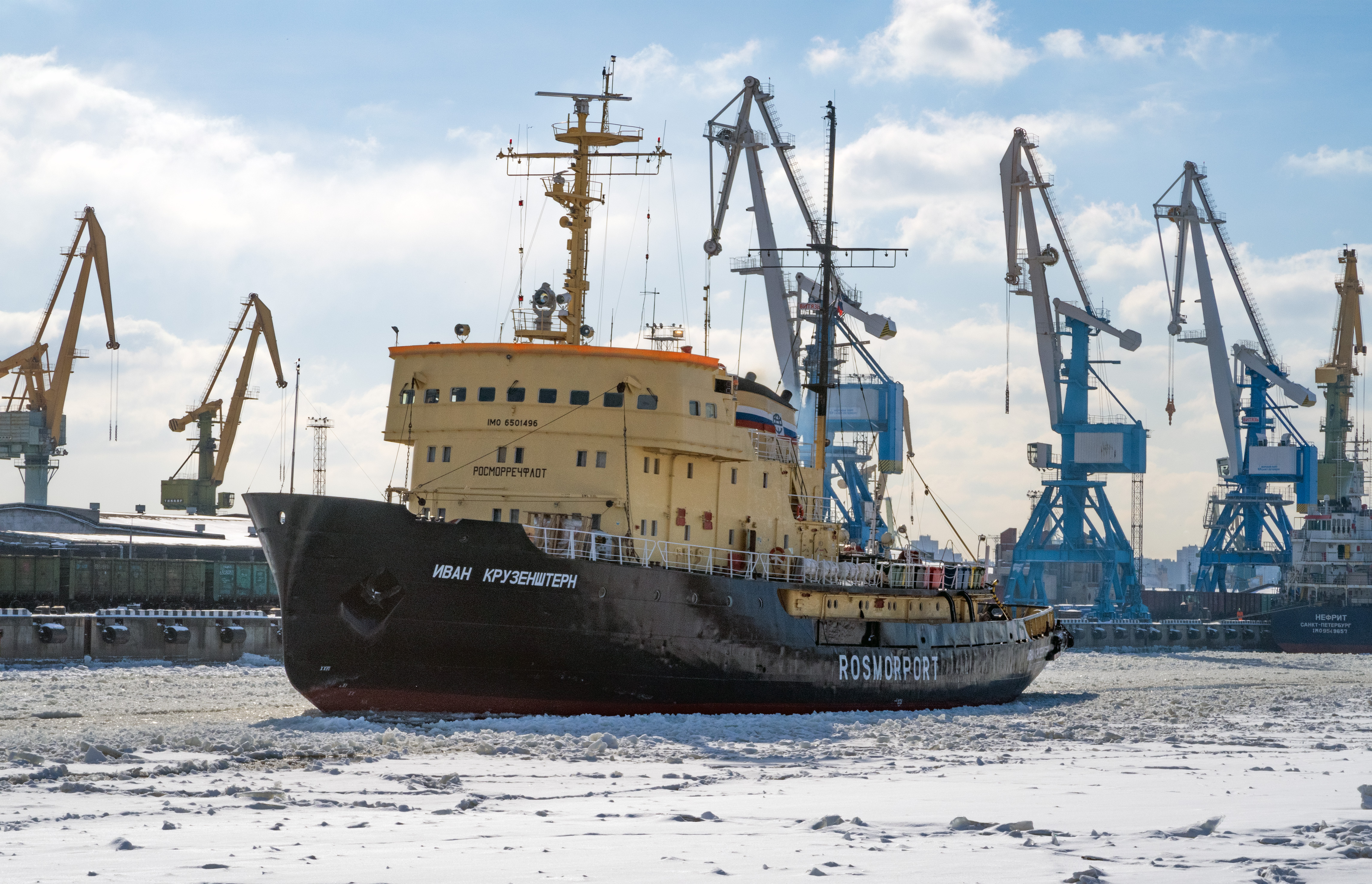
Ivan Kruzenstern, a similar Project 97A icebreaker

In the mid-1950s, the Soviet Union began developing a new diesel-electric icebreaker design based on the 1942-built steam-powered icebreaker Eisbär to meet the needs of both civilian and naval operators. Built in various configurations until the early 1980s, the Project 97 icebreakers and their derivatives became the largest and longest-running class of icebreakers and icebreaking vessels built in the world. Of the 32 ships built in total, the unarmed civilian variant Project 97A was the most numerous with twelve icebreakers built in 1961–1971.

Project 97A icebreakers were 67.7 metres (222 ft) long overall and had a beam of 18 metres (59 ft). Fully laden, the vessels drew 5.35 metres (17.6 ft) of water and had a displacement of 2,935 tonnes (2,889 long tons). Their three 1,800-horsepower (1,300 kW) 10-cylinder 13D100 two-stroke opposed-piston diesel engines were coupled to generators that powered electric propulsion motors driving two propellers in the stern and a third one in the bow. Project 97A icebreakers were capable of breaking 70 to 75 centimetres (28 to 30 in) thick snow-covered ice at very slow but continuous speed.

== History ==
The last of twelve Project 97A icebreakers was laid down at Admiralty Shipyard in Leningrad on 30 March 1971, launched on 31 August 1971, and delivered to the Baltic Sea Shipping Company on 28 December 1971. It was named after the 17th century Russian explorer Semyon Ivanovich Dezhnyov and stationed in Leningrad.

Following the dissolution of the Soviet Union, Semyon Dezhnev passed over to the successor state, Russia. The icebreaker was owned by Port of Saint Petersburg in 1996–2005 before joining Rosmorport's fleet. The original main engines were replaced with 1,500 kW (2,000 hp) 6-cylinder Wärtsilä 6L26A units in 1999.

As of 2023, Semyon Dezhnev is one of the two Project 97A icebreakers still in service.
