= Georgiy Sedov (1967 icebreaker) =

History

→ Soviet Union → Russia
- Name: Georgiy Sedov (Георгий Седов)
- Namesake: Georgy Sedov
- Owner: Hydrographic Service of the USSR (1967–1992); Far East Shipping Company (1992)
- Port of registry: Providence Bay, Soviet Union (1967–1992); Providence Bay, Russia (1992)
- Builder: Admiralty Shipyard (Leningrad, USSR)
- Yard number: 776
- Laid down: 3 January 1967
- Launched: 15 June 1967
- Completed: 30 December 1967
- Decommissioned: 1992
- In service: 1967–1992
- Identification: IMO number: 7117137
- Fate: Broken up

General characteristics
- Class & type: Dobrynya Nikitich-class icebreaker and hydrographic survey vessel
- Displacement: 3,350 t (3,300 long tons)
- Length: 67.7 m (222 ft)
- Beam: 18.1 m (59 ft)
- Draught: 6.3 m (20.7 ft)
- Depth: 8.3 m (27.2 ft)
- Installed power: 3 × 13D100 (3 × 1,800 hp)
- Propulsion: Diesel-electric; three shafts (2 × 2,400 hp + 1,600 hp)
- Speed: 15 knots (28 km/h; 17 mph)
- Range: 6,700 nautical miles (12,400 km; 7,700 mi) at 13 knots (24 km/h; 15 mph)
- Endurance: 17 days
- Complement: 42

Georgiy Sedov (Russian: Георгий Седов) was a Soviet and later Russian icebreaker and hydrographic survey vessel in service from 1967 until 1992.

== Description ==
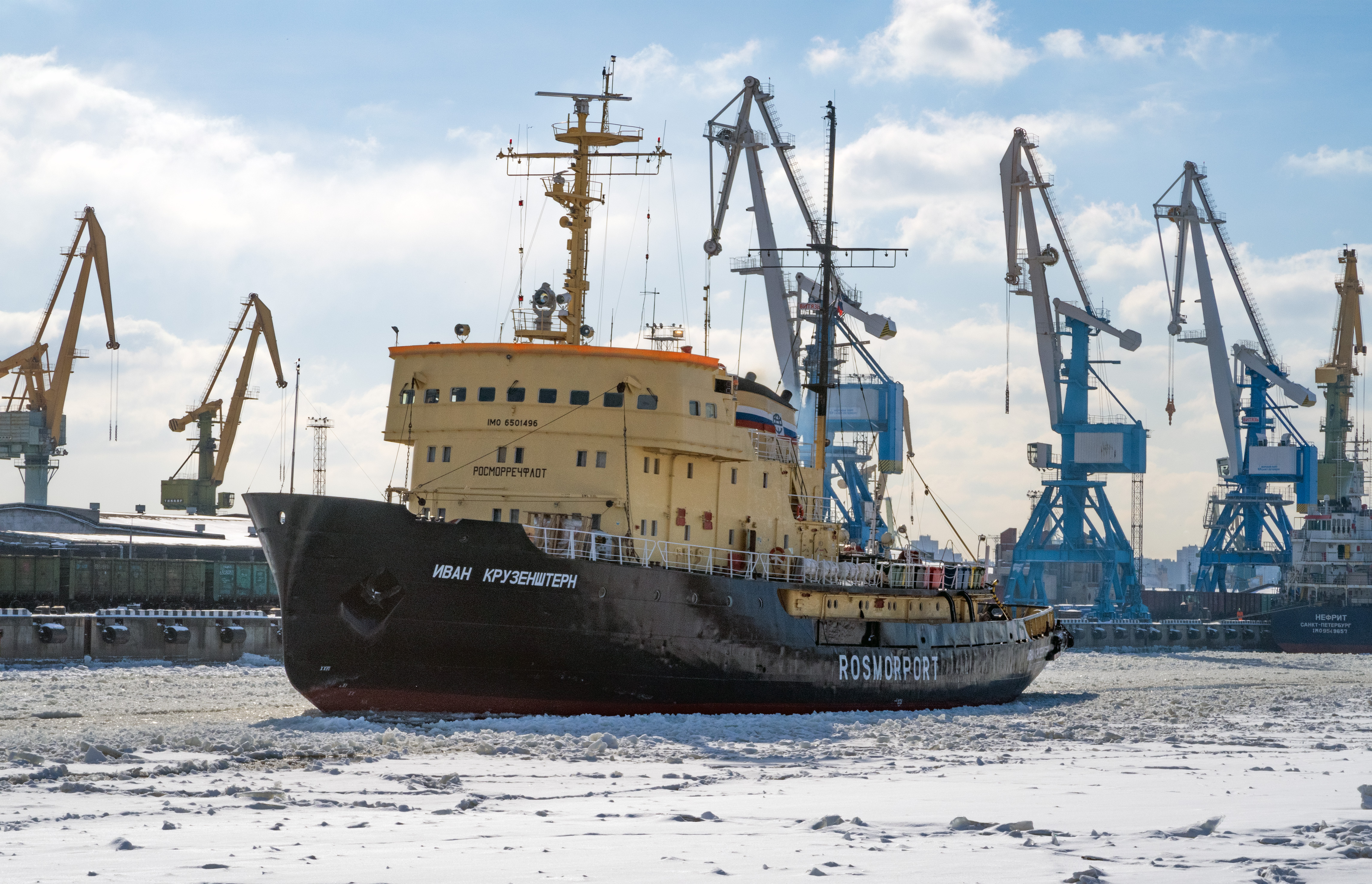
Ivan Kruzenstern, a similar Project 97A icebreaker

In the mid-1950s, the Soviet Union began developing a new diesel-electric icebreaker design based on the 1942-built steam-powered icebreaker Eisbär to meet the needs of both civilian and naval operators. Built in various configurations until the early 1980s, the Project 97 icebreakers and their derivatives became the largest and longest-running class of icebreakers and icebreaking vessels built in the world. Of the 32 ships built in total, two Project 97D icebreakers were built with additional facilities for hydrographic surveys.

Project 97D icebreakers were 67.7 metres (222 ft) long overall and had a beam of 18.1 metres (59 ft). Fully laden, the vessels drew 6.3 metres (20.7 ft) of water and had a displacement of 3,350 tonnes (3,300 long tons). Their three 1,800-horsepower (1,300 kW) 10-cylinder 13D100 two-stroke opposed-piston diesel engines were coupled to generators that powered electric propulsion motors driving two propellers in the stern and a third one in the bow.

Compared to baseline Project 97 icebreakers, the vessels fitted for hydrographic surveys featured additional scientific facilities, echosounders to conduct hydrographic survey, and accommodation for an additional 14 personnel.

== History ==
The second of two Project 97D icebreakers was laid down at Admiralty Shipyard in Leningrad on 3 January 1967, launched on 15 June 1967, and delivered on 30 December 1967. The vessel was named after the Russian late 19th and early 20th century Arctic explorer Georgy Yakovlevich Sedov (1877–1914). The vessel entered service with the Hydrographic Service of the USSR and was registered in Providence Bay.

Georgiy Sedov was one of the numerous icebreakers involved in the shipping crisis in the Soviet Eastern Arctic where unprecedented ice conditions caused a major disturbance to shipping at the end of the 1983 navigating season. The icebreaker lost three propeller blades and a rudder, and had to be towed to Pevek by the SA-15 type Arctic freighter Bratsk.

Following the dissolution of the Soviet Union, Georgiy Sedov passed over to the successor state, Russia. The ownership of the vessel was transferred to the Far East Shipping Company in 1992 and the vessel was sold for scrap in the same year. The icebreaker was broken up in Alang, India.
