= Dobrynya Nikitich (icebreaker) =

Russian naval vessel (1960–1998)

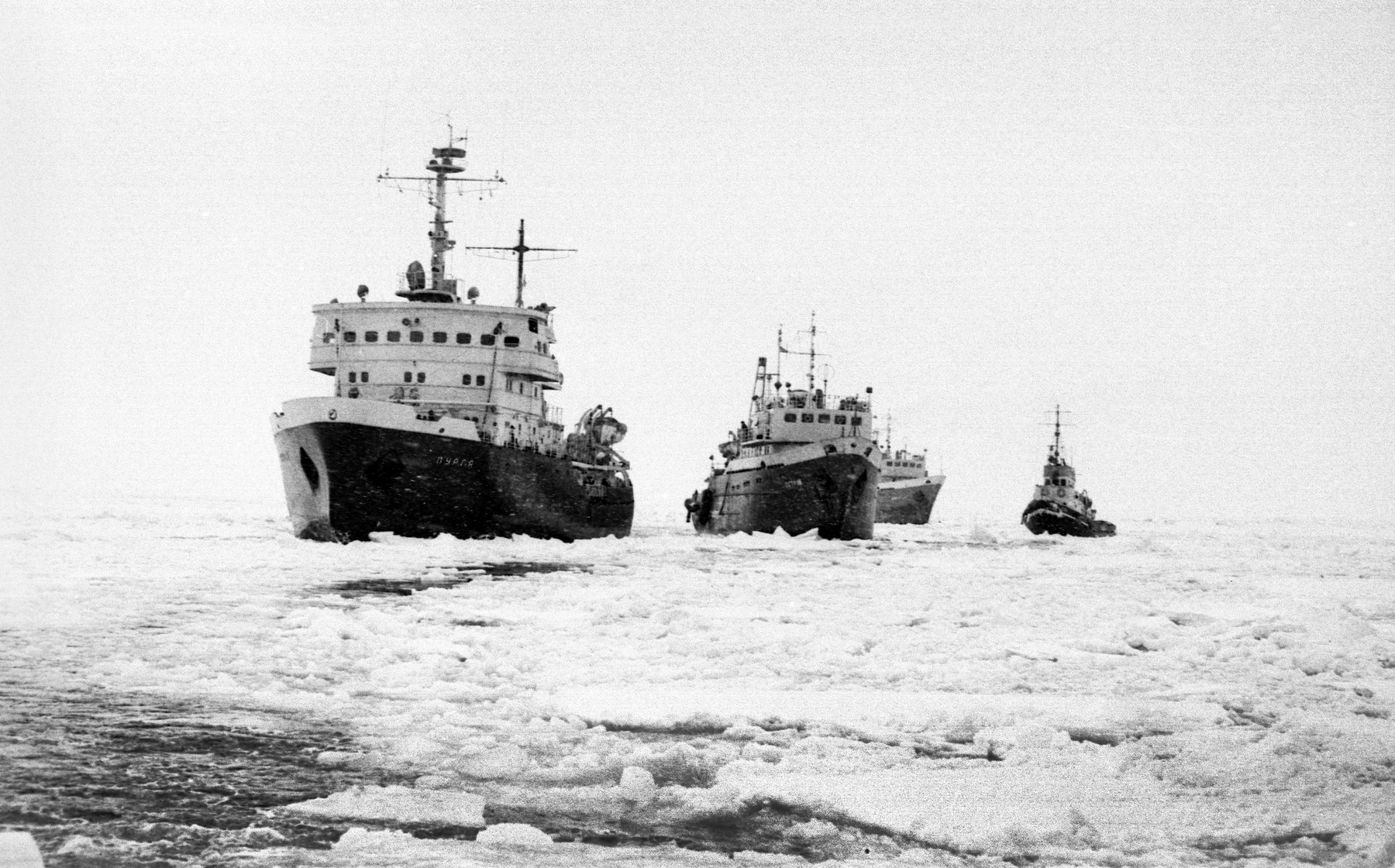
- Purga, a similar Project 97 icebreaker

History

→ Soviet Union → Russia
- Name: Dobrynya Nikitich (Добрыня Никитич)
- Namesake: Dobrynya Nikitich
- Operator: Northern Fleet
- Ordered: 18 May 1957
- Builder: Admiralty Shipyard (Leningrad, USSR)
- Yard number: 760
- Laid down: 20 December 1959
- Launched: 10 May 1960
- Completed: 31 December 1960
- Decommissioned: 1998
- In service: 1960–1998
- Fate: Broken up

General characteristics
- Class & type: Dobrynya Nikitich-class icebreaker
- Displacement: 2,935 t (2,889 long tons)
- Length: 67.7 m (222 ft)
- Beam: 18 m (59 ft)
- Draught: 5.35 m (17.6 ft)
- Depth: 8.3 m (27.2 ft)
- Installed power: 3 × 13D100 (3 × 1,800 hp)
- Propulsion: Diesel-electric; three shafts (2 × 2,400 hp + 1,600 hp)
- Speed: 15 knots (28 km/h; 17 mph)
- Range: 5,700 nautical miles (10,600 km; 6,600 mi) at 13 knots (24 km/h; 15 mph)
- Endurance: 17 days
- Complement: 42
- Armament: 1 × twin 57 mm AK-257; 1 × twin 25 mm 2M-3M
- Notes: Later disarmed

Dobrynya Nikitich (Russian: Добрыня Никитич) was a Soviet and later Russian Navy icebreaker in service from 1960 until 1998. It had two sister ships, Purga (1961–2012) and Vyuga (1962–1991).

== Description ==
In the mid-1950s, the Soviet Union began developing a new diesel-electric icebreaker design based on the 1942-built steam-powered icebreaker Eisbär to meet the needs of both civilian and naval operators. Built in various configurations until the early 1980s, the Project 97 icebreakers and their derivatives became the largest and longest-running class of icebreakers and icebreaking vessels built in the world. Three of the 32 ships built in total were of the original Project 97 variant.

Project 97 icebreakers were 67.7 metres (222 ft) long overall and had a beam of 18 metres (59 ft). Fully laden, the vessels drew 5.35 metres (17.6 ft) of water and had a displacement of 2,935 tonnes (2,889 long tons). Their three 1,800-horsepower (1,300 kW) 10-cylinder 13D100 two-stroke opposed-piston diesel engines were coupled to generators that powered electric propulsion motors driving two propellers in the stern and a third one in the bow. Project 97 icebreakers were capable of breaking 70 to 75 centimetres (28 to 30 in) thick snow-covered ice at very slow but continuous speed.

Project 97 icebreakers were initially armed with one twin 57 MM AK-257 and one twin 25 mm 2M-3M naval guns, but later disarmed.

== History ==
The first Project 97 icebreaker was laid down at Admiralty Shipyard in Leningrad on 20 December 1959, launched on 10 May 1960, and delivered on 31 December 1960. The ship was named Dobrynya Nikitich after the legendary hero of Russian folklore and joined the 18th brigade of support vessels in the Soviet Navy Red Banner Northern Fleet.

Following the dissolution of the Soviet Union, Dobrynya Nikitich was passed over to the Russian Navy on 26 July 1992.

Dobrynya Nikitich was decommissioned in 1998 and broken up afterwards.
