= Peresvet (icebreaker) =

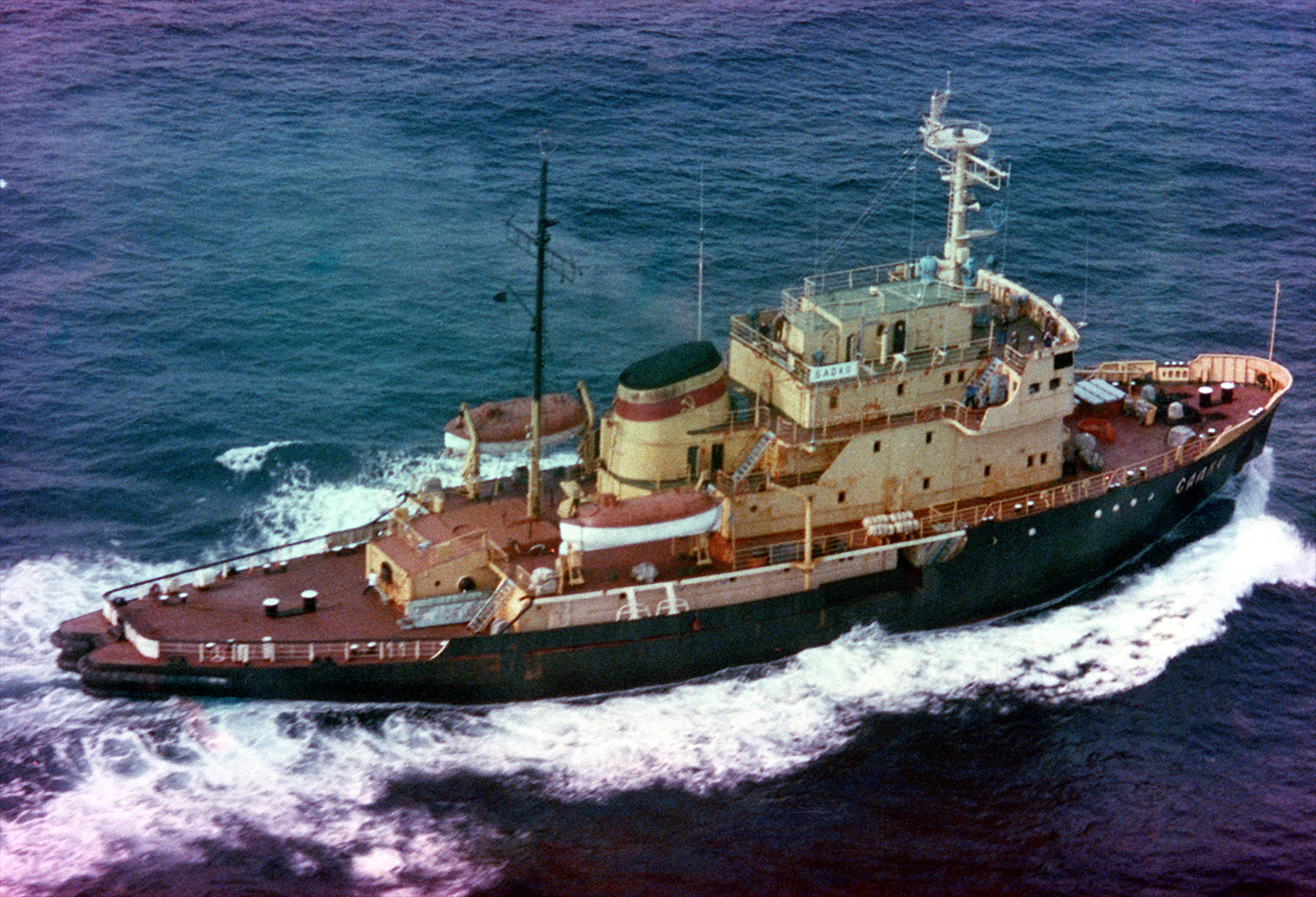
- Sadko, a similar Project 97AP patrol icebreaker

History

→ Soviet Union → Russia
- Name: Peresvet (Пересвет)
- Namesake: Alexander Peresvet
- Operator: Northern Fleet
- Builder: Admiralty Shipyard (Leningrad, USSR)
- Yard number: 778
- Laid down: 10 July 1968
- Launched: 29 January 1969
- Completed: 28 July 1970
- Decommissioned: 23 April 2011
- In service: 1970–2011
- Fate: Broken up

General characteristics
- Class & type: Dobrynya Nikitich-class patrol icebreaker
- Displacement: 3,350 t (3,300 long tons) (full load)
- Length: 67.7 m (222 ft)
- Beam: 18.1 m (59 ft)
- Draught: 6.3 m (20.7 ft)
- Depth: 8.3 m (27.2 ft)
- Installed power: 3 × 13D100 (3 × 1,800 hp)
- Propulsion: Diesel-electric; three shafts (2 × 2,400 hp + 1,600 hp)
- Speed: 14 knots (26 km/h; 16 mph)
- Range: 6,700 nautical miles (12,400 km; 7,700 mi) at 12.5 knots (23.2 km/h; 14.4 mph)
- Endurance: 17 days
- Complement: 39
- Armament: 1 × twin 57 mm AK-257; 1 × twin 25 mm 2M-3M
- Notes: Later disarmed

Peresvet (Russian: Пересвет) was a Soviet and later Russian Navy patrol icebreaker in service from 1970 until 2011. It had a 1968-built sister ship Sadko.

== Description ==
In the mid-1950s, the Soviet Union began developing a new diesel-electric icebreaker design based on the 1942-built steam-powered icebreaker Eisbär to meet the needs of both civilian and naval operators. Built in various configurations until the early 1980s, the Project 97 icebreakers and their derivatives became the largest and longest-running class of icebreakers and icebreaking vessels built in the world. Two of the 32 ships built were armed patrol icebreakers with increased autonomy time and operating range that enabled them to patrol the western and eastern ends of the Northern Sea Route.

Project 97AP patrol icebreakers were 67.7 metres (222 ft) long overall and had a beam of 18.1 metres (59 ft). Fully laden, the vessels drew 6.3 metres (20.7 ft) of water and had a displacement of 3,350 tonnes (3,300 long tons). Their three 1,800-horsepower (1,300 kW) 10-cylinder 13D100 two-stroke opposed-piston diesel engines were coupled to generators that powered electric propulsion motors driving two propellers in the stern and a third one in the bow.

Project 97AP icebreakers were initially armed with one twin 57 MM AK-257 and one twin 25 mm 2M-3M naval guns, but later disarmed.

== History ==
The second of two Project 97AP patrol icebreakers was laid down at Admiralty Shipyard in Leningrad on 10 July 1968, launched on 29 January 1969, and delivered on 28 July 1970. The ship was named Peresvet after Alexander Peresvet, a Russian Orthodox warrior monk who died in a duel at the beginning of the Battle of Kulikovo in 1380, and joined the 18th brigade of support vessels in the Soviet Navy Red Banner Northern Fleet.

Following the dissolution of the Soviet Union, Peresvet was passed over to the Russian Navy on 26 July 1992.

Peresvet was decommissioned on 23 April 2011 and broken up afterwards.
