= Vyuga (icebreaker) =

Soviet Navy icebreaker in service from 1962 until 1991

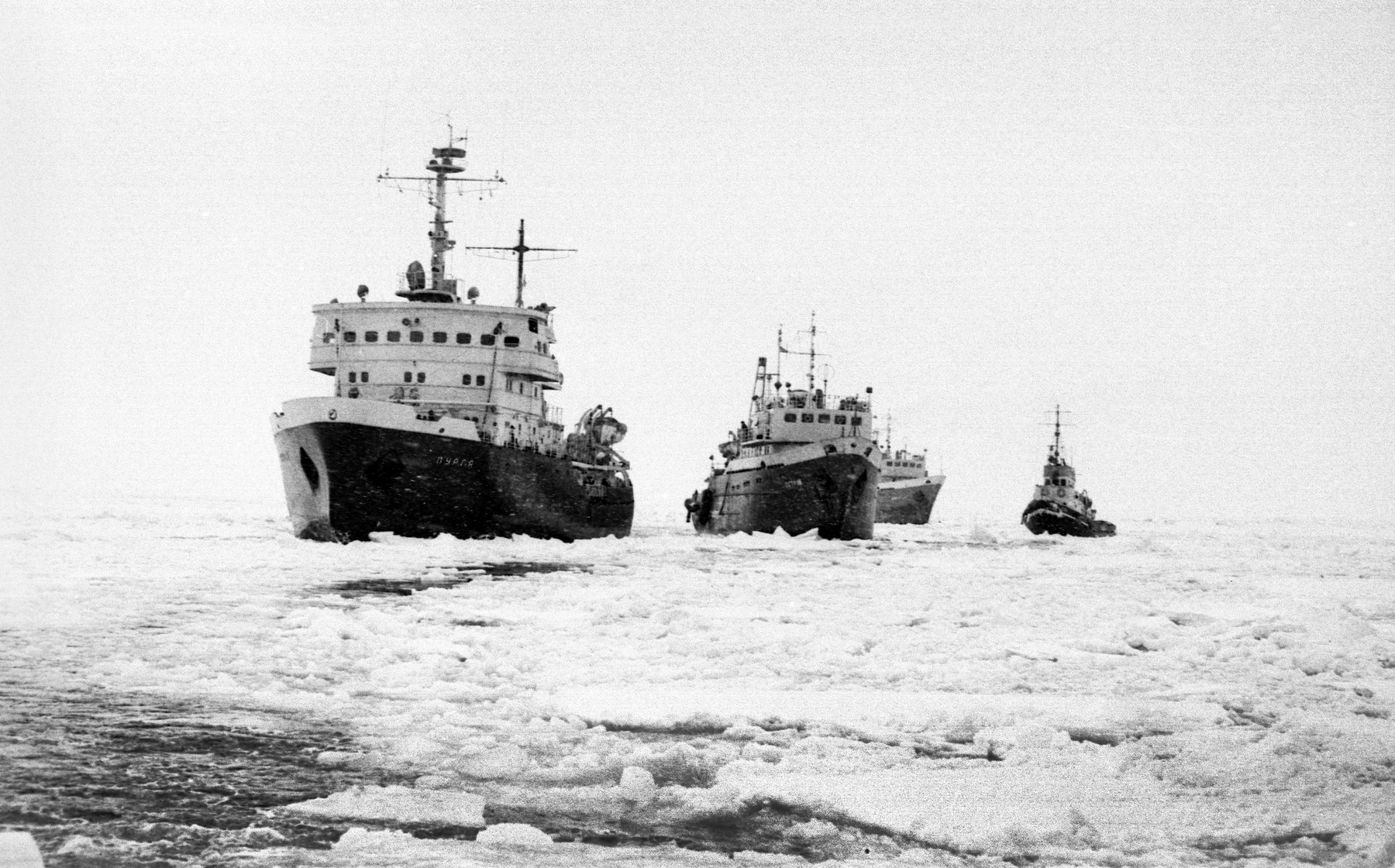
- Purga, a similar Project 97 icebreaker

History

Soviet Union
- Name: Vyuga (Вьюга)
- Namesake: Russian for "blizzard"
- Operator: Pacific Fleet
- Ordered: 18 May 1957
- Builder: Admiralty Shipyard (Leningrad, USSR)
- Yard number: 763
- Laid down: 5 May 1961
- Launched: 20 January 1962
- Completed: 16 July 1962
- Decommissioned: 1991
- In service: 1962–1991
- Fate: Broken up

General characteristics
- Class & type: Dobrynya Nikitich-class icebreaker
- Displacement: 2,935 t (2,889 long tons)
- Length: 67.7 m (222 ft)
- Beam: 18 m (59 ft)
- Draught: 5.35 m (17.6 ft)
- Depth: 8.3 m (27.2 ft)
- Installed power: 3 × 13D100 (3 × 1,800 hp)
- Propulsion: Diesel-electric; three shafts (2 × 2,400 hp + 1,600 hp)
- Speed: 15 knots (28 km/h; 17 mph)
- Range: 5,700 nautical miles (10,600 km; 6,600 mi) at 13 knots (24 km/h; 15 mph)
- Endurance: 17 days
- Complement: 42
- Armament: 1 × twin 57 mm AK-257; 1 × twin 25 mm 2M-3M
- Notes: Later disarmed

Vyuga (Russian: Вьюга, lit. 'blizzard') was a Soviet Navy icebreaker in service from 1962 until 1991. It had two sister ships, Dobrynya Nikitich (1960–1998) and Purga (1961–2012).

== Description ==
In the mid-1950s, the Soviet Union began developing a new diesel-electric icebreaker design based on the 1942-built steam-powered icebreaker Eisbär to meet the needs of both civilian and naval operators. Built in various configurations until the early 1980s, the Project 97 icebreakers and their derivatives became the largest and longest-running class of icebreakers and icebreaking vessels built in the world. Three of the 32 ships built in total were of the original Project 97 variant.

Project 97 icebreakers were 67.7 metres (222 ft) long overall and had a beam of 18 metres (59 ft). Fully laden, the vessels drew 5.35 metres (17.6 ft) of water and had a displacement of 2,935 tonnes (2,889 long tons). Their three 1,800-horsepower (1,300 kW) 10-cylinder 13D100 two-stroke opposed-piston diesel engines were coupled to generators that powered electric propulsion motors driving two propellers in the stern and a third one in the bow. Project 97 icebreakers were capable of breaking 70 to 75 centimetres (28 to 30 in) thick snow-covered ice at very slow but continuous speed.

Project 97 icebreakers were initially armed with one twin 57 MM AK-257 and one twin 25 mm 2M-3M naval guns, but later disarmed.

== History ==
The third and final Project 97 icebreaker was laid down at Admiralty Shipyard in Leningrad on 5 May 1961, launched on 20 January 1962, and delivered on 16 July 1962. The ship was named Vyuga, Russian for "blizzard", and joined the Soviet Navy Red Banner Pacific Fleet.

Vyuga was decommissioned in 1991 and broken up afterwards.
