= Pyotr Pakhtusov =

Russian explorer

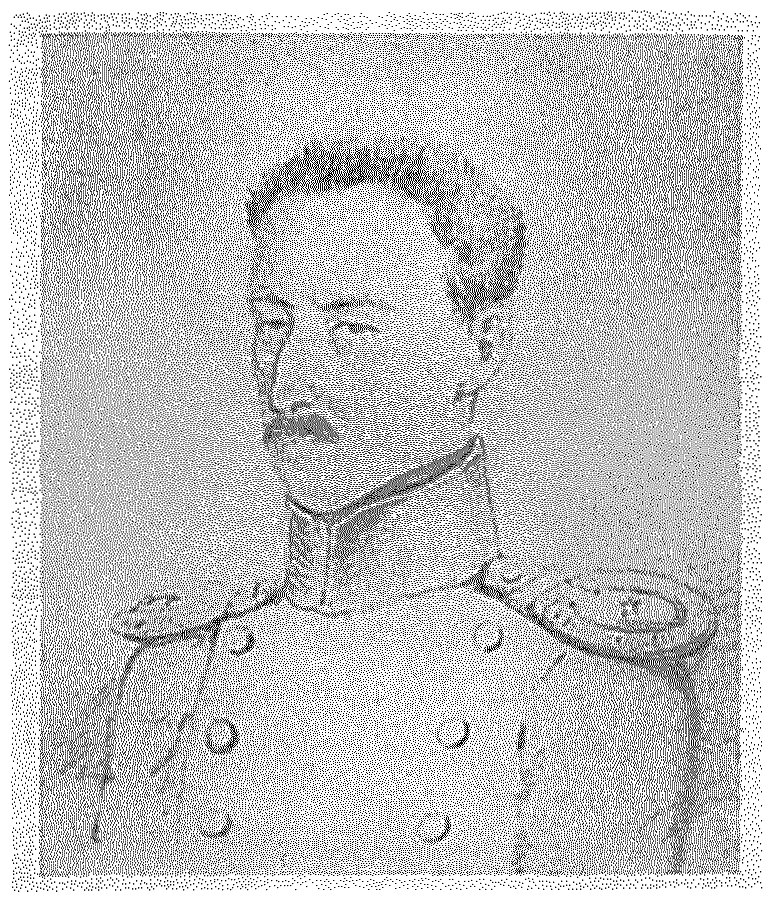
Pyotr Pakhtusov

Pyotr Kuzmich Pakhtusov (Russian: Петр Кузьмич Пахтусов) (1800 in Kronstadt – November 19, 1835 in Arkhangelsk) was a Russian surveyor and Arctic explorer. He is credited with the first thorough survey of Novaya Zemlya.

Between 1832 and 1835, Pakhtusov undertook two exploratory journeys to Novaya Zemlya. He wintered on the island on the two occasions and took detailed meteorological observations.

Pakhtusov carefully surveyed the southern and eastern parts of Novaya Zemlya along with fellow explorer and cartographer Avgust Tsivolko during the last two years of the expedition. Thanks to their work, the first reliable maps of Novaya Zemlya's southern shores and part of the northern island's coastline were published.

A small island in the eastern shore of Novaya Zemlya and a group of islands in the Nordenskiöld Archipelago are named after Pakhtusov. His feat as a scientist and researcher was immortalized in 1886. Colleagues of Pakhtusov and expedition members initiated the creation of a monument in Kronstadt.
