= Dobrynya Nikitich-class icebreaker =

Series of Soviet naval vessels

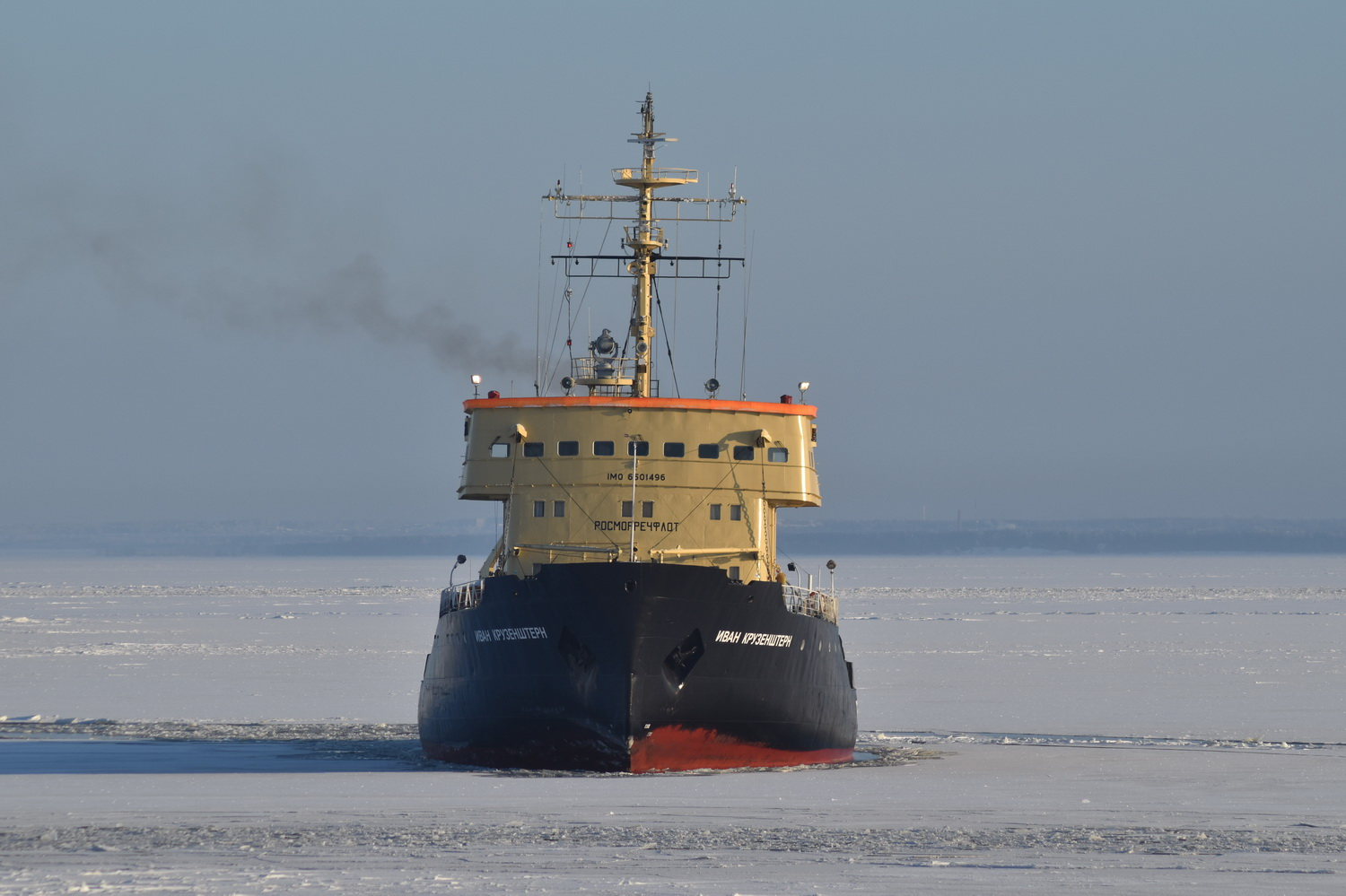
- Ivan Kruzenstern showing the rounded tumblehome hull of the Dobrynya Nikitich-class icebreakers

Class overview
- Name: Dobrynya Nikitich class (various Project 97 variants); Ivan Susanin class (Project 97P)
- Builders: Admiralty Shipyard (Leningrad, USSR)
- Operators: Various
- Subclasses: 97 (icebreaker); 97A (icebreaker); 97K (icebreaker); 97E (icebreaker); 97AP (patrol icebreaker); 97P (patrol ship); 97D (hydrographic survey vessel); 97B (hydrographic survey vessel); 97N (research vessel)
- Built: 1960–1981
- In service: 1960–present
- Completed: 32
- Active: 7
- Laid up: 1
- Lost: 1
- Scrapped: 22
- Preserved: 1

General characteristics
- Type: Icebreaker
- Displacement: 2,935 t (2,889 long tons); 3,350 t (3,300 long tons) (97AP)
- Length: 67.7 m (222 ft)
- Beam: 18.1 m (59 ft)
- Draught: 5.35 metres (17.6 ft); 6.3 m (21 ft) (97AP)
- Installed power: 3 × 13D100 (3 × 1,800 hp)
- Propulsion: Diesel–electric; three shafts (2 × 2,400 hp + 1,600 hp)
- Speed: 14 knots (26 km/h; 16 mph) (maximum)
- Range: 5,500 nautical miles (10,200 km; 6,300 mi); 6,700 nautical miles (12,400 km; 7,700 mi) (97AP)
- Endurance: 17 days
- Crew: 42
- Armament: 1 × twin 57 mm ZIF-31-B (97 and 97AP); 1 × twin 25 mm 2M-3M (97 and 97AP)

Dobrynya Nikitich class, also known by its Soviet designation Project 97, is a diverse series of diesel–electric icebreakers and other icebreaking vessels built in the Soviet Union. In total, 32 vessels were built in various configurations for both civilian and naval service in the 1960s, 1970s and early 1980s, and several remain in service in Russia as of 2024.

Western sources refer to the Project 97 vessels using two different names: Dobrynya Nikitich class for the various icebreaker variants and more heavily-modified derivative designs, and Ivan Susanin class specifically for Project 97P patrol ships.

== Background and construction ==
In the mid-1950s, the Soviet Union began developing a new diesel–electric icebreaker design that could meet the needs of both civilian and naval operators. At the time, the merchant marine relied largely on ageing steam-powered icebreakers, many of which had been built during the Imperial Russia era and would reach the end of their operational life in the coming years. In addition, the Soviet Border Troops possessed just one ice-capable vessel for patrolling the country's northern border, Project 52K patrol ship Purga, which had been laid down already in 1938 but did not enter service until 1957.

Technical development of the new icebreakers was entrusted to Leningrad-based Central Design Bureau No. 15, today known as Central Design Bureau "Iceberg" and part of the state-owned United Shipbuilding Corporation, which based the hull lines on the Swedish-built steam-powered icebreaker Eisbär which Germany had handed over to the Soviet Union as war reparations in 1946. Discussions during technical meetings sometimes became heated as naval architects tried to include both civilian and naval requirements into the design. One of the sources of disagreement was the bow propeller which was considered essential for icebreaking operations in the Baltic Sea and other non-Arctic waters but susceptible to damage in heavier Arctic ice conditions.

Once the final design had been developed, the construction was awarded to the Leningrad-based Admiralty Shipyard. The first series, which consisted of largely similar triple-screw icebreakers, was built at a rapid rate: the hulls were assembled side by side on the slipway and launched at a technical readiness of 60–80%. In 1960–1971, the shipyard delivered up to three vessels annually, often in different configurations, while simultaneously implementing various technical improvements devised during the operation of the first vessels of the series. The second series with eight twin-screw Project 97P patrol ships and one research vessel was built in 1973–1981.

With a total of 32 vessels built in various configurations over more than two decades, Project 97 and its subclasses are the largest and longest-running series of icebreakers and icebreaking vessels built in the world. With the exception of nuclear-powered icebreakers, they were also the only domestically-built post-war icebreakers in the Soviet Union and later Russia until the construction of Project 21900 icebreakers in the late 2000s.

== General characteristics ==
With the exception of few heavily-modified variants, all Dobrynya Nikitich-class icebreakers had a length overall of 67.7 metres (222 ft) and a beam of 18.1 metres (59 ft). Fully laden, the vessels drew between 5.35 and 6.3 metres (17.6 and 20.7 ft) of water corresponding to a full load displacement ranging from 2,935 to 3,350 tonnes (2,889 to 3,297 long tons). The later patrol ship and research vessel variants were somewhat larger than the early icebreakers. The hull form, derived from an older Swedish-built icebreaker, featured a round midship with pronounced tumblehome and practically no flat bottom or sides. While the curved hull lines resulted in low resistance and high maneuverability in ice, the vessels were very uncomfortable in open water due to excessive rolling.

All ships shared the same diesel–electric power plant with three direct current (DC) main diesel generators. The 1,800-horsepower (1,300 kW) 10-cylinder 13D100 (Russian: 13Д100) two-stroke opposed-piston main diesel engines were in fact reverse-engineered Fairbanks Morse 38 8-1/8 diesel engines manufactured by the Malyshev Factory in the Ukrainian Soviet Socialist Republic. The engines were coupled to double-armature DC generators (2 × 625 kWe) that provided power to 1,760 kW (2,400 hp) PG-147 (Russian: ПГ-147) DC propulsion motors driving two 3.5-metre (11 ft) fixed pitch propellers in the stern and a 1,175 kW (1,600 hp) PG-146 (Russian: ПГ-146) DC motor driving a 2.7-metre (9 ft) propeller in the bow. During initial icebreaking trials, the icebreakers were able to break 70 to 75 centimetres (28 to 30 in) thick level ice with a 25-centimetre (9.8 in) snow layer on top at very slow but continuous speed.

== Variants ==
=== Project 97 ===
Three Project 97 icebreakers were built for the Soviet Navy: Dobrynya Nikitich for the Northern Fleet, Purga for the Baltic Fleet, and Vyuga for the Pacific Fleet. While initially armed with 57 mm and 25 mm deck guns, the vessels were later disarmed.

Name(s)	Namesake(s)	Yard number	Laid down	Launched	Completed	In service	Status or fate	Image	Ref
Dobrynya Nikitich (Russian: Добрыня Никитич)	Dobrynya Nikitich	760	20 December 1959	10 May 1960	31 December 1960	1960–1998	Broken up		
Purga (Russian: Пурга)	Russian for "blizzard"	761	31 May 1960	10 December 1960	23 October 1961	1961–2012	Broken up	"Purga" icebreaker in front	
Vyuga (Russian: Вьюга)	Russian for "blizzard"	763	5 May 1961	20 January 1962	16 July 1962	1962–1991	Broken up		

=== Project 97A ===
The series of unarmed icebreakers built for the Ministry of the Maritime Fleet of the Soviet Union, Project 97A, is the most numerous variant of the Project 97 family with twelve vessels built between 1961 and 1971. While initially named simply Ledokol (Russian: Ледокол, romanized: icebreaker) followed by a running number, in 1966 they were given individual names to honor famous Imperial Russian and Soviet polar explorers.

As of 2024, two Project 97A icebreakers remain in service with Rosmorport's North-Western Basin Branch in the Baltic Sea: Ivan Kruzenstern and Semyon Dezhnev.

Name(s)	Namesake(s)	IMO number	Yard number	Laid down	Launched	Completed	In service	Status or fate	Image	Ref
Vasiliy Pronchishchev (Russian: Василий Прончищев; 1966–1989); Ledokol-1 (Russian: Ледокол-1; 1961–1966)	Vasili Pronchishchev	6500765	762	13 December 1960	28 April 1961	30 December 1961	1961–1989	Broken up		
Afanasy Nikitin (Russian: Афанасий Никитин; 1966–1995); Ledokol-2 (Russian: Ледокол-2; 1962–1966)	Afanasy Nikitin	6500791	764	1 November 1961	31 May 1962	1 November 1962	1962–1995	Broken up		
Khariton Laptev (Russian: Харитон Лаптев; 1966–1996); Ledokol-3 (Russian: Ледокол-3; 1962–1966)	Khariton Laptev	6500806	765	10 February 1962	11 August 1962	25 December 1962	1962–1996	Broken up		
Poyar (Russian: Пояр; 1988); Vasiliy Poyarkov (Russian: Василий Поярков; 1966–1988); Ledokol-4 (Russian: Ледокол-4; 1963–1966)	Vassili Poyarkov	6500777	766	13 August 1962	16 March 1963	26 July 1963	1963–1988	Broken up		
Yerofey Khabarov (Russian: Ерофей Хабаров; 1966–1993); Ledokol-5 (Russian: Ледокол-5; 1963–1966)	Yerofey Khabarov	6500789	767	5 April 1963	24 August 1963	7 December 1963	1963–1993	Broken up		
Ivan Kruzenstern (Russian: Иван Крузенштерн; 1966–present); Ledokol-6 (Russian: Ледокол-6; 1964–1966)	Adam Johann von Krusenstern	6501496	768	20 January 1964	29 April 1964	27 October 1964	1964–present	In service		
Vlad (1988); Vladimir Rusanov (Russian: Владимир Русанов; 1966–1988); Ledokol-7 (Russian: Ледокол-7; 1964–1966)	Vladimir Rusanov	6508171	769	30 March 1964	25 July 1964	28 December 1964	1964–1988	Broken up		
Semyon Chelyuskin (Russian: Семён Челюскин; 1966–1988); Ledokol-8 (Russian: Ледокол-8; 1965–1966)	Semyon Chelyuskin	6514522	770	12 December 1964	28 February 1965	11 August 1965	1965–1988	Broken up		
Yuriy Lisyanskiy (Russian: Юрий Лисянский; 1966–2021); Ledokol-9 (Russian: Ледокол-9; 1965–1966)	Yuri Lisyansky	6521850	772	30 June 1965	31 August 1965	30 December 1965	1965–2021	To be broken up		
Fyodor Litke (Russian: Фёдор Литке)	Friedrich von Lütke	7020085	780	12 January 1970	29 July 1970	14 December 1970	1970–2013	Broken up		
Ivan Moskvitin (Russian: Иван Москвитин)	Ivan Moskvitin	7117383	781	2 November 1970	25 March 1971	1 September 1971	1971–1997	Broken up		
Semyon Dezhnev (Russian: Семён Дежнёв)	Semyon Dezhnev	7119446	782	30 March 1971	31 August 1971	28 December 1971	1971–present	In service		

=== Project 97K ===
Two unarmed Project 97A icebreakers built for the Soviet Navy, Ilya Muromets for the Pacific Fleet and Buran for the Baltic Fleet, are sometimes considered as a separate subclass, Project 97K.

As of 2024, Buran remains in service with the Baltic Fleet.

Name(s)	Namesake(s)	IMO number	Yard number	Laid down	Launched	Completed	In service	Status or fate	Image	Ref
Ilya Muromets (Russian: Илья Муромец)	Ilya Muromets	7052272	771	10 March 1965	30 June 1965	28 December 1965	1965–1993	Broken up		
Buran (Russian: Буран)	Russian for "blizzard"	4622337	773	21 January 1966	16 May 1966	24 October 1966	1966–present	In service		

=== Project 97E ===
Project 97E was an unarmed icebreaker variant built for East Germany. The vessel, Stephan Jantzen, was operated by the state-owned shipping company Bagger-, Bugsier- und Bergungsreederei Rostock (BBB) until the German reunification in 1990 and Wasser- und Schifffahrtsamt Stralsund until 2005. After decommissioning, the ship went through a number of owners before ending up as a museum ship in Rostock.

Name(s)	Namesake(s)	IMO number	Yard number	Laid down	Launched	Completed	In service	Status or fate	Image	Ref
Stephan Jantzen (1967–2005); Stephan (2005–2006); King Ice (2006–2008); Stephan Jantzen (2008–2012); König Ludwig II Von Bayern (2012–2013); Stephan Jantzen (2013–present)	Stephan Jantzen; Ludwig II of Bavaria	7117486	775	15 September 1966	30 December 1966	30 November 1967	1967–2005	Museum ship		

=== Project 97AP ===
Project 97AP (Russian: 97АП) was an armed patrol icebreaker variant built for the Soviet Navy. Built with increased autonomy time and operating range, they were intended to patrol the western and eastern ends of the Northern Sea Route. The armament was later dismantled.

Peresvet, which was previously assigned to the Northern Fleet, was decommissioned in 2011 and later scrapped. Sadko, assigned to the Pacific Fleet, was expended as target during the Umka-2022 military drills in September 2022.

Name(s)	Namesake(s)	Yard number	Laid down	Launched	Completed	In service	Status or fate	Image	Ref
Sadko (Russian: Садко)	Sadko	777	20 June 1967	28 June 1968	6 November 1968	1968–2022	Expended as target		
Peresvet (Russian: Пересвет)	Alexander Peresvet	778	10 July 1968	29 January 1969	28 July 1970	1970–2011	Broken up		

=== Project 97D ===
Project 97D (Russian: 97Д) was a hydrographic survey vessel variant built for the Ministry of the Maritime Fleet of the Soviet Union to survey the Northern Sea Route. While otherwise nearly identical to baseline Project 97 icebreakers, these two vessels were fitted with additional scientific facilities, echosounders to conduct hydrographic survey, and accommodation for an additional 14 personnel. However, they were also used for icebreaking operations from time to time.

Name(s)	Namesake(s)	IMO number	Yard number	Laid down	Launched	Completed	In service	Status or fate	Image	Ref
Prabhavi (1997); Pyotr Pakhtusov (Russian: Пётр Пахтусов; 1975–1997); Mendeleev (Russian: Менделеев; 1971–1975); Pyotr Pakhtusov (Russian: Пётр Пахтусов; 1966–1971); Ledokol-10 (Russian: Ледокол-10; 1966)	Pyotr Pakhtusov; Dmitri Mendeleev	6614358	774	21 May 1966	8 August 1966	30 December 1966	1966–1997	Broken up		
Georgiy Sedov (Russian: Георгий Седов)	Georgiy Sedov	7117137	776	3 January 1967	15 June 1967	30 December 1967	1967–1992	Broken up		

== Derivative designs ==
=== Project 97B ===
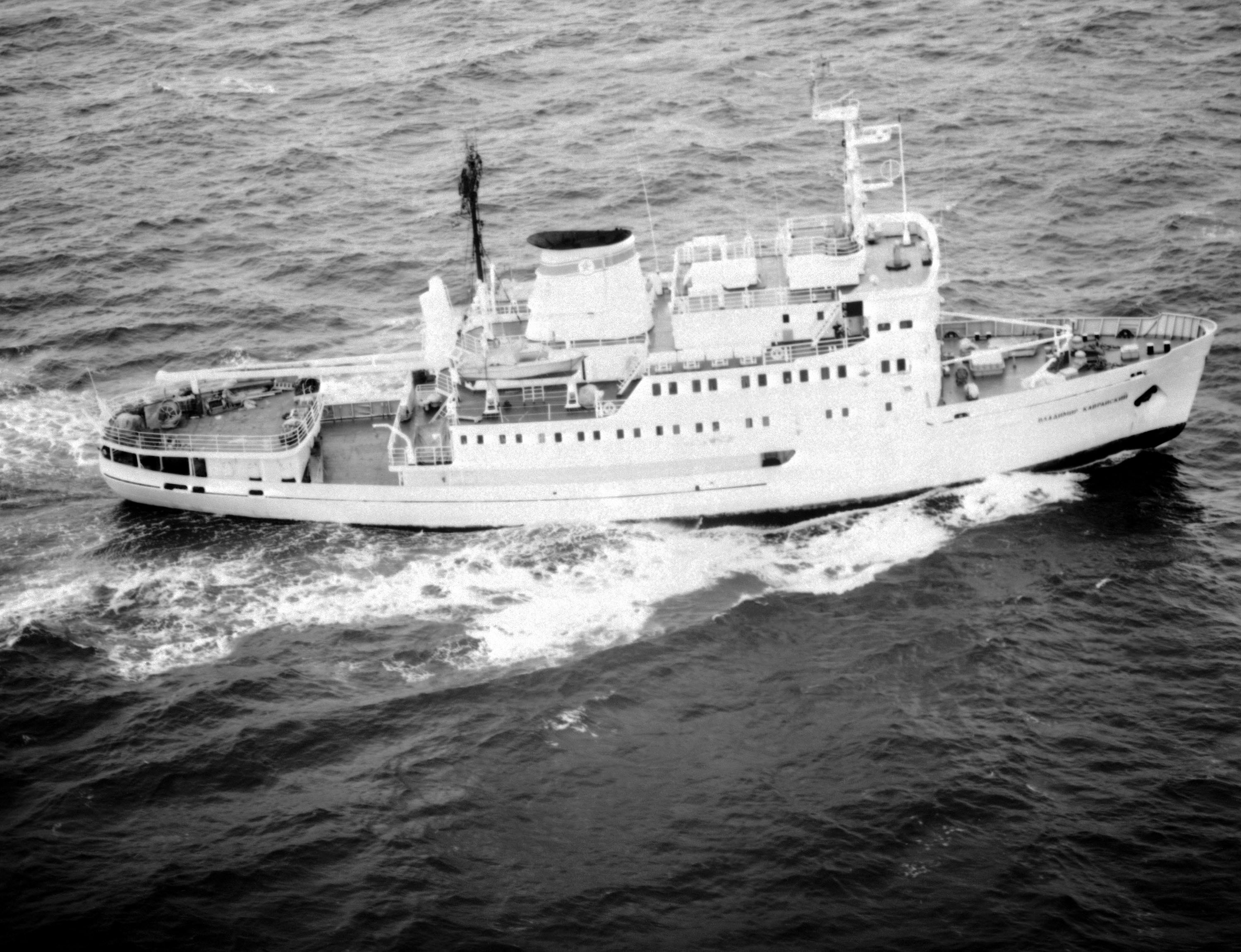
Vladimir Kavrayskiy, the sole Project 97B hydrographic survey vessel

Project 97B (Russian: 97Б) was a hydrographic survey vessel variant built for the Hydrographic Office of the Soviet Navy. Unlike the preceding Project 97D built for civilian service, Project 97B was a more radical departure from the original Project 97 icebreaker design with increased length and displacement to increase range and endurance, as well as an enlarged deckhouse to accommodate more personnel on board.

As of 2024, Vladimir Kavrayskiy remains in service with the Northern Fleet as the stationary barracks ship PKZ-86 in Murmansk.

=== Project 97P ===
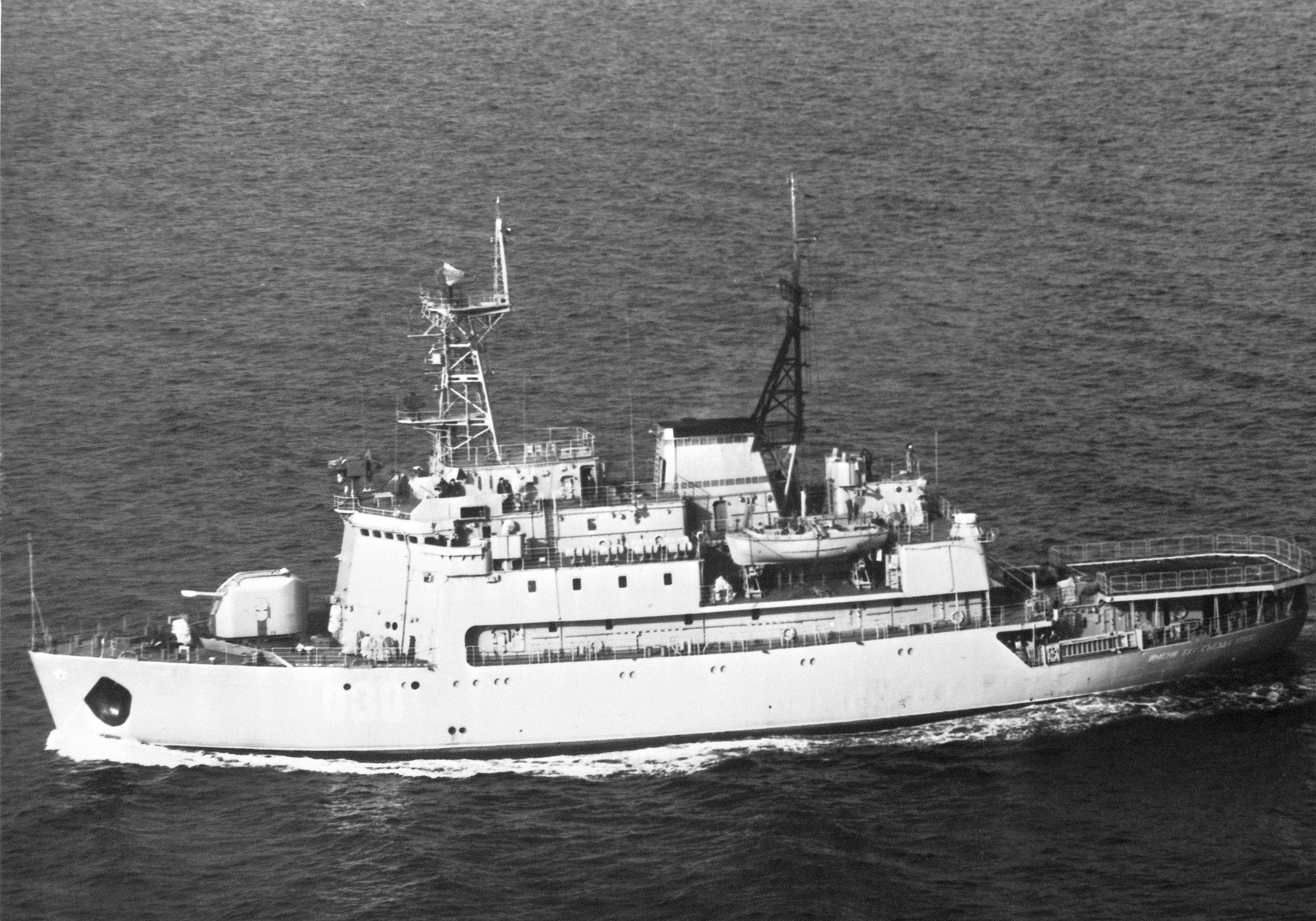
Imeni XXV syezda KPSS, one of eight Project 97P icebreaking patrol ships built for the Soviet Navy and Soviet Border Troops

Project 97P (Russian: 97П) was developed as a response to the renewed interest of the Soviet Navy and Soviet Border Troops on icebreaking patrol ships after United States Coast Guard and Canadian Coast Guard icebreakers began appearing more frequently near the country's northern maritime borders. New icebreaking patrol ships were needed because existing Soviet naval vessels could not operate in ice-covered waters and large icebreakers, in addition to being unarmed and operated by civilians, could not be distracted from their primary mission of escorting merchant ships. Central Design Bureau "Iceberg" selected Project 97 as the design basis following positive operational experience and the difficulties associated with developing a new design.

As of 2024, four Project 97P patrol ships remain in service: Ivan Susanin with the Pacific Fleet and Ruslan with the Northern Fleet, both with their armaments removed, and Neva and Volga with the FSB Border Service.

=== Project 97N ===
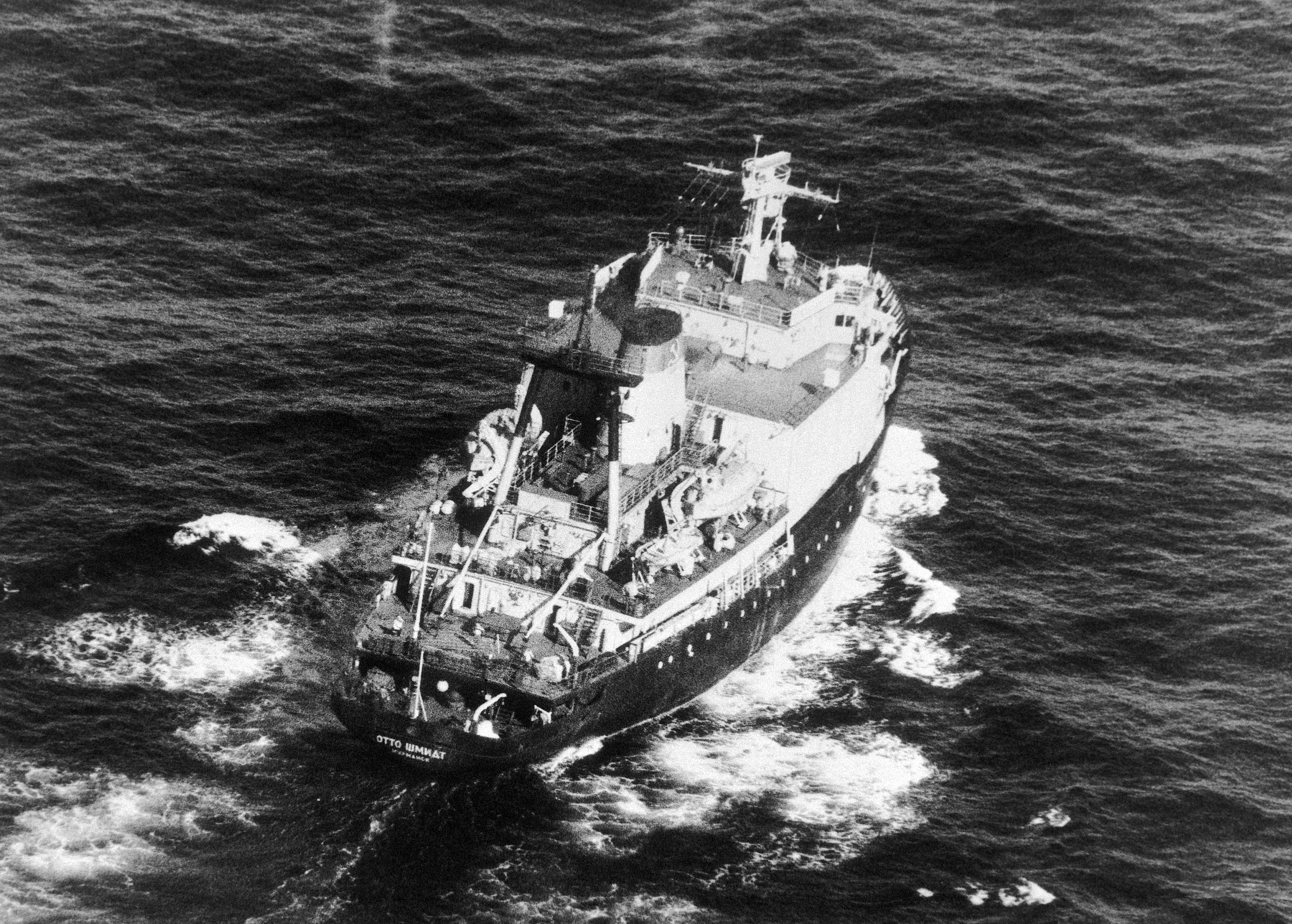
Otto Schmidt, the only Project 97N research vessel

Project 97N (Russian: 97Н), the final variant developed based on the Project 97 icebreaker design, was a research vessel commissioned by the State Committee for Hydrometeorology and Environmental Control of the Soviet Union to conduct scientific research in the poorly-studied transition zone between open water and the polar ice pack. In addition to adding extensive scientific facilities and additional accommodation, the hull lines were given more pronounced sheer and flare to reduce the likelihood of waves breaking over the bow.

The only Project 97N ship, Otto Schmidt, was in service in 1979–1991, and was sold for scrap in 1996.
