= Eisbär (1941 icebreaker) =

German icebreaker

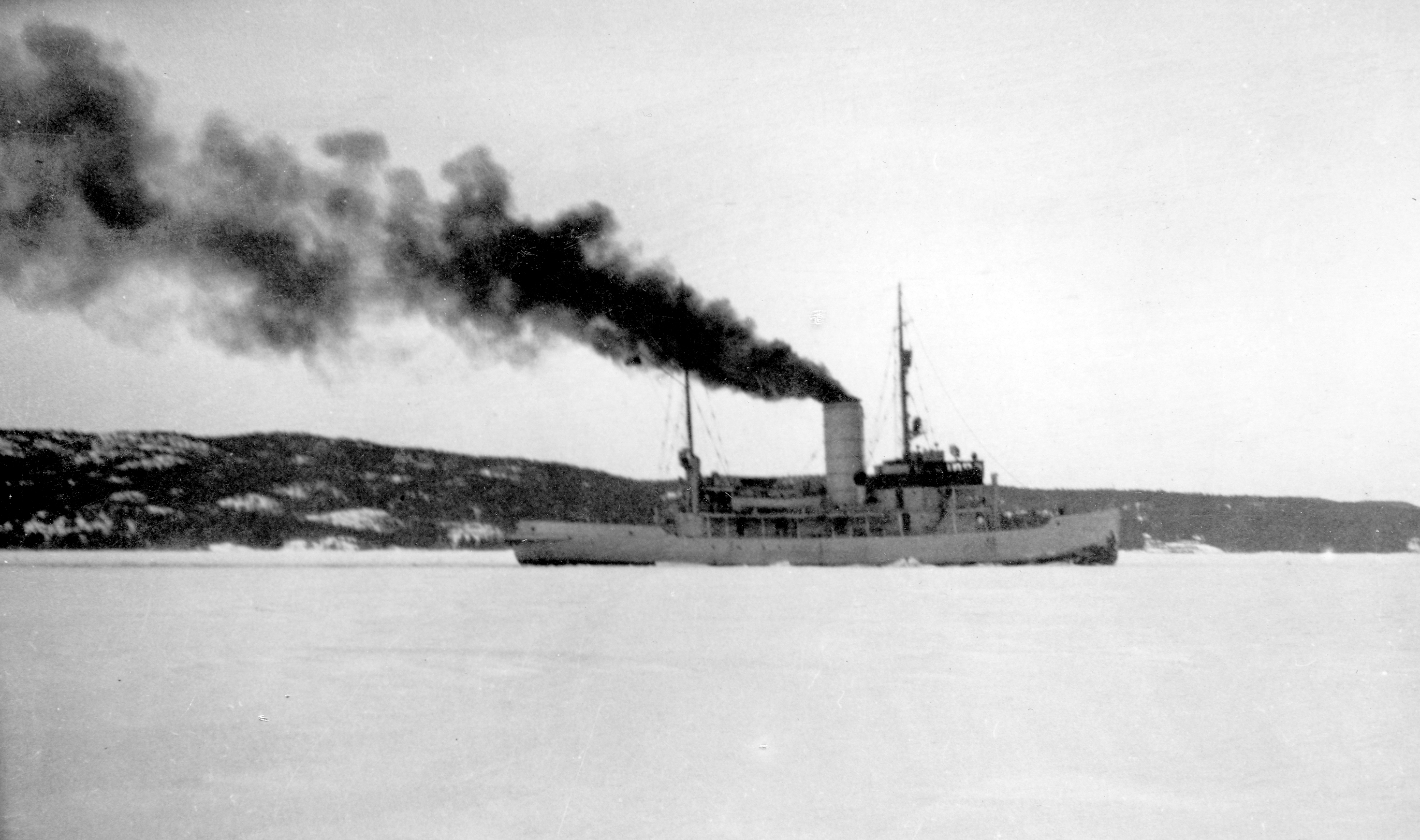
- Eisbär photographed in Frierfjord in 1942

History

Nazi Germany
- Name: Eisbär
- Namesake: German for polar bear
- Operator: Kriegsmarine
- Builder: Eriksbergs Mekaniska Verkstad, Gothenburg, Sweden
- Yard number: 319
- Launched: 20 October 1941
- Commissioned: 1 February 1942
- In service: 1942–1945
- Fate: Handed over to the Soviet Union as war reparations in 1946

Soviet Union
- Name: Ilya Muromets (Илья Муромец)
- Namesake: Ilya Muromets, Russian folk hero
- Operator: Soviet Navy (1946–1957); Far East Shipping Company (1957–1979)
- Port of registry: Vladivostok, Soviet Union (since 1957)
- Acquired: 1946
- In service: 1946–1979
- Identification: IMO number: 6805000; Call sign: UPXG
- Fate: Broken up in 1981

General characteristics
- Type: Icebreaker
- Length: 56.9 m (187 ft)
- Beam: 15 m (49 ft)
- Draught: 6.35 m (21 ft)
- Installed power: Two triple-expansion steam engines
- Propulsion: Bow and stern propellers

Eisbär was a steam-powered Kriegsmarine port icebreaker built at Eriksbergs Mekaniska Verkstad in Gothenburg, Sweden, in 1942. She had two triple-expansion steam engines driving one propeller in the stern and another in the bow of the vessel.

In 1946, Eisbär was handed over to the Soviet Union as war reparations and renamed Ilya Muromets after the Russian folk hero. She was first used by the Soviet Navy until 1957 and afterwards as a port icebreaker in Vladivostok by the Far Eastern Shipping Company until 1979. Ilya Muromets was broken up in 1981.

In the 1950s, the hull form of Ilya Muromets was used as the basis for the development of the diesel-electric Dobrynya Nikitich-class icebreakers.
