= CCGS Captain Molly Kool =

Canadian Coast Guard icebreaker

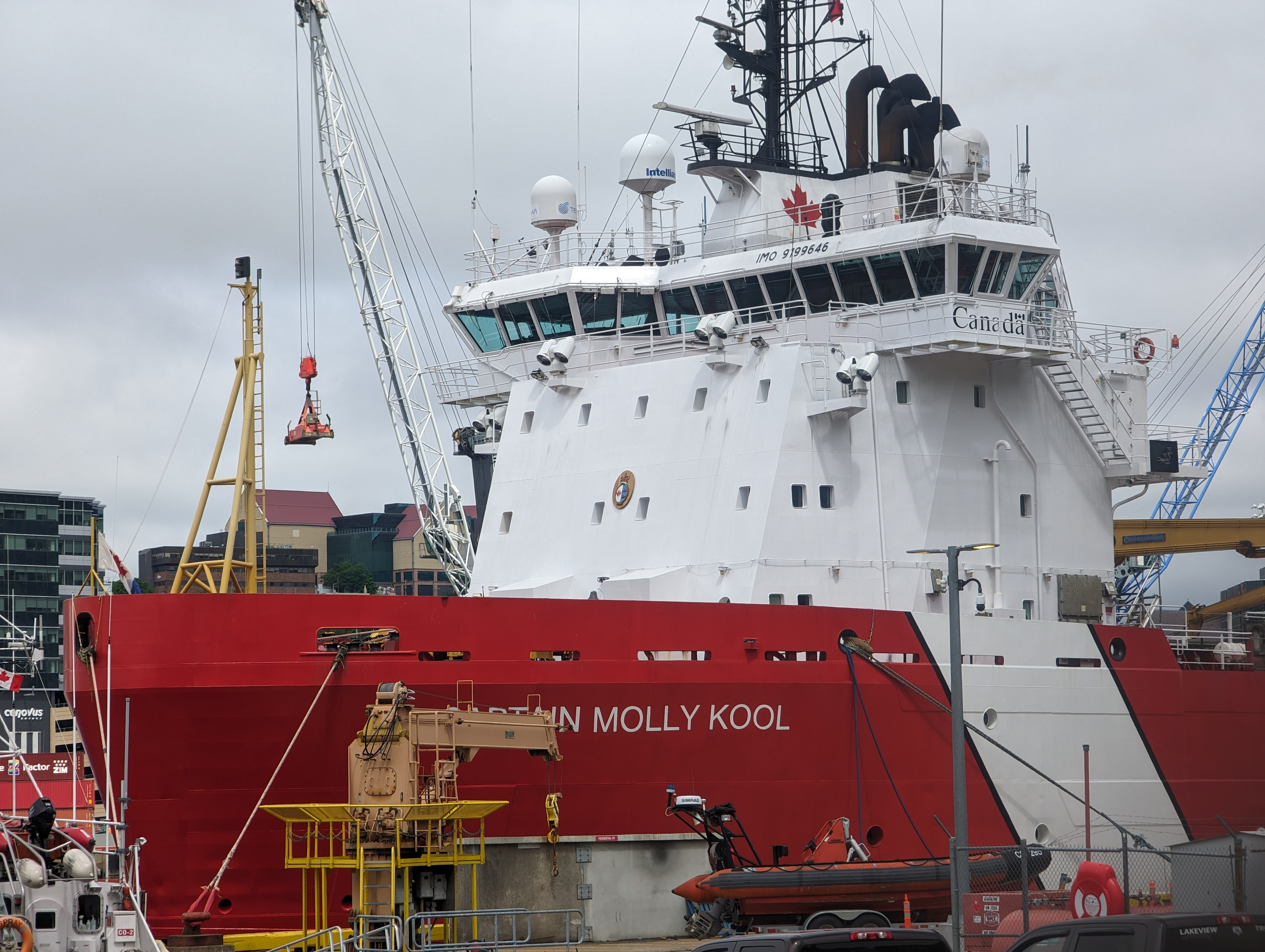
- Docked in St. John's Harbour in 2023

History

Sweden
- Name: Vidar Viking
- Owner: Trans Viking Icebreaking & Offshore
- Port of registry: Skärhamn, Sweden (2001–2012); Kholmsk, Russia (2012–2016); DIS, Denmark (2016–2017); Mandal, Norway (2017–2018)
- Builder: Havyard Leirvik, Leirvik, Norway
- Yard number: 284
- Laid down: 14 December 1999
- Launched: 25 November 2000
- Completed: 16 February 2001
- In service: 2001–2018
- Fate: Sold to Canada in 2018

Canada
- Name: CCGS Captain Molly Kool
- Namesake: Molly Kool
- Owner: Canadian Coast Guard
- Acquired: 14 December 2018
- Commissioned: 30 May 2019
- In service: 2019–present
- Home port: CCG Base St John's (Newfoundland and Labrador Region)
- Identification: IMO number: 9199646; Call sign: VAAE
- Status: In service

General characteristics (as built)
- Type: Icebreaker, Anchor handling tug supply vessel
- Tonnage: 3,382 GT; 1,145 NT; 2,600 DWT
- Displacement: 6,872 tons (maximum)
- Length: 83.7 m (275 ft)
- Beam: 18 m (59 ft)
- Draught: 6.5 m (21 ft) (icebreaking); 7.22 m (24 ft) (maximum)
- Depth: 8.5 m (28 ft)
- Ice class: DNV ICE-10 Icebreaker
- Installed power: 2 × MaK 8M32 (2 × 3,840 kW); 2 × MaK 6M32 (2 × 2,880 kW)
- Propulsion: 2 × ducted controllable pitch propellers; 2 × bow thrusters (one fixed, one retractable and azimuthing) and one stern thruster
- Speed: 16 knots (30 km/h; 18 mph) (maximum); 12 knots (22 km/h; 14 mph) (service); 3 knots (5.6 km/h; 3.5 mph) in 1 m (3 ft) level ice
- Crew: 23

General characteristics (after conversion)
- Type: Medium icebreaker (CCG)
- Ice class: CASPPR Arctic Class 2; Polar Class 4
- Speed: 11 knots (20 km/h; 13 mph) (service)
- Range: 11,000 nautical miles (20,000 km; 13,000 mi)
- Endurance: 42 days
- Crew: 19 (9 officers, 10 crew)
- Notes: Otherwise same as above

CCGS Captain Molly Kool is a Canadian Coast Guard converted medium class icebreaker. She was originally built as an icebreaking anchor handling tug Vidar Viking for Trans Viking Icebreaking & Offshore in 2001. The vessel was acquired by the Canadian Coast Guard in August 2018 and was commissioned in May of the next year after refit. She is named after the Canadian sailor, Molly Kool.

CCGS Captain Molly Kool has two sister vessels, CCGS Jean Goodwill and CCGS Vincent Massey, both of which are converted offshore vessels.

== Design ==
CCGS Captain Molly Kool is 83.7 metres (275 ft) long overall and 77.77 metres (255 ft) between perpendiculars. Her hull has a beam of 18 metres (59 ft) and moulded depth of 8.5 metres (28 ft). At design draught, she draws 6.5 metres (21 ft) of water, but can be loaded to a maximum draught of 7.22 metres (24 ft) which corresponds to a displacement of 6,872 tons. Originally built to DNV ice class "ICE-10 Icebreaker", her hull structures and propulsion system will be upgraded to Polar Class 4 level and the vessel will be rated as Arctic Class 2 in Canadian service. Originally she was served by a crew of 23, but this has been reduced to 19 (9 officers and 10 crew) when the vessel was acquired by the Canadian Coast Guard.

CCGS Captain Molly Kool has four medium-speed diesel engines geared to two controllable pitch propellers in nozzles. She has two eight-cylinder MaK 8M32 and two six-cylinder MaK 6M32 diesel engines rated at 3,840 kW (5,150 hp) and 2,880 kW (3,860 hp) each. With a total propulsion power of 13,440 kW (18,020 hp), she can achieve a maximum speed of 16 knots (30 km/h; 18 mph) in open water and break 1-metre (3.3 ft) ice at a continuous speed of 3 knots (5.6 km/h; 3.5 mph). In addition, she has two bow thrusters (one fixed, one retractable and azimuthing) and one transverse stern thruster for maneuvering and dynamic positioning.

== Career ==
=== Vidar Viking (2001–2018) ===
In 2004, Vidar Viking acted as the drillship for the Arctic Coring Expedition (ACEX) in the high Arctic. The vessel remained on location in the multi-year polar ice pack for nine days while being supported by the Swedish icebreaker Oden and the Russian nuclear-powered icebreaker Sovetskiy Soyuz. During the expedition, the ship stopped at the North Pole.

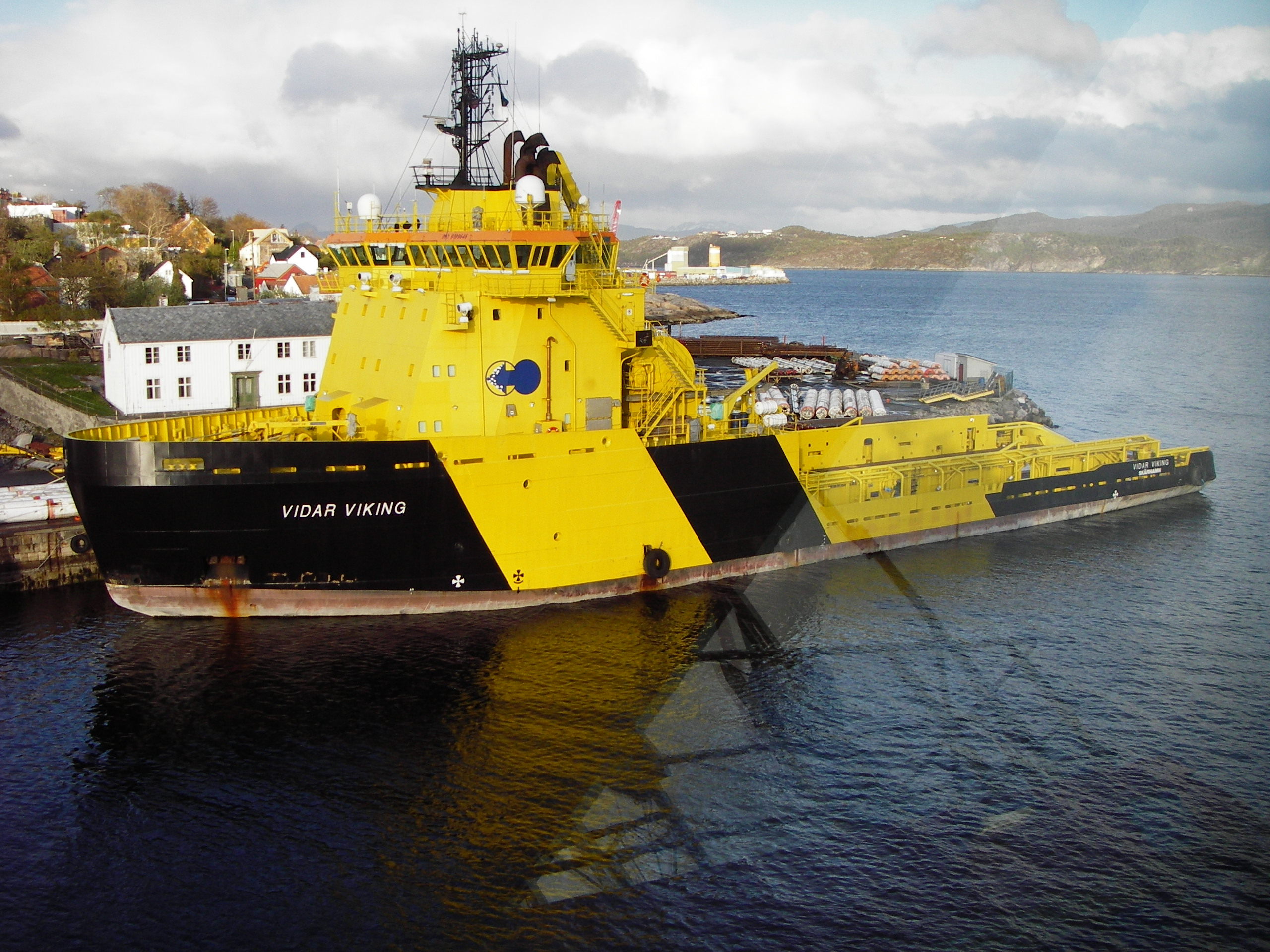
Vidar Viking in Kristiansund, Norway, May 2005

In late January 2010, the Swedish Maritime Administration called for Vidar Viking and Tor Viking to serve as icebreakers in the Baltic Sea. The vessels were chartered on a contingency basis — where Trans Viking's parent company, Transatlantic, receives a basic flat fee for the vessels to be available within ten days, without regard to whether they were used. Their previous usage was in 2007. The contract expired in 2015.

In February 2010 Balder Viking, Vidar Viking and Loke Viking were chartered by Edinburgh-based oil company Cairn Energy for four months, starting in June 2010, for drilling operations in Baffin Bay.

In 2012, the Swedish Maritime Administration agreed to end the charter for Vidar Viking prematurely for the 2011–2012 Baltic Sea icebreaking season and all subsequent seasons. The vessel then provided icebreaking services for the Estonian Maritime Administration for one winter season before heading to Sakhalin where she provided icebreaking, supply and anchor handling services starting from summer 2012 for Sakhalin Energy Investment Company Limited. After six months, she was reflagged to Russia and her crew changed to Russians. Vidar Viking was reflagged to Danish International Register of Shipping in 2016 and to Norway in 2017.

=== CCGS Captain Molly Kool (2018–present) ===
In 2016, Chantier Davie Canada began offering Vidar Viking and her sister ships as a replacement to the ageing Canadian Coast Guard icebreakers under the moniker Project Resolute. In addition to the three Swedish icebreaking offshore vessels, the offer also included a fourth slightly bigger and more powerful vessel, the US-flagged Aiviq. In August 2018, Chantier Davie Canada was awarded a Can$610 million dollar contract for the acquisition and refitting of the three vessels. On 10 August 2018, Viking Supply Ships announced the sale of its three vessels to Her Majesty the Queen in Right of Canada for a profit of $274 million. Once retrofitted at Davie Shipbuilding, the vessels are expected to remain in service in the Canadian Coast Guard for 15 to 25 years.

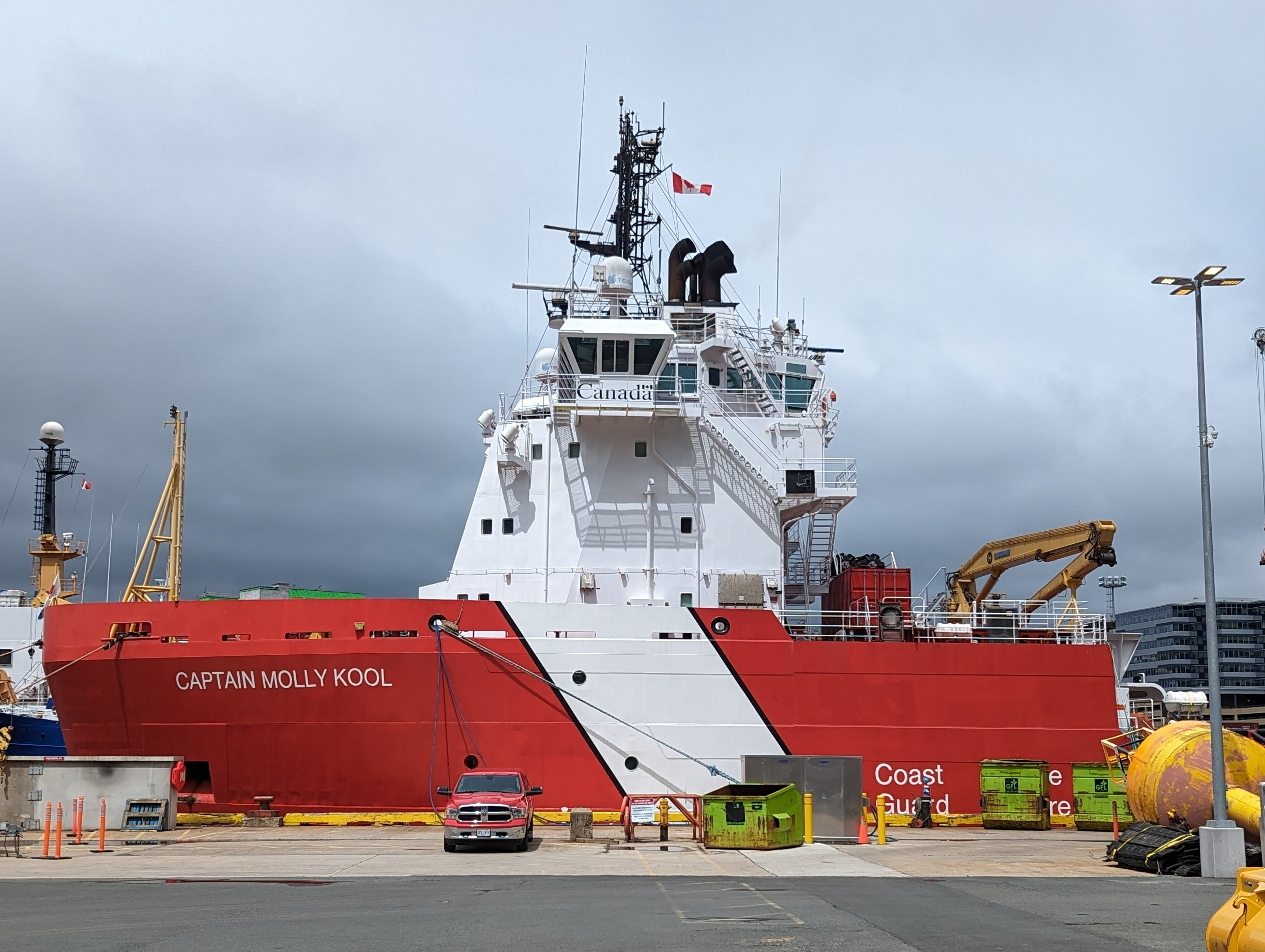
Captain Molly Kool in St. John's, Canada, in July 2023

The vessel was the first to be ready to undertake Coast Guard missions. She had been repainted in Coast Guard livery on 13 November 2018. Some of the modifications the Coast Guard plans for the vessel, and her sister ships, were deferred, so that she could be employed ice-breaking in the St Lawrence estuary during the winter of 2019. In particular, one highly visible deferred item will be the addition of a landing pad and hangar for a light utility helicopter.

CCGS Captain Molly Kool was named after Captain Molly Kool (1916–2009), born in Alma, New Brunswick, who was the first female licensed ship captain in North America. She was also the first female deep sea Captain in North America. At the time, she was only the second woman in the world to hold that achievement. Having grown up spending her summers sailing with her father in waters in and around the Bay of Fundy, Molly learned about life at sea and became an accomplished sailor. After high school, Molly convinced the Merchant Marine School in Saint John, New Brunswick to admit her as a student. She would obtain her Mate's certificate in 1937. In 1939, she obtained her coastal Master's Certificate and graduated from the Merchant Marine Institute in Yarmouth, Nova Scotia.

On 22 March 2019, Captain Molly Kool and CCGS Louis S. St-Laurent were dispatched to aid the tanker Jana Desgagnes which had damaged a rudder in heavy ice 16 nautical miles (30 km; 18 mi) southwest of Port-aux-Basques, Newfoundland. Captain Molly Kool towed the vessel further out to sea to await the arrival of a tugboat, which would take the tanker to Sydney, Nova Scotia for repairs. During the operation, Captain Molly Kool used her towing notch, a feature not present in other CCG icebreakers currently in service, to escort the stricken tanker through the ice.

CCGS Captain Molly Kool was officially commissioned into Canadian Coast Guard fleet on 30 May 2019.
