= CCGS Jean Goodwill =

Canadian Coast Guard icebreaker

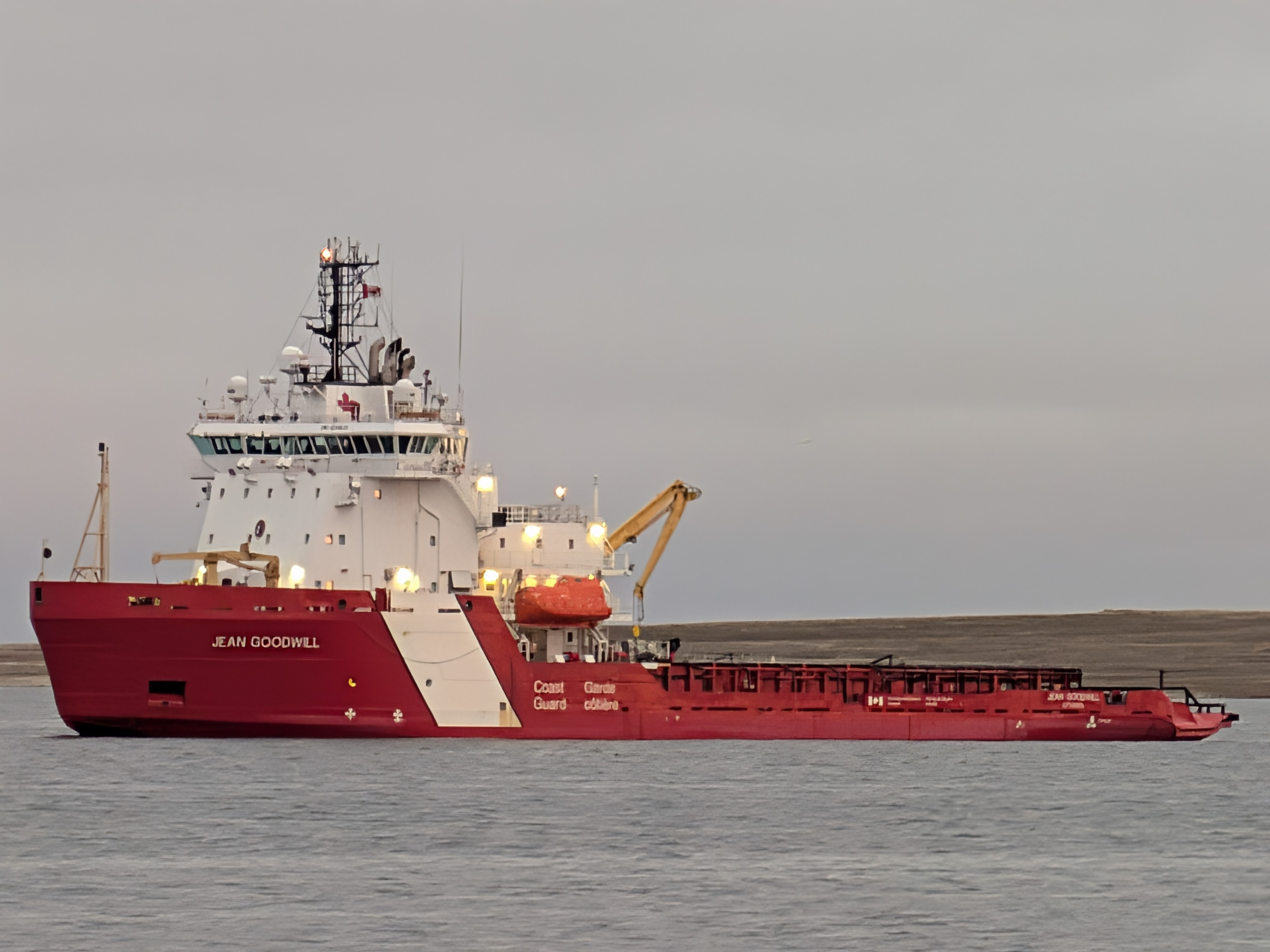
- Jean Goodwill in Cambridge Bay, 2025

History
- Name: Balder Viking
- Owner: Trans Viking Icebreaking & Offshore AS
- Port of registry: Skärhamn, (Sweden) (2000–2017); Mandal, (Norway) (2017–2018)
- Builder: Havyard Leirvik A.S., Leirvik, Norway
- Yard number: 283
- Laid down: 28 April 1999
- Launched: 26 April 2000
- Completed: 24 October 2000
- In service: 2000–2018
- Fate: Sold to Canada in 2018

Canada
- Name: CCGS Jean Goodwill
- Namesake: Jean Cuthand Goodwill
- Owner: Canadian Coast Guard
- Acquired: November 2020
- Commissioned: 25 August 2022
- Home port: CCG Base Dartmouth (Dartmouth, Nova Scotia)
- Identification: IMO number: 9199634
- Status: In service

General characteristics (as built)
- Type: Icebreaker, AHTS
- Tonnage: 3,382 GT; 1,145 NT; 2,424 DWT
- Length: 83.7 m (274 ft 7 in)
- Beam: 18 m (59 ft 1 in)
- Draught: 6.5 m (21 ft 4 in) (icebreaking); 7.242 m (23 ft 9.1 in) (maximum)
- Depth: 8.5 m (27 ft 11 in)
- Ice class: DNV ICE-10 Icebreaker
- Installed power: 2 × MaK 8M32 (2 × 3,840 kW); 2 × MaK 6M32 (2 × 2,880 kW)
- Propulsion: Two ducted controllable pitch propellers
- Speed: 16 knots (30 km/h; 18 mph) (maximum); 12 knots (22 km/h; 14 mph) (service)
- Crew: 23

General characteristics (after conversion)
- Type: Medium icebreaker (CCG)
- Ice class: CASPPR Arctic Class 3; Polar Class 4
- Speed: 11 knots (20 km/h; 13 mph) (service)
- Range: 11,000 nmi (20,000 km; 13,000 mi)
- Endurance: 42 days
- Crew: 21 (10 officers, 11 crew); 7 additional berths
- Notes: Otherwise same as above

CCGS Jean Goodwill is an icebreaking anchor handling tug supply vessel (AHTS) converted to a medium class icebreaker for the Canadian Coast Guard. She was originally built as Balder Viking for Trans Viking Icebreaking & Offshore AS in 2000. The vessel was sold to Canada in 2018 and was initially expected to enter service in late 2019 following a refit. However, due to delays the conversion of the vessel was not completed until November 2020.

CCGS Jean Goodwill has two sister vessels, CCGS Captain Molly Kool and CCGS Vincent Massey, both of which are converted offshore vessels.

== Design ==
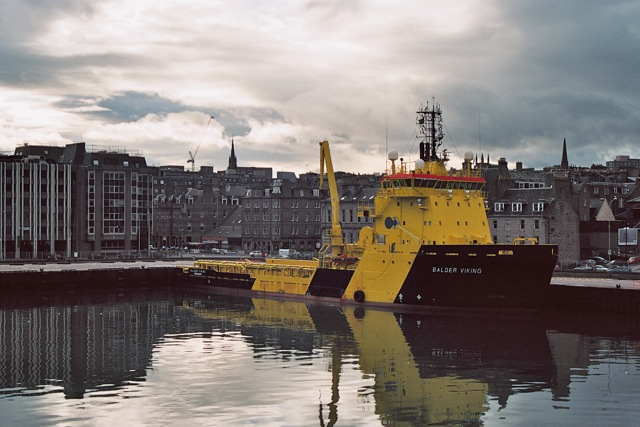
Balder Viking in Aberdeen

CCGS Jean Goodwill is 83.7 metres (274 ft 7 in) long overall and 77.77 metres (255 ft 2 in) between perpendiculars. Her hull has a beam of 18 metres (59 ft 1 in) and moulded depth of 8.5 metres (27 ft 11 in). At design draught, she draws 6.5 metres (21 ft 4 in) of water, but can be loaded to a maximum draught of 7.22 metres (23 ft 8 in) which corresponds to a displacement of 6,872 tons. Originally built to DNV ice class "ICE-10 Icebreaker", her hull structures and propulsion system will be upgraded to Polar Class 4 level and the vessel will be rated as Arctic Class 3 in Canadian service. Originally she was served by a crew of 23, but this will be reduced to 19 (9 officers and 10 crew) when the vessel is commissioned by the Canadian Coast Guard. There are also 9 additional berths.

Jean Goodwill has four medium-speed diesel engines geared to two controllable pitch propellers in nozzles. She has two eight-cylinder MaK 8M32 and two six-cylinder MaK 6M32 diesel engines rated at 3,840 kW (5,150 hp) and 2,880 kW (3,860 hp) each. With a total propulsion power of 13,440 kW (18,020 hp), she can achieve a maximum speed of 16 knots (30 km/h; 18 mph) in open water and break 1-metre (3.3 ft) ice at a continuous speed of 3 knots (5.6 km/h; 3.5 mph). In addition, she has two bow thrusters (one fixed, one retractable and azimuthing) and one transverse stern thruster for maneuvering and dynamic positioning.

== Career ==
=== Balder Viking (2000–2018) ===
She has been employed supplying offshore arctic petroleum drilling expedition.

In February 2010 Balder Viking, Vidar Viking and Loke Viking were chartered by Edinburgh-based oil company Cairn Energy UK PLC for four months, starting in June 2010, for drilling operations in Baffin Bay.

=== CCGS Jean Goodwill (2020–present) ===
In 2016, Chantier Davie Canada began offering Balder Viking and her sister ships as a replacement to the ageing Canadian Coast Guard icebreakers under the moniker Project Resolute. In addition to the three Swedish icebreaking offshore vessels, the offer also included a fourth slightly bigger and more powerful vessel, the US-flagged Aiviq. In August 2018, Chantier Davie Canada was awarded a Can$610 million dollar contract for the acquisition and refitting of the three vessels. On 10 August 2018, Viking Supply Ships announced the sale of its three vessels to Her Majesty the Queen in Right of Canada for a profit of $274 million. Once retrofitted at Davie Shipbuilding, the vessels are expected to remain in service in the Canadian Coast Guard for 15 to 25 years.

Balder Viking was renamed CCGS Jean Goodwill after Jean Cuthand Goodwill (1928–1997), a Canadian Cree nurse who, in 1954, became Saskatchewan's first Aboriginal woman to finish a nursing program. The vessel was delivered to the Canadian Coast Guard fleet in November 2020 and officially commissioned in August 2022.
