= CCGS Vincent Massey =

Canadian Coast Guard icebreaker

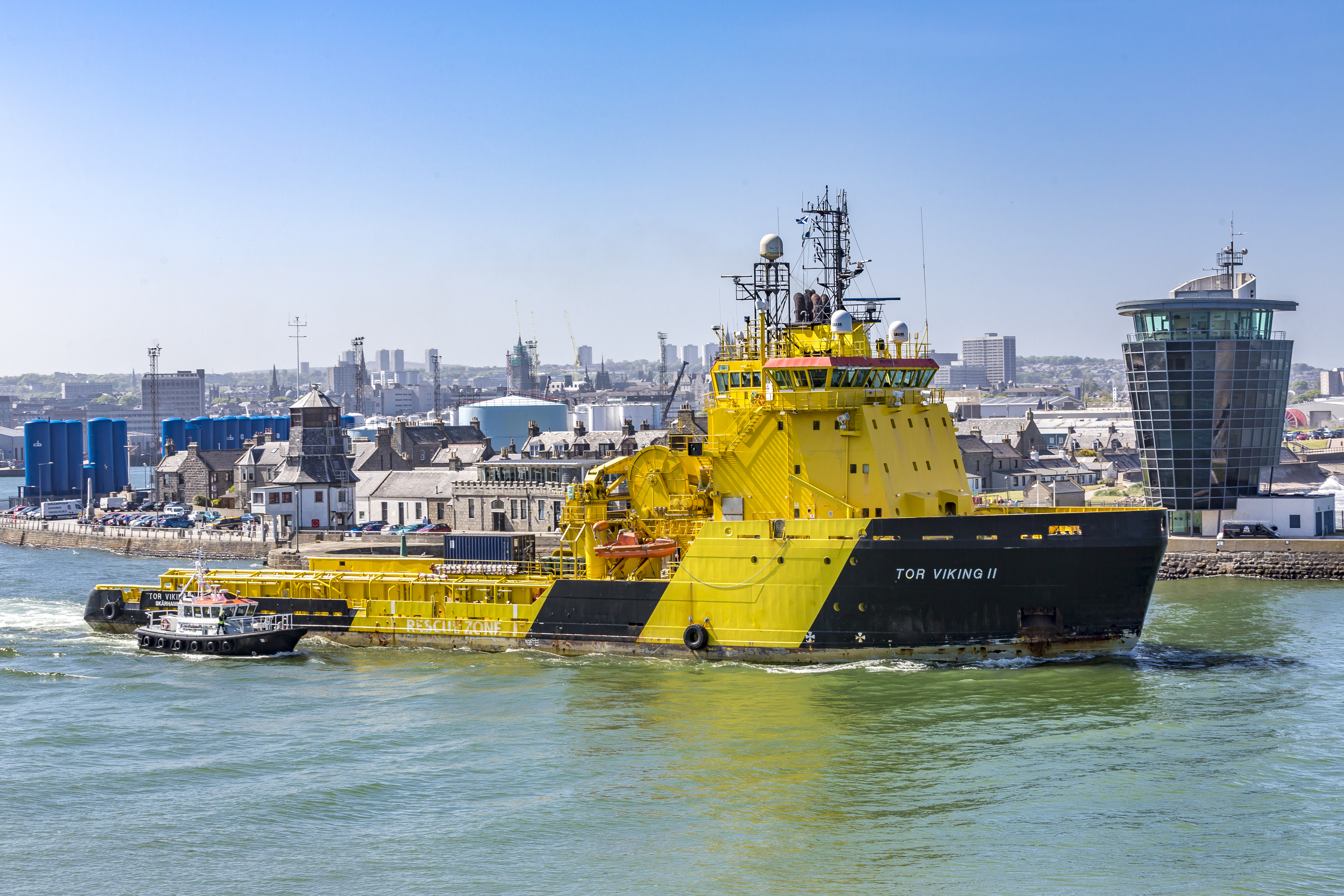
- As Tor Viking II in June 2016

History

Sweden
- Name: Tor Viking (2000–2003); Tor Viking II (2003–2017); Tor Viking (2017–2018)
- Owner: Trans Viking Icebreaking & Offshore AS (2000–2018); Davie Shipbuilding (2018–2022)
- Port of registry: Norway (2000–2003); Skärhamn, Sweden (2003–2017); Mandal, Norway (2017–2018)
- Ordered: 1 October 1998
- Builder: Havyard Leirvik A.S., Leirvik, Norway
- Yard number: 282
- Laid down: 1 January 1999
- Launched: 20 November 1999
- Completed: 1 March 2000
- In service: 2000–2018
- Fate: Sold to Canada in 2018

Canada
- Name: Vincent Massey
- Namesake: Charles Vincent Massey
- Operator: Canadian Coast Guard
- Acquired: 17 October 2022
- Commissioned: 11 September 2023
- In service: 2023–present
- Identification: IMO number: 9199622
- Status: In service

General characteristics (as built)
- Type: Icebreaker, AHTS
- Tonnage: 3,382 GT; 1,273 NT; 2,600 DWT
- Length: 83.7 m (274 ft 7 in)
- Beam: 18 m (59 ft 1 in)
- Draught: 7.0 m (23 ft 0 in) (icebreaking); 7.242 m (23 ft 9.1 in) (maximum)
- Depth: 8.5 m (27 ft 11 in)
- Ice class: DNV ICE-10 Icebreaker
- Installed power: 2 × MaK 8M32 (2 × 3,840 kW); 2 × MaK 6M32 (2 × 2,880 kW)
- Propulsion: Two ducted controllable pitch propellers
- Speed: 16 knots (30 km/h; 18 mph) (maximum); 12 knots (22 km/h; 14 mph) (service)
- Crew: 23

General characteristics (after conversion)
- Type: Medium icebreaker (CCG)
- Ice class: CASPPR Arctic Class 2; Polar Class 4
- Speed: 11 knots (20 km/h; 13 mph) (service)
- Range: 11,000 nmi (20,000 km; 13,000 mi)
- Endurance: 42 days
- Crew: 9 officers; 10 crew
- Notes: Otherwise same as above; data for CCGS Captain Molly Kool

CCGS Vincent Massey is an icebreaking anchor handling tug supply vessel (AHTS) converted to a medium class icebreaker for the Canadian Coast Guard. She was originally built as Tor Viking for Trans Viking Icebreaking & Offshore AS in 2000 and has also traded under the name Tor Viking II. The vessel was sold to Canada in 2018 and was initially expected to enter service in summer 2020 following a refit. However, the conversion work was delayed and the vessel was delivered to the Canadian Coast Guard in October 2022 and dedicated to service in September 2023.

CCGS Vincent Massey has two sister vessels, CCGS Captain Molly Kool and CCGS Jean Goodwill, both of which are converted offshore vessels.

== Design ==
CCGS Vincent Massey is 83.7 metres (274 ft 7 in) long overall and 77.77 metres (255 ft 2 in) between perpendiculars. Her hull has a beam of 18 metres (59 ft 1 in) and moulded depth of 8.5 metres (27 ft 11 in). At design draught, she draws 6.5 metres (21 ft 4 in) of water, but can be loaded to a maximum draught of 7.22 metres (23 ft 8 in) which corresponds to a displacement of 6,872 tons. Originally built to DNV ice class "ICE-10 Icebreaker", her hull structures and propulsion system will be upgraded to Polar Class 4 level and the vessel will be rated as Arctic Class 2 in Canadian service. Originally she was served by a crew of 13, but this will be increased to 19 (9 officers and 10 crew) when the vessel is commissioned by the Canadian Coast Guard.

Vincent Massey has four medium-speed diesel engines geared to two controllable pitch propellers in nozzles. She has two eight-cylinder MaK 8M32 and two six-cylinder MaK 6M32 diesel engines rated at 3,840 kW (5,150 hp) and 2,880 kW (3,860 hp) each. With a total propulsion power of 13,440 kW (18,020 hp), she can achieve a maximum speed of 16 knots (30 km/h; 18 mph) in open water and break 1-metre (3.3 ft) ice at a continuous speed of 3 knots (5.6 km/h; 3.5 mph). In addition, she has two bow thrusters (one fixed, one retractable and azimuthing) and one transverse stern thruster for maneuvering and dynamic positioning.

== Career ==
=== Tor Viking and Tor Viking II (2000–2018) ===
She has been employed supplying offshore Arctic petroleum drilling expedition.

From 2003 to 2017, the vessel was named Tor Viking II because the Swedish ship registry does not allow two ships sharing a name.

In late January 2010 the Swedish Maritime Administration called for Vidar Viking and Tor Viking to serve as icebreakers in the Baltic Sea. The vessels were chartered on a contingency basis; Trans Viking's parent company, Transatlantic, is paid a basic flat fee for the vessels to be available, within ten days, without regard to whether they are used. They were used in 2007. The contract expired in 2015.

In October 2015, Tor Viking rescued a French sailor and his cat from the 30-foot (9.1 m) sailboat La Chimere which had lost its rudder and rigging in heavy seas 400 miles (640 km) south of Cold Bay, Alaska. When Tor Viking arrived alongside in 20-foot (6 m) seas, the man jumped over the icebreaker's railing with the cat tucked in his shirt. The rescue was captured on video by a United States Coast Guard Lockheed C-130 Hercules monitoring the operation.

In December 2015, Tor Viking became the first ship to transit the Northern Sea Route in December without support from nuclear-powered icebreakers at this time of the year. The vessel entered Bering Strait on 28 November and passed around the northern tip of Novaya Zemlya on 10 December.

=== CCGS Vincent Massey (2022–present) ===
In 2016, Chantier Davie Canada began offering Tor Viking and her sister ships as a replacement to the ageing Canadian Coast Guard icebreakers under the moniker "Project Resolute". In addition to the three Swedish icebreaking offshore vessels, the offer also included a fourth slightly bigger and more powerful vessel, the US-flagged Aiviq. In August 2018, Chantier Davie Canada was awarded a Can$610 million dollar contract for the acquisition and refitting of the three vessels. On 10 August 2018, Viking Supply Ships announced the sale of its three vessels to Canada for a profit of $274 million. Once retrofitted at Davie Shipbuilding, the vessels are expected to remain in service in the Canadian Coast Guard for 15 to 25 years.

Tor Viking was named CCGS Vincent Massey after Charles Vincent Massey (1887–1967), a Canadian lawyer and diplomat who served as the Governor General of Canada, the 18th since Confederation and the first one born in Canada. The vessel was dedicated to Canadian service on 11 September 2023.
