= Gordon Tootoosis =

Canadian First Nations actor (1941-2011)

Gordon Tootoosis CM
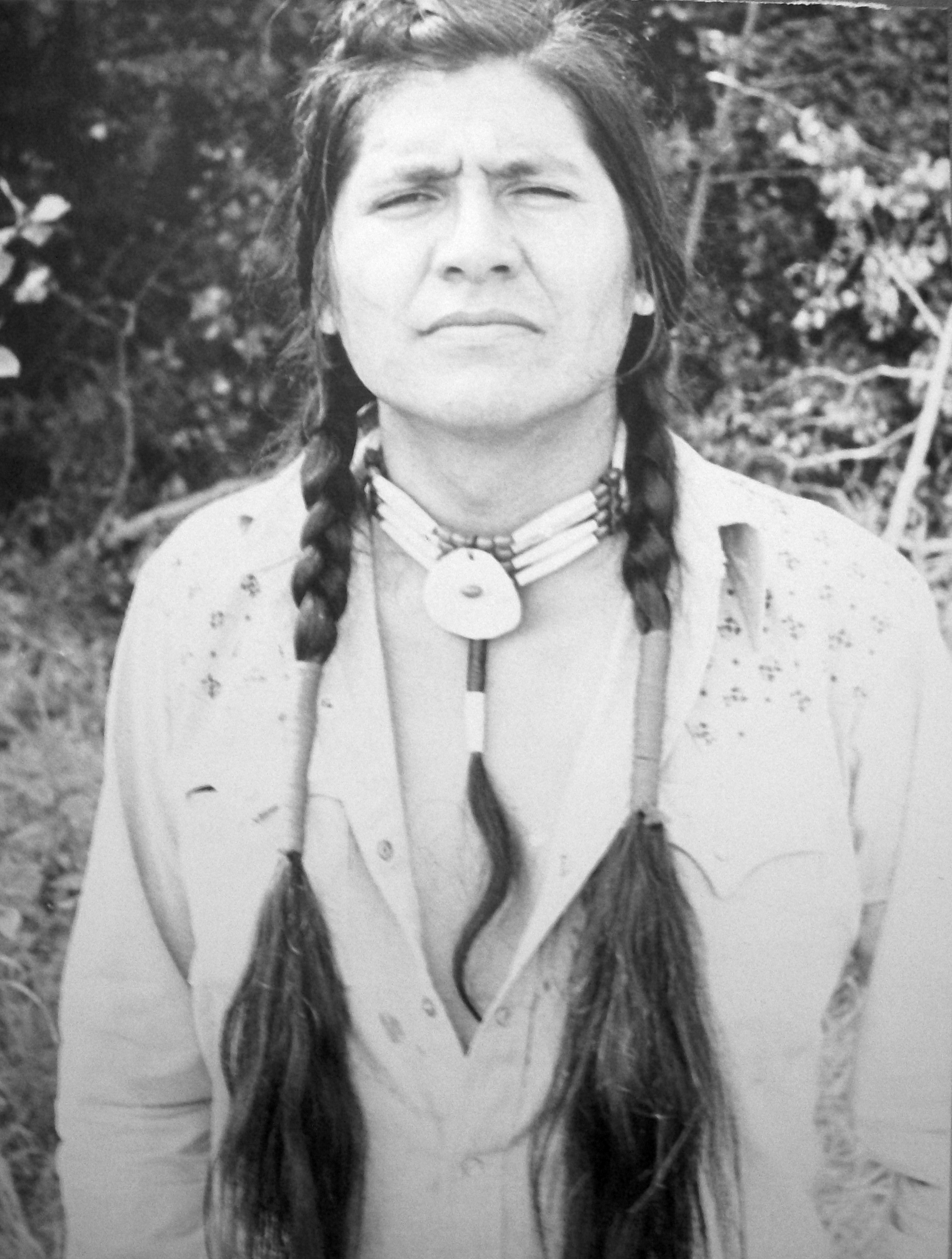
- Tootoosis in the 1970s
- Born: October 25, 1941; Poundmaker Reserve, Saskatchewan, Canada
- Died: July 5, 2011 (aged 69); Saskatoon, Saskatchewan, Canada
- Resting place: Poundmaker Reserve, Saskatchewan
- Occupation: Actor
- Years active: 1974–2011
- Spouse: Irene Seseequasis (m. 1965)
- Children: 6
- Relatives: Tyrone Tootoosis (nephew)

Gordon Tootoosis CM (October 25, 1941 – July 5, 2011) was a Canadian actor of Cree and Stoney descent. Tootoosis was a descendant of Yellow Mud Blanket, brother of the famous Cree leader Poundmaker. He was acclaimed for his commitment to preserving his culture and to telling his people's stories. He once said, "Leadership is about submission to duty, not elevation to power." He served as a founding member of the board of directors of the Saskatchewan Native Theatre Company. Tootoosis offered encouragement, support and training to aspiring Aboriginal actors. He served as a leading Cree activist both as a social worker and as a band chief. In Open Season and Boog and Elliot's Midnight Bun Run, Tootoosis was the voice of Sheriff Gordy.

He was awarded membership in the Order of Canada on October 29, 2004. The investiture ceremony took place on September 9, 2005. His citation recognizes him as an inspirational role model for Aboriginal youth. It notes that as a veteran actor, he portrayed memorable characters in movie and television productions in Canada and the United States.

== Career ==
His first acting role was in the film Alien Thunder (1974), alongside Chief Dan George and Donald Sutherland. He portrayed Albert Golo in 52 episodes of North of 60 in the 1990s. He is best known to British audiences for playing the Native American Joe Saugus, who negotiates the purchase of the Middlesbrough Transporter Bridge in Auf Wiedersehen, Pet series 3 (2002). Tootoosis appeared in the CBC Television mini-series By Way of the Stars with Eric Schweig as Black Thunder and Tantoo Cardinal as Franoise. He appeared in the award-winning movie Legends of the Fall (1994), and starred with Russell Means in Disney's Pocahontas (1995) and Song of Hiawatha (1997). In 1999, he and Tantoo Cardinal became founding members of the board of directors of the Saskatchewan Native Theatre Company. In 2011, he appeared in Gordon Winter at the Persephone Theatre in Saskatoon and Prairie Scene in Ottawa, his first stage role in 15 years.

Tootoosis won a Gemini Award for his work on the animated show Wapos Bay: The Series and was nominated twice for his work on North of 60.

== Personal life and death ==
Tootoosis was raised with his 13 siblings in the Plains Cree tradition until he was forced from his home; taking indigenous children away from their communities and into residential schools was Canadian government policy at the time. Tootoosis was placed in a Catholic residential school, where he was treated harshly and forbidden to speak his own language. His father John Tootoosis was an activist for aboriginal rights, which got young Gordon into trouble at school. After his traumatic school years, Tootoosis went into social work, specializing in work with children and young offenders. His interest in his own cultural traditions led him to become an accomplished native dancer and rodeo roper, and he toured with the Plains InterTribal Dance Troupe in the 1960s and 1970s throughout Canada, Europe and South America, becoming one of North America's most popular powwow announcers. His father was one of the founders of the National Indian Brotherhood and former head of the Federation of Saskatchewan Indian Nations (FSIN). Gordon himself served as the chief of his band and as a vice-president of FSIN. Tootoosis married Irene Seseequasis in 1965. They had three daughters, Glynis, Alanna and Disa, three sons, Lee, Winston Bear, and Clint. After their daughter Glynnis died of cancer in 1997, they took the responsibility of raising her four children in Saskatoon.

Tootoosis died on July 5, 2011, aged 69, after being hospitalized for pneumonia at St. Paul's Hospital in Saskatoon. His funeral and interment were held on the Poundmaker Cree Nation Reserve in Cut Knife. In 2015, the Saskatchewan Native Theatre Company changed its name to the Gordon Tootoosis Nīkānīwin Theatre Company in honour of Tootoosis.

== Selected filmography ==
- Alien Thunder (1974) as Almighty Voice
- Marie-Anne (1978) as Chief Many Horses
- The Mad Trapper (1978)
- Red Serge (1986, TV Series) as Sioux Chief / Chief Mighty Buffalo
- Stone Fox (1987, TV Movie) as Stone Fox
- Airwolf (1987, TV Series) as Charlie Rising Moon
- MacGyver (1988-1991, TV Series) as Phil Crow / Perry
- Friday the 13th: The Series (1989, TV Series) as Spotted Owl
- Black Robe (1991) as Old Aenons
- Leaving Normal (1992) as Hank Amaruk
- Call of the Wild (1992, TV Movie) as Charlie
- By Way of the Stars (1992-1993, TV Mini-Series) as The Cree Chief
- Spirit Rider (1993, TV Movie) as Joe Moon
- North of 60 (1992-1997, TV series) as Albert Golo
- Northern Exposure (1993, TV Series) as Ed's father, Pete
- Hawkeye (1994, TV Series) as Ravenoak
- Lonesome Dove: The Series (1994, TV Series) as Indian John
- Legends of the Fall (1994) as One Stab
- 500 Nations (1995, TV Mini-Series) (voice)
- Pocahontas (1995) as Kekata (voice)
- Pocahontas: The Legend (1995) as Chief Powhatan
- The X-Files (1996, TV Series) as Shaman
- Lone Star (1996) as Wesley Birdsong
- Crazy Horse (1996, TV Movie) as Akicita
- Alaska (1996) as Ben Quincy General Store
- Coyote Summer (1996) as Mopeah
- Four Directions: A Canoe for the Making (1996, TV Series)
- Keeping the Promise (1997, TV Movie) as Chief Saknis
- The Edge (1997) as Jack Hawk
- Song of Hiawatha (1997) as Iagoo
- Forgotten Warriors (1997, Short documentary) as Narrator
- The Gift of the Grandfathers (1997, TV Short documentary) as Narrator
- The Magnificent Seven (1998, TV Series) as Chief Ko-Je
- Que la lumière soit (1998) as Indian God
- Due South (1998, TV Series) as Tom Quinn
- Dead Man's Gun (1998, TV Series) as Charlie Three Claws
- Big Bear (1998, TV Mini-Series) as Chief Big Bear
- Lakota Moon (1999, TV Movie) as Rolling Thunder
- Reindeer Games (2000) as Old Governor
- Bear with Me (2000) as John Ours
- Nobody's Baby (2001) as Dog Havasu
- Zoe (2001) as Red Shirt
- The Doe Boy (2001) as Marvin
- Dream Storm: A North of 60 Mystery (2001, TV Movie) as Albert Golo
- Christmas at Wapos Bay (2002) as Mushom
- Auf Wiedersehen, Pet (2002, TV Series) as Joe Saugus
- Black Point (2002) as Standing Bear
- Now & Forever (2002) as Ghost Fox
- Smallville (2002-2004, TV Series) as Joseph Willowbrook
- On the Corner (2003) as Floyd
- Dreamkeeper (2003, TV Movie) as Kills Enemy
- Moccasin Flats (2003-2006, TV Series) as Joe Redsky
- Seven Times Lucky (2004) as Mr. Five Wounds
- The Making of 'DreamKeeper' (2004, Video documentary short) as Himself
- Hank Williams First Nation (2005) as Adelard Fox
- Into the West (2005, TV Mini-Series) as Growling Bear
- Fugitives Run (2005) as Dan John
- Shania: A Life in Eight Albums (2005, TV Movie) as Greey Twain
- Shoebox Zoo (2005, TV Series) as Nathaniel Stonebear
- The Spirit of Norway House (2005, TV Movie documentary) as Narrator
- Wapos Bay: The Series (2005–2010, TV Series) as Mushom (voice)
- Dream Makers (2006, Documentary) as Himself
- That Beautiful Somewhere (2006) as Harold
- Open Season (2006) as Sheriff Gordy (voice)
- Boog and Elliot's Midnight Bun Run (2006, Video short) as Sheriff Gordy (voice cameo)
- Mr. Soul (2006) as Clifford
- Bury My Heart at Wounded Knee (2007, TV Movie) as Red Cloud
- Out in the Cold (2008, Short) as Soft as Snow
- Blackstone (2009-2011, TV Series) as Cecil Delaronde
- For Love of Liberty: The Story of America's Black Patriots (2010, TV Movie documentary) (voice)
- Doomsday Prophecy (2011, TV Movie) as John
- Wapos Bay: Long Goodbyes (2011) as Mushom
- Guns, Girls and Gambling (2012) as The Chief (final film role)

== See also ==
- John Tootoosis
- National Indian Brotherhood
- Federation of Saskatchewan Indian Nations
