= Carol Morin =

Carol Morin (born in Regina, Saskatchewan, Canada) is a media personality, writer and artist from Saskatchewan.

== Early life ==
Morin was born in Regina, Saskatchewan but is originally from Sandy Bay, Saskatchewan. She is of Cree and Chipewyan descent.

== Media career ==
For three decades Morin has been primarily a member of the media, in television and radio. In 1989 she joined CBC Newsworld, becoming the first aboriginal woman to anchor a national news broadcast in Canada, and later became original host of In-Vision News on APTN. She has worked for many radio and television networks in Canada, most recently leaving a position with CBC North, where the newscast she anchored won Best Newscast, two years in a row, as awarded by the Radio and Television News Directors of Canada. She has returned to her home Province of Saskatchewan. Upon returning, she was a freelance journalist at CBC Regina, in both radio and television. She has since left the media to pursue the NDP nomination in the Moosomin riding of Saskatchewan. A provincial general election will be held in Saskatchewan in November, 2011.

== Voice acting ==
She has portrayed the Cree voices for Kohkum Mary in Wapos Bay and Erin Tzaree in Guardians Evolution.

== Lifestyle ==
She was the first Aboriginal person to embark on a career in southern Canada in television broadcasting at CKCK-TV in Regina in 1983. Years later, she studied law at the University of New Brunswick, eventually becoming the first Aboriginal woman to become a Lay Bencher with the Law Society of Manitoba. She is also a professional actor, having been seen in series television shows like North of 60, Lonesome Dove and Viper. At present, Carol is working towards finishing her artwork for a solo exhibit which open May 1, 2011 and runs to June 23, 2011 at the Elsie Scherle Art Gallery at the Last Mountain Lake Cultural Centre in Regina Beach, Saskatchewan. The exhibit is entitled "Stations Of The Crossed" and deals with historical and current day mistreatment of Aboriginal Peoples in Canada and in Saskatchewan.

== Awards ==
Her work as a journalist has garnered numerous awards, including: A 2009 National Aboriginal Achievement Award, Best Newscast – Prairie Region – by the RTNDA in 2005 & 2006; Best Television News Anchor, Manitoba Film and Television Industry; and Best Producer, Best Feature Story, Best Live Coverage and General Excellence, by Native American Journalists Association. She has been inducted into the Northwest Territories Hall of Fame, has been nominated for A Prairie Music Award for her CD of Aboriginal women's drum songs, and has received writer's grants from the Canada Council and the Northwest Territories government. She has completed writing her first novel, entitled Bearskin Diary, and is looking forward to having her work published. In 2010 - Carol was a proud recipient of a grant from the Saskatchewan Arts Board, to continue work on her children's book, entitled "Kookum's Tablecloth".
