= John Tootoosis =

Cree First Nations leader (1899-1989)

- Born: July 18, 1899; Poundmaker Cree Nation
- Died: February 1, 1989
- Awards: Member of the Order of Canada (1986)

John Baptiste Tootoosis (July 18, 1899 – February 1, 1989) was a Cree First Nations leader in Canada. He is the grandson of Yellow Mud Blanket, the brother of legendary Cree leader Poundmaker, also known as Pitikwahanapiwiyin.

== Early life and family ==
Tootoosis was born on the Poundmaker Reserve in Saskatchewan to Mary Theresa and John Tootoosis. He grew up in a close-knit family, but at the age of 13 was sent away to attend the Thunderchild Residential School, also known as the Delmas Residential School, a Roman Catholic residential school located near North Battleford, Saskatchewan. He returned to the reserve at the age of 17 where his father began to get him involved in the community's political life.

He married Louisa Angus from Thunderchild in 1929. She died in 1987. They had ten sons and three daughters and many of their children and grandchildren were involved in cultural and artistic practice. His son Gordon Tootoosis was a well-known actor. His son Wilfred Tootoosis was a performer and storyteller. His daughter Jean Cuthand Goodwill was the first indigenous woman to graduate from a nursing program in Saskatchewan and wrote a biography on Tootoosis. His grandson Tyrone Tootoosis was an activist, story keeper and actor and was awarded the Canadian Diamond Jubilee medal.

== Career ==
Tootoosis was appointed chief of his band by his community in 1920. His leadership was not recognized by the Canadian government's then Department of Indian Affairs, the branch of government responsible for reserves as the Indian Act dictated that a chief had to be 25 and another chief was chosen. Despite this Tootoosis continued to assert a leadership position. Upon the formation of the Union of Saskatchewan Indians in 1946, he served as its president and later as a member of the executive. In 1959, the union was reorganized as the Federation of Saskatchewan Indian Nations (FSIN), and Tootoosis became its first president. In 1970, he was appointed to the federation's newly formed senate, and served in this capacity for the next 19 years. In recognition of his work and his devotion to "...seeking answers to the grave problems of his people" he became a Member of the Order of Canada in 1986.

Tootoosis died on February 2, 1989.
