= Guardians Evolution =

Guardians Evolution (sometimes stylized Guardians: Evolution or abbreviated as GuardiansEvo or Guardians) is a stop-motion animated TV series that broadcasts as part of APTN Kids on Aboriginal Peoples Television Network. It is broadcast in both Cree and English. It is directed by Dennis Jackson and co-created with Melanie Jackson. They and Eric Jackson wrote the first six episodes, two each, which composed season 1, whose 6 episodes ran in 2014.

A second season of six episodes ran in 2015, bringing the total to 12. The show went on hiatus from 2016-2017. In February 2018 the Shaw Rocket Fund announced that the 3rd season would be premiering in the spring. In May leading up to the premiere, there was a promotion where fans could design avatars as either a human, Eerimar or robot.

== Broadcast and Streaming ==
In the USA, it airs on FNX, the First Nations Experience Network in English.

In USA and Canada, it streams on Ameba TV in English.

== Concept ==
In 2078 A.D., there is a Great Extinction Event. Five teenagers are cryogenically frozen as part of Project Guardian. They awake in 41,740,659 A.D. (expressed as "41 million years later") to a wildly different Earth. With the help of a robot they must resettle the planet, opposed by another preserved human with an army of robots. They were supposed to be frozen for 50 million years but an earthquake contaminated their cryogenic pods and caused an early emergency-release. Their parents are still trapped in contaminated cryo-pods and cannot be released safely so the teens must rebuild civilization alone.

They are tasked with finding a replacement accelerator ring (protected by a cloaking field) so that their base can regain enough power to facilitate repairs. They wear crystal-driven power suits which enhance their strength and speed and protect them from the elements as they venture out into a mutant wilderness. They also carry energy guns with a stun setting. Their suits have buttons which summon a hovercycle or put on a protective helmet (another button removes it, collapsing into a back storage compartment) or shoot a grappling hook with retractable cord to pull them up instead of climbing.

There are giant Herbivores who resemble Sauropods except they are mammals.

== Characters ==
Guardians:

- Eric Afron - project leader and father of Arimus and creator of Chum.
- Domain - the female-voiced computer who Chum interfaces with, voiced by Beatta Van Berkom (and Joanne Morin in Cree).
- Chum - mentor and support robot created by Eric. Voiced by Jody Peters (and Angus Vincent in Cree).
- Arimus Afron - team leader and son of Eric voiced by Eric Jackson (and Randy Morin in Cree). In season 3 he is voiced by Justin Rain.
- Kaulter Jandis - security specialist and vehicle specialist voiced by DerRic Starlight (and Jack Rayne in Cree). In season 3 he is voiced by Aaron Hursh.
- Valta Giori - hacker voiced by Kristina Hughes (and Karen Morin in Cree) including season 3.
- Chema Wandot - medic voiced by Felipe Alberto Paredes-Canevari (and Larry Keenatch in Cree). In season 3 he is voiced by Felipe Paredes-Canevari.
- Erin Tzaree - scientist voiced by Sangeeta Gupta (and Carol Morin in Cree) including season 3.
- Cherish (voiced by Vivian Ng) is a mysterious new hooded ally who aids the guardians in the end of season 2. She is part of the opening credits in season 3, and her mysterious past with Ambrona and Danton are expanded upon.

Eerimar:

- Rajiak - boy
- Alushan - leader

Antagonists

- Ambrona - evil scientist
- Danton - evil henchbot
- sentry guards - evil followers of Ambrona

== Episodes ==
=== Season 1 (2014) ===
The debut date was announced in January 2014

It began airing 1 February 2014

1. Episode 1 – Awakenings debuted 1 February 2014, replaying 30 January 2016
  - Arimus, Kaultor, Valta, Chema and Erin awaken after 41 million years in stasis.
2. Episode 2 – Flight of the Benuix reran 7 November 2015 and 6 February 2016
3. Episode 3 – Seeds Of Hope
4. Episode 4 – A Friend In Need
5. Episode 5 – Into the Grid
6. Episode 6 – The Eerimar

=== Season 2 (2015) ===
It began airing 12 September 2015 in English and HD.

1. Episode 07 - Blackout - debuted 14 September 2015, reran 19 September 2015
2. Episode 08 - Someone Watches Over Me - debuted 21 September 2015
3. Episode 09 - Saurilians - debuted 28 September 2015, reran 3 October 2015
4. Episode 10 - The Wild Card - debuted 5 October 2015, reran 9 January 2016
5. Episode 11 - Dark Thunder - debuted 12 October 2015, reran 17 October 2015
6. Episode 12 - The Hidden Guardians - debuted 19 October 2015, reran 24 October 2015

Season 2 was not translated into Cree until 2016.

=== Season 3 (2018) ===
these episodes play weekend mornings only on APTN's SD version, its HD version no longer broadcasts them and instead plays feature films. APTN E plays the English episodes while APTN N plays the Cree episodes. The Cree episodes debut earlier, Thursdays at 5PM, while the English ones follow on weekends.

- Episode 13 - Welcome to the Jungle - debuted 10 May 2018 per TV guide, official Twitter specifies this was the Cree premiere and this is confirmed on the guide.
  - English premiere was 13 May 2018 per Guardians Evo Twitter and APTN site, it reruns 19 May 2018
- Episode 14 - Cat Scratch Fever - debuted 17 May 2018 per TV guide, confirmed on APTN's schedule.
  - English premiere 20 May 2018 and 26 May 2018
- Episode 15 - Dark Side of the Moon - debuted 24 May 2018
  - English premiere 27 May 2018
- Episode 16 - Mr. Roboto - debuted 31 May 2018
  - English premiere 3 June 2018
- Episode 17 - The Final Countdown - debuted 7 June 2018
  - English debut 10 June 2018

== Games ==
There is an iTunes game developed by Wapos Bay Interactive Inc. released 15 January 2014.

Another game based on season 2 called Into the Abyss is upcoming.
