= Jean Cuthand Goodwill =

Canadian Cree nurse (1928–1997)

Jean Cuthand Goodwill OC
- Born: 1928; Little Pine First Nation, Saskatchewan, Canada
- Died: August 25, 1997 (aged 68–69); Regina, Saskatchewan, Canada
- Occupation: Nurse
- Known for: First aboriginal woman from Saskatchewan to complete a nursing program

Jean Cuthand Goodwill OC (1928 – August 25, 1997) was a Canadian Cree nurse who, in 1954, became Saskatchewan's first Indigenous woman to finish a nursing program.

== Biography ==
Goodwill grew up on the Little Pine First Nation in Saskatchewan; she was a member of the Cree First Nations and a daughter of Cree leader John Tootoosis, about whom she would later write a biography. She decided to train as a nurse after spending three years at the sanatorium in Prince Albert recovering from tuberculosis. Graduating from the program at Holy Family Hospital in 1954, she then worked in rural Saskatchewan, where she reached patients in an emergency via bush plane or dog team. She also worked in Bermuda. After returning to Canada she became increasingly interested in Indigenous issues, helping to develop an Indigenous magazine called Tawow.

Goodwill helped establish the Aboriginal Nurses Association of Canada, and served as the organization's president during the period of 1983 to 1990. She was the first Indigenous woman to serve as "special advisor" to the minister of National Health and Welfare in the Canadian federal government; she also worked with the Department of Indian Affairs and Northern Development.

Goodwill taught Indian Health Studies at Saskatchewan Indian Federated College of the University of Regina (now First Nations University of Canada). She also helped to create a Native Access to Nursing Program at the University of Saskatchewan. She was a board member of the Canadian Public Health Association and served as president of the Canadian Society for Circumpolar Health.

Married in 1965, Goodwill and her husband Ken Miller had two adopted girls. Goodwill died of cancer in Regina, Saskatchewan in 1997.

The Canadian Coast Guard ship Jean Goodwill is named for her.

== Selected works ==
- John Tootoosis: A Biography of a Cree Leader (1982)

== Awards ==
- Jean Goodwill Award, Manitoba Indian Nurses Association (1981)
- Honorary Doctorate of Law, Queen's University (1986)
- Officer of the Order of Canada (1992)
- National Excellence Award, National Aboriginal Achievement Foundation (now Indspire) (1994)
- In August 2022 the Canadian Coast Guard Ship CCGS Jean Goodwill was commissioned. The ship is based in Dartmouth, Nova Scotia.
