= Wapos Bay =

Television series

Wapos Bay is a stop motion animated family drama comedy television series that follows the adventures of three (or four) children (Raven, her brother Talon, their cousin T-Bear and friend Devon) as they explore their remote Cree community in northern Saskatchewan It is aired across Canada by the Aboriginal Peoples Television Network (as part of APTN Kids) and in the United States on the First Nations Experience Network (FNX).

It is aired in the languages of Cree, English, French and Inuktitut.

The series was created by Dennis and Melanie Jackson of Saskatoon, and is a humorous look at aboriginal life featuring positive role models for children. The producers have been able to procure the help of people including Jordin Tootoo, Lee Majors and Mike Holmes to supply voices to their own characters (or in Lee Majors' case, a character based on Steve Austin, his character from The Six Million Dollar Man).

The pilot episode There's No "I" In Hockey received the Canada Award for best Canadian multicultural program as well as a Golden Sheaf Award for best children's production. In 2012, the film Wapos Bay: Long Goodbyes was nominated for the 2012 Kidscreen Award for Best One-Off, Special or TV Movie and end up winning against its other nominees, ZhuZhu Pets: Quest for Zhu and HeartCatch PreCure! The Movie: Fashion Show in Paris!! The first two seasons of Wapos Bay were coproduced with the National Film Board of Canada.

== List of episodes ==
1. There's No 'I' in Hockey debuted May 15, 2005
2. Journey Through Fear debuted October 9, 2006
3. They Dance at Night debuted 2007
4. Something to Remember debuted 6 November 2006
5. A Time To Learn debuted 16 October 2006
6. The Elements debuted October 16, 2006
7. All's Fair debuted 2007
8. As the Bannock Browns debuted 20 November 2007
9. Guardians debuted 11 December 2007
10. All Access debuted 11 November 2006
11. As Long as the River Flows debuted 4 December 2007
12. Tricks 'n' Treats debuted 12 February 2008
13. The Hunt debuted 20 November 2007
14. A Mother's Earth debuted 23 December 2008
15. Going for the Gold debuted 18 November 2008
16. Raven Power debuted 25 November 2008
17. Lights, Camera, Action debuted 2 December 2008
18. Dance, Dance debuted 9 December 2008
19. Raiders of the Lost Art debuted 16 December 2008
20. The Hardest Lesson debuted 2009 or 14 June 2010
21. Dance Monkey Dance debuted ? 2009
22. Self Improvement debuted 28 October 2009
23. Patients debuted 18 November 2009
24. A Time for Pride debuted 25 November 2009
25. Breakin' Too debuted ? 2009
26. It Came from Out There debuted ? 2009
27. Time Management debuted 6 October 2010
28. The Ways of the Quiet debuted 13 October 2010
29. The World According to Devon debuted ? 2010
30. Catch the Spirit debuted ? 2010
31. Partic-Inaction debuted ? 2010
32. The Wapos Falcon debuted ? 2010
33. Too Deadly debuted ? 2010
34. Treasure of the Sierra Metis debuted ? 2010
35. Long Goodbyes debuted 23 October 2011
  - This was a 72 minute film, not a standard 1/2 hour episode of the TV series.

=== Notes ===
- In "Patients", Devon refers to a "Waposogo" lake monster, a reference to the Ogopogo.

== Characters ==
These are the characters listed:

=== Children ===
- Thomas Bear "T-Bear" Morin is the son of Jacob and the cousin of Raven and Talon. His mother died when he was a baby and his father raised him alone. He is initially 10, later 11 years old.
- Raven Marasti (is the younger sister of Talon, cousin of T-Bear, romantic interest of Devon, and primary female character. She is initially 6 and later 7 years old She has the same name as her English voice actress.
- Talon Marasti is the older brother of Raven, cousin of T-Bear and nephew of Jacob. He is initially 10–11 years old like T-bear and Devon.
- Devon Valentine is a 10 later 11-year-old boy, who is T-Bear and Talon's best friend, and has a crush on Raven.
- Amber is Raven's best friend who she talks to about her romantic life in "Too Deadly". She is also a focus in "Patients" when she is late for camp.
- Emarus is a pale boy that is new in town, who takes Raven to the dance with him in "Too Deadly". He is estimated by Amber to be 4 years older than Raven (like Devon, T-bear and Talon)
- Lynn is an older girl competing against Raven in the scavenger hunt in "Treasure of the Sierra Metis". T-Bear, Talon, and Devon once had a crush on her, but were all unsuccessful at asking her out to the dance.
- Melanie Thunderbird is a girl who is a hockey player, and is T-Bear and Talon's new friend in "There's No 'I' in Hockey".
- Betty is T-Bear's handicapped cousin, who sits in a wheelchair. She appears in the episode "All Access".
- Elue Winlock is a new student in school, a hockey player, and T-Bear's new friend in "All's Fair".

=== Adults ===
- Cyril "Mushom" Morin (January 2, 1944) is the father of Jacob and Sarah and grandfather of Talon, Raven and T-Bear.
- Roslie "Kohkum" Morin is the wife of Cyril, mother of Jacob and Sarah, and grandmother of T-Bear, Talon, and Raven. Not to be confused with Kohkum Mary. Cyril's wife's name is revealed in the episode "The Elements".
- Jacob Morin is the son of Cyril and Kohkum, the father of T-Bear and the uncle of Raven and Talon. He works in the Wapos Bay First Nation BAND OFFICE. He wears a pink sweater annually for Breast Cancer Awareness Week and also when The Village People broke up. He has the same surname as Raven's Cree voice actress and Devon's Cree voice actor. Closed captions for the show have mistakenly spelled his surname "Moren". (voice: Cree: Lawrence Durocher, Inuktitut: Gary Aipellee, English: Lorne Cardinal)
- Sarah Marasti is the mother of Raven and Talon, sister of Jacob, aunt of T-Bear, and the wife of Alphonse.
- Alphonse Marasti is Raven and Talon's father, and the husband of Sarah. His name is revealed in the Mike Holmes episode and the one where Raven sneaks cereal into her mom's shopping cart without permission. He is not credited with a voice actor since a running gag is him not talking, at most mumbling.
- Jordin Tootoo is a professional hockey player, a doctor, and is welcomed to meet T-Bear's family in "All's Fair".
- Ancestor (voiced by Melanie Jackson)
- Elue (voiced by Quinn Wilson)
- Pitsi (voiced by Jennifer Prokop)
- Uncle Peter (voiced by Tyrone Tootoosis) is the uncle of someone and brother of someone else. Bald with grey moustache.
- Kohkum Mary (English: Trevor Cameron, Cree: Carol Morin)
- Principal Steele (English: Jody Peters, Cree: Jack Rayne)
- Chief Big Sky (English & Cree: Joseph Naytowhow)
- Officer Musqua (voiced by Delvin Kanewiyakiho or Delvin Kennedy) is a cop.
- Captain Machon (English: Trevor Cameron, Cree: Delvin Kanewiyakiho)
- Hector (English & Cree: Angus Vincent) runs the Wapos Bay Gas Bar.
- Horatio (English & Cree: Ross Nykiforuk, sometimes Styles Montreaux)
- Emarus' father is a chef who the kids think is a vampire. He is originally introduced as the Supa-Dupa Cooka in "Partic-inaction".
- Mrs. Valentine (English: DerRic Starlight, Cree: Randy Morin) is Devon's mom, the Mary Kate cosmetics salesperson.
- Ron McCrane (parody of Ron MacLean, English: Devon Brass/Marvin Brass, Cree: Randy Morin)
- Don Redcherry (parody of Don Cherry, English: DerRic Starlight, Cree: Jack Rayne) hosts the local radio network with Ron.
- Mr. Darian (English: Jody Peters, Cree: Jackie Keenatch) is the boys' teacher at Wapos Bay School.
- Ms. Cooper (English: Melanie Jackson, Cree: Karen Morin) runs the summer camp in "Patients".
- Nurse Pitsi (English: Jennifer Prokop, Cree: Debbie Thomas)

=== Outsiders ===
- Mike Holmes (voiced in English by himself)
- Dr. Lee Wilson appears in "Patients". (English: Lee Wilson, Cree: Delvin Kanewiyakiho)
- Lenny Littlehorn aka Iced Latte (English: Jody Peters, Cree: Jack Rayne) appears in "Breakin' Too", a rapper who knows Big Sky.
- Mr. Coombs speaks French.

== See also ==
- Guardians Evolution, made by the same animators and sharing many voice actors
