= Molly Kool =

Canadian sea captain (1916–2009)

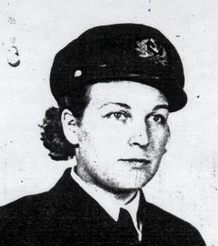
- Molly Kool in 1937
- Born: Myrtle Kool; February 23, 1916; Alma, New Brunswick, Canada
- Died: February 25, 2009 (aged 93); Bangor, Maine, U.S.
- Resting place: Herring Cove, Fundy National Park
- Known for: One of the first female sea captain in North America
- Title: Captain
- Spouse(s): Ray Blaisdell (m. 1944; died 1964); John Carney (m. c. 1965; her death 2009)

Myrtle "Molly" Kool (February 23, 1916 – February 25, 2009) was a Canadian sea captain. She is recognized as being one of the first registered female sea captains or ship masters in North America. She was one of the first female Master Mariners in Canada.

== Early life ==
Myrtle Kool was born in Alma, New Brunswick, the daughter of Myrtle Anderson and Paul Kool, a Dutch sailor, the second of five siblings. She disliked her given name and changed it to Molly instead. She grew up sailing, spending much time on the Jean K, a 21-metre (69 ft) scow built and owned by her father and named for her older sister.

== Career ==
In 1937 at age 21, Kool joined the Merchant Marine School in Saint John, New Brunswick, being the only woman to ever do so, earning a mate's certificate. She had previously been turned away from studying there. On April 19, 1939, Kool graduated and received her Master Mariner's papers from the Merchant Marine Institution in Yarmouth, Nova Scotia. As a result, a line in the Canadian Shipping Act was amended to read "he or she."

On passing her exams, she telegraphed her family “You can call me captain from now on”. Her father turned the title to the scow Jean K over to her and she captained it for five years, working mainly the pulp and paper trade in the Bay of Fundy.

She dealt with three potential shipwreck incidents during her years as captain. One when a Norwegian captain demanded she move her ship from its the berth, and when she refused, attempted to jam the Jean K into the dock. He then attempted to bribe her to move it, then rammed the ship bow on, cutting the lines and causing it to set adrift. Kool ordered her crew to abandon ship and the Jean K grounded on a nearby river bank, with surprisingly little damage. The Kool family sued the other captain for damage.

A collision with another boat in thick fog caused Kool to fall overboard and be dragged towards the propellers. She managed to swim under the boat to the other side and grab some passing timber. As people on the ship threw life preservers towards her she was said to have shouted "I’m already floating. Stop throwing useless stuff at me and send a boat!”

The final incident in 1944 was a fire which destroyed the engine room, cabin and wheel house of the Jean K. Kool was left with the clothes on her back as her belongings were blown up in the gasoline explosion.

== Later life and death ==
In 1944, after her ship caught fire, Kool left life at sea to marry Ray Blaisdell of Bucksport, Maine in 1944. Her brother took over as captain of the rebuilt Jean K.

Blaisdell died in the 1960s and she remarried, wedding John Carney of Orrington, Maine. She sold Singer sewing machines during this time. Kool eventually retired fully after losing both her legs to a vascular disease.

Kool spent her remaining years in a seniors care home in Bangor, Maine. She died from pneumonia in a hospital in Bangor, aged 93. Her ashes were scattered on the Bay of Fundy at Herring Cove, near her birthplace.

== Legacy ==
In 2018 the Canadian Coast Guard named an icebreaker after her as CCGS Captain Molly Kool, and in 2019 a sailing ship was named in her honour.

A monument to her accomplishment was erected near the wharf in Alma. As of 2011, the home she grew up in is being rebuilt from the original remains and an exhibit is planned at the entrance of Fundy National Park.
