= Loke Viking =

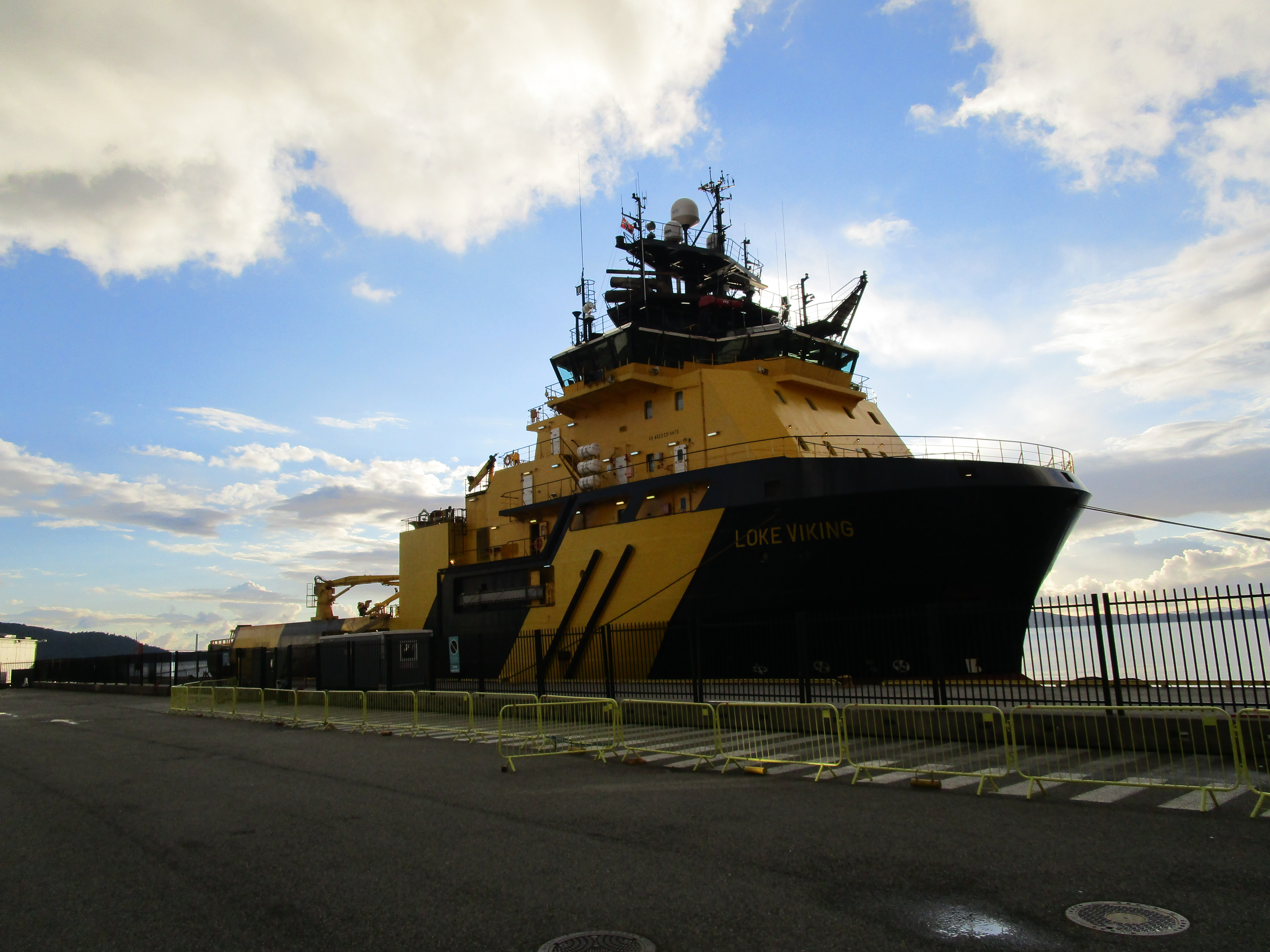
Loke Viking in the harbour of Bergen, Norway

The Loke Viking is an Anchor handling tug scheduled to be completed in May 2010. She will be the first in a class of four vessels built for Trans Viking. In June 2010 she will be chartered by Edinburgh-based oil company Cairn Energy UK PLC for four months, starting in June 2010, for drilling operations in Baffin Bay.
