= Tyrone Tootoosis =

Canadian Cree storyteller, activist, dancer and culture keeper (1958-2017)

- Born: May 9, 1958
- Died: February 12, 2017; Duck Lake
- Occupations: Oral storytelling; actor

Tyrone Tootoosis (May 9, 1958 – February 12, 2017) was a Plains Cree storyteller, activist, culture keeper and dancer. He was born on May 9, 1958, in Canada on the Samson Reserve in Maskwacis, Alberta and raised on the Poundmaker Cree Nation Reserve in Saskatchewan. He was a member of the Tootoosis family and was a descendant of Yellow Mud Blanket, a brother of Chief Poundmaker, also known as Pîhtokahanapiwiyin. His grandfather was John Tootoosis, who was an activist for First Nations rights and founder of the Saskatchewan Indian Federation and he was the first born son of Wilfred Tootoosis, a historian and storyteller and Irene B. Tootoosis. He was married to Winona Wheeler, a professor of Indigenous studies at the University of Saskatchewan. Actor Gordon Tootoosis was his uncle.

Tootoosis dedicated his life to revitalizing Cree culture and had a close relationship with his grandfather John Tootoosis, learning the culture and traditions of his people. He recorded the stories and voices of Elders. Following the tradition of his family, he became a culture keeper for his community and was a storyteller, historian, pow wow dancer and social activist. He worked to develop the Wanuskewin Heritage Park and the Saskatchewan Native Theatre Company, now named the Gordon Tootoosis Theatre Company.

Following in the traditions of his uncle Gordon Tootoosis, Tootoosis appeared in several films, including DreamKeeper (2003), Wapos Bay: Long Goodbyes (2011) and Christmas at Wapos Bay (2002). Tootoosis played Poundmaker, his great-great-granduncle, in the TV mini-series, Big Bear (1998).

Tootoosis' storytelling had significant impact. His story on the Saskatchewan River and the importance of water was recounted in Roy MacGregor in his book on Canadian rivers.

The recipient of numerous awards, Tootoosis was awarded the Saskatchewan Lieutenant Governor's Arts Award for Arts and Learning in 2008 for his cultural and artistic work, advocacy and role as an educator.

Tootoosis died on February 12, 2017, near Duck Lake, Saskatchewan, of colon cancer.
