= Trans Viking Icebreaking & Offshore =

Shipping company in Norway

Trans Viking Icebreaking & Offshore AS
- Company type: Private
- Industry: Shipping
- Founded: 1998
- Headquarters: Kristiansand, Norway
- Area served: Sweden
- Key people: Stefan Erik Eliasson (CEO); Lars Håkan Larsson (Chairman)
- Revenue: ▲NOK 265 million (2010)
- Operating income: NOK 97 million (2010)
- Net income: NOK 80 million (2010)
- Parent: Viking Supply Ships; Rederi Transatlantic

Trans Viking Icebreaking & Offshore is an icebreaker shipping company. A joint venture between Viking Supply Ships and Rederi Transatlantic the company operates three icebreakers on contract with the Swedish Maritime Administration for icebreaking in the Baltic Sea from January through March. Commercial management is handled by VSS while Transatlantic is responsible for technical management.

The company was created in 1998 and has also contracted for four anchor handling tug supply vessels for delivery from Astilleros Zamakona during 2009–11. The company is based in Kristiansand, Norway.
