= Havyard Group =

Norwegian ship building company

Havyard Group ASA
- Type: Allmennaksjeselskap
- Traded as: OSE: HYARD
- Industry: Ship equipment
- Founded: 2000
- Headquarters: Fosnavåg, Norway
- Number of employees: 6 (2026)
- Website: www.havyard.com

Havyard Group is a Norwegian ship technology company, headquartered in Fosnavåg, Norway. The company was started in 2000 with the purchase of Løland verft in Leirvik.

Havyard was listed on the Oslo Stock Exchange in July 2014.
