= Anchor handling tug supply vessel =

Type of supply vessel

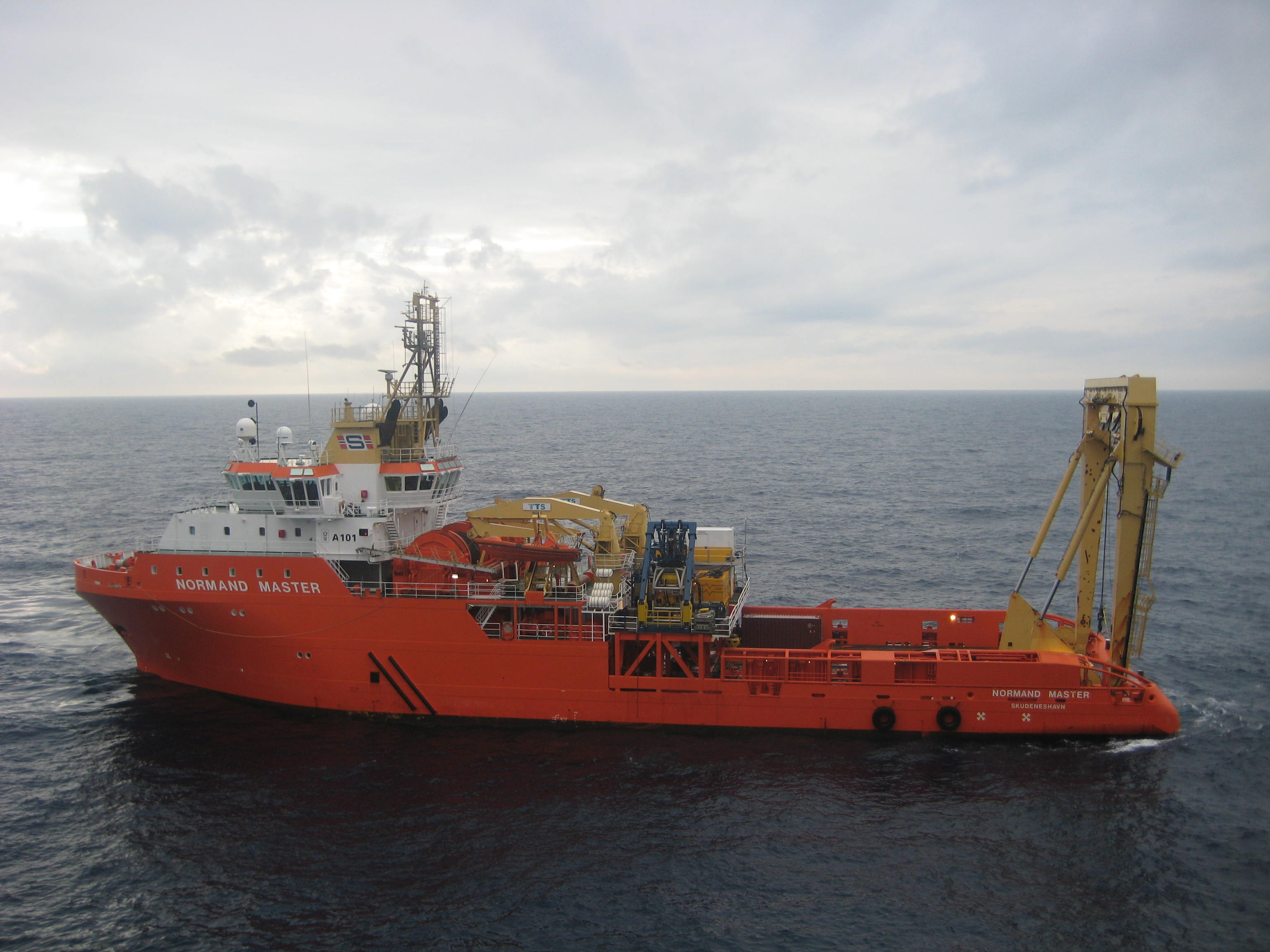
AHTS Normand Master alongside the Balder at Thunder Horse Oil Field

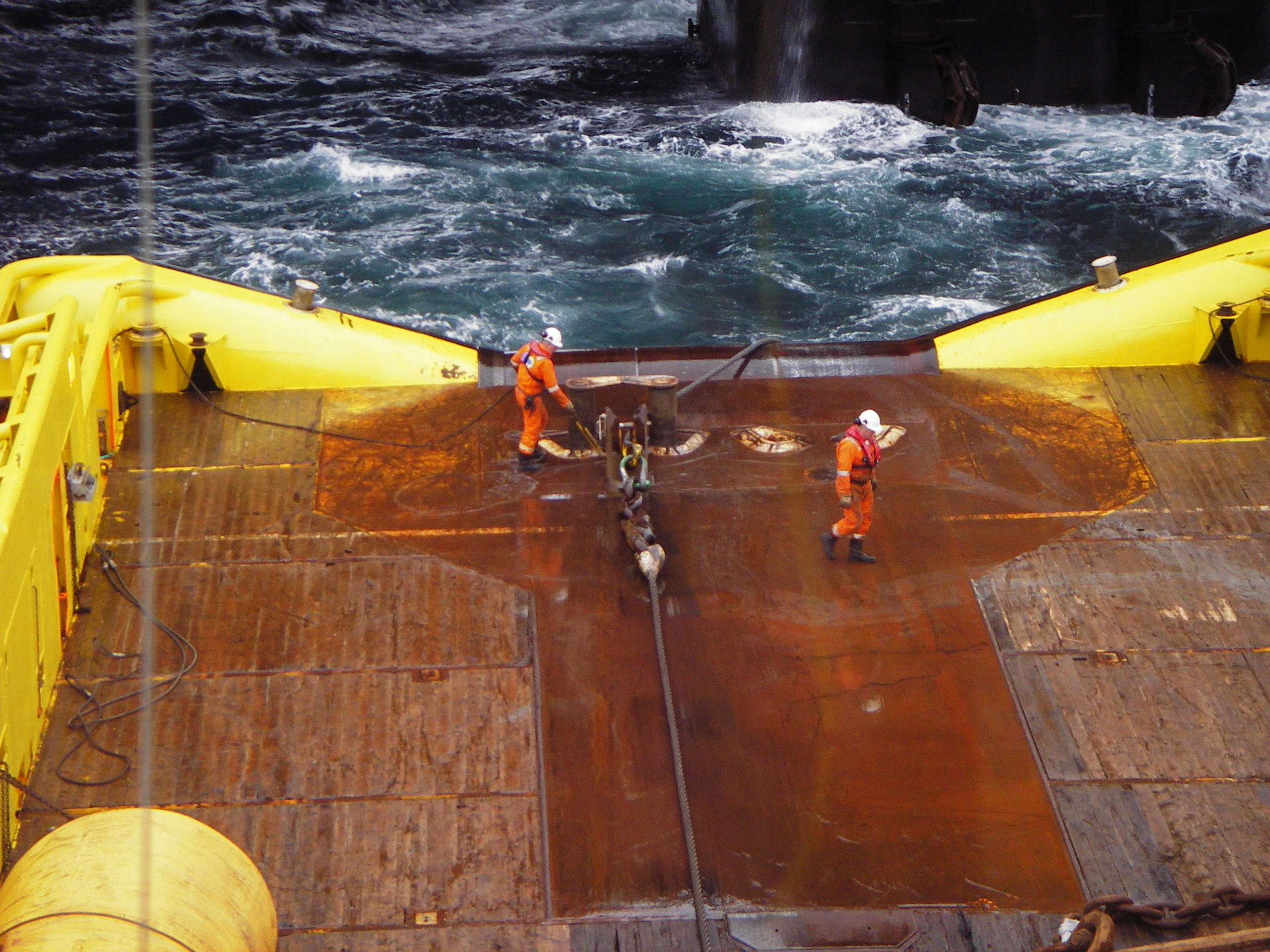
AHTS Balder Viking handling anchors for the Semi-submersible Platform Transocean Arctic

Examples of AHTS vessels

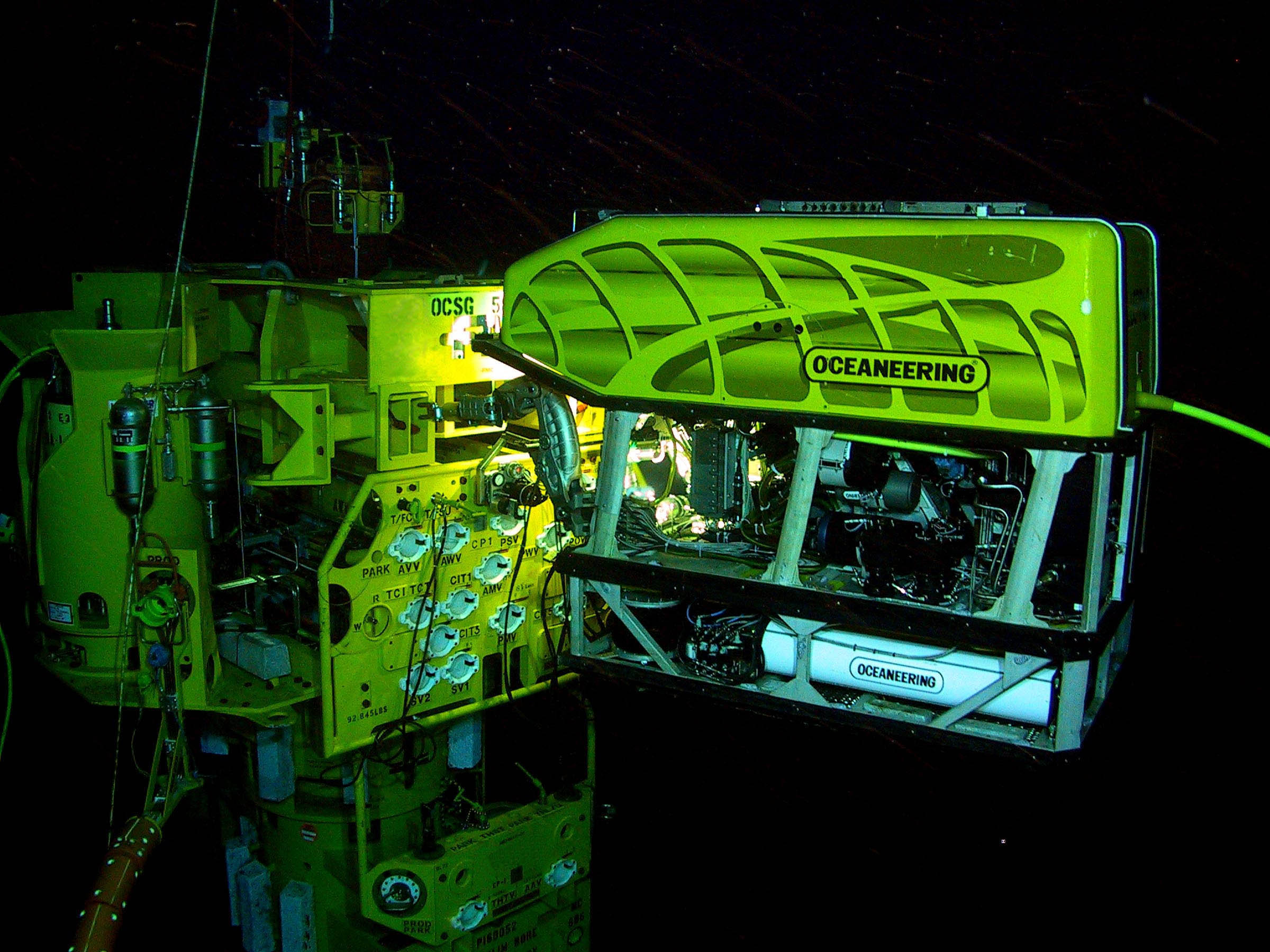
ROV at work in an underwater oil and gas field. The ROV is operating a subsea torque spanner tool on a valve on the subsea structure.

Anchor Handling Tug Supply (AHTS) vessels are mainly built to handle anchors for oil rigs, tow them to location, and use them to secure the rigs in place. AHTS vessels sometimes also serve as Emergency Response and Rescue Vessels (ERRVs) and as supply transports.

Many of these vessels are designed to meet the harsh conditions of the North Sea, and can undertake supply duties there between land bases and drilling sites. They also provide towing assistance during tanker loading, deepwater anchor handling, and towing of threatening objects.

AHTS vessels differ from platform supply vessels (PSVs) in being fitted with winches for towing and anchor handling, having an open stern to allow the decking of anchors, and having more power to increase the bollard pull. The machinery is specifically designed for anchor handling operations. They also have arrangements for quick anchor release, which is operable from the bridge or other normally crewed locations in direct communication with the bridge. The reference load used in the design and testing of the towing winch is twice the static bollard pull.

Even if AHTS-vessels are customized for anchor-handling and towing, they can also undertake, for example, ROV (remotely operated underwater vehicle) services, safety/rescue services, and supply duties between mainland and offshore installations.

The world's strongest tug since its delivery in 2020 is MV Island Victory (Vard Brevik 831) of Island Offshore, with a bollard pull of 477 tonnes-force (526 short tons-force; 4,680 kN).

== See also ==
- Salvage tug
- Emergency tow vessel
