= Voima (1952 icebreaker) =

Finnish icebreaker

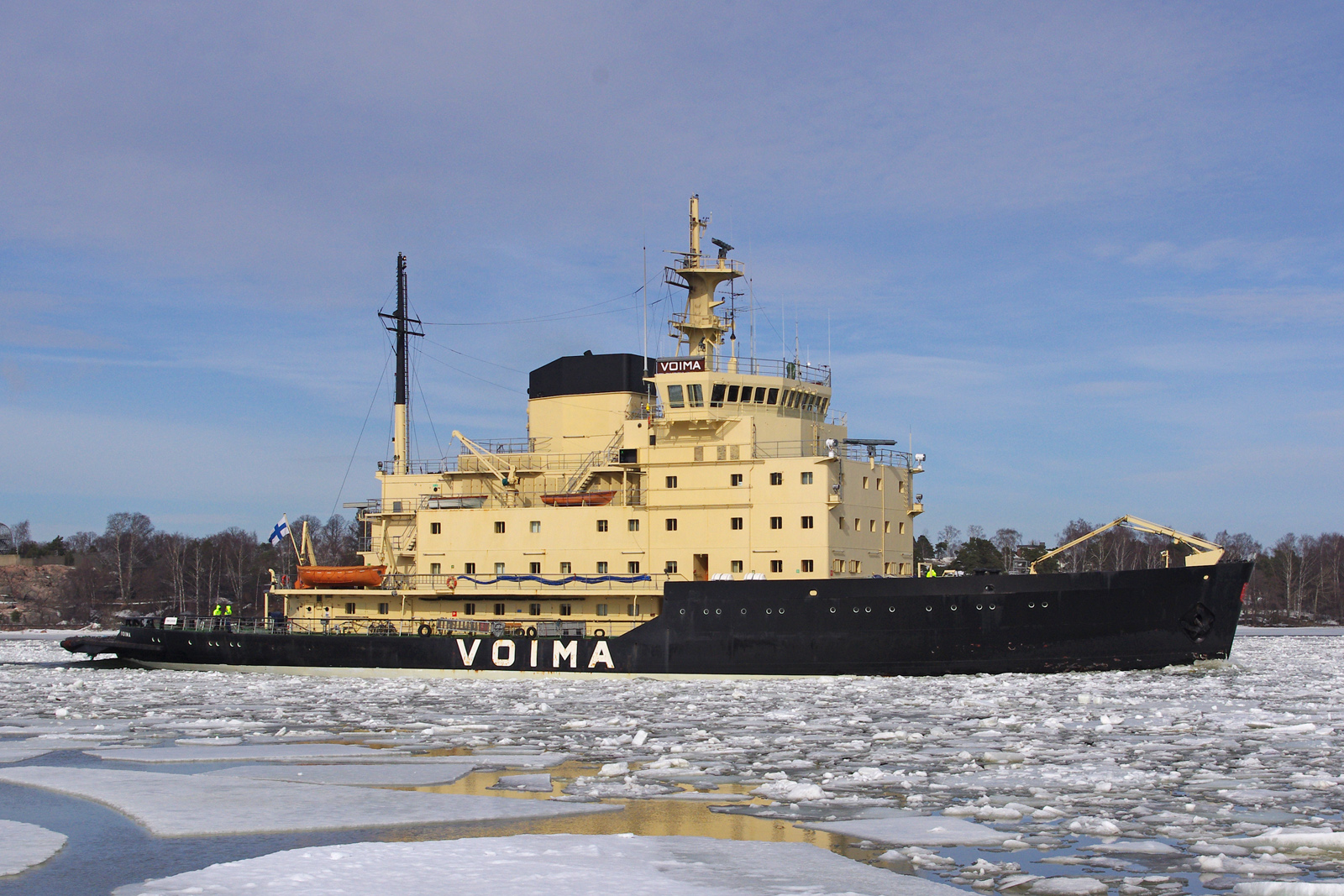
- Voima leaving Helsinki after bunkering on 5 April 2011

History

Finland
- Name: Voima
- Namesake: Finnish for "strength"
- Owner: Finnish Maritime Administration (Note: Finnish National Board of Navigation until 1998.) (1953–2004); Finstaship (2004–2010); Jäänmurtaja Voima Oy (Arctia Oy) (2010–)
- Port of registry: Helsinki, Finland
- Builder: Wärtsilä Helsinki shipyard (Helsinki, Finland)
- Yard number: 349
- Laid down: 29 May 1951
- Launched: 27 November 1952
- Sponsored by: Sylvi Kekkonen
- Completed: 12 February 1954
- Commissioned: 13 February 1954
- Refit: 1978–1979; 2016
- Identification: IMO number: 5383158; Call sign: OHLW; MMSI number: 230291000
- Status: In service

General characteristics (as built)
- Type: Icebreaker
- Tonnage: 3,850 GRT
- Displacement: 4,415 tons
- Length: 83.5 m (273 ft 11 in)
- Beam: 19.4 m (63 ft 8 in)
- Draft: 6.4 m (21 ft 0 in)
- Depth: 9.5 m (31 ft 2 in)
- Ice class: 1A
- Installed power: 6 × Atlas Polar K58M (6 × 1,500 kW)
- Propulsion: Diesel-electric (DC/DC); Four shafts; fixed pitch propellers; 7,800 kW (combined)
- Speed: 16.5 knots (30.6 km/h; 19.0 mph)
- Crew: 58

General characteristics (after refit)
- Type: Icebreaker
- Tonnage: 4,159 GT; 1,248 NT; 4,486 DWT
- Displacement: 5,209 tons
- Length: 83.5 m (273 ft 11 in)
- Beam: 19.4 m (63 ft 8 in)
- Draft: 7 m (23 ft 0 in)
- Depth: 9.5 m (31 ft 2 in)
- Ice class: 1A Super
- Installed power: 6 × Wärtsilä 16V22 (6 × 2,140 kW)
- Propulsion: Diesel-electric (AC/DC); Four shafts; fixed-pitch propellers; 10,240 kW (combined)
- Speed: 16 knots (30 km/h; 18 mph); 2 knots (3.7 km/h; 2.3 mph) in 1.2 m (3 ft 11 in) ice
- Crew: 21

Voima is a Finnish state-owned icebreaker. Built by Wärtsilä Hietalahti shipyard in Helsinki in 1954, she was the first icebreaker in the world to be equipped with two bow propellers and generated widespread publicity that helped the Finnish shipbuilding industry to become the world leader in icebreaker design.

Voima was extensively refitted in 1978–1979. As of 2024, she is the oldest and smallest state-owned icebreaker in service in Finland. Originally, Voima was scheduled to be replaced by a new icebreaker by the winter of 2015–16. However, in 2016 it was decided to extend her operational lifetime by at least ten years with another refit.

== Development and construction ==
In the Moscow Armistice, signed on 19 September 1944, Finland agreed to pay war reparations of US$300 million to the Soviet Union. The war reparations, paid in the form of ships and machinery over six years, included the newest steam-powered state-owned icebreakers Voima and Jääkarhu. This left Finland with one modern diesel-electric icebreaker, Sisu, which had been damaged by a naval mine during the war, and four older steam-powered icebreakers. Of these, especially Murtaja and Apu were considered nearly obsolete and their efforts in the Archipelago Sea were sometimes described being "mostly of moral nature". As a result, only the ports of Hanko and Turku were kept open through the first post-war winters.

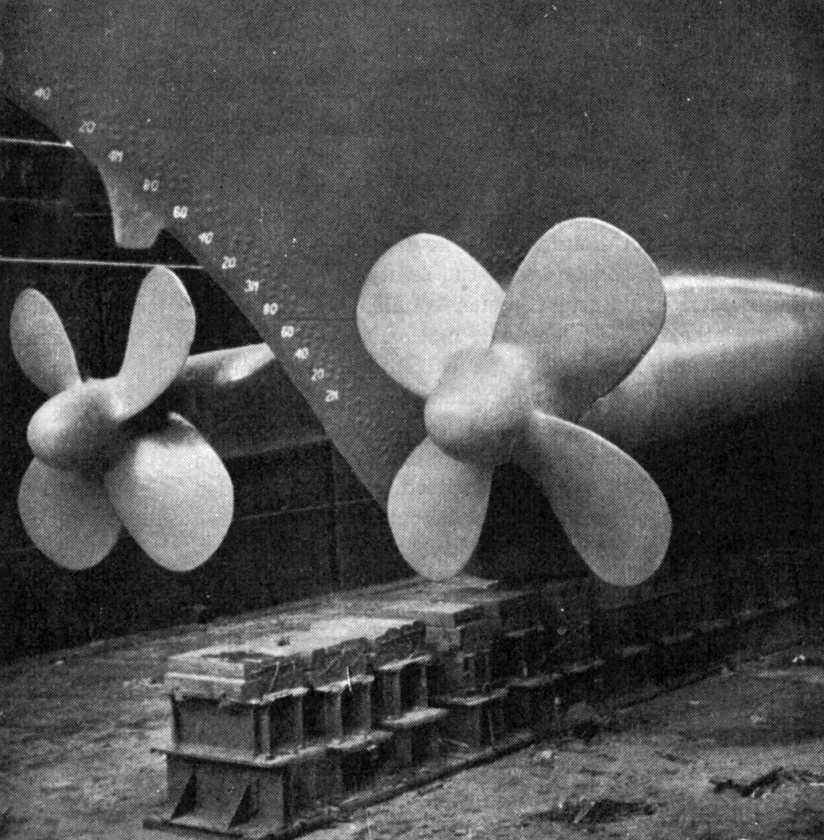
Voima was the first icebreaker in the world with two bow propellers

In 1946, the Finnish Government appointed a committee to start planning the rebuilding of the Finnish icebreaker fleet. The committee, consisting of the director of the Finnish Maritime Administration, Svante Sundman, and two experienced Finnish shipbuilders, K. Albin Johansson and Ossian Tybeck, delivered its final report on the construction of a new icebreaker in the following year. The main dimensions of the new 4,415-ton icebreaker, large enough to escort 10,000-ton dry cargo ships or 16,000-ton tankers, were based on the old Jääkarhu, but the triple-expansion steam engines were replaced with a modern diesel-electric propulsion system, similar to the 1939-built Sisu, with a combined output of 10,500 shp. In the early drafts, the new icebreaker was designed with three propellers (two in the stern and one in the bow) and an asymmetric stem that would compensate for the transverse force caused by the bow propeller. However, these features were later dropped after extensive model testing and co-operation with Swedish naval architects in favor of a completely new design.

The result was, in many respects, the most advanced icebreaker in the world at the time. Although bow propellers had been a common feature in icebreakers around the world for decades, it was incorrectly believed that they helped with the actual icebreaking process by reducing the pressure under the ice in front of the ship. However, extensive research and recent experiences had shown that bow propellers improved the icebreaking capability because their flushing effect reduced the friction between the broken ice floes and the hull of the ship. The drawback of a single bow propeller was that it would lubricate only one side of the hull. As a result, the new Finnish icebreaker was designed with two bow propellers which would produce a more powerful and, more importantly, symmetric flushing effect. Furthermore, a vessel with four propellers would be extremely maneuverable and capable of even moving sideways. Prior to the new Finnish icebreaker, only the 1947-built Canadian ferry Abegweit had been fitted with such propulsion arrangement. While the new ship was not the largest icebreaker in the world at the time, the power-to-displacement and power-to-beam ratios of the new Finnish icebreaker put her in a class of her own among icebreaking ships.

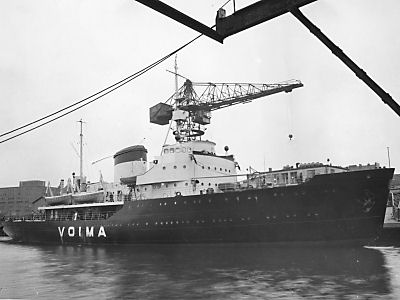
Voima shortly before delivery at Wärtsilä Hietalahti shipyard

The construction of the first Finnish post-war icebreaker was awarded to Wärtsilä in 1948, but due to lack of funding the keel of the ship was not laid down at the Hietalahti shipyard until 29 May 1951. The working name of the newbuilding was Into, but when she was launched on 27 November 1952, the new Finnish icebreaker was christened Voima by Sylvi Kekkonen, wife of the Prime Minister and future President of Finland, Urho Kekkonen. Her name, Finnish for "strength", had previously been given to one of the icebreakers that had been handed over to the Soviet Union after the war. The official sea trials were completed on 12 February 1954 and on the following day the icebreaker was handed over to the Finnish Maritime Administration. At the time of delivery, the 10,500-horsepower Voima also briefly held the title for the most powerful icebreaker in the world, surpassing both the old Soviet steam-powered polar icebreakers as well as the diesel-electric Wind-class icebreakers and USCGC Mackinaw which all had a propulsion power of 10,000 shp. However, in the following spring the United States commissioned USS Glacier which, at 21,000 shp, had twice the power of the Finnish icebreaker.

The new state-owned icebreaker generated widespread publicity and the follow-up orders allowed Wärtsilä to establish the Finnish shipbuilding industry as the world leader in the design and construction of icebreaking ships. After Voima, the shipyard delivered three icebreakers of similar design to the Soviet Union (Kapitan Belousov, Kapitan Voronin and Kapitan Melehov) and one for the Swedish Maritime Administration (Oden). By the late 1980s, Wärtsilä had produced about 60 percent of the worldwide icebreaker fleet, including all Finnish icebreakers in service at the time.

== Career ==
=== Early career ===
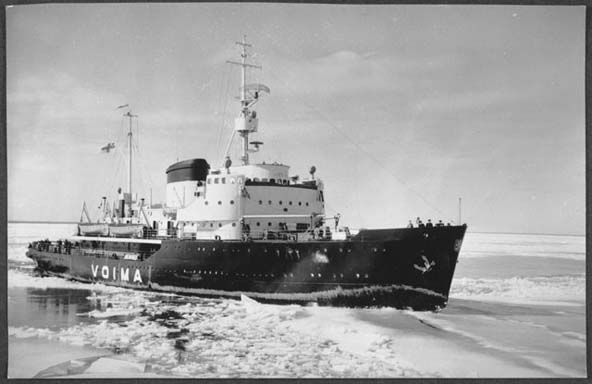
Voima breaking ice outside Helsinki, showing her original outfit

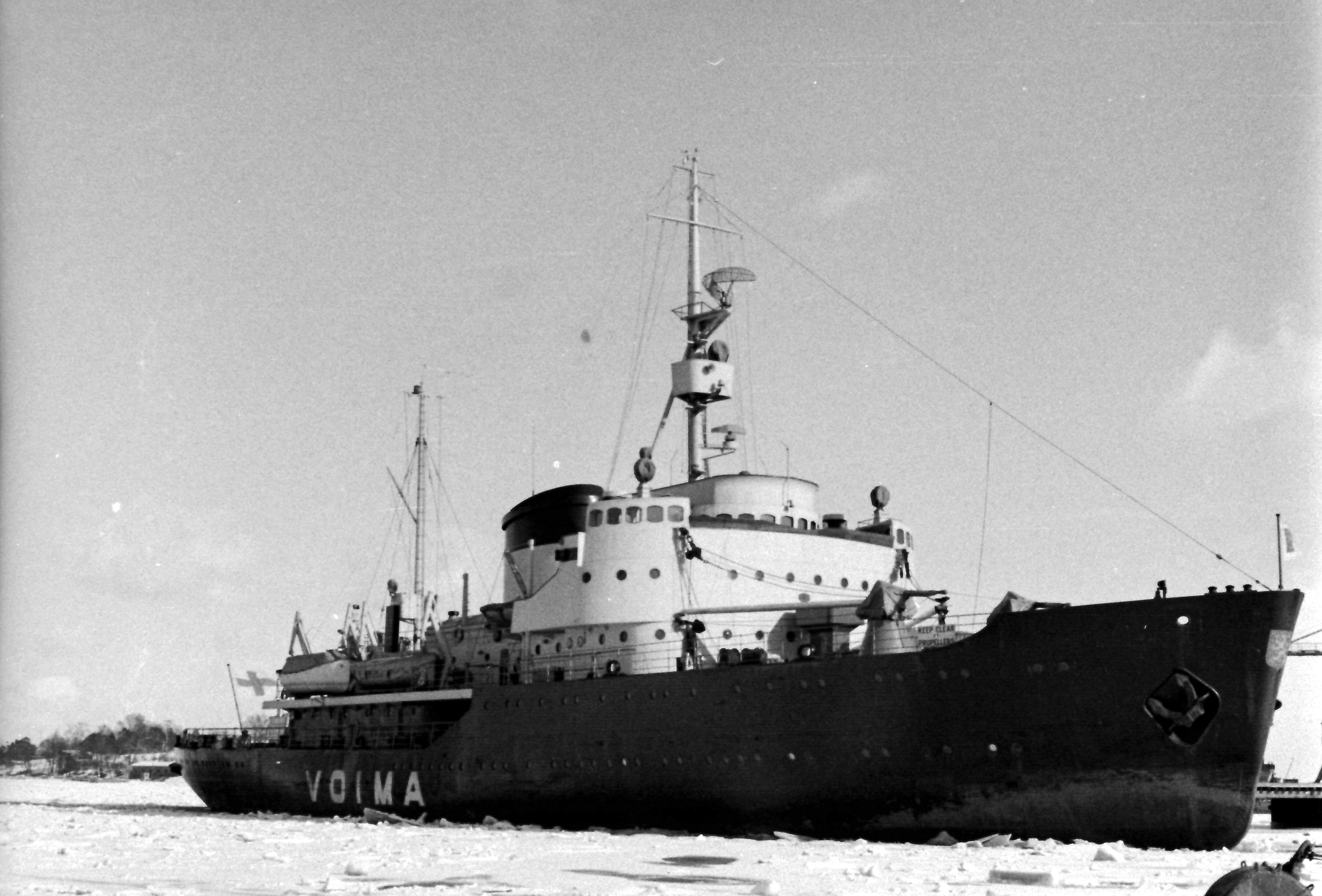
Voima under Finnish Navy in March 1955, equipped with two 40 mm Bofors guns.

While the new icebreaker was being built, the state-owned icebreaker fleet had become a powerful strike weapon for Niilo Wälläri, the chairman of the Finnish Seamen's Union. By the early 1950s, the strikes had become so common that they were sometimes considered a normal part of the arrival of winter. It was even jokingly said that a new icebreaker strike could be predicted simply by looking at the thermometer—the "strike threshold" would be reached when the temperature dropped low enough for the seas to freeze. When Wälläri announced a new strike in 1953, the Finnish Government decided to take action as the icebreaker strikes effectively stopped all foreign trade during the winter months, causing major losses for the Finnish industry. In Sweden, the state-owned icebreakers were part of the Swedish Navy and thus were not allowed to go on strike. On 9 February 1954, only four days before Voima was commissioned, it was decided to move the new icebreaker under the Finnish Navy, where it would replace the 77-year-old Von Döbeln as the supply ship for the torpedo boats during the summer months. During the icebreaking season, the ship would still be crewed by the Navy, but used to escort merchant ships under the command of the Finnish Maritime Administration.

The change of flag was postponed until the end of the winter season due to opposition from the Seamen's Union. When Voima was transferred to the Finnish Navy on 1 May 1954, the Seamen's Union announced that Finnish merchant ships, crewed by civilians, would not subject themselves to military authority by accepting assistance from a naval ship. As a result, the ports of Kotka and Hamina were effectively closed during the first months of the following winter, trapping a number of ships in the harbors, as Voima was the only icebreaker stationed in the eastern part of the Gulf of Finland. Eventually, the Government gave up and called Voima to Helsinki, where she remained until the spring. On 1 December 1955, Voima was transferred back to the Finnish Maritime Administration.

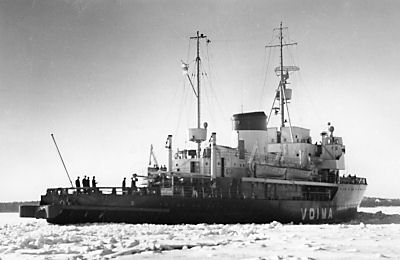
Voima breaking ice shortly after delivery

Although the commissioning of the new icebreaker did not go as planned, Voima still brought a long-awaited relief to the Finnish winter navigation. During the extremely difficult winter of 1956, she broke all previous records by escorting or otherwise assisting 616 icebound ships, among them the steam-powered icebreakers Sampo and Tarmo that had been immobilized by compressive pack ice. Voima also proved the superiority of two bow propellers in Baltic ice conditions and experiences from her first years in service were used to design the new Karhu-class icebreakers in the late 1950s. Voima remained the most powerful icebreaker in the Finnish state-owned fleet until the new 12,000 hp Tarmo-class icebreakers entered service in the mid-1960s.

=== Refitting ===
The rebuilding and expanding of the Finnish icebreaker fleet continued until all Finnish ports could be kept open year-round. In the late 1970s, the first post-war icebreakers were approaching either mid-life update or retirement. As a result, the 25-year-old Voima was extensively rebuilt by Wärtsilä Helsinki Shipyard in 1978–1979 at a cost of about FIM 86 million, 60 % of the price of a new icebreaker of comparable size. In the refit, Voima received new hull plating and additional ice-strengthening, new main engines and a completely new superstructure to accommodate the crew, and her propulsion motors and electrical systems were completely refurbished. After the refit, Voima was practically a new ship with only web frames, bottom plating, forepeak and propellers remaining from the original ship and, at 14,000 shaft horsepower, the third most powerful icebreaker of Finland at the time. She returned to service on 10 October 1979.

During the refit, the hull of Voima was painted bright red in order to improve the ship's visibility in fog. However, the experiment was not continued after the first five-year period, and in the mid-1980s she was painted back to the traditional colors.

=== Later career ===
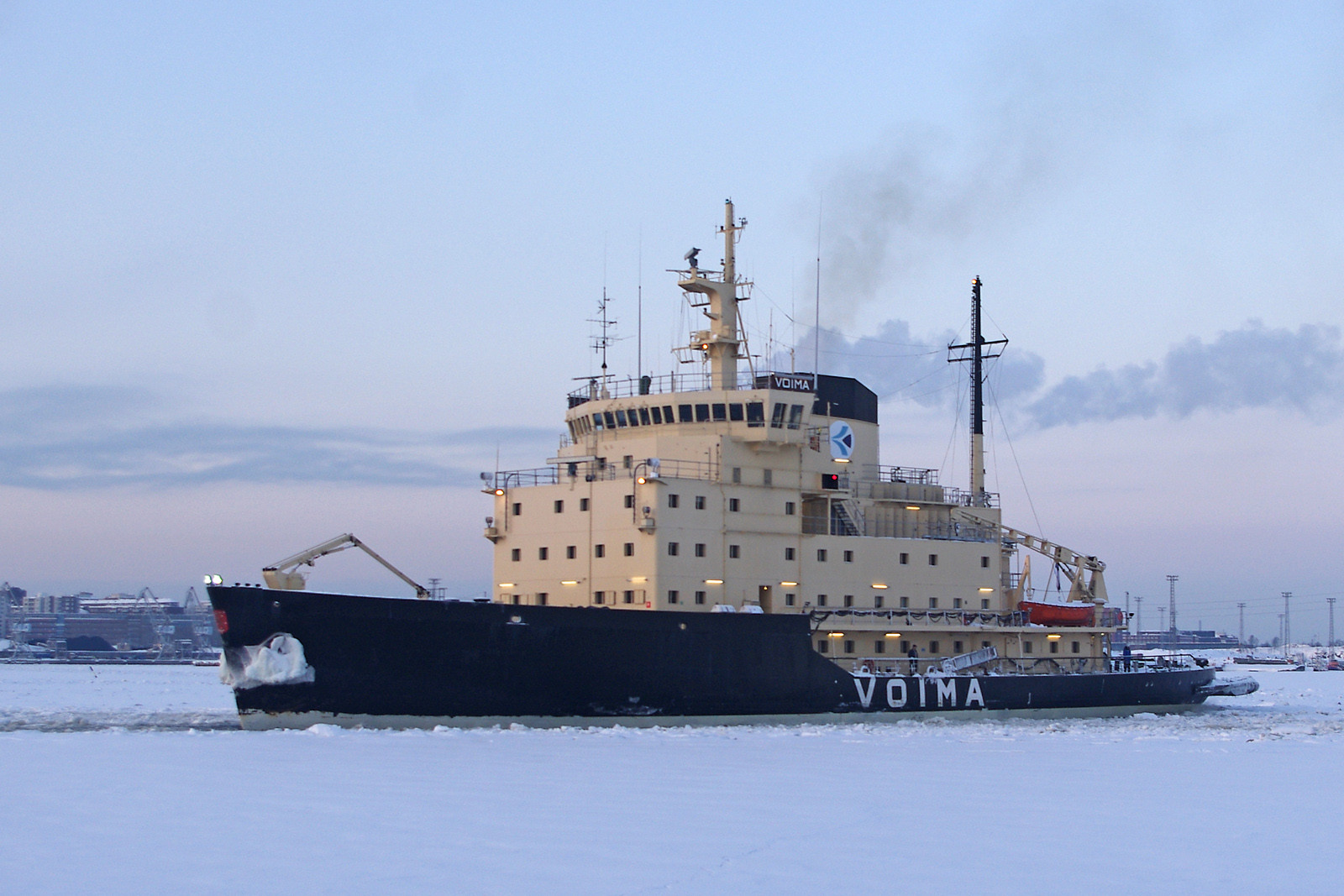
Voima leaving Helsinki on 2 February 2010

After the late 1970s refit, Voima resumed her duties as an escort icebreaker. As more powerful icebreakers entered service in the 1980s and 1990s, she has operated mainly in the Gulf of Finland. During the particularly mild winters of 1995 and 2002, she remained at stand-by at Katajanokka through the winter. Although Voima had been involved in minor collisions and other incidents in the past, she had not been grounded until 11 April 2003, when she ran aground while assisting a small German cargo ship in difficult conditions outside Helsinki. However, there were only minor dents in the hull plating and some damage to the bow propeller blades, which were repaired at Vuosaari shipyard on 14–17 April.

Following the reorganization of the Finnish Maritime Administration in 2004, the ownership and management of the state-owned vessels was transferred to a newly founded state-owned enterprise, Finstaship. Since 2010, the Finnish state-owned icebreakers have been owned and operated by the state-owned shipping company Arctia through its subsidiary, Arctia Icebreaking.

As of 2019, Voima is the oldest and smallest state-owned icebreaker in service in Finland. She is also technically the oldest icebreaker in the world still in active service, although after her extensive refit in the late 1970s not much remains of the ship launched in 1952.

=== Future ===
In 2008, the Finnish Maritime Administration announced that it would start planning a replacement for Voima. However, the new icebreaker that was expected to cost 100-120 million euro was not included in the budget proposals until 2012. While Arctia Shipping, the state-owned shipping company that operates the Finnish icebreaker fleet, stated that the company would prefer to replace the retiring traditional icebreakers with new multipurpose ships that could be chartered to support offshore drilling during the summer months, the Finnish Minister of Transport Merja Kyllönen voiced her opposition to a ship that would be 50% more expensive to build than a traditional icebreaker. There is also a growing public opposition to Arctic drilling which could result in an ecological disaster in case of a major oil spill. Some Finnish politicians have even proposed that instead of purchasing a new icebreaker to replace Voima, Finland should try to manage with a smaller icebreaker fleet and accept that some ports would likely be closed during the coldest winters.

In April 2013, the Finnish Transport Agency awarded the design contract for the new icebreaker to the Finnish engineering companies Aker Arctic and ILS. On 22 January 2014, the construction of the 125 million euro vessel was awarded to Arctech Helsinki Shipyard. The new state-owned icebreaker would be designed to be able to move continuously in level ice with a thickness of 1.6 metres (5.2 ft) and reach an average speed of 9 to 11 knots (17 to 20 km/h; 10 to 13 mph) during escort operations in the Baltic Sea. The vessel would also be powered by dual-fuel engines capable of using liquefied natural gas (LNG) as fuel. In addition to icebreaker duties, the new vessel would be fitted for emergency towing and oil spill response. Initially, the new icebreaker was expected to replace Voima starting from the winter of 2015–16. However, when the vessel was ordered on 22 January 2014, it was stated that it would instead primarily replace the Atle-class icebreaker Frej that the Finnish government has charted from Sweden. Thus, Voima was expected to remain in at least limited service after the new icebreaker had been delivered.

In 2016, Voima was drydocked for a service life extension that, according to Arctia, would extend the lifetime of the vessel by "at least ten years".

In August 2026, the Finnish Transport Infrastructure Agency awarded the construction of Voima's replacement to Helsinki Shipyard which is set to begin production in 2027 and deliver the new icebreaker by September 2029.

== Technical details ==
=== General characteristics ===
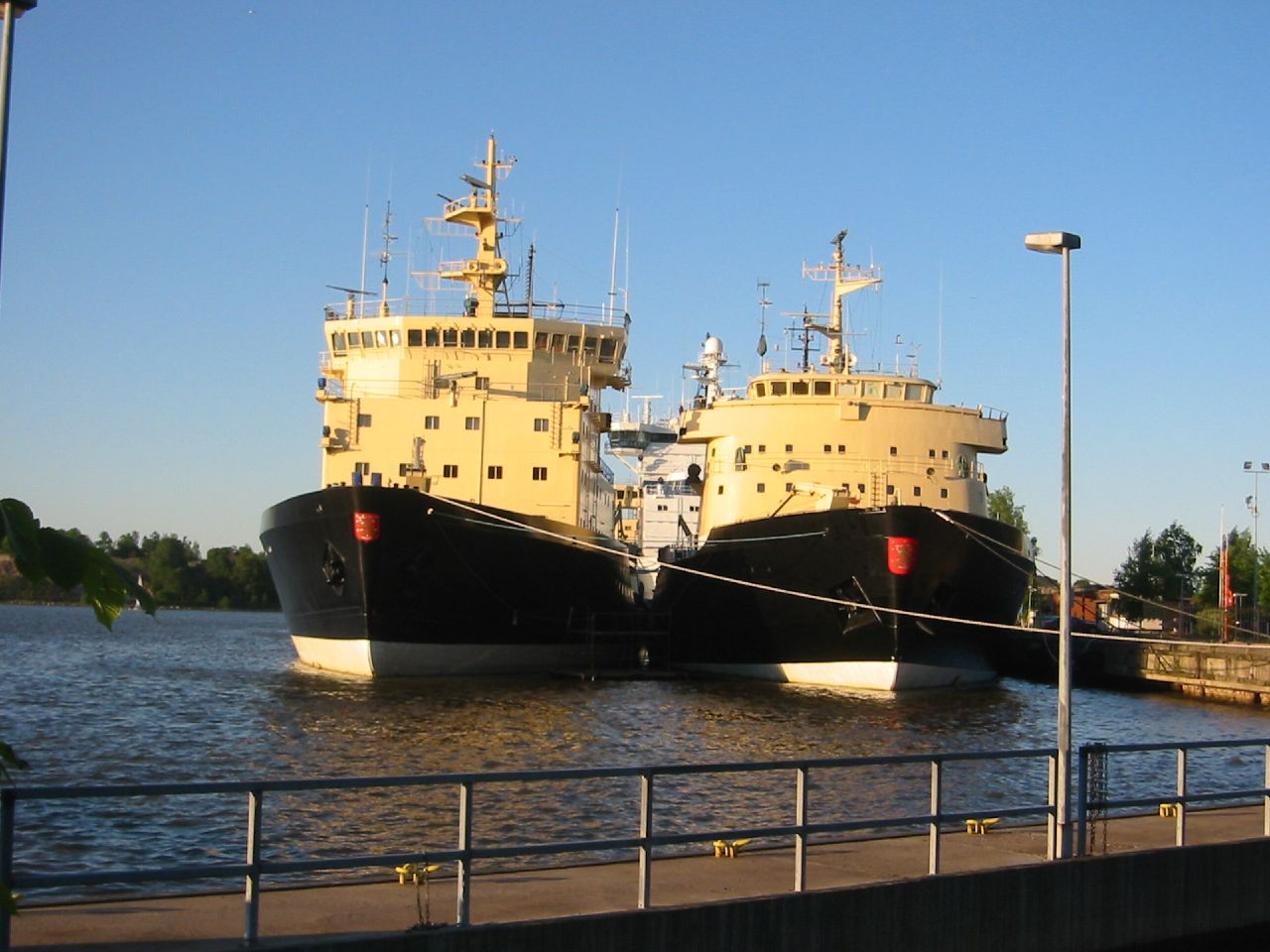
Voima (left) moored next to Apu in 2005. Prior to the refit, her superstructure resembled that of the other icebreaker.

With an overall length of 83.5 metres (273 ft 11 in) and a moulded beam of 19.4 metres (63 ft 8 in), Voima was once the longest and widest icebreaker ever built in Finland. At a draft of 6.4 metres (21 ft 0 in), her waterline measures 77.5 metres (254 ft 3 in) in length and she can break a channel with a width of 18.7 metres (61 ft 4 in). Although her refit increased the draft of the ship to 7 metres (23 ft 0 in) and displacement from 4,415 tons to 5,209 tons, she is now the smallest and lightest of the Finnish state-owned icebreakers. Voima was built to the highest ice class at the time, Lloyd's Register 1A, with a fully welded hull and shell plating measuring 27 to 30 millimetres (1.1 to 1.2 in) in thickness in the ice belt. Her ice strengthening was further increased in the refit. While Voima holds the highest Finnish-Swedish ice class, 1A Super, it has hardly any meaning for icebreakers which are of considerably stronger build than merchant ships operating in their care.

Despite being the most advanced icebreaker in the world, Voima still looked aesthetically pleasing with her low, gently rounded hull and superstructure. Many of her features, such as the open bridge with covered bridge wings, could be traced back to the pre-war steam-powered icebreakers. She had two continuous decks and a long forecastle that contained most of the cabins and social areas for the crew of 58. Although Voima was built with two small cargo holds for storage purposes, most of the space under the main deck is occupied by the engine and propulsion motor rooms, making the icebreaker literally "a ship loaded with power". She also has eight heeling tanks that can be used to free the icebreaker from compressive pack ice. Like the steam-powered icebreakers built before the war, she was also fitted with deck gun mounts. During the refit, the old superstructure was completely removed and replaced with an angular deckhouse slightly resembling those of Sisu and Urho. The crew, now accommodated in individual cabins high in the superstructure away from the noises generated by the icebreaking process, was reduced to 44 due to advancing automation. Later the crew has been further reduced to 21.

=== Power and propulsion ===
When Voima was built, she was powered by six 1,500 kW (2,000 hp) 8-cylinder Atlas Polar K58M two-stroke diesel engines driving 1,370 kVA Strömberg direct current generators. The main engines were located in two separate engine rooms, three engines side-by-side, together with four 6-cylinder Atlas Polar K56E auxiliary engines producing 220 kW (300 hp) each. In the refit, the old engines were replaced with six modern 16-cylinder Wärtsilä 16V22 4-stroke medium-speed diesel engines, each producing 2,140 kW (2,870 hp) while coupled to Strömberg alternators rated at 2,700 kVA.

Prior to the refit, the propulsion power was fed to four direct current electric motors located in separate engine rooms, two in the stern and two in the bow, through an applied Ward Leonard drive system. The propulsion motors, rated at 3,550 hp (2,650 kW) each, were also produced by Strömberg and were the largest electric motors ever manufactured in Finland at the time. The main engines limited the combined shaft power of Voima to 7,800 kW (10,500 hp), of which two thirds of the available propulsion power was diverted to the bow propellers in severe ice conditions. In weak ice and mild ice conditions, the power ratio between the bow and stern propellers could be reversed as the latter have higher propulsion efficiency. The original propulsion motors were thoroughly refurbished in the refit and the diesel-electric powertrain was changed from DC/DC to AC/DC like in the newer Finnish icebreakers. Furthermore, the increased output of the main engines allowed full utilization of the available propulsion power, increasing the available shaft power to 10,240 kW (13,730 hp), thus making Voima the third most powerful state-owned icebreaker in Finland at the time. Her open water speed, around 16 knots (30 km/h; 18 mph), has remained the same after the refit, but with the new main engines she can break level ice with thickness of 1.2 metres (3 ft 11 in) at 2 knots (3.7 km/h; 2.3 mph). After the refit, the bollard pull of Voima was measured to be 113 tons.

The propeller shafts that connect the propulsion motors to the four-bladed steel propellers and the rudder stock all have a diameter of 400 millimetres (16 in). The 3.5-metre (11 ft 6 in) bow propellers weigh 8,360 kilograms (18,430 lb) while the bigger stern propellers have a diameter of 4.2-metre (13 ft 9 in) and weigh 9,800 kilograms (21,600 lb) each. Both the propellers and the propeller shafts were retained in the refit. The original steering arrangement, a single center rudder mounted at the sternpost, was also retained although newer icebreakers have twin rudders for improved manoeuvrability.

== Bibliography ==
- Auvinen, Visa (1983). Leijonalippu merellä. Pori: Satakunnan Kirjateollisuus Oy. ISBN 951-95781-1-0.
- Jääsalo, Helge (1980). Pohjoiset satamat auki. Kustanneosakeyhtiö Pohjoinen. ISBN 951-9152-17-2.
- Laurell, Seppo (1992). Höyrymurtajien aika. Jyväskylä: Gummerus Kirjapaino Oy. ISBN 951-47-6775-6.
- Kaukiainen, Yrjö (1992). Navigare Necesse—Merenkulkulaitos 1917–1992. Jyväskylä: Gummerus Kirjapaino Oy. ISBN 951-47-6776-4.
- Pohjanpalo, Jorma (1978). 100 vuotta Suomen talvimerenkulkua. Valtion painatuskeskus, Helsinki: Merenkulkuhallitus. ISBN 951-46-3661-9.
- Ramsay, Henrik (1949). Jääsaarron murtajat. Helsinki: Werner Söderström Osakeyhtiö (WSOY).
- Turunen, Ari; Partanen, Petja (2011). Raakaa voimaa—Suomalaisen jäänmurtamisen tarina. Jyväskylä: Atena Kustannus Oy. ISBN 978-951-796-762-4.
