= Tarmo (1907 icebreaker) =

Finnish icebreaker and museum ship launched in 1907

Coordinates: 60°28′24″N 26°56′39.4″E

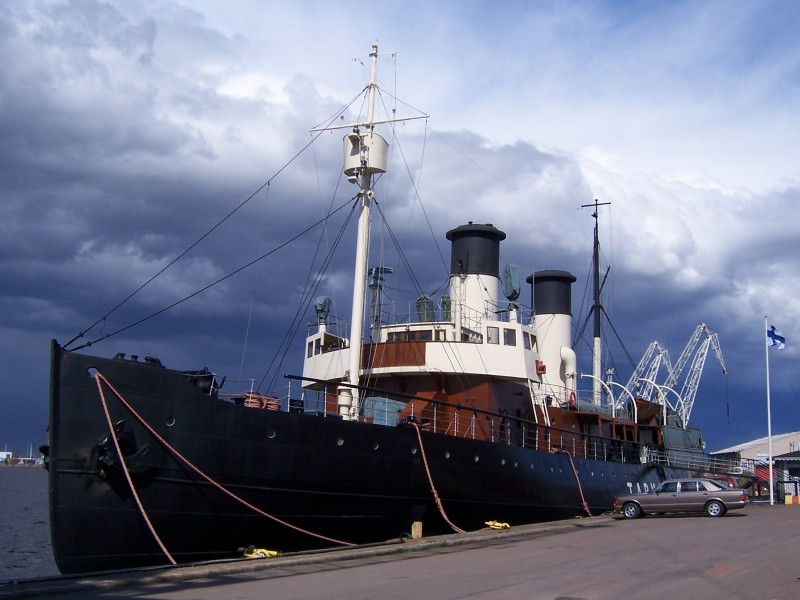
- Finnish icebreaker Tarmo at the Kotka Maritime Museum in 2006

History

Finland
- Name: 1907–1963: Tarmo; 1963–1969; 1970: Apu; 1969; 1970–: Tarmo
- Namesake: Finnish for "vigor" or "spirit"
- Owner: Finnish Board of Navigation (1907–1992); Finnish National Board of Antiquities (1992–)
- Port of registry: Helsinki, Finland
- Ordered: 15 February 1907
- Builder: Sir W.G. Armstrong, Whitworth & Co Ltd, Newcastle upon Tyne, United Kingdom
- Cost: FIM 1,631,548.81
- Launched: 9 September 1907
- Completed: 17 December 1907
- Commissioned: 4 January 1908
- Decommissioned: 29 May 1969; 1970
- In service: 1908–1970
- Identification: IMO number: 5352898
- Status: Museum ship in Kotka, Finland, since 1992

General characteristics
- Type: Icebreaker
- Tonnage: 1,574 GRT; 173 NRT
- Displacement: 2,400 tons
- Length: 67.10 m (220 ft 2 in) (overall); 64.15 m (210 ft 6 in) (waterline)
- Beam: 14.33 m (47 ft 0 in) (moulded); 14.00 m (45 ft 11 in) (waterline)
- Draft: 5.7 m (18 ft 8 in)
- Boilers: Five coal-fired boilers and one auxiliary boiler
- Engines: Two triple-expansion steam engines; 1,450 ihp (bow) and 2,400 ihp (stern)
- Propulsion: Bow and stern propellers
- Sail plan: Two masts; two staysails and two Bermuda sails
- Speed: 13 knots (24 km/h; 15 mph) in open water
- Endurance: Approximately one week in ice
- Crew: 43
- Armament: Armed during war

Tarmo is a Finnish steam-powered icebreaker preserved in the Maritime Museum of Finland in Kotka. Built in 1907 by Sir W.G. Armstrong, Whitworth & Co Ltd in Newcastle upon Tyne, United Kingdom, she was the third state-owned icebreaker of Finland and the last Finnish steam-powered icebreaker to remain in service. When Tarmo was decommissioned in 1970, a decision was made to preserve the vessel as a museum ship. After a long wait in Helsinki, Tarmo was towed to Kotka and completely restored in the early 1990s.

== Development and construction ==
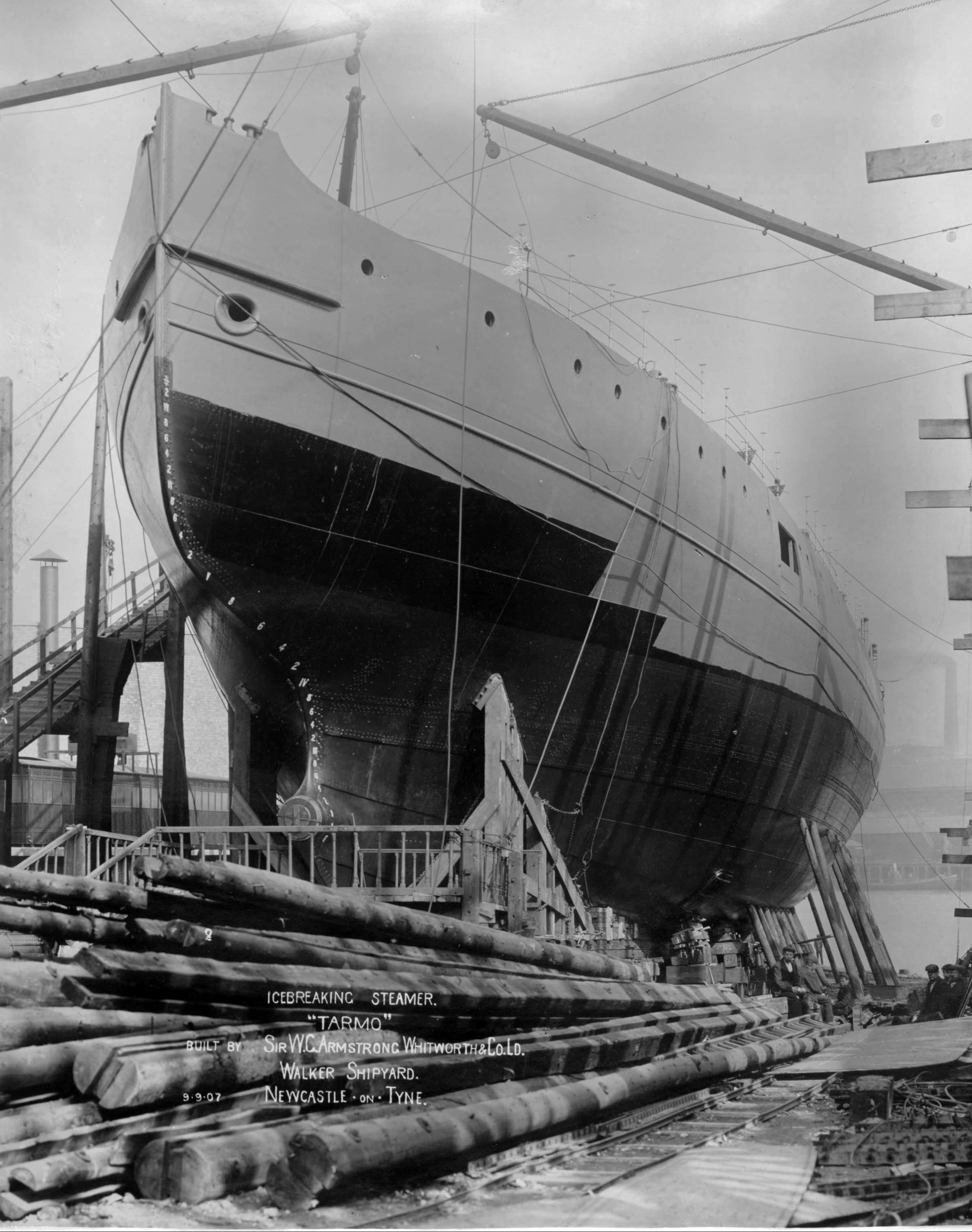
Tarmo at Armstrong Whitworth shipyard before launching.

The number of merchant ships calling at Finnish ports and requiring icebreaker assistance during the winter months had increased steadily since the first Finnish state-owned icebreakers, Murtaja and Sampo, were built in the 1890s. In 1902 General Nikolai Sjöman, the director of the Finnish Pilot and Lighthouse Authority, made a proposal to the Senate of Finland for the construction of the third state-owned icebreaker. While reluctant at first, in May 1906 the Senate announced that the old Murtaja could be replaced with a new icebreaker and a call for bids was sent to a number of suitable shipyards. On 4 September 1906 a decision was made to order a new icebreaker even though no buyer had been found for the old Murtaja.

By 1 November 1906 tenders for the construction of a new icebreaker, similar to but slightly larger than Sampo, had been received from four European shipyards. The most expensive tender, 1,608,900 Finnish markkas (FIM), was given by Friedrich Krupp Germaniawerft from Germany. It was followed by Sir W G Armstrong Whitworth & Co Ltd from England (FIM 1,575,000), Gourlay Brothers Ship Builders of Dundee from Scotland (FIM 1,432,500), and Burmeister & Wain from Denmark (FIM 1,422,500). When a fifth tender for FIM 1,485,000 was received from the English shipbuilder R. & W. Hawthorn Leslie and Company nine days after the deadline, Armstrong Whitworth lowered their bid by 100,000 markkas to FIM 1,475,000. Wärtsilä Hietalahti shipyard was also asked to participate in the call for tenders, but the domestic shipbuilding was not yet ready to accept such demanding projects and there were difficulties in acquiring and importing steel suitable for icebreakers. The tenders were evaluated by an expert committee appointed by the Senate and, after careful consideration, the icebreaker offered by Armstrong Whitworth turned out to be the most suitable. A number of changes were proposed to the original design including moving the bow propeller slightly abaft and upwards to protect it from grounding and improve the icebreaking characteristics of the ship by reducing the stem angle to 20 degrees. The shipbuilding contract was signed on 15 February 1907, and with the proposed changes the price of the vessel was 1,631,548.81 Finnish markkas.

The new icebreaker was launched on 9 September 1907 and given the name Tarmo, meaning "vigor" and "spirit" in the Finnish language. The ship was delivered on 17 December 1907 and on 30 December she left Newcastle under the command of Captain Leonard Melán and headed down the River Tyne to Hanko, Finland, where she arrived on 3 January 1908.

== Career ==
=== Early career ===
Tarmo was officially commissioned on 4 January 1908. Leonard Melán was replaced by Captain Johan Rosqvist, an experienced winter navigator known for his ability to predict the movements of ice fields with almost supernatural accuracy. However, the winter of 1908 was relatively mild and there was hardly any ice to break before the end of February. When the icebreaking capability of the new vessel could finally be assessed, it was found out that the new ship was not as maneuverable as the smaller and less powerful Sampo, and the changes made to the original design did not improve her performance. However, despite the shortcomings Tarmo was still a valuable addition to the state-owned icebreaker fleet, and after a number of changes her icebreaking characteristics were in par with Sampo.

In May 1908, Tarmo was sent for the first time to the Bothnian Bay to open the harbors and fairways for the spring. On 2 June, she was run hard aground near Raahe due to an error by a pilot when navigating by sight, resulting in extensive damage to the bottom plating and a lost propeller blade. Kept afloat by her own pumps, she returned to Raahe for emergency repairs and continued to Helsinki, where she was drydocked from 7 June until early August. In 1912 she was again run aground near Hanko, but the damage was not as extensive as on the first time.

During the 1910s, Tarmo assisted ships to the port of Helsinki and moved to Hanko with Sampo after the New Year. As the spring approached, she was sent first to the Gulf of Bothnia and finally to the eastern part of the Gulf of Finland to open the ports for the spring. However, during the winter months the icebreakers were not sent beyond Vaasa, partially due to the grounding of Tarmo outside Raahe in 1908.

=== First World War ===
In August 1914 Russia joined the First World War and navigating in the Baltic Sea became dangerous due to naval mines and German U-boats. The Finnish icebreakers were placed under the command of the Baltic Fleet of the Imperial Russian Navy and given the task of assisting naval ships and troop transportations in the Gulf of Finland. Despite the harsh winters, icebreaker assistance to merchant vessels was largely neglected, and several ships were destroyed by ice. The Russians armed Tarmo with one 47 mm deck gun.

=== Finnish Civil War ===
When the Parliament of Finland accepted the declaration of independence given by the Senate on 6 December 1917, the state-owned icebreakers under Finnish command raised the colours of the independent Finland for the first time. However, when the Red Guard took over Helsinki and the Finnish Civil War began on 27 January 1918, Tarmo was still under Russian command. After negotiations with the Central Committee of the Communist Party of the Soviet Union it was agreed that the Finnish icebreaker would be returned once the evacuation of the Russian forces – later known as the Ice Cruise of the Baltic Fleet – had been completed. However, after an attempt to evacuate the remaining members of the Senate from the occupied city by air had failed, Lieutenant Yrjö Roos was given an order to capture Tarmo from the Russians and bring her to a safe harbour at the Gulf of Bothnia. When the Germans captured the city of Tallinn on the other side of the Gulf of Finland, it was decided to take Tarmo there.

Tarmo had a crew of 42 under the command of Acting Captain Hjalmar Kauppi and eight armed Russian sailors commanded by Lieutenant Nicolai Telegin. After both commanders agreed with the takeover, Telegin obtained a forged travel order for Tarmo to head to the Gulf of Finland on 3 March 1918 to assist icebound Soviet transport ships. He also sent two of his soldiers ashore, reducing the number of enemy soldiers to six. Shortly before the departure, Roos brought Senators Pehr Evind Svinhufvud, the future President of Finland, and Jalmar Castrén to Tarmo disguised as engineers who had arrived to investigate ships damaged by ice. A small number of capturers had also hidden themselves on board the icebreaker on the previous night.

When the icebreaker was near the island of Aegna, the Finnish capturers cut the wireless antennas and stormed the Russian troops. Within minutes, the soldiers had been overpowered without casualties on either side and the ship was turned towards Tallinn. When a German plane was spotted approaching the ship, the capturers panicked as the largely red temporary state flag of Finland could be mistaken for the red Soviet revolutionary flag, and hastily replaced it with a large white tablecloth. The German pilot later commented that he would have attacked Tarmo had he not dropped all his bombs on the Soviet icebreaker Yermak earlier that day.

Tarmo was placed under German command and her armament was increased by two 75 mm deck guns. In addition to transporting German troops to Naissaar, she also participated in mine clearing operations in the Estonian west coast. On 25 March 1918, after the Finnish Senate had accepted military assistance from Germany, Tarmo was ordered to transport Finnish and German soldiers to the island of Suursaari. On 31 March, after having been immobilized by drifting ice for several days, the crew of Tarmo spotted a black cloud of smoke coming from the east. When the approaching ship was recognized as Yermak, the largest and most powerful Soviet icebreaker in service at that time, the deck guns were manned and around twenty shots were fired at the ship some 6 nautical miles (11 km; 6.9 mi) away. Yermak, which had been under fire from a coastal artillery battery at Lavansaari only a couple of days earlier, turned around and retreated without returning fire. This engagement has been considered the first time a naval ship flying the flag of independent Finland opened fire against an enemy ship.

When Tarmo returned to Tallinn, her crew was surprised to see another large icebreaker flying the Finnish flag moored at the harbour. The Soviet icebreaker Volynets had been captured only two days earlier and renamed Wäinämöinen. Both ships were used to transport 3,000 German soldiers – Detachment Brandenstein – to Loviisa. On 18 April 1918, Tarmo arrived in Helsinki and was handed back to the Finnish Board of Navigation.

=== Interwar period ===
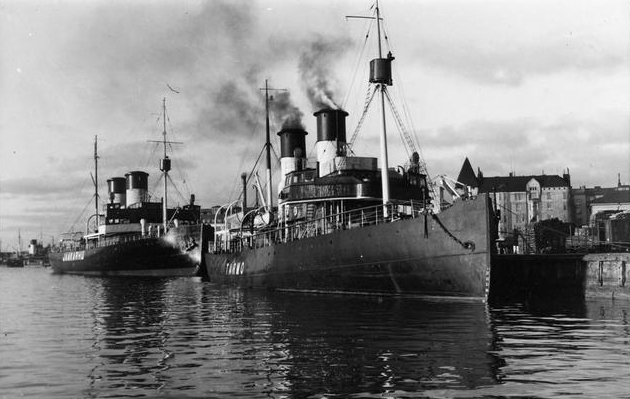
Finnish state-owned icebreakers Tarmo and Jääkarhu

During the interwar period Tarmo was stationed at the Gulf of Finland, where in addition to assisting ships she often had to rescue local fishermen trapped on drifting ice floes. In early 1919 she was used for transporting volunteers to Tallinn to aid with the Estonian War of Independence. She also transported Carl Gustaf Emil Mannerheim to Stockholm and Copenhagen in February 1919.

The interwar period also saw the expansion of the Finnish icebreaker fleet, first by two large steam-powered icebreakers Voima and Jääkarhu, and finally by the diesel-electric Sisu, which was the first large Finnish icebreaker built completely in Finland.

=== Second World War ===
==== Winter War ====
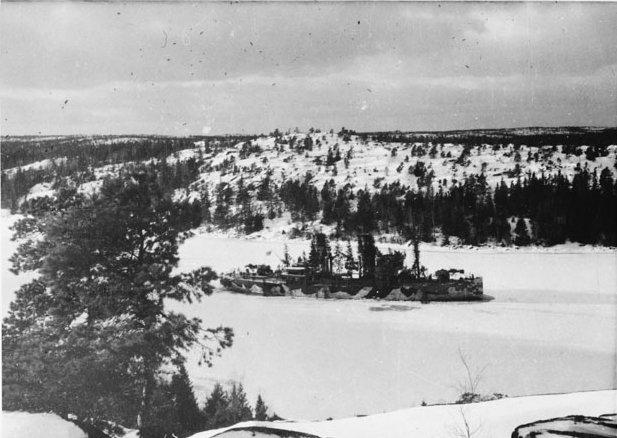
Tarmo in camouflage in 1939.

When relations with the Soviet Union deteriorated in late 1939, the Finnish state-owned icebreakers were again armed and assigned to a wartime icebreaker flotilla. Tarmo had been fitted with gun mounts already in 1931, and shortly before the Winter War began she was armed with four 120 mm (4.7 in) 50-caliber Vickers naval guns of Russian origin on two twin mounts. It was soon apparent that the guns, which were used on all large Finnish icebreakers, were not very suitable for naval use due to their relatively short range and slow rate of fire. On 11 January 1940, after spending the early days of the war near Turku, Tarmo was ordered to the Gulf of Finland because the ice conditions had become too severe for the smaller Murtaja. When the two icebreakers met in Helsinki on 13 January, a Madsen 20 mm anti-aircraft cannon was moved from Murtaja to Tarmo.

After the Soviet troops had captured the island of Sommers in December 1939, a small transport ship had become trapped in ice near the island. On 16 January Tarmo was ordered to sink the ship, Kazakhstan, before the Soviet icebreakers could release the icebound vessel. Tarmo left in the following night, but it was soon found out that the guns could not be aimed – when the temperature had dropped to −40 °C (−40 °F), the frozen storage grease had jammed the guns – and the icebreaker returned to Kotka. In the following night, after the guns had been thawed, Tarmo headed towards Sommers again. On the second sortie, she was also carrying 80 Finnish soldiers, who were to take back the island while the icebreaker bombarded the Soviet forces with her deck guns. When Tarmo was some ten miles from Sommers, her old rival from the previous war, the Soviet icebreaker Yermak, was spotted on the western side of the island.

When a thick cloud of black smoke was spotted on Yermak, the Soviet icebreaker turned back east without firing a shot and called in reinforcements – her crew had mistaken Tarmo for the Finnish coastal defence ship Väinämöinen and ordered an airstrike against the ship they thought to be the most powerful warship of the Finnish Navy. In the meantime Tarmo opened fire on Kazakhstan. However, the guns malfunctioned again and only two shells were fired from the stern gun at the Soviet ship some seven miles away, both of which fell short. Continuing the naval engagement without operational guns was deemed futile and a decision was made to turn back to Kotka and return once the guns could be used again. On the way back the Soviet fighters and bombers attacked Tarmo several times, but none of the planes scored a hit on the Finnish icebreaker due to intense anti-aircraft fire. Around half past noon Tarmo arrived in Kotka and lunch was served for the crew.

At 13:15 a lone Soviet bomber flying at 3,000 m (9,800 ft) dropped three 100 kg (220 lb) bombs on Tarmo. The first bomb missed the icebreaker and exploded harmlessly on ice in front of the ship, but the second hit the foredeck, destroying the anchors, and the third penetrated the wooden weather deck in front of the bridge and detonated on the tweendeck. The blast immediately killed 38 crew members and wounded ten, one of whom died later in hospital, and started a fire that quickly spread aft. By 18:00 the fire department had the blaze, which had ignited the ammunition stores and destroyed nearly all wooden parts from amidships aft, under control. The bow of Tarmo had been reduced to a pile of mangled pipes, twisted frames and torn plating, from which the twin barrels of the forward 120 mm guns were pointing to the sky. Her forward engine room was full of water that had frozen around the steam engine.

Despite the devastating damage, Tarmo had not developed any leaks following the bombing. Furthermore, her boilers and stern engine were intact, and by 8 February her bow engine was running again as well. The damaged steel structures were cut at tweendeck level and the 120 mm deck guns were removed. On 9 February Tarmo left for Helsinki for further repairs under her own power. However, as the wheelhouse had been destroyed, the helmsman was stationed in the aft engine room and the commands were shouted through the skylight. Due to the ever-present danger of Soviet airstrikes, Tarmo moved only at night and spent the days camouflaged. Since the navigational aids could not be lit up during the war, a ski patrol moved in front of the icebreaker and used flashlights and tree branches to guide the ship through the archipelago. Tarmo arrived at Hietalahti shipyard on 10 February. Her bow was rebuilt only to the tweendeck level, the cabin of the first mate was turned into a bomb shelter with 10-millimetre (0.4 in) armour plates, and the armament was increased by two Bofors 40 mm guns and one 47 mm gun.

After the repairs were finished on 8 March 1940, Tarmo was ordered to Vyborg Bay to break ice in front of advancing Soviet troops and tanks. When the icebreaker left for the mission on 10 March, it was soon found out that her icebreaking capability had been significantly reduced, and by afternoon she had not even passed the fort of Suomenlinna outside Helsinki. The following day, after having been attacked by Soviet fighters several times, Tarmo turned back to Helsinki; she had advanced only 16 nmi (30 km; 18 mi) in two days but had nearly exhausted her coal stores and anti-aircraft munitions. When she arrived in Helsinki on 12 March 1940, the Moscow Peace Treaty had been signed and the Winter War was over.

==== Interim Peace ====
During the period which later became known as the Interim Peace, Tarmo was disarmed and her armour was removed. Already on 13 March 1940 she was sent to Hanko to open a channel to the icebound harbour, but was unable to break through the pack ice fields and had to return to Helsinki. Later most of the damage the icebreaker had suffered during the war was repaired. In addition to rebuilding the bridge, the crew accommodation was improved considerably.

==== Continuation War ====
When the Continuation War started in June 1941, the state-owned icebreakers were again armed and assigned to the icebreaker flotilla. After spending the summer months guarding fairways in the Archipelago Sea, icebreakers Tarmo and Jääkarhu participated in Operation Nordwind together with Finnish and German naval ships on 13 September 1941. The joint Finnish-German distraction manoeuvre was a complete failure. Not only did it fail to achieve its goal – it is uncertain if the Soviet forces even noticed the fleet – but when the ships turned back, paravanes dragged a Soviet naval mine against the hull of Finnish coastal defence ship Ilmarinen, the flagship of the Finnish Navy, which sank in seven minutes following the explosion, claiming 271 lives.

When the Soviet forces retreated from Hanko by the end of 1941 and the fighting moved outside the Finnish borders, the icebreaker flotilla was disbanded and Tarmo resumed her normal peacetime duties as an escort icebreaker. During the extremely difficult winter of 1942, Tarmo assisted 177 vessels and sailed 8,957 nautical miles (16,588 km; 10,308 mi), more than any other Finnish icebreaker during the season. After saving the crew and cargo of German steamer Helgoland, which was damaged by ice and later sank, Captain Yrjö Malmi was awarded the Order of the German Eagle by Adolf Hitler. The winters of 1943 and 1944 were easier and several ports were kept open through the winter.

After the Continuation War ended with the signing of the Moscow Armistice on 19 September 1944, Finland had to hand over the newest state-owned icebreakers, Jääkarhu and Voima, to the Soviet Union as war reparations. Other icebreakers, including Tarmo, were used to tow Soviet naval ships and submarines through the Finnish archipelago during the latter stages of the Second World War.

=== Post-war years and decommissioning ===
During the first post-war years the war-worn Finnish state-owned icebreaker fleet, reduced to four steam-powered icebreakers and the diesel-electric Sisu, was overburdened with work. Due to the lack of modern tonnage, all available ships were taken into use, and during the winter months this meant a large number of older ships with low engine power and inadequate ice-strengthening. In 1946, Tarmo lost her rudder and the whole sternpost while assisting ships in the Archipelago Sea. Using the bow and stern propellers to steer the icebreaker, Captain Malmi managed to return to Helsinki – a voyage of 150 nautical miles (280 km; 170 mi) – and even enter the drydock without assistance from tugboats.

The boilers of Tarmo were converted for heavy fuel oil in 1950, which increased her endurance from one week to more than one month in normal ice conditions and quadrupled her range. Furthermore, the number of stokers tending the boilers could be reduced from 15 to 9. Her superstructure was also expanded and the crew accommodation was brought up to modern standards. However, as late as in 1952 she still lacked a gyrocompass, echosounder and even a radar, all of which were standard equipment on board the merchant ships she assisted during the winter months.

Once the war reparations to the Soviet Union had been paid, the rebuilding of the Finnish state-owned icebreaker fleet began with the commissioning of the new Voima in 1954. When the harsh winters of the 1950s showed that more modern icebreakers were needed, a series of slightly smaller diesel-electric icebreakers were built for operations within the archipelago, and one by one the old steam-powered icebreakers were decommissioned and scrapped. From 1960 Tarmo was the only state-owned steam-powered icebreaker in service.

When the new diesel-electric Tarmo was commissioned in 1963, the old Tarmo was renamed Apu and handed over to the Finnish Navy. In 1964, she spent two months in Tallinn as an accommodation ship for the crews of Riga class frigates Hämeenmaa and Uusimaa that had been recently purchased from the Soviet Union. In 1966, Apu was handed back to the Finnish Maritime Administration and resumed her icebreaker duties until the commissioning of the next diesel-electric icebreaker, Varma, in 1968. Apu was decommissioned in the following spring, but instead of scrapping her it was decided to turn the last Finnish steam-powered icebreaker into a museum ship. On 29 May 1969 she was moored at Hylkysaari next to the Helsinki Zoo and given back her original name.

However, the retirement of Tarmo did not go as planned. The winter of 1970 turned out to be very harsh and the old icebreaker had to be recommissioned. After her propellers had been re-installed in the Suomenlinna drydock, Tarmo was again renamed Apu and ordered to the Archipelago Sea to escort icebound ships. However, her efforts were often described being "mostly of moral nature", and in the spring of 1970 she was returned to her moorings at Hylkysaari. When the new diesel-electric Apu was commissioned in the summer of 1970, it was certain that the old icebreaker could finally be retired.

=== Museum ship ===
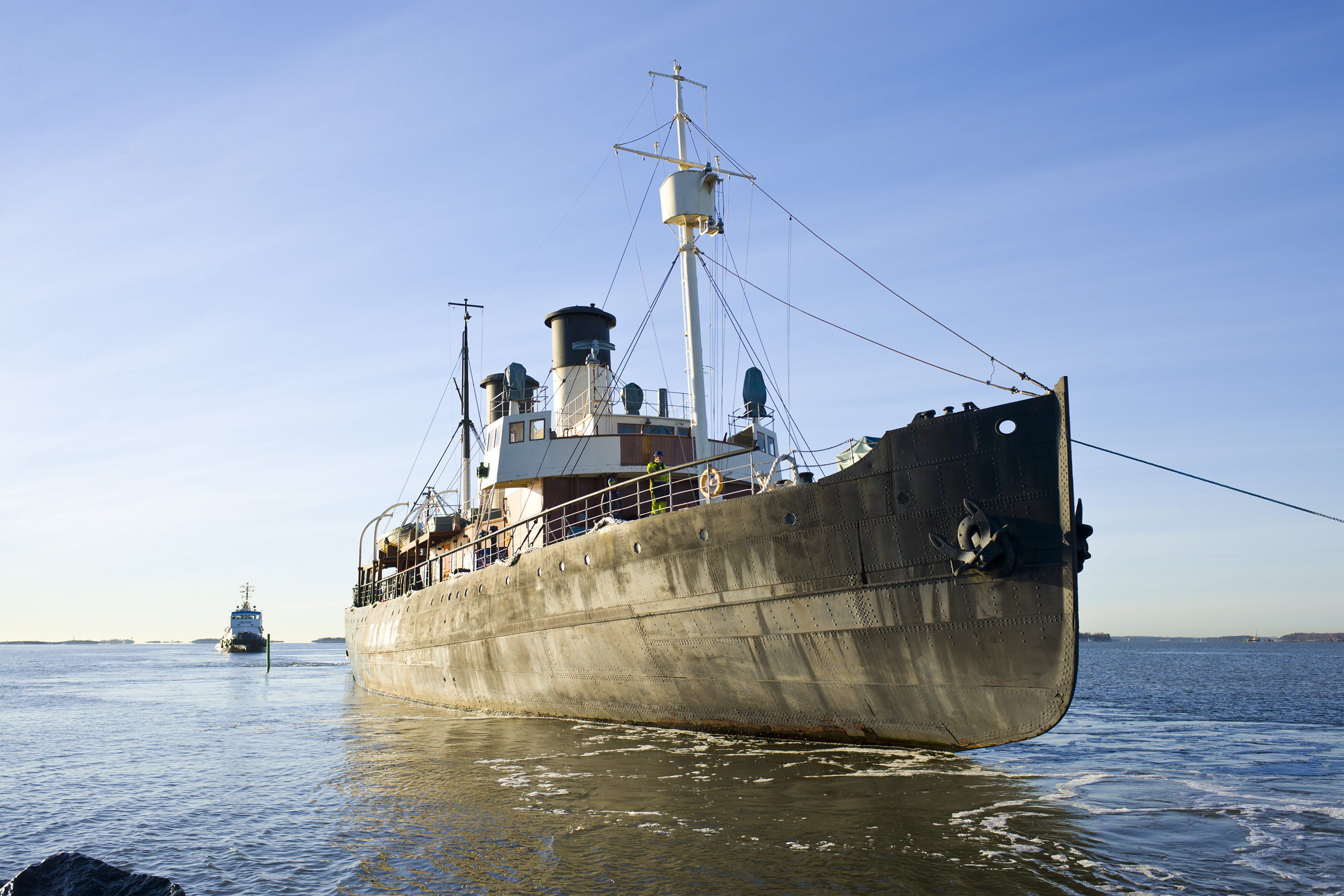
Tarmo being towed to Suomenlinna dry dock on 29 November 2016 after having been afloat for 24 years.

It took nearly 20 years until Tarmo was finally restored. In the 1970s and 1980s the Finnish Board of Navigation used its limited funding to maintain the ship in floating condition and the Maritime Historical Society of Finland tried to raise restoration funds, but despite the preservation efforts the wooden interior fittings and weather decks deteriorated over the years.

When the Cabinet of Finland allotted two million Finnish markkas for the restoration of the old icebreaker, Tarmo was towed to Kotka in November 1990. After her interiors had been extensively documented and photographed, all fittings and furnishing were removed and stored ashore. When Tarmo was drydocked for inspection, her bottom plating was found out to be in surprisingly good condition. The deteriorated weather decks and aftship cabins were completely rebuilt.

Although the engine rooms, boiler rooms and machinery workshops remain largely in their initial configuration and one officer cabin on the tweendeck was spared by the fire in the 1940s, the aim of the restoration work was never to return Tarmo to her original condition. Instead, she was rebuilt as she appeared after her last major refit in 1951, although with modern heating and air conditioning systems. Her hold was turned into an exhibition space and a cafeteria was opened in the crew mess. Although she was not repaired to operational condition – her stern engine was decoupled from the propeller shaft and equipped with an electrical turning gear – there are no permanent changes that would prevent her from ever sailing under her own power.

The restoration work was completed on 19 May 1992 and a couple of days later the Board of Navigation handed the old icebreaker over to the Finnish National Board of Antiquities. Since then she has been moored in Kotka as part of the permanent exhibition of the Maritime Museum of Finland.

Tarmo was drydocked during the winter of 2016–2017 for the first time in 24 years after the Parliament of Finland granted 950,000 euro for the renovation project. She was towed to Suomenlinna in November 2016 and returned to Kotka in May 2017. Based on initial assessment, the hull of the icebreaker is still in good condition, but for example the wooden boat deck had to be rebuilt.

Tarmo is often incorrectly reported to be the world's oldest surviving icebreaker even though there are at least two vessels that predate her: the 1894-built Swedish icebreaker Bore in Malmö and the Russian icebreaker Angara, built in 1900, that has been preserved as a museum ship in Irkutsk. However, she is older than the other preserved icebreakers in the Baltic Sea, Sankt Erik in Sweden, Krasin in Russia and Suur Tõll in Estonia.

== Technical details ==
Tarmo is almost identical to the older Sampo in terms of structural layout and general arrangements, but she was built with a number of minor modifications such as a smaller stem angle of 20 degrees. She is also slightly larger than the older icebreaker, having an overall length of 67.10 metres (220 ft 2 in), waterline length of 64.15 metres (210 ft 6 in), and moulded breadth of 14.33 metres (47 ft 0 in), both slightly greater than those of Sampo. When loaded to an average draft of 5.7 metres (18 ft 8 in), Tarmo has displacement of 2,400 tons, some 350 tons more than that of her predecessor. Both Tarmo and Sampo were served by a crew of 43.

Tarmo was powered by two triple-expansion steam engines manufactured in Wallsend, one driving a propeller in the stern and the other a second propeller in the bow. The main function of the bow propeller was to reduce friction between the hull and the ice although the exact details of the icebreaking process were not known at that time. The stern engine produced 1,700 ihp at 97 rpm and the bow engine 1,300 ihp at 107 rpm, but for short periods of time they could put out 2,400 ihp at 98 rpm and 1,450 ihp at 120 rpm, respectively. This made her considerably more powerful than Sampo, whose two engines had together produced only 3,052 ihp during sea trials and were rated at 2,800 ihp. Tarmo could maintain a speed of 13 knots (24 km/h; 15 mph) in open water, typical for icebreakers of her type at that time. Like all icebreakers of her age, Tarmo was also equipped with sails – two staysails and two Bermuda sails – although they were rarely, if ever, used. In the early 1930s, the sails were cut up piece by piece for other uses and eventually disappeared from the inventory.

Tarmo had five coal-fired boilers for the main engines in two boiler rooms and a small auxiliary boiler for heating, deck equipment and electricity generation. Her midship fuel stores could hold 450 tons of coal, which was fed to the fireboxes at a rate of 3–4 tons per hour by six stokers and was enough for roughly one week of sailing in ice.

Like the other Finnish state-owned icebreakers, Tarmo was equipped for escort icebreaker duties with a towing winch, a cable and a stern notch. In difficult ice conditions the ship being assisted was taken into tow, and in extremely difficult compressive ice it was pulled to the icebreaker's stern notch. For salvage operations Tarmo had a powerful centrifugal pump capable of pumping water simultaneously through nine thick hoses.
