= Kapitan Belousov =

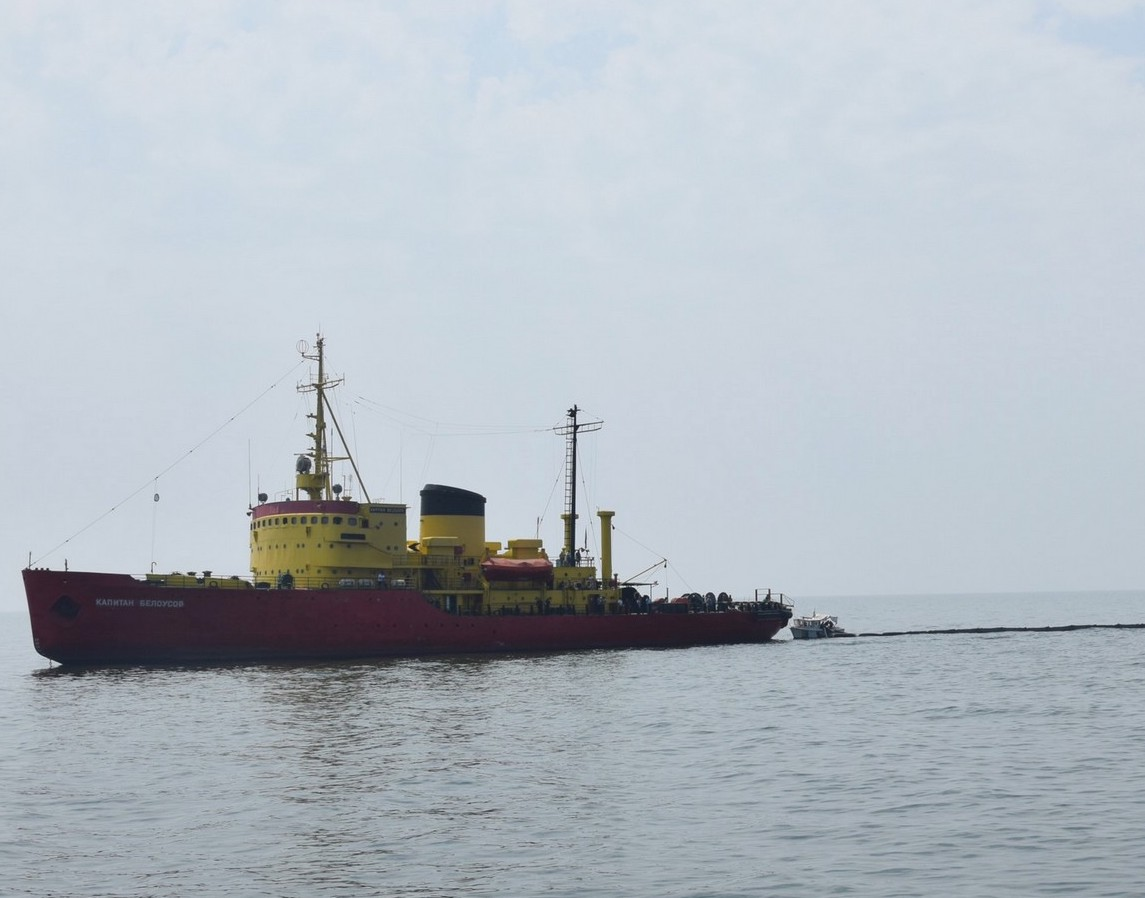
- Kapitan Belousov in the Port of Mariupol, 2021

History

→ → Soviet Union → Ukraine → Russia
- Name: Kapitan Belousov
- Namesake: Mikhail Prokofievich Belousov
- Owner: Murmansk Shipping Company (1955–1975); Azov Shipping Company (1975–2004); Port of Mariupol (2004–present)
- Port of registry: Murmansk, Soviet Union (1955–1975); Mariupol, Soviet Union/Ukraine (1975–2022); Taganrog, Russia (2022–present)
- Builder: Wärtsilä Helsinki shipyard (Helsinki, Finland)
- Yard number: 353
- Launched: 15 December 1953
- Identification: IMO number: 5181598
- Nickname(s): "на усах"
- Status: In service

General characteristics
- Type: Icebreaker
- Displacement: 5,360 t (5,280 long tons)
- Length: 83.16 m (273 ft)

Kapitan Belousov (Russian: Капитан Белоусов; Ukrainian: Капітан Бєлоусов) is a Russian icebreaker. The ship is one of three diesel-electric icebreakers built for the Soviet Union by Wärtsilä at the Hietalahti shipyard located in Helsinki, Finland. The ship is named after the sea captain and Hero of the Soviet Union Mikhail Prokofievich Belousov.

Kapitan Belousov is the only ship of its class remaining in service, with Kapitan Voronin and Kapitan Mehelov being retired from service in 1996 and 1994, respectively.

== Design and construction ==
Kapitan Belousov is one of three ships built by Wärtsilä for the Soviet Union (along with Kapitan Voronin and Kapitan Melehov). The design of the ships were heavily influenced by the previously built Finnish icebreaker Voima. Following these three vessels, another ship named Oden was built for the Swedish Maritime Administration.

Kapitan Belousov was launched on 15 December 1953 in Helsinki, Finland with Finnish and Soviet representatives present.

== Service history ==
=== Murmansk Shipping Company ===
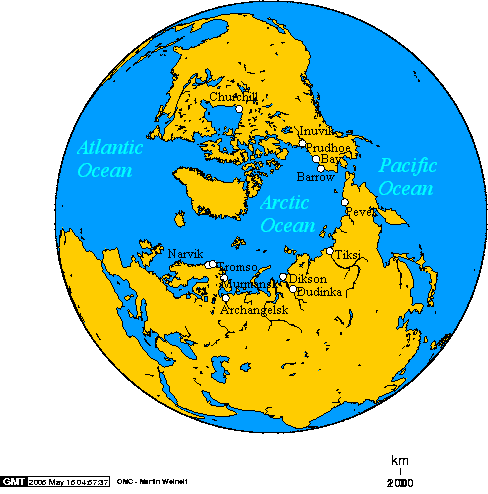
Arctic Ocean Seaports

In 1955, Kapitan Belousov entered service with the Murmansk Shipping Company.

Kapitan Belousov carried out a search and rescue mission after the crash of a Soviet Polar Aviation Mi-4 helicopter in Zemlya Georga on 30 July 1955. The crash site was discovered, and several survivors were rescued.

The year of 1957 would be particularly eventful for Kapitan Belousov. In the summer of the year, the vessel departed Murmansk for escort duties in the Northern Sea Route, rendezvoused with freighters at Dikson and proceeded east beyond the Vilkitsky Strait. Shortly after, Kapitan Belousov ran into a shoal at full speed resulting in significant damage to its propellers and shaft, as well as the hull being holed. Even with assistance from the icebreaker Admiral Makarov, the ship was unable to leave the shoal, only being freed after hauling sideways with great difficulty. Despite the extensive damage, the ship continued to operate as returning to port was not possible. Not long later, the ship was caught in ice, along with the ships Kirovograd, Sibiryakov and Kapitan Voronin. Provisions and crew were bought to and from the ships by aircraft landing on the nearby ice fields, coordinated by the head of the Chief Directorate of the Northern Sea Route Vasily Burkhanov. The ships attempted to reach Tiksi, but were trapped and wintered until the ice began to thaw. With the assistance of Soviet Long Range Aviation the ships were repaired by divers in the freezing water conditions, with bombers transporting a propeller shaft, hubs and blades from the mainland. Kapitan Belousov returned to Murmansk in the fall of 1958, having spent a year and a half at sea.

In the winter of 1970, an experimental shipping convoy took place on the Northern Sea Route. At the time the Norilsk Mining and Metallurgical Combine was experiencing significant growth. To meet demand, the a pilot voyage was proposed between Arkhangelsk, Dudinka and Murmansk amidst severe weather conditions. The convoy departed Arkhangelsk from 10 November, arrived in Dudinka on 19 November, and completed the voyage in Murmansk on 3 December 1970, consisting of the freighter Gizhiga, the nuclear icebreaker Lenin, and the diesel icebreakers Kapitan Belousov, Kapitan Voronin and Murmansk. The voyage was further supported by Ilyushin Il-14 and Antonov An-24 aircraft. The unprecedented voyage proved the feasibility of reliable Arctic navigation, laying the groundwork for future Soviet and Russian activity in the Northern Sea Route.

=== Azov Shipping Company ===
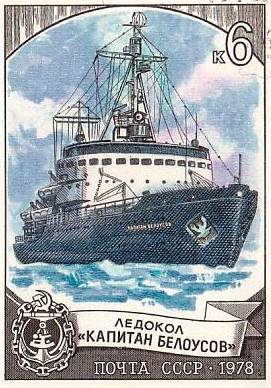
Soviet postage stamp

The icebreaker served in the Arctic until 1975, when the ship was transferred to the Sea of Azov, with its port of registration changed to the city of Zhdanov (now reverted to the name of Mariupol).

Despite severe weather in the year of 1984, the Azov Shipping Company suffered no significant losses of shipping, with the assistance of Kapitan Belousov, Kapitan Kosolapov, Vladimir Rusanov and Kerchensky-1.

In 1992, Ukraine seceded from the Soviet Union, with Kapitan Belousov being transferred to Ukrainian ownership due to its port of registry being located in the newly independent country.

In 2004 the National Bank of Ukraine issued a five hryvnia commemorative coin depicting Admiral Belousov. The coin used the Ukrainian spelling Капітан Белоусов and depicts the ship in its contemporary livery, with a black hull, yellow superstructure and tryzub on the ships funnel. Following the bankruptcy and liquidation of the Azov Shipping Company in the same year, the ship was transferred to the Port of Mariupol.

=== Port of Mariupol ===
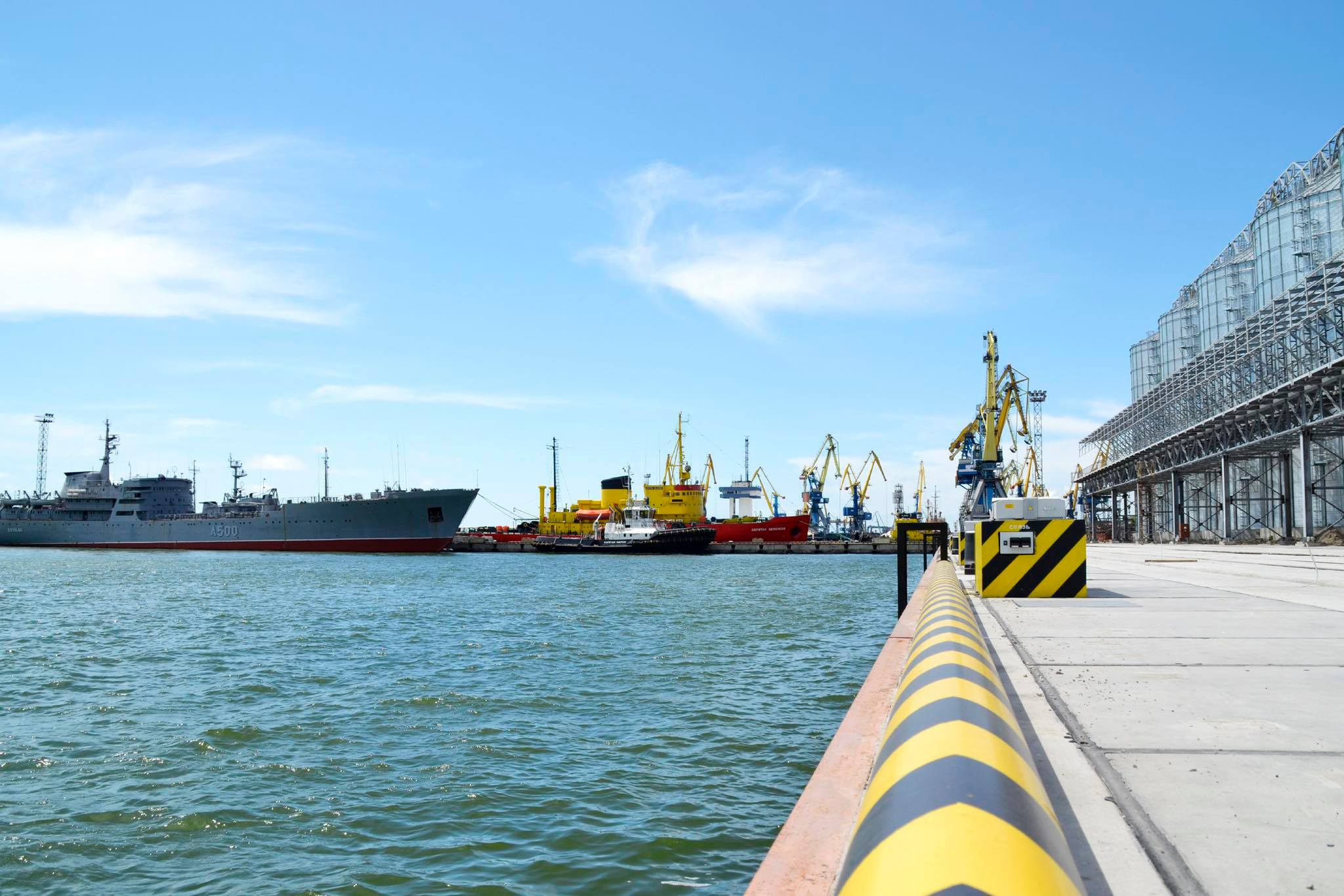
Kapitan Belousov in the Port of Mariupol alongside the ice-tug Kapitan Markin and the Ukrainian Navy ship Donbas.

By 2008, the vessels engines had reached the end of their usable life, with the ship only operating in clear weather conditions with the help of ice tugs. In response, the vessel underwent an overhaul at the Azov Shipyard in 2009. New Caterpillar marine diesel engines were installed by Damen Group. As a result, the power rating of the ship increase to 12000 hp and a speed of 14 knots.

In 2020, the vessel underwent repairs at the Azov Shipyard.

In 2021, news media were invited aboard the ship by the ships master, veteran of the Northern Sea Route and Mariupol resident Captain Tchaikovsky. Images show the ship repainted in a red and yellow livery. In a frustrated manner, Tchaikovsky lamented the collapse and disappearance of the Ukrainian maritime fleet.

On 8 April 2022, the Azov Regiment reported that the ship had been shelled, posting a taunting message with an image of the ship on fire.

In May 2022, Kapitan Belousov came under the control of Russian forces following the Siege of Mariupol. Several members of the crew remained, including the captain. During the siege, the ship had been hit with two shells, causing damage and the death of one crew member, as well as several injuries. Captain Tchaikovsky the ships master, accused the Ukrainian Azov Regiment of shelling the vessel.

In 2023, Kapitan Belousov returned to service in Mariupol, alongside the ice-tugs Kapitan Markin and Kapitan Merkulov.

In mid 2025, an exhibition was opened at Mariupol railway station named Through Ice and Time: the History of the Icebreaker "Captain Belousov". Later in December 2025, the ship returned to service after repair and overhaul work was completed, with support from the Russian Maritime Register of Shipping. In particular, a comprehensive overhaul of the ships auxiliary steam boilers was carried out.

== In culture ==
Kapitan Belousov is mentioned in the books A Passenger Without a Ticket by Georgiy Daneliya and At Sea by Viktor Konetsky.

== See also ==
- Port of Mariupol
