= Murtaja (1890 icebreaker) =

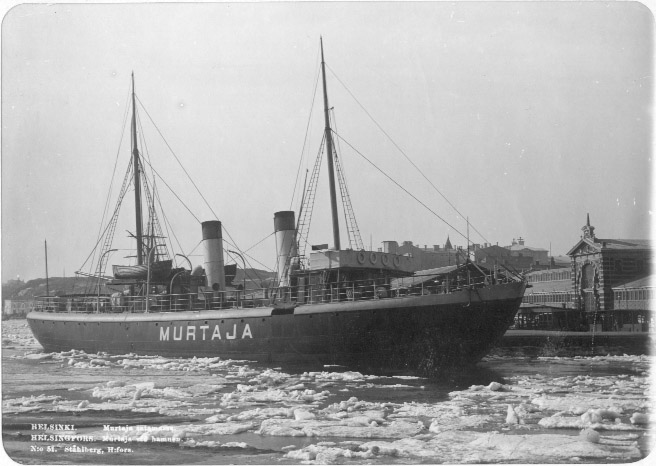
- Murtaja at the port of Helsinki in the 1890s.

History

Finland
- Name: Murtaja
- Namesake: Finnish for "icebreaker"
- Owner: Finnish Board of Navigation
- Port of registry: Helsinki
- Ordered: 25 May 1889
- Builder: Bergsunds Mekaniska Verkstads AB, Stockholm, Sweden
- Cost: 445,000 Swedish kronor
- Launched: 23 December 1889
- Completed: 30 March 1890
- Decommissioned: 3 May 1958
- In service: 1890–1958
- Fate: Broken up in 1958

General characteristics
- Type: Icebreaker
- Tonnage: 676 GRT
- Displacement: 930 tons
- Length: 47.55 m (156.00 ft) (overall); 42.50 m (139.44 ft) (waterline)
- Beam: 10.95 m (35.93 ft) (moulded); 10.80 m (35.43 ft) (waterline)
- Draught: 5.5 m (18 ft) (even keel); 6.55 m (21.5 ft) (stern)
- Boilers: Four coal-fired boilers
- Engine: Two-cylinder tandem compound steam engine, 1,600 ihp (1,200 kW)
- Propulsion: Four-bladed propeller
- Sail plan: Two masts; two staysails and two Bermuda sails
- Speed: 12.5 knots (23.2 km/h; 14.4 mph) in open water
- Crew: 28
- Armament: Armed during the Second World War

Murtaja was a Finnish state-owned steam-powered icebreaker. Built in 1890 by Bergsunds Mekaniska Verkstads AB in Stockholm, Sweden, she was the first state-owned icebreaker of Finland and one of the first purpose-built icebreakers in the world. Murtaja remained in service for 68 years until she was decommissioned and broken up in 1958 after having been replaced by the diesel-electric Karhu.

== Background ==
The history of winter navigation in Finland dates back to the 17th century when mail was carried year-round between Turku, Finland and Grisslehamn, Sweden, over the Sea of Åland. During the winter season, the postmen used ice boats, strengthened sleigh-boats that were pushed over the ice until it gave in under the weight of the boat. Once in water, the men began rocking the boat back and forth until it slowly began to break the ice and proceed towards open water. The mail route was often called the most dangerous in Europe.

In the 1860s there were plans to start year-round traffic from the Hanko, the southernmost tip of the continental Finland, but even people in the Finnish Pilot and Lighthouse Authority were doubtful about the project – the director's aide was quoted saying that this close to the 60th parallel north winter traffic to Hanko would forever be a distant dream. Despite the opposition, a harbour and railway connection were built in 1872–73. Several domestic and foreign shipping companies attempted year-round traffic with varying commercial success, but the port of Hanko remained closed for several months nearly every year.

In 1889, the Finnish factory owners encouraged the Danish shipping company Det Forenede Dampskibs-Selskab to send their icebreaker, Bryderen, to the northern Baltic Sea and try to open a path to the icebound port of Hanko. Bryderen, the most powerful icebreaker in Europe at that time, had 1,000 ihp (750 kW) steam engine and could easily break ice up to 45 centimetres (18 in) thick. As word got around, people in the Senate of Finland became interested in the experiment as its result would affect the general opinions regarding icebreakers and winter navigation.

On 16 April 1889, two steamships were spotted approaching the lighthouse of Russarö from the south and news about unidentified vessels coming through the ice field began spreading immediately. The ships were the icebreaker Bryderen and a 912-ton cargo steamer Vesuv, owned by the Danish shipping company, that was following on the channel broken by the icebreaker. During the following night, the icebreaker lost all four propeller blades, but once the replacement blades had been installed, the convoy arrived at the port of Hanko on 20 April 1889 at 13:00. Large headlines in the major Finnish newspapers reported how the ice blockade had finally been broken – a foreign icebreaker had come through the ice and was now moored at a Finnish port. The successful arrival of Bryderen was seen as the definite answer to the question whether or not an icebreaker would be needed in Finland.

== Development and construction ==
Shortly after the visit of Bryderen, the Senate sent a call for bids for several Finnish and foreign shipyards for the construction of a steam-powered icebreaker capable of breaking a 32-foot (9.8 m) channel. Bids for a single-screw "European-type" icebreaker similar to the German icebreaker Eisbrecher I were received from German shipbuilder AG Vulcan Stettin, Danish Burmeister & Wain and Swedish shipyards Kockums AB and Bergsunds Mekaniska Verkstads AB. An expert committee appointed by the Senate recommended the second Swedish design, which was the second cheapest at 445,000 Swedish kronor, and the contract was signed with Bergsundet on 25 May 1889.

The construction of the icebreaker began on 18 August 1889 and she was launched on 23 December. On the same day she was given the name Murtaja after her German, Swedish and Danish counterparts – each country had named their first icebreaker simply Icebreaker in their own language.

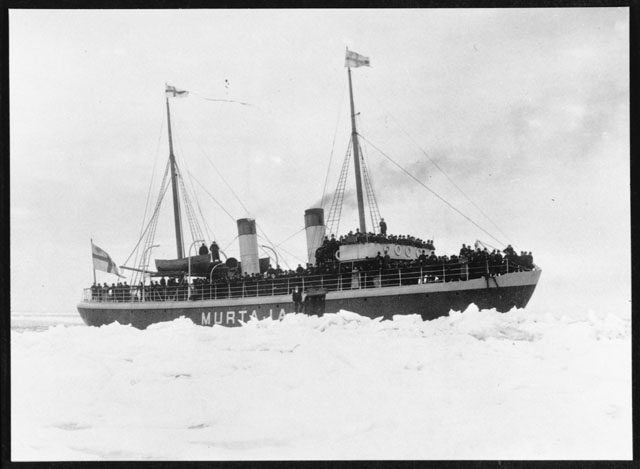
Murtaja on sea trials in late March 1890.

The sea trials on 23–26 March 1890 were witnessed by a group of experts, among them the Finnish-Swedish arctic explorer Adolf Erik Nordenskiöld, the first person to complete a voyage through the Northern Sea Route. During these trials Murtaja passed all but one of the tests for performance and general seaworthiness. Her draught at full load exceeded the contract specification by 1 foot 6 inches (0.46 m), meaning that either her specialized hull form could not be fully utilized in icebreaking or the coal capacity would have to be reduced, affecting her range and endurance. However, the shipyard promised to do everything it could to reduce the draught of the vessel to an acceptable level and Murtaja, the largest and most powerful European icebreaker at that time, was delivered to the owner on 30 March 1890. She left the shipyard on the following day and headed to Helsinki, where she was welcomed by a large cheering crowd on 2 April 1890.

== Career ==
=== Early career ===
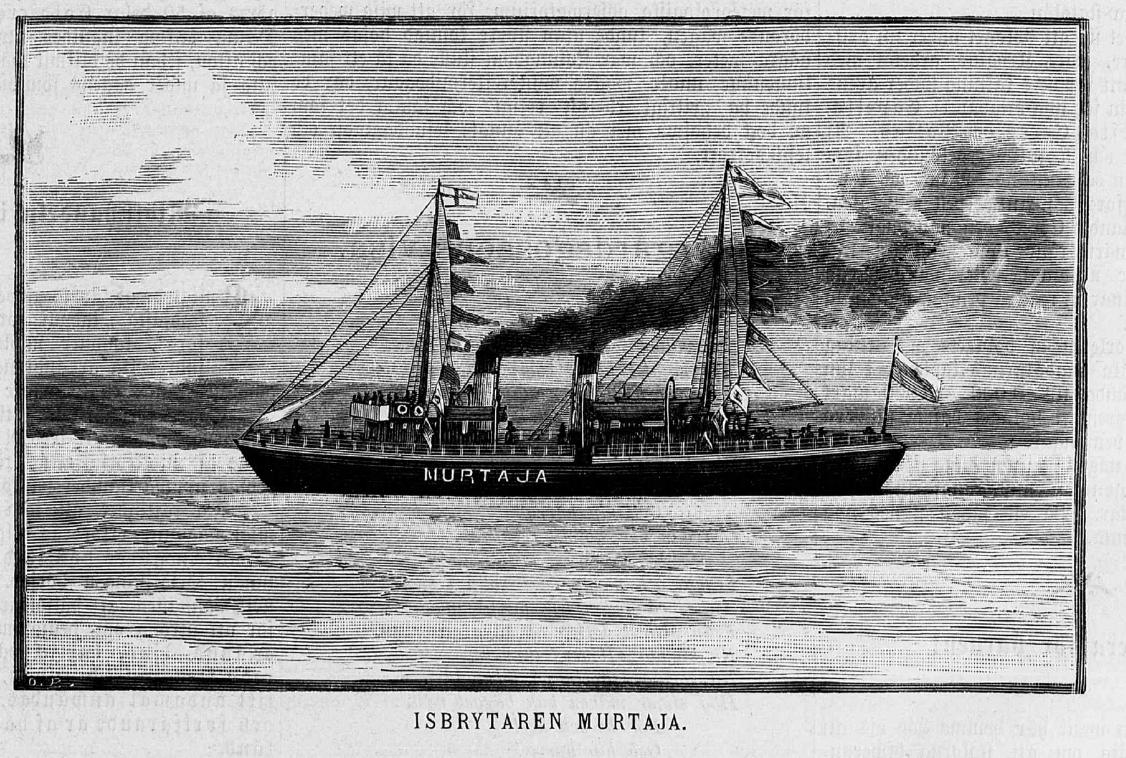
Drawing of Murtaja published in the Finnish newspaper Land och Stad on 16 April 1890, two weeks after she arrived to Finland.

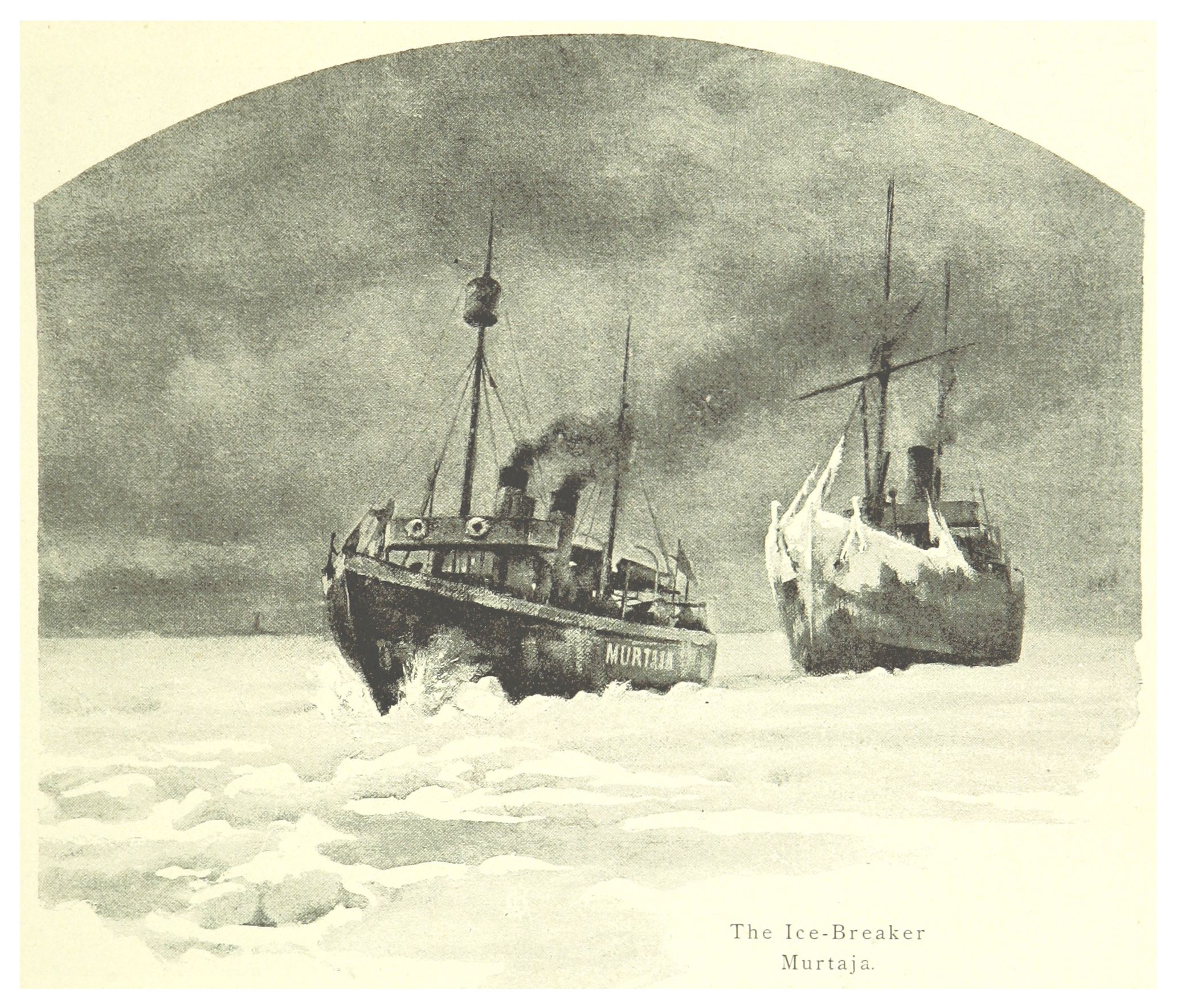
Drawing of Murtaja published in 1894.

Murtaja was given the task of assisting ships to the port of Hanko. In the temporary directive, given on 5 February 1890, she was to maintain an open channel between the harbour and open water, and assist inbound and outbound ships by towing if necessary. The directive also gave some of the first guidelines for icebreakers regarding for example the qualifications required from the crew. When Murtaja arrived in Helsinki in early April, most of the ice had already melted and the new icebreaker was not taken into service. She returned to Finnboda for repairs under warranty in May and remained in the shipyard until mid-August.

The winter of 1890–1891 was mild, so Murtaja could not demonstrate her icebreaking capabilities to their full extent. However, she lost a large number of cast iron propeller blades and while the replacement blades could be installed at sea by trimming the vessel so that the propeller shaft was near the water surface, the heavy task took several days. For this reason the Helsinki Polytechnics later developed more durable steel blades that were also used in the subsequent icebreakers.

During the first normal winters the icebreaking capability of Murtaja could be determined. She could break level ice up to 47 centimetres (19 in) thick in continuous motion as long as there was no snow, in which case even 25-centimetre (10 in) ice required backing and ramming. In this method the ship was reversed two to four ship lengths before ordering full ahead, after which the ship could break new channel up to six ship lengths, almost 150 metres (492 ft). However, in more difficult ice conditions each ramming would move the ship forwards only 10 metres (33 ft). In snow-covered ice and drift ice Murtaja could not operate efficiently due to her inefficient hull form. Sometimes the crew had to rely on hacking and sawing the ice or even explosives to release the ship from compressive ice fields.

Despite her efforts the 930-ton single-screw Murtaja was not deemed powerful enough to keep the southernmost port of Finland open every winter, and the winter navigation committee appointed by the Senate came to a conclusion that a second icebreaker would be needed. The new icebreaker, equipped with propellers in both bow and stern, was built in 1898 and given the name Sampo.

=== First World War ===
In August 1914 Russia joined the First World War and navigating in the Baltic Sea became dangerous due to naval mines and German U-boats. The Finnish icebreakers were placed under the command of the Baltic Fleet of the Imperial Russian Navy and given the task of assisting naval ships and troop transportations in the Gulf of Finland. Murtaja was stationed with Sampo in the southern parts of the Archipelago Sea and between Turku and Mariehamn. Icebreaker assistance to merchant ships was largely neglected and the icebreakers often carried supplies for the Russian troops.

On 6 December 1917 the Parliament of Finland accepted the declaration of independence given by the Senate and on 29 December the icebreakers Murtaja and Sampo raised the state flag of the independent Finland for the first time. However, already in early January 1918 the ship was seized by the Russian revolutionary fleet and ordered to assist the Russian troops stationed in Finland. From the beginning the Finnish officials attempted to negotiate the return of the icebreaker, but it wasn't until 5 April 1918 before Murtaja was handed back to Finland.

Murtaja survived the war without major damage and continued in service through the interwar period. As new icebreakers entered service in the 1920s, she was stationed in Turku, the second official winter port.

=== Second World War ===
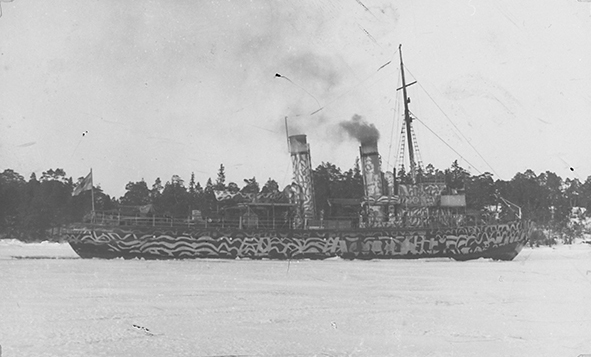
Camouflage painting of Murtaja during the Continuation War.

Due to the worsening relations with the Soviet Union, Murtaja and other state-owned icebreakers were armed and assigned to a wartime icebreaker fleet shortly before the Winter War began on 30 November 1939. The Finnish icebreakers had been equipped with gun mounts already in the 1920s and were armed with light artillery. Murtaja spent the early stages of the war in Viipuri and assisted supply ships to the port of Koivisto.

When the Continuation War began on 25 June 1941, the Finnish icebreakers were re-armed and their anti-aircraft armament was improved. On 20 July, while guarding a motti in the Hanko Front, the camouflaged Murtaja was attacked by a group of Soviet fighter-bombers. None of the planes scored a direct hit, but the nearby explosions caused severe damage to the engine and fittings. On the following day Murtaja was towed to Crichton-Vulcan shipyard in Turku for repairs. Later the front moved east and the icebreaker fleet was disbanded in December 1941, after which some of the armament was removed and the icebreakers resumed their normal peacetime duties. For the remainder of the war Murtaja assisted ships without major incidents.

=== Decommissioning ===
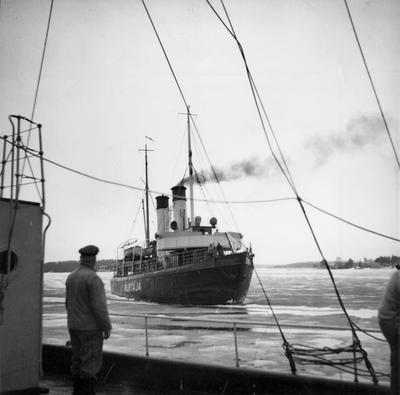
Murtaja photographed shortly before retiring in the late 1950s.

Murtaja was often criticized for her poor performance in difficult ice conditions and she was deemed old and obsolete already in 1906. Selling her was set as a prerequisite for ordering a new icebreaker, but while several foreign ports were interested in purchasing Murtaja, in September 1906 the Senate decided to order the third state-owned icebreaker, Tarmo, without selling the old one. As more modern icebreakers entered service in the 1920s, Murtaja was again deemed obsolete and worn-out, and she was criticized for her high operating costs. She was said to be in need of complete overhaul and rebuilding in 1926, but the Finnish Board of Navigation did not agree to this until almost ten years later, although it noted that decommissioning her would probably be a better solution.

Despite the criticism, Murtaja remained in service through the First and Second World Wars until the late 1950s, although during her last years in service her assistance in the Archipelago Sea was described being "more of a moral nature". The renewal of the Finnish icebreaker fleet began in 1952 after the Finnish war reparations to the Soviet Union had been paid, and the first post-war icebreaker, Voima, was commissioned in 1953. When the harsh winters of the 1950s showed that modern icebreakers were needed, a series of smaller diesel-electric icebreakers were built for operations within the archipelago. The first steam-powered icebreaker to be decommissioned was the old Murtaja, which was decommissioned on 3 May 1958 after almost 70 years of service. She was replaced by the new diesel-electric Karhu and broken up shortly afterwards. The second Karhu-class icebreaker was named Murtaja in 1959 to honor the first state-owned icebreaker of Finland.

== Technical details ==
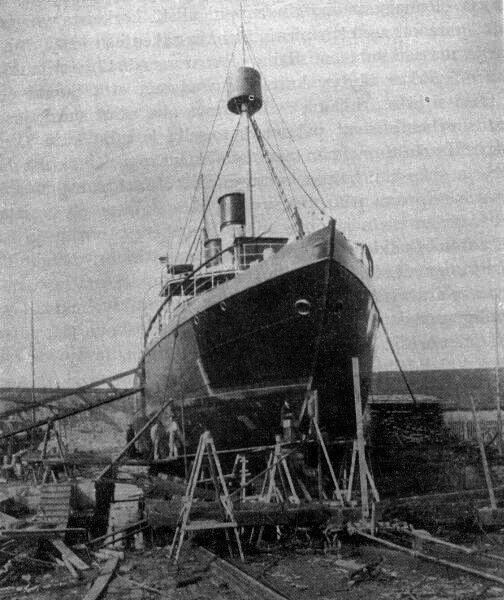
Murtaja showing her spoon-shaped bow during docking.

Murtaja was 47.55 metres (156.00 ft) long overall and 42.50 metres (139.44 ft) at the waterline. Her moulded breadth was 10.95 metres (35.93 ft) and breadth at the waterline slightly smaller, 10.80 metres (35.43 ft). The draught of the icebreaker at even keel was 5.5 metres (18 ft), but in operating condition she was trimmed by stern. The stern draught at the maximum displacement of 930 tons was defined in the contract as 20 feet (6.1 m), but when Murtaja was delivered, her maximum draught was measured as 21 feet 6 inches (6.55 m) at full load.

The round bow of Murtaja was modeled after Eisbrecher I, a German icebreaker designed by engineer Ferdinand Steinhaus from Hamburg and built in 1871, even though Robert Runeberg, an experienced Finnish naval architect and son of the national poet of Finland, had recommended a sharper ice-cutting bow instead of the spoon-shaped one. The angle of the stem, the first part of the icebreaker to encounter ice and bend it under the weight of the ship, was 33 degrees. The hull was extremely strong for its size and the shell plating thickness at the ice belt, 25 millimetres (0.98 in), was twice as thick as in the strongest winter ships at that time.

Murtaja was powered by a 1,600 ihp two-cylinder tandem compound steam engine driving a four-bladed propeller in the stern. Her four coal-powered boilers were located end-to-end as two pairs in a single boiler room in the midship. The icebreaker could achieve a speed of 12.5 knots (23.2 km/h; 14.4 mph) in open water, although her seakeeping characteristics were extremely poor due to the specialized hull form. In case of engine failure Murtaja was initially equipped with two staysails and two Bermuda sails, although they were rarely, if ever, used and disappeared from the inventory in the 1920s.

== Bibliography ==
Kaukiainen, Yrjö (1992). Navigare Necesse – Merenkulkulaitos 1917–1992. Jyväskylä: Gummerus Kirjapaino Oy. ISBN 951-47-6776-4.

Laurell, Seppo (1992). Höyrymurtajien aika. Jyväskylä: Gummerus Kirjapaino Oy. ISBN 951-47-6775-6.

Ramsay, Henrik (1949). Jääsaarron murtajat. Helsinki: Werner Söderström Osakeyhtiö (WSOY).
