= Apu (1899 icebreaker) =

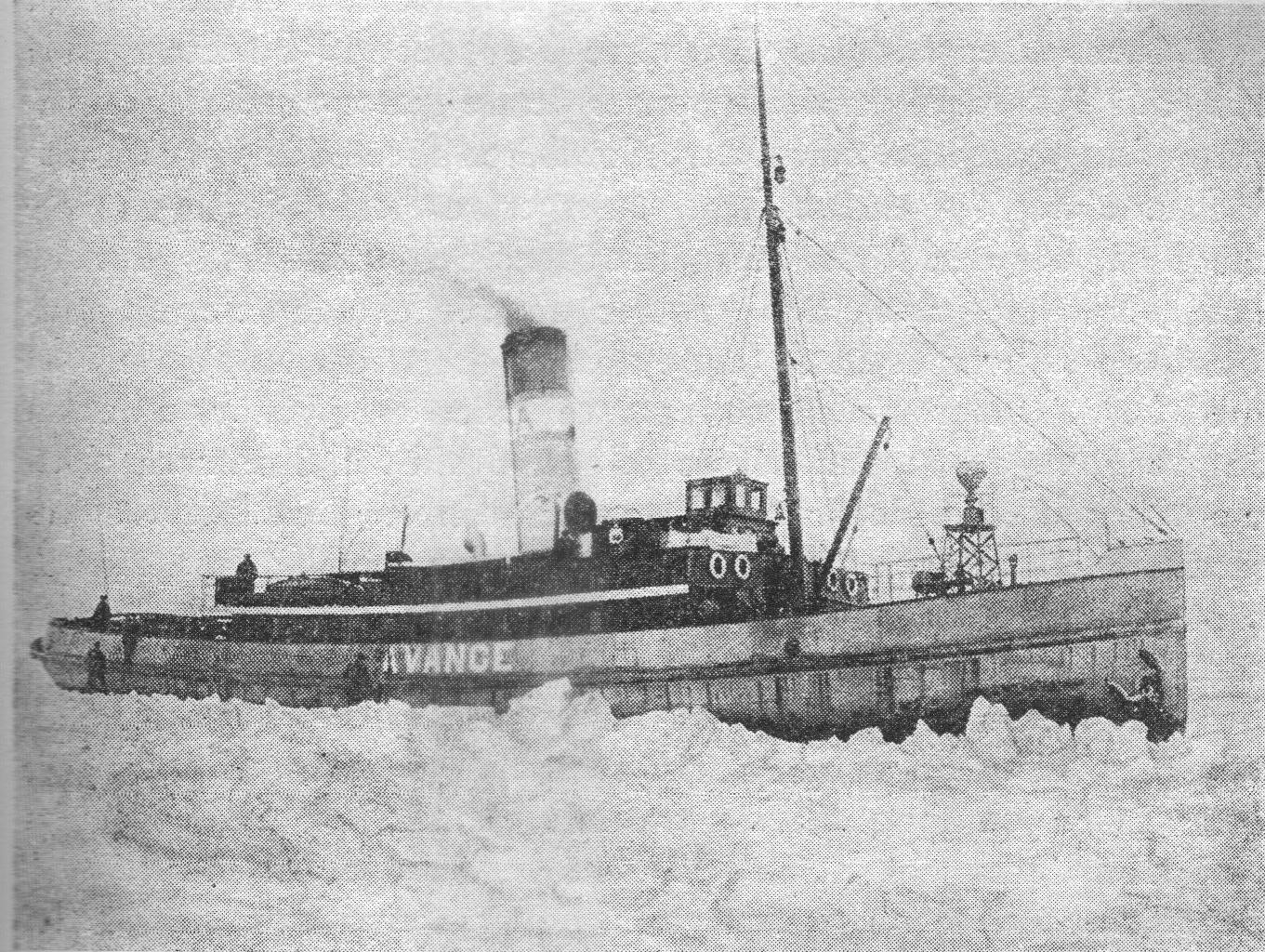
- Avance before her renaming to Apu

History

Finland
- Name: Avance (1899–1923); Apu (1923–1959)
- Namesake: Finnish for "assistance"
- Owner: Isbrytare AB Avance (1899–1922); Finnish Board of Navigation (1922–1959)
- Port of registry: Turku, Finland (1899–1922); Helsinki, Finland (1922–1959)
- Builder: Howaldtswerke, Kiel, Germany
- Cost: FIM 616,000
- Completed: February 1899
- Decommissioned: 7 April 1959
- In service: 1899–1959
- Fate: Broken up in 1959

General characteristics
- Type: Icebreaker
- Tonnage: 568 GRT; 326 NRT
- Displacement: 900 tons
- Length: 43.20 m (141.73 ft) (overall); 42.00 m (137.80 ft) (waterline)
- Beam: 10.85 m (35.60 ft) (moulded); 10.35 m (33.96 ft) (waterline)
- Draught: 5.1 m (17 ft) (even keel)
- Boilers: Two coal-fired boilers and one auxiliary boiler
- Engine: Triple-expansion steam engine, 1,500 ihp (1,100 kW)
- Sail plan: Equipped with sails
- Speed: 13.5 knots (25.0 km/h; 15.5 mph) in open water
- Crew: 23

Apu was a Finnish state-owned steam-powered icebreaker built by Howaldtswerke in Kiel, Germany, in 1899. Initially owned by a private shipping company founded by shipowners from the Finnish city of Turku and known as Avance, she was later purchased by the Finnish Board of Navigation and her name was translated into Finnish. Apu remained in service until 1959, when she was replaced by the new diesel-electric Murtaja.

== Construction ==
When the winter navigation committee appointed by the Senate of Finland in 1895 decided that the state-owned icebreakers would assist merchant ships only to the port of Hanko during the winter, the shipowners from Turku did not lose their faith in year-round traffic to their hometown. In 1898 they founded a joint shipping company, Isbrytare Aktiebolaget Avance (Icebreaker Company Avance), to order and maintain an icebreaker that would be used to maintain year-round traffic to the port of Turku. The new company was partially funded by the city and also received a long-term interest-free loan from the state. With total assets of 650,000 Finnish markkas (FIM) the company ordered a new icebreaker, designed by Swedish engineer C. Bagge, from the Howaldtswerke shipyard in Kiel, Germany. The total cost of the new vessel, christened Avance, was FIM 616,000 and in many respects she resembled the first state-owned icebreaker, Murtaja. She was completed and delivered to owners in February 1899.

== Career ==
The main task of Avance was to assist ships between Turku and Stockholm although scheduled year-round shipping service to the German city of Lübeck was launched during her first year in operation and she was often needed also in the southern shipping lane passing the island of Utö. She was found out to be suitable for icebreaking in the sheltered waters within the archipelago, but her wheelhouse had to be made higher shortly after entering service to improve visibility astern.

Avance was offered to the city of Stockholm in 1907, but the Swedish buyers decided that she was too expensive and broke off the deal. Maintaining the icebreaker turned out to be more expensive than what was anticipated, and in 1909 the city of Turku purchased the majority of the shipping company's shares.

In August 1914 Russia joined the First World War and the Finnish icebreakers were placed under the command of the Baltic Fleet of the Imperial Russian Navy. Avance was confiscated and used to transport troops and supplies to coastal forts at the Gulf of Finland. Her name was written on the side in Cyrillic as Авансь.

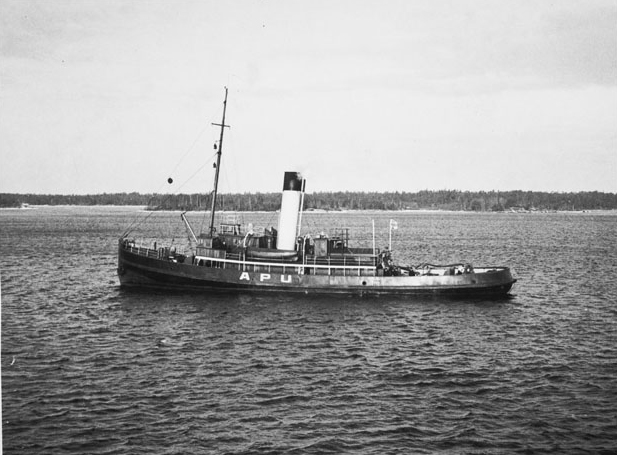
Apu after refit.

When Finland declared independence on 6 December 1917, Avance was still under Russian control. After a failed attempt to recapture her in early 1918 she was taken to St. Petersburg by the retreating Russian revolutionaries. The Russians returned her in poor condition in 1922 after Wäinämöinen and Ilmarinen, two former Russian icebreakers captured by the White Guard during the civil war in 1918, had been returned to their previous owners. Unable to pay for the extensive repairs, the shipping company sold Avance to the Board of Navigation for FIM 1.58 million. She was repaired at the Ab Crichton shipyard, who was paid FIM 1.25 million for the work, and on 15 December 1923 her name was translated to Apu, meaning "assistance" in Finnish.

After refit Apu resumed her duties on the Archipelago Sea as a state-owned icebreaker and remained in service through the Second World War until 1959 even though during her last years in service her assistance in the Archipelago Sea was described being "more of a moral nature". The 60-year-old icebreaker was decommissioned on 7 April 1959 and broken up shortly afterwards. She was replaced by the second Karhu class icebreaker, Murtaja.

In 1969 a new diesel-electric icebreaker was named Apu after the smallest state-owned icebreaker of Finland. The new icebreaker was more than five times as big as the old one by displacement and had almost eight times as much power in her four propellers.

== Technical details ==
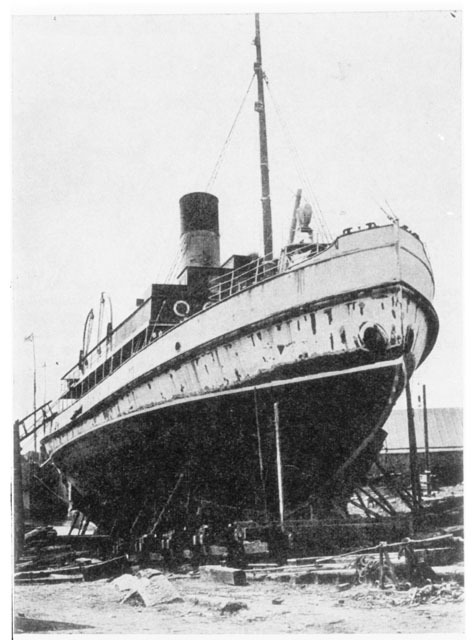
Avance docked, showing her icebreaker bow.

Avance was 43.20 metres (141.73 ft) long overall and 42.00 metres (137.80 ft) at the waterline. Her moulded breadth was 10.85 metres (35.60 ft) and breadth at the waterline slightly smaller, 10.35 metres (33.96 ft). The draught of the icebreaker at maximum displacement, 900 tons, was 5.1 metres (16.73 ft) on even keel.

The ship was powered by a 1,500 ihp triple-expansion steam engine driving a single propeller in the stern and giving Avance a maximum speed of 13.5 knots (25.0 km/h; 15.5 mph) in open water. She had two coal-fired boilers and a smaller auxiliary boiler, all in a single engine room amidships. Her stores could hold 100 tons of coal, which was fed to the boilers at a rate of 1.3 to 1.8 tons per hour when the ship was breaking ice. Like other icebreakers of her time, she was also equipped with sails which, while rarely used, remained in the inventory until the 1920s.

In many ways Avance resembled the first state-owned icebreaker of Finland, Murtaja, although her bow was of improved Swedish design which increased her icebreaking capability. The angle of the stem, the first part of the ship to encounter and break the ice, was 22 degrees. Still, she was of the same outdated European design as Murtaja and thus had similar problems in difficult ice conditions. Her coal stores were also located too far in the front, resulting in an unfavourable trim at full load. Despite her shortcomings Avance was found out to be suitable for service within the archipelago.

== Bibliography ==
Laurell, Seppo (1992). Höyrymurtajien aika. Jyväskylä: Gummerus Kirjapaino Oy. ISBN 951-47-6775-6.
