= Sisu (1938 icebreaker) =

Finnish icebreaker built in 1939

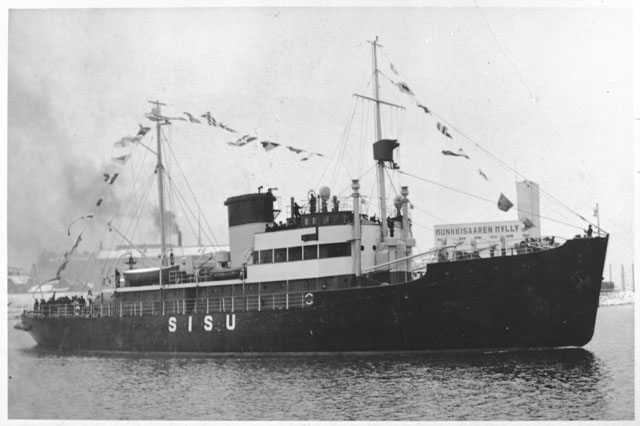

History

Finland
- Name: Sisu
- Namesake: Sisu
- Owner: Finnish Board of Navigation
- Port of registry: Helsinki, Finland
- Builder: Wärtsilä Hietalahti Shipyard (Helsinki, Finland)
- Cost: FIM 39 million
- Yard number: 272
- Laid down: March 1937
- Launched: 24 September 1938
- Sponsored by: Walborg Jokinen
- Christened: 24 August 1938
- Completed: 12 March 1939
- In service: 1939–1974
- Identification: IMO number: 5330371; Call sign: OHLL
- Fate: Handed over to the Finnish Navy in 1975

Finland
- Name: Louhi
- Namesake: Louhi
- Owner: Finnish Navy
- In service: 1975–1986
- Identification: Hull number: 90
- Fate: Broken up

General characteristics
- Type: Icebreaker
- Displacement: 2,075 tonnes
- Length: 65.3 m (214 ft)
- Beam: 14.4 m (47 ft)
- Draught: 5.1 m (17 ft)
- Installed power: Three Atlas Polar diesel engines
- Propulsion: Diesel-electric (DC/DC); Three shafts (3 × 1,335 hp)
- Speed: 15 knots (28 km/h; 17 mph)
- Crew: 51 (as icebreaker); Accommodation for 100
- Armament: Armed during the war

Sisu was a Finnish state-owned icebreaker. Built in 1939 at Wärtsilä Hietalahti Shipyard in Helsinki, she was one of the world's first diesel-electric icebreakers. In addition to icebreaking duties, she served as a submarine tender for the Finnish Navy during the summer months until the end of the Continuation War.

In 1975, Sisu was handed over to the Finnish Navy and renamed Louhi. She was decommissioned in 1986 and sold for scrap.

== Development and construction ==
While the economic growth stagnated in Finland in the early 1930s following the Great Depression, international trade began to recover relatively soon and in particular the export of forest products from the ports in the Bothnian Bay was growing. Already in 1932, a delegation from Northern Ostrobothnia submitted a proposal for the construction of a new state-owned icebreaker. In 1935, another large delegation of politicians and representatives from coastal cities proposed expanding the state-owned icebreaker fleet. They were also strongly supported by the growing Finnish forest industry.

At the time, Finland had a fleet of six steam-powered icebreakers to keep trade routes open through the winter months. Following the commissioning of Jääkarhu in 1926, the Finnish Board of Navigation had planned to replace the smallest vessels of the state-owned fleet, the 1890-built Murtaja and the 1899-built Apu, with a new medium-sized icebreaker. These icebreakers represented the first generation of icebreaker design in the Baltic Sea and were considered obsolete because they had no bow propeller. However, the plans were shelved due to the recession.

In June 1935, a small expert committee led by Captain Ilmari Jokinen, the director of the Finnish Board of Navigation, began investigating the feasibility of a dual-use vessel that could be used as an icebreaker during the winter and as a submarine tender for the Finnish Navy during the summer months. The committee found the idea feasible and, in addition, recommended replacing traditional reciprocating steam engines with a diesel-electric power plant pioneered by the Swedish icebreaker Ymer in 1933. While a second expert committee, formed from experienced Finnish naval architects and icebreaker captains in March 1936, proposed purchasing two new icebreakers, the Parliament of Finland allocated FIM 36 million for ordering one medium-sized icebreaker.

The construction of the new icebreaker was awarded to Sandvikens Skeppsdocka och Mekaniska Verkstads Ab and the work began in March 1937. Previously, the Helsinki-based shipyard had completed the unfinished Voima in 1924 and built a port icebreaker for the city of Helsinki in 1936. On 24 September 1938, the vessel was given the name Sisu, a Finnish word describing will, determination and perseverance, that had been chosen by the Finnish schoolchildren. The sponsor of the vessel was Walborg Jokinen, the wife of the late Captain Ilmari Jokinen. While Sisu was delivered behind the original 20-month schedule and the vessel turned out to be more expensive as predicted, she was generally considered to be a successful design. She was handed over to the Finnish Board of Navigation in March 1939.

== Career ==
=== Second World War (1939–1944) ===
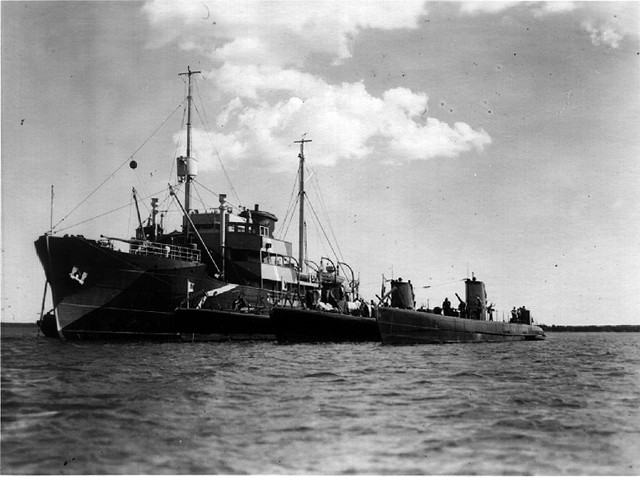
Sisu together with two Finnish submarines

In late 1939, the Finnish state-owned icebreakers were armed and assigned to a wartime icebreaker flotilla due to deteriorating foreign relations with the Soviet Union. When the Winter War began on 30 November 1939, Sisu was still in Helsinki where she was being outfitted for her secondary role as a submarine tender. In the beginning of the war she operated with the Finnish submarines Vesihiisi, Vesikko and Saukko in the Gulf of Finland, but later moved to the Archipelago Sea to support Vetehinen and Iku-Turso. In January 1940, the icebreaker was sent to the Gulf of Bothnia to escort merchant ships after the ice conditions in the Baltic Sea had become too difficult for the submarines.

When the Continuation War started in June 1941 after a short period known as the Interim Peace, the state-owned icebreakers resumed their wartime duties. when the whole Baltic Sea froze during the extremely difficult winter of 1942, Sisu had to escort ships all the way to Pillau (today Baltiysk in Kaliningrad) and Swinemünde (today Świnoujście in Poland). When Finland began suffering from food shortages, Sisu was paired up with Jääkarhu, and together the two most powerful Finnish icebreakers helped to bring in Finnish and German merchant ships carrying much-needed supplies.

On 19 September 1943, Sisu struck a Soviet mine that had been dropped on the shipping lane west of the island fort of Rysäkari off Helsinki. While no-one was injured, the explosion damaged the propeller shafts and the icebreaker had to be towed to Hietalahti Shipyard for extensive repairs. While the vessel returned to service three months later, these damages were never fully repaired and followed Sisu until her final decommissioning in the 1980s.

Unlike the other state-owned icebreakers, Sisu was manned through the Second World War due to her role as a depot ship. During the Winter War, Sisu was armed with two Obukhov 102 mm naval guns and two Vickers 40 mm anti-aircraft guns. The latter were replaced with two Madsen 20 mm cannons and two machine guns in the Continuation War. In 1944, the main battery was replaced with two 105 mm Rheinmetall-Borsig naval guns and one more Madsen 20 mm cannon was added to the anti-aircraft battery. During the war, Sisu was painted with camouflage colors.

=== Post-war career (1944–1975) ===
When the Continuation War ended with the Moscow Armistice on 19 September 1944, Finland had to hand over its best ice-strengthened tonnage to the Soviet Union as war reparations. While this included Jääkarhu and Voima, Finland's newest and most powerful steam-powered icebreakers, the Soviets were not interested in the diesel-electric Sisu. The power plant and propulsion system represented unfamiliar technology at the time when all Soviet icebreakers were still powered by reciprocating steam engines. In addition, the damages Sisu had sustained in the mine explosion in 1943 had not been fully repaired. While minor repairs were carried out during the post-war summer layups, no major repairs were not done until 1954 when additional funding was granted for this purpose and the icebreaker was drydocked at Hietalahti shipyard.

Since Finland was no longer allowed to have submarines according to the Paris Peace Treaty of 1947, Sisu lost her secondary role as a submarine tender. While she was briefly used as a training ship for the Finnish Naval Academy in 1949, the icebreaker was not suited to gunnery training and the civilian crew was against co-operation with the Navy.

On 27 January 1959, Sisu arrived in Rauma to have one of her generators repaired. Late in the evening, a faulty radiator in one of the cabins started a fire that quickly spread in the aft part of the vessel. While it was brought under control within three hours through the co-operative effort of the city fire department, a local volunteer fire department and three industrial fire brigades from nearby factories, the fire and water destroyed six cabins and damaged the vessel's electric system, turning gear and aft propulsion motors. However, the main engine room was protected by a carbon dioxide fire suppression system and the excessive use of water prevented the fuel oil tanks below the main deck from exploding. Although the vessel was fully crewed and part of the crew was sleeping, no-one was injured in the fire. Sisu returned to service after extensive repairs on 26 April 1959.

The Finnish Board of Navigation decommissioned Sisu, now the oldest and smallest icebreaker in the state-owned fleet, in 1974. At the time, Finland had a fleet of nine diesel-electric icebreakers in service and two more under construction. The new icebreakers, which had nearly five times the displacement and more than five times the power of the old Sisu, were designed to guarantee year-round traffic to all Finnish ports in the Bothnian Bay. The second of these icebreakers was named Sisu in 1975.

=== As Louhi (1975–1986) ===
The old Sisu was handed to the Finnish Navy in 1975 and given the name Louhi. The name, which has its origins in the Finnish mythology, had previously been used for the 1917-built minelayer that sank in 1945 with a loss of 11 lives after striking a mine or having been hit by a torpedo from a German U-boat.

Louhi operated primarily as a depot ship for Tuima-class missile boats and Nuoli-class fast gunboats. She also towed the missile boats between operations because the Tuima class was powered by three 56-cylinder radial engines of Soviet origin that had poor fuel economy. During the hardest winters, she sometimes resumed her duties as an icebreaker.

Louhi was decommissioned in 1986. While the hull of the vessel was still in acceptable condition, the main engines were worn-out and it was becoming increasingly difficult to find spare parts for the original diesel-electric power plant dating back to the late 1930s. The Finnish Navy tried to sell the vessel with public newspaper announcement, but after it was determined that most onboard systems had deteriorated beyond repair, it was decided to sell the old icebreaker for scrap. The 1939-built vessel was broken up in Naantali shortly before the 1959-built Murtaja arrived at the same shipbreaker. The name Louhi was later given to a 2011-built multipurpose vessel operated by the Finnish Navy.

== Technical details ==
=== General characteristics ===
In terms of size and hull form, Sisu was comparable to the 1924-built Voima, but had a more rounded midship and a smaller stem angle of 23 degrees from horizontal. She was 65.3 metres (214 ft) long and had a beam of 14.4 metres (47 ft). When loaded to a normal operating draught of 5.1 metres (17 ft), her displacement was 2,075 tonnes. The only icebreakers in the state-owned fleet with greater displacement were the 2,400-ton Tarmo and the 4,800-ton Jääkarhu.

Inside, the hull was divided into eight watertight compartments protected by a continuous double bottom. The ice belt consisted of 1 inch (25 mm) thick shell plating and transverse frames every 400 to 450 millimetres (16 to 18 in). The main and auxiliary engine rooms were located amidships below the main deck with the propulsion motors in their own watertight compartments. The remaining space was taken up by tanks for fuel and lubricating oil, fresh water and ballast. While Sisu was designed to operate with a crew of 51 during the winter season, she could accommodate more than 100 persons during the summer season when the vessel operated as a submarine tender. Like the other Finnish icebreakers, Sisu was fitted with a towing winch and a notch where the bow of the escorted ship could be pulled.

=== Power and propulsion ===
Sisu was a diesel-electric icebreaker with a power plant consisting of three eight-cylinder Atlas Polar single-acting two-stroke diesel engines, each rated at 1,600 hp in continuous operation, directly coupled to 1,070 kVA Strömberg generators. The diesel-driven direct current (DC) double-armature generators supplied electricity to three 1,335 hp Strömberg DC motors, two driving fixed-pitch propellers in the stern and the third coupled to a single forward-facing propeller in the bow, through a Ward Leonard drive system. In addition, Sisu had three 200 hp auxiliary diesel generators which provided electricity for other onboard consumers as well as excitation current for the main generators.

While during normal icebreaking operations each main generator fed its dedicated double-armature electric motor, the diesel generator supplying the forward propulsion motor could also be switched to supply electricity to either of the stern motors. In addition, the current from any of the main generators could be split between the port and starboard propulsion motors with the control of both motors remaining independent from each other. While the stern propulsion motors were built for double torque to overcome the additional loads from propeller-ice interaction, the electric motor driving the forward-facing propeller was dimensioned for a three-fold torque to keep the propeller turning in difficult ice conditions. The nominal speeds of the propulsion motors were 140 rpm in the stern and 160 rpm in the bow.

Although comparable to Voima in terms of main dimensions and displacement, Sisu had significantly more propulsion power: she was second only to the 7,500 shp Jääkarhu. In addition, her diesel-electric machinery had a number of advantages over steam engines and boilers, such as lower fuel consumption, longer autonomy time, and better dynamic response during icebreaking operations. The advantages of the modern propulsion system somewhat balanced the disadvantages caused by the secondary use as a submarine tender during the summer months as well as limited draft required for escorting ships to the port of Toppila in Oulu.

== Bibliography ==
- Kaukiainen, Yrjö (1992). Navigare Necesse – Merenkulkulaitos 1917–1992. Jyväskylä: Gummerus Kirjapaino Oy. ISBN 951-47-6776-4.
- Laurell, Seppo (1992). Höyrymurtajien aika. Jyväskylä: Gummerus Kirjapaino Oy. ISBN 951-47-6775-6.
- Ramsay, Henrik (1949). Jääsaarron murtajat. Helsinki: Werner Söderström Osakeyhtiö (WSOY).
