= Helsinki shipyard =

Helsinki shipyard may refer to the following shipyards, which have operated in Helsinki.

- Hietalahti shipyard, a 1865 founded shipyard in Hietalahti; operated by:
  - Helsingfors Skeppsdocka (1865–1894)
  - Sandvikens Skeppsdocka och Mekaniska Verkstad (1895–1938)
  - Wärtsilä Hietalahti Shipyard (1938–1965)
  - Wärtsilä Helsinki Shipyard (1966–1986)
  - Wärtsilä Marine Helsinki Shipyard (1987–1989)
  - Masa-Yards Helsinki New Shipyard
  - Kværner Masa-Yards Helsinki New Shipyard
  - Aker Finnyards Helsinki Shipyard (2005–2006)
  - Aker Yards Helsinki Shipyard (2006–2008)
  - STX Finland Helsinki Shipyard (2008–2011)
  - Arctech Helsinki Shipyard (2010–2019)
  - Helsinki Shipyard (2019→)
- Suomenlinna shipyard, a dockyard in Suomenlinna, built in the 18th century
- Katajanokka shipyard, the old Valmet yard in Katajanokka from 1951 to the 1970s
- Vuosaari shipyard, the new Valmet yard in Vuosaari from 1974 to 1987
- Kone- ja Siltarakennus shipyard in Sörnäinen from 1891 to the 1920s
