= Malygin (icebreaker) =

Malygin (Малыгин) may refer to one of the following icebreakers:

- Malygin (1912 icebreaker), built in 1912 as the British merchant ship Bruce, and later a Russian, then Soviet, icebreaker; lost in 1940.
- Malygin (1945 icebreaker), formerly the Finnish icebreaker Voima, built 1924, that was handed over to the Soviet Union as war reparations in 1945 and broken up in 1971.
