= 120 mm 50 caliber Pattern 1905 =

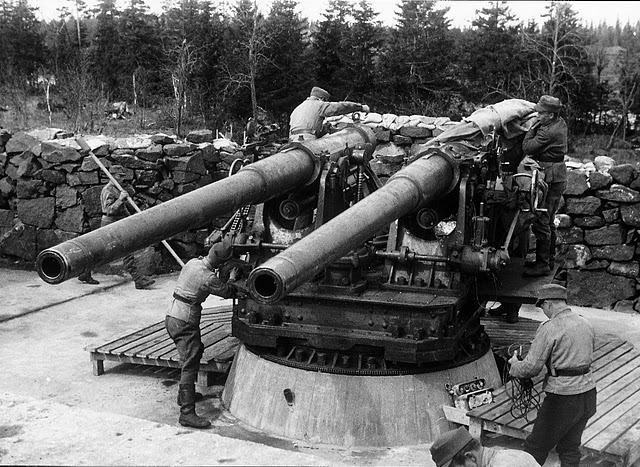
- An open twin-mount Pattern 1905 in Finnish service.
- Type: Naval gun Coastal artillery Railway artillery
- Place of origin: Great Britain

Service history
- In service: 1905–1950s
- Used by: Russian Empire; Soviet Union; Finland
- Wars: World War I Russian Civil War; Winter War; World War II

Production history
- Designer: Vickers
- Designed: 1905
- Manufacturer: Vickers; Obukhov State Plant
- Produced: 1905
- No. built: 210

Specifications
- Mass: 3.1 t (3.4 short tons)
- Length: 6 m (19 ft 8 in) 50 caliber
- Barrel length: 5.8 m (19 ft 0 in)
- Shell: Fixed QF ammunition
- Shell weight: 20.4–29 kg (45–64 lb)
- Calibre: 120 mm (4.7 in)
- Elevation: Single mount: -10° to +20° Twin mount: -3° to +27°
- Traverse: 360°
- Rate of fire: 6-7 rpm
- Muzzle velocity: 792 m/s (2,600 ft/s)
- Maximum firing range: 13.7 km (8.5 mi) at +20°

The 120 mm 50 caliber Pattern 1905 was a Russian naval gun developed by Vickers for export in the years before World War I that armed a variety of warships of the Imperial Russian Navy. Guns salvaged from scrapped ships found a second life as coastal artillery, railway artillery and aboard river monitors during the Russian Civil War. It was estimated that there were 110 guns in the Soviet Navy's inventory in 1941. Of these, 39 were in the Baltic Fleet, 20 in the Black sea Fleet, 24 in the Amur Flotilla, 11 in the Pacific Fleet and 6 in the Pinsk flotilla in World War II.

== History ==
The Pattern 1905 began life as a Vickers design produced in Great Britain for export customers. The Pattern 1905 was also produced under license at the Obukhov State Plant in St. Petersburg, Russia.

== Construction ==
The Pattern 1905 was a built-up gun which consisted of an A tube, three layers of reinforcing tubes, a jacket and a breech piece which screwed onto the jacket. Once Obhukov started production the Vickers guns were referred to as model 1 guns, while those manufactured by Obukhov were referred to as model 2 guns. By 1918 it was estimated that 180 guns had been completed with another 20 partially complete. A few more were finished between 1921 and 1924 from existing stocks.

== Naval use ==
The Pattern 1905 guns armed armored cruisers, dreadnought battleships, gunboats, icebreakers and river monitors of the Imperial Russian Navy and Soviet Navy built or refit between 1905 and 1924.

=== Armored cruisers ===
- Russian cruiser Rurik - The anti-torpedo boat armament of this ship consisted of twenty Pattern 1905 guns in casemates amidships.

=== Dreadnought battleships ===
- Gangut-class battleships - The four ships of this class had an anti-torpedo boat armament of sixteen Pattern 1905 guns in casemates amidships.

=== Gunboats ===
- Kars-class gunboats - The two ships of this class were built with a primary armament of two Pattern 1905 guns on open mounts.
- Gilyak-class gunboats - The four ships of this class were built with a primary armament of two Pattern 1905 guns on open mounts.

=== Icebreakers ===
- Three Finnish Icebreakers the Sampo, Tarmo and Voima were briefly armed with Pattern 1905 guns in open twin-mounts. The guns were found to be too heavy and their recoil forces were too strong for the ships and were removed.

=== River monitors ===
- Tayfun-class river monitors - The eight ships of this class were built with a secondary armament of four Pattern 1905 guns in two twin-turrets amidships.

== Ammunition ==
Ammunition was of Fixed QF type and weighed between 20.4–29 kg (45–64 lb).

The gun was able to fire:

- Common
- High Explosive
- Illumination
- Incendiary
- SAP
- Shrapnel

== Photo Gallery ==
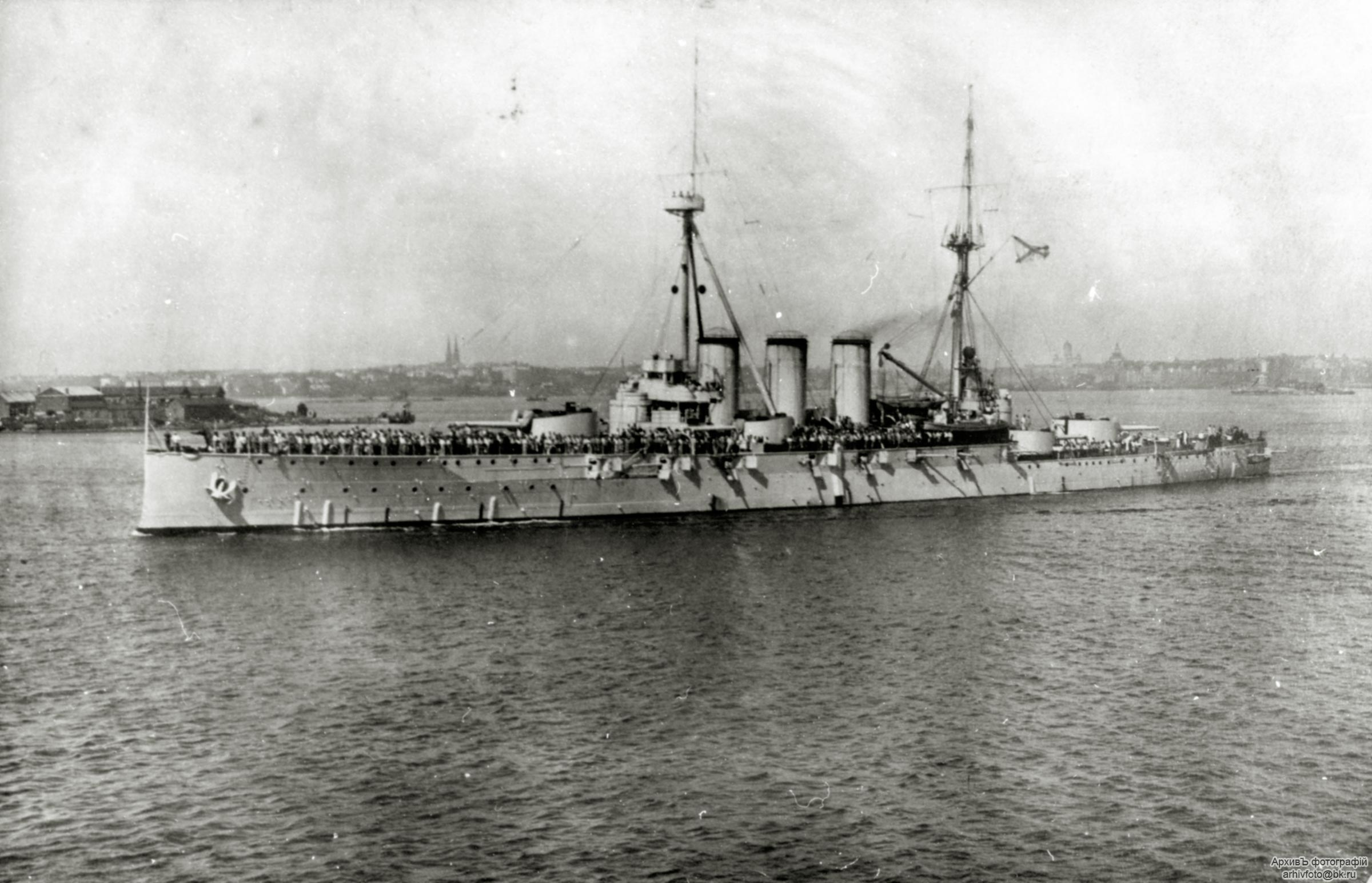
The Armored Cruiser Rurik in 1917.

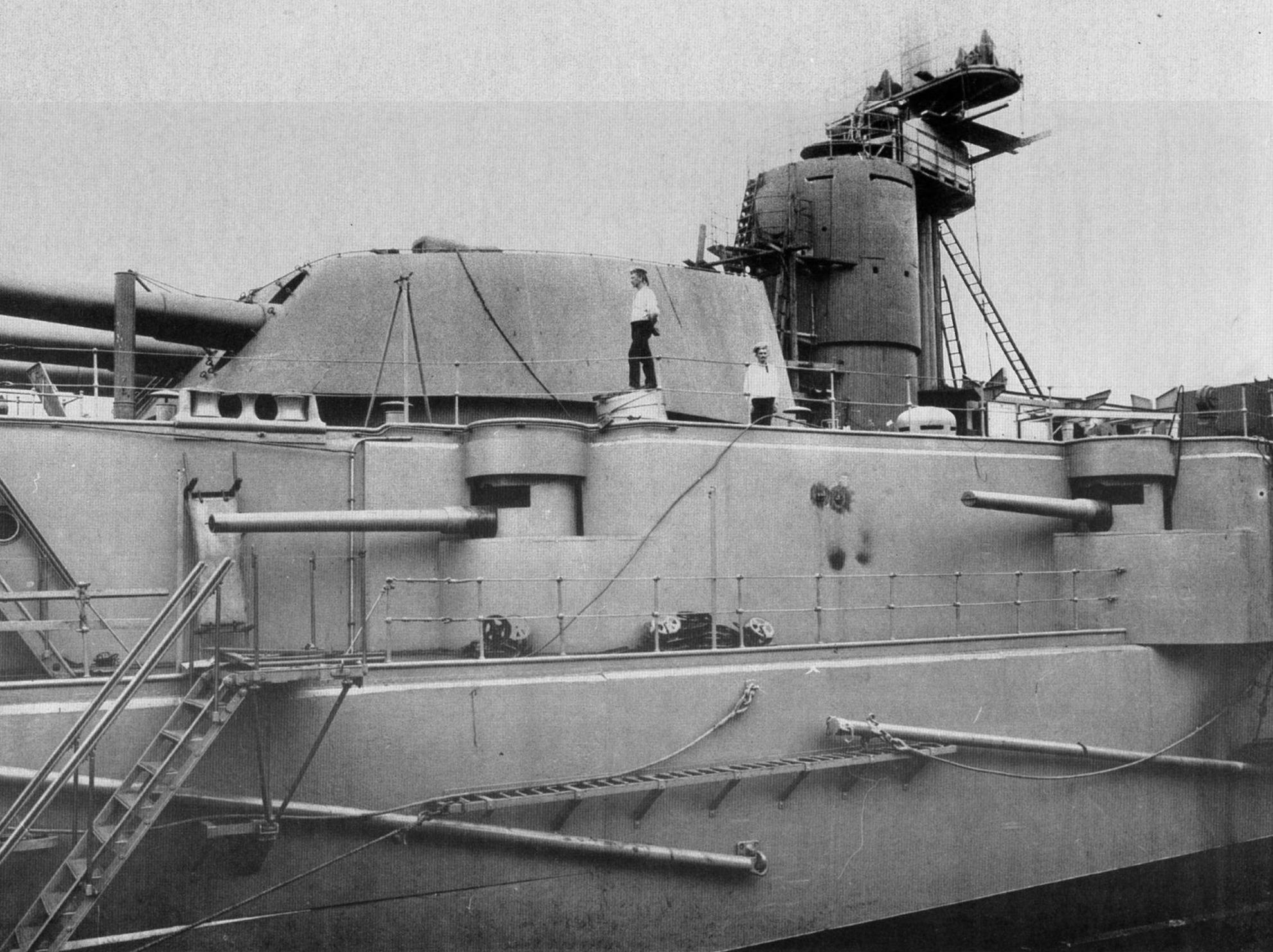
A view of the casemated Pattern 1905 guns amidships aboard the battleship Gangut.

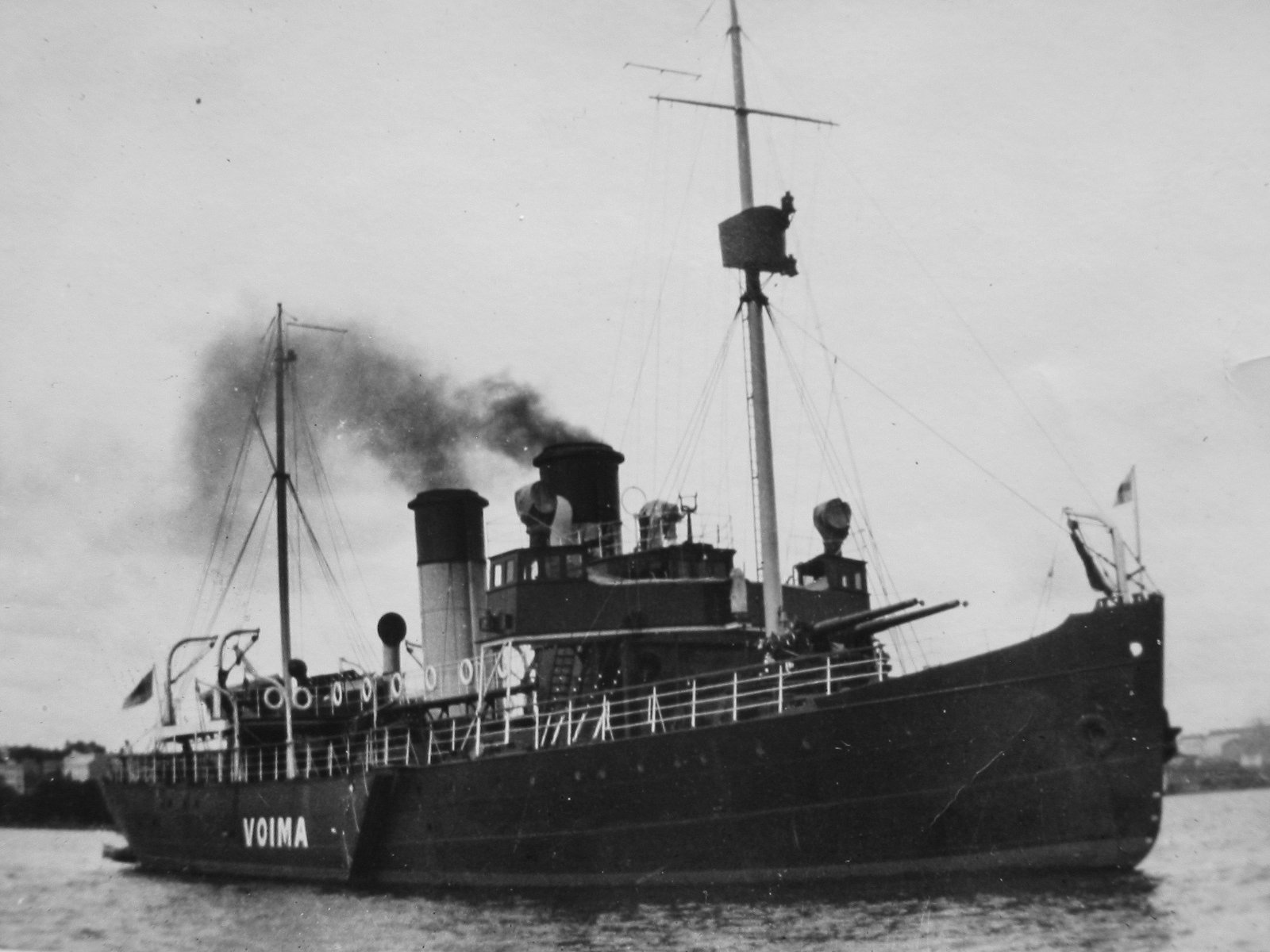
A view of the open twin-mount Pattern 1905 guns aboard the Finnish icebreaker Voima.

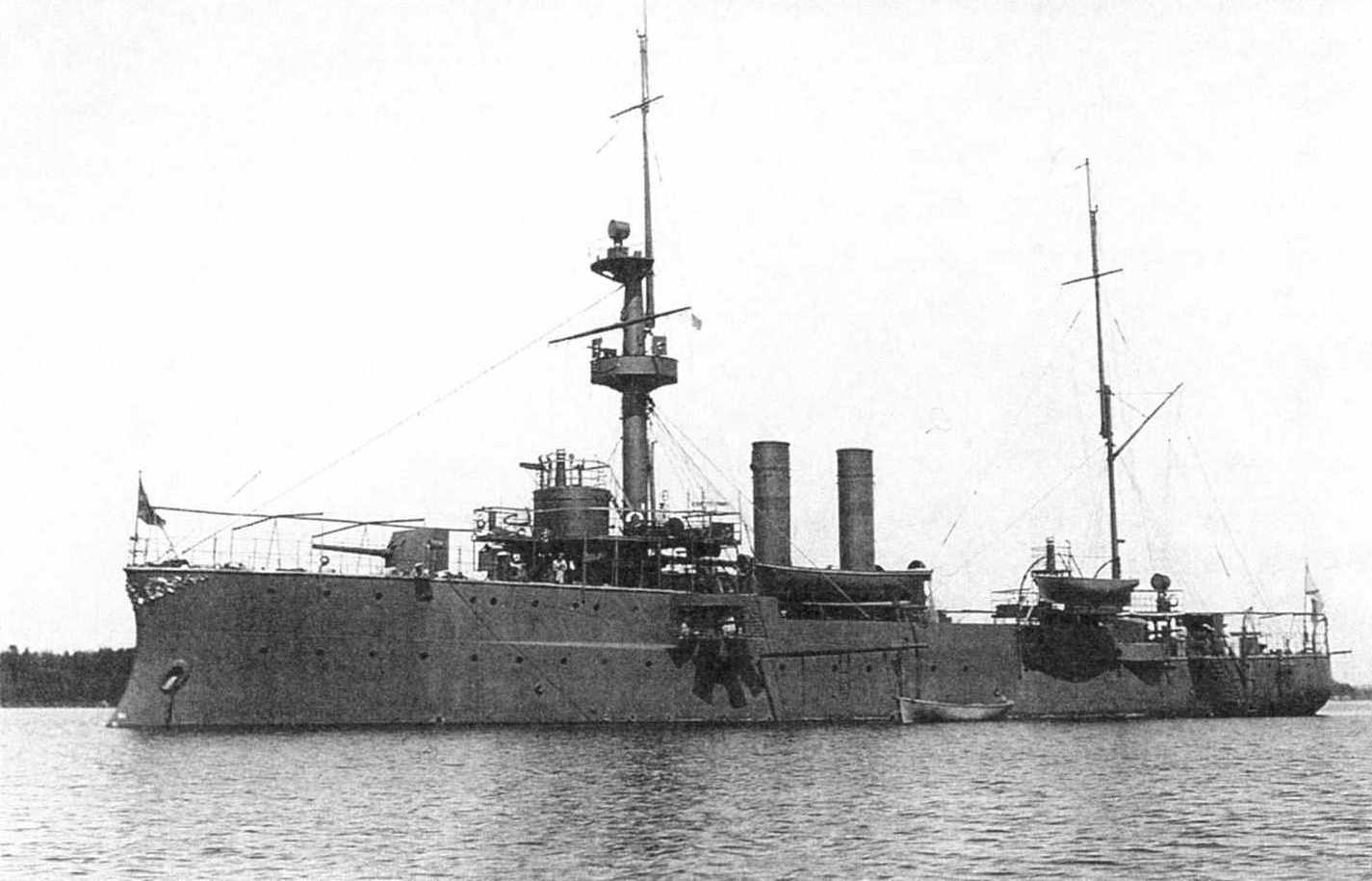
The gunboat Gilyak.

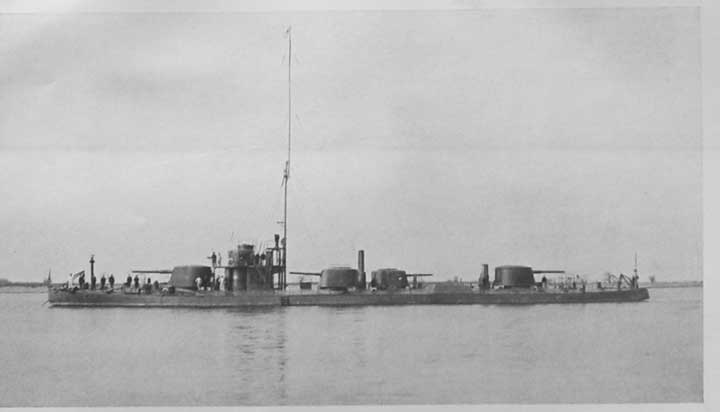
The gunboat Shkval of the Amur Flotilla.

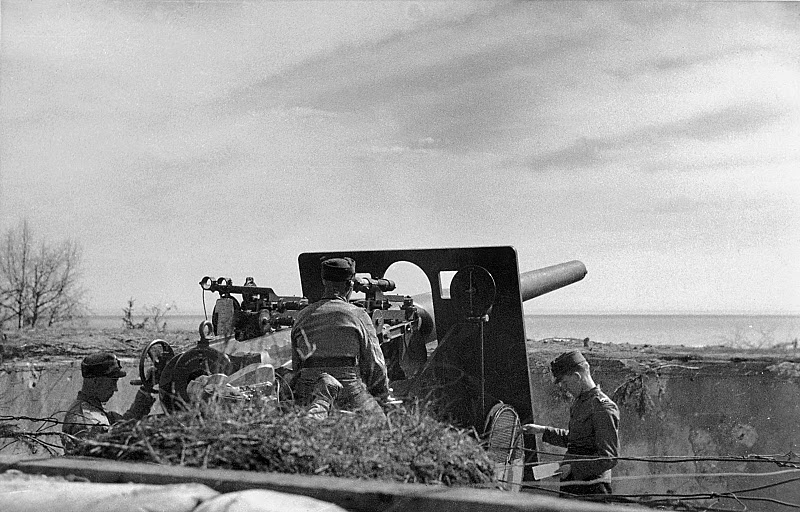
A single shielded Pattern 1905 gun in Finnish service.
