= Jääkarhu =

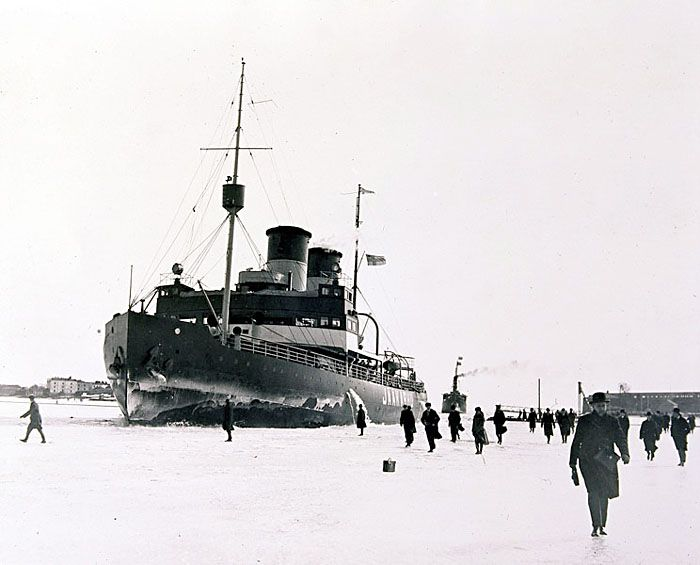
- Jääkarhu arriving in Helsinki in April 1926.

History

Finland
- Name: Jääkarhu
- Namesake: Finnish for "polar bear"
- Owner: Finnish Board of Navigation
- Port of registry: Helsinki, Finland
- Ordered: 17 April 1924
- Builder: P. Smit Jr. Shipbuilding and Machine Factory, Rotterdam, Netherlands
- Cost: ƒ1,563,000; (FIM 26,000,000)
- Yard number: 350
- Launched: 26 August 1925
- Commissioned: 2 March 1926
- Decommissioned: 24 February 1945
- In service: 1926–1945
- Fate: Handed over to the Soviet Union

Soviet Union
- Name: Sibiryakov (Сибиряков)
- Namesake: Alexander Mikhaylovich Sibiryakov
- In service: 1945–1972
- Fate: Broken up in 1972

General characteristics
- Type: Icebreaker
- Tonnage: 2,622 GRT
- Displacement: 4,836 tons
- Length: 78.45 m (257.4 ft) (overall); 75.00 m (246.06 ft) (waterline)
- Beam: 19.28 m (63.3 ft) (moulded); 18.50 m (60.7 ft) (waterline)
- Draught: 6.5 m (21 ft)
- Boilers: Eight oil-fired boilers
- Engines: Three triple-expansion steam engines 2 × 2,500 ihp (stern); 2,600 ihp (bow)
- Propulsion: Three propellers; two in stern and one in bow
- Speed: 13.5 knots (25.0 km/h; 15.5 mph) in open water
- Crew: 47
- Armament: Armed during the war

Jääkarhu was a Finnish and later Soviet steam-powered icebreaker. Built in 1926 by P. Smit Jr. Shipbuilding and Machine Factory in Rotterdam, Netherlands, she was the last and largest steam-powered state-owned icebreaker of Finland. After two decades of successful service, Jääkarhu was handed over to the Soviet Union as war reparation in 1945 and renamed Sibiryakov. She remained in service until the 1970s and was broken up in 1972.

== Background and construction ==
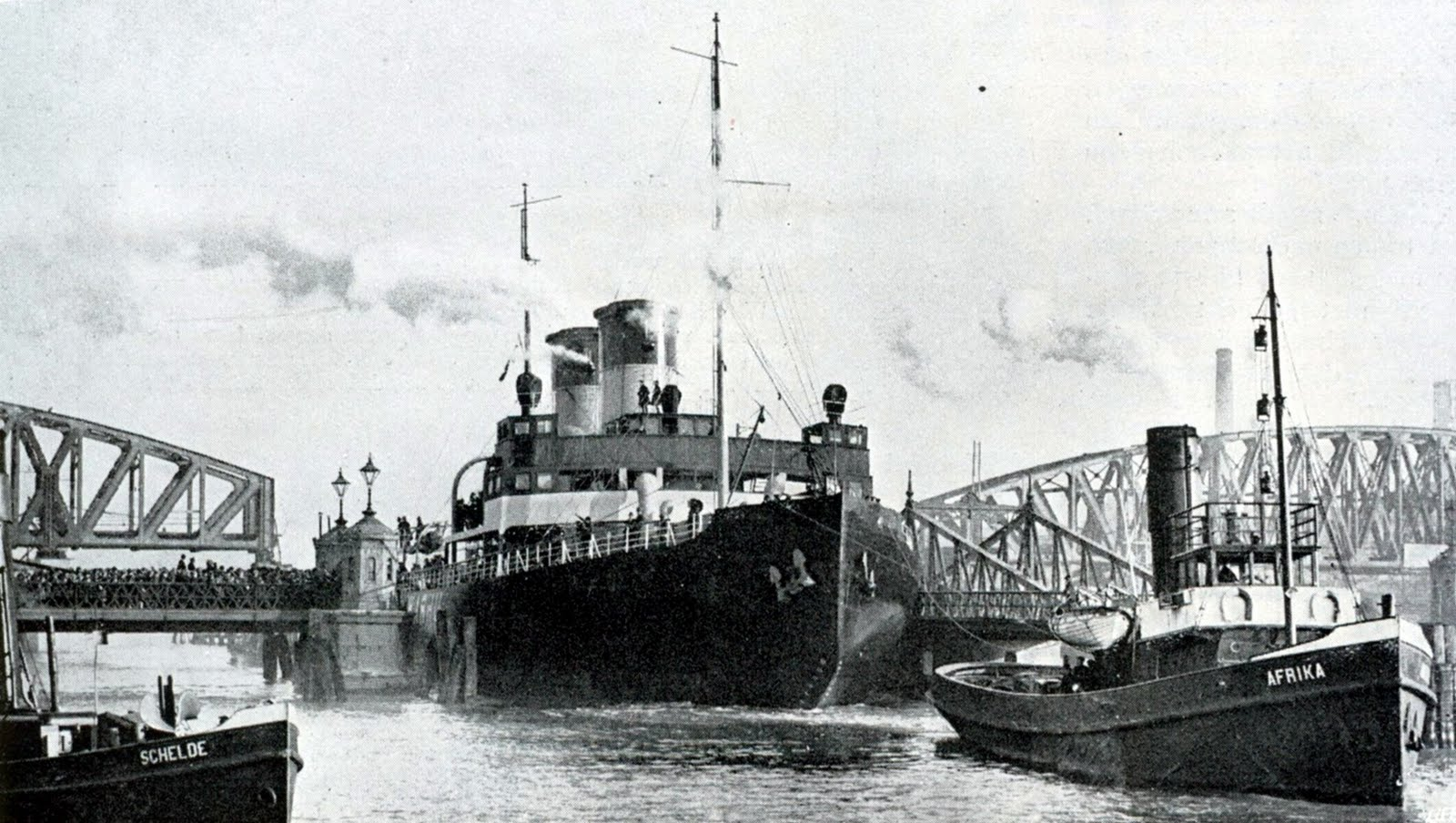
Jääkarhu leaving for sea trials in Rotterdam.

When the Treaty of Tartu was signed on 14 October 1920, Finland agreed to return the Russian icebreakers that the Finnish White Guard had seized during the Civil War in 1918. As a result, the largest and most powerful state-owned icebreaker of Finland at that time, Wäinämöinen, was handed over to Estonia in 1922. Since both the size of the ships calling at the Finnish winter ports and the amount of exported goods, especially forest products, had increased considerably since the First World War, there was a definite need for a large and powerful icebreaker. One of the key issues was the beam of the existing icebreakers, 14 metres (46 ft), which was not enough for the new ships used to transport goods across the Atlantic Ocean.

In 1923, the state allocated FIM 10 million for the design and development of a new icebreaker based on the experiences gained during the four years that Wäinämöinen had spent under the Finnish flag. The basic design of the new vessel, which was to have a beam of at least 18 metres (59 ft), was awarded to experienced Finnish naval architects K. Albin Johansson and Ossian Tybeck.

By June 1923, bids ranging from FIM 20.2 to 35.5 million had been received from 24 shipyards representing eight nationalities. The most expensive offer was received from the Finnish Sandvikens Skeppsdocka och Mekaniska Verkstads Ab that was already building another new icebreaker, Voima, in Helsinki. In the end, the contract was awarded to the Dutch shipbuilder P. Smit Jr. Shipbuilding and Machine Factory from Rotterdam. The shipyard had recently constructed four ice-strengthened ships for the Finland Steamship Company and the technical director of the company had personally spent several weeks on board the Finnish icebreaker Sampo during the past winter.

The contract for the construction of a new icebreaker was signed on 17 April 1924 after the Dutch government and the town council of Rotterdam agreed to subsidize the construction costs by 175,000 Dutch guilders, bringing the final cost to ƒ1,563,000 (FIM 26,000,000). She was launched on 26 August 1925 and given the name Jääkarhu, Finnish for polar bear. Curiously, her namesake animal is not a native species to Finland. As the new icebreaker was being built, Captain Johan Rosqvist, who has previously commanded Sampo, was selected as the first captain of the new icebreaker, and in the summer of 1925 he travelled to Rotterdam together with a chief engineer and a second engineer to supervise the construction and outfitting of his new ship.

On 13 January 1926 Jääkarhu was ready for first sea trials in the North Sea. Although there were still issues with the oil-fired boilers by late February, it was agreed to take the delivery of the new icebreaker on 2 March 1926 and solve the problems later as the winter of 1926 had turned out to be very severe. Despite the best efforts of existing Finnish state-owned icebreakers, the ice conditions in the Gulf of Finland and the Sea of Åland were extremely difficult and vast pack ice fields closed off the shipping lanes outside the island of Utö at the edge of the Archipelago Sea.

Although sometimes called the largest and most powerful icebreaker in the world by the press in the 1920s, Jääkarhu was no match for the Soviet polar icebreakers Yermak and Svyatogor that had nearly twice the displacement and over twice the power of the Finnish icebreaker. However, as a Baltic escort icebreaker she was considered better than the giants and was often compared with the Soviet icebreaker Lenin, which was roughly of the same size and was considered a very successful design.

== Career ==
=== Early career ===
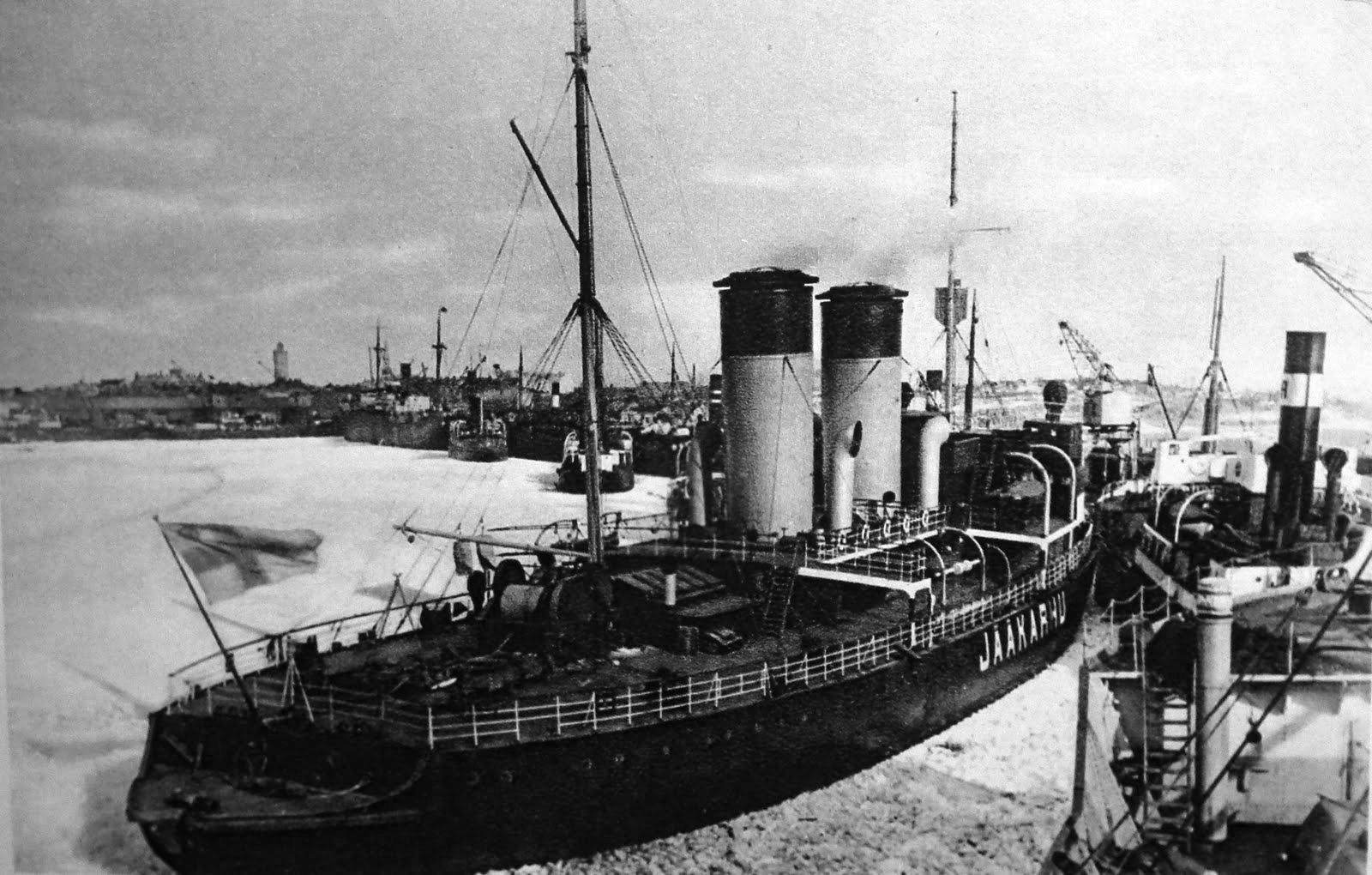
Jääkarhu in the port of Hanko.

Jääkarhu left Rotterdam on 3 March 1926. When the new icebreaker arrived in Finland on 7 March, she was welcomed by a number of icebound ships outside Utö. After Sampo had arrived from Hanko with the Minister of Commerce and Industry, Tyko Reinikka, other representatives of the state, and members of the press, the newest and largest state-owned icebreaker demonstrated her power by easily overcoming the notorious pack ice fields surrounding the island and escorting a convoy of three merchant ships to the open seas. After spending her first winter escorting ships in the Gulf of Finland, Jääkarhu arrived in Helsinki on 27 April 1926. In July she was drydocked in Liepāja, Latvia, where her bottom was repainted.

In 1926, Jääkarhu became the first Finnish icebreaker to adopt Finnish as the command language. Since the officers and most of the crew spoke Swedish as their first language, this resulted in negative comments from the Swedish-speaking minority, which considered Finnish to be "the language of the peasants", and even concerns about the safety of navigation. Captain Juho Lehtonen, who had replaced Rosqvist in July 1926, even received hate mail from Swedish-speaking citizens, some of whom questioned his professional competence after a minor collision with a Swedish steamer Yrsa on 18 January 1927.

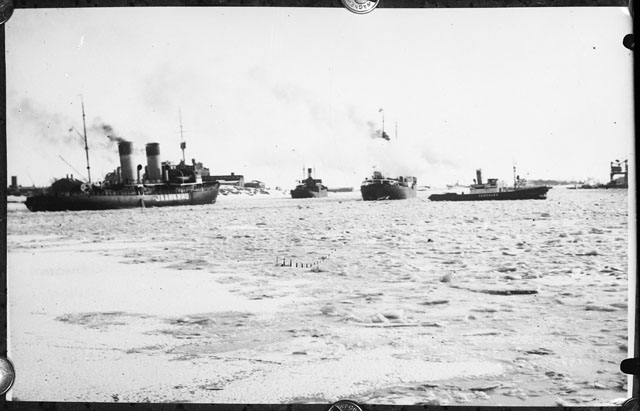
Jääkarhu assisting icebound merchant ships in a Finnish port.

With the exception of the winter of 1929, the winters from 1927 until 1939 were relatively mild. Since Jääkarhu was the most expensive to operate among the Finnish state-owned icebreakers, she saw little action during these years as she was always the last icebreaker to leave, beginning her season Helsinki and then moving to Hanko, and the first one to return. During very mild winters she was not put into service at all.

However, the winter of 1929 was extremely difficult and by February the Baltic Sea was covered by ice all the way to the Danish Straits. Finnish, Swedish and Soviet icebreakers were sent to escort merchant ships through the straits, and on 22 February 1929 Jääkarhu was ordered to head south with a convoy of ships carrying export goods, assist and escort any icebound ship along the way and return with an inbound convoy to Turku and Hanko. She left on 24 February with a convoy of 12 ships and arrived at the edge of ice near Copenhagen on 4 March. After spending a few days assisting ships in the southern Baltic Sea, Jääkarhu began her journey home on 8 March and arrived in Hanko on 12 March. During the past 15 days she had, in addition to the ships in her own convoys, released and assisted 24 other ships and sailed 2,140 nautical miles (3,960 km; 2,460 mi).

=== Second World War ===
When relations with the Soviet Union deteriorated in late 1939 and the Winter War began on 30 November 1939, the Finnish state-owned icebreakers were armed and assigned to a wartime icebreaker flotilla. Jääkarhu was sent to the Gulf of Bothnia to escort ships across the Sea of Åland. Although she was often attacked by Soviet bombers, the enemy never scored a direct hit on the icebreaker, giving her a reputation of a lucky ship among the Finnish seafarers. After the Winter War ended with the 1940 Moscow Peace Treaty, Jääkarhu opened a channel to the icebound port of Hanko and helped to evacuate the city and the surrounding islands that had been leased to the Soviet Union as a naval base. During the period which later became known as the Interim Peace, Jääkarhu resumed her peacetime duties as an escort icebreaker in the Gulf of Finland.

When the Continuation War started in June 1941, the state-owned icebreakers were again called to arms. On 13 September 1941, icebreakers Tarmo and Jääkarhu participated in Operation Nordwind together with Finnish and German naval ships. The joint Finnish-German distraction manoeuvre was a complete failure. Not only did it fail to achieve its goal – it is uncertain if the Soviet forces even noticed the fleet – but when the ships turned back, paravanes dragged a Soviet naval mine against the hull of Finnish coastal defence ship Ilmarinen, the flagship of the Finnish Navy, which sank in seven minutes following the explosion, claiming 271 lives.

During the extremely difficult winter of 1942, Jääkarhu was paired up with the diesel-electric Sisu. On 2 February 1942, she ran aground while assisting an icebound convoy of six cargo ships, damaging her bow propeller. After returning from a dry dock in Stockholm, Sweden, Jääkarhu resumed her duties in the Gulf of Finland, and together with Sisu she escorted almost 700 merchant ships through the ice-infested waters.

The winters of 1943 and 1944 were milder and Jääkarhu, being more expensive to operate than the smaller state-owned icebreakers, was not taken into service. When the Continuation War ended with the signing of the Moscow Armistice on 19 September 1944, Finland was forced to hand over its best ice-strengthened tonnage to the Soviet Union as war reparations. This included the newest steam-powered icebreakers Jääkarhu and Voima.

=== Later Soviet service ===
Jääkarhu and Voima were officially handed over to the Soviet Union as war reparations on 24 February 1945 after having been stationed in Leningrad since December 1944. Jääkarhu was renamed Sibiryakov after Alexander Mikhaylovich Sibiryakov, a Russian explorer of the Arctic regions, and another Russian icebreaker that had been sunk by the German cruiser Admiral Scheer in August 1942.

During her time under the Soviet flag, Sibiryakov was a common sight in the Gulf of Finland and her familiar profile was easily recognized by the Finnish seafarers despite her Soviet colors and insignia. In the mid-1950s, she was sent to Rotterdam for modernization, which included installing two radar antennas and adding a new superstructure between the smoke stacks.

Being one of the last large steam-powered icebreakers in active service, Sibiryakov was used in a 1960s Soviet documentary film to represent the steam-powered icebreaker, Yermak, which had been broken up in 1964. She was also used in the 1969 Soviet/Italian film The Red Tent to represent another Soviet icebreaker, Krasin, which had participated in the rescue mission of Umberto Nobile and other survivors of the crash of airship Italia in 1928. While the original 1917-built icebreaker was still in service at that time, her extensive rebuilding in 1953–1960 had changed the look of the vessel completely and thus a more traditional-looking icebreaker was needed for the role.

Sibiryakov was retired after the winter of 1972 and sold for scrap. As the summer turned to autumn, she left the Baltic Sea for La Spezia, Italy, arriving at the breakers on 16 October 1972.

== Technical details ==
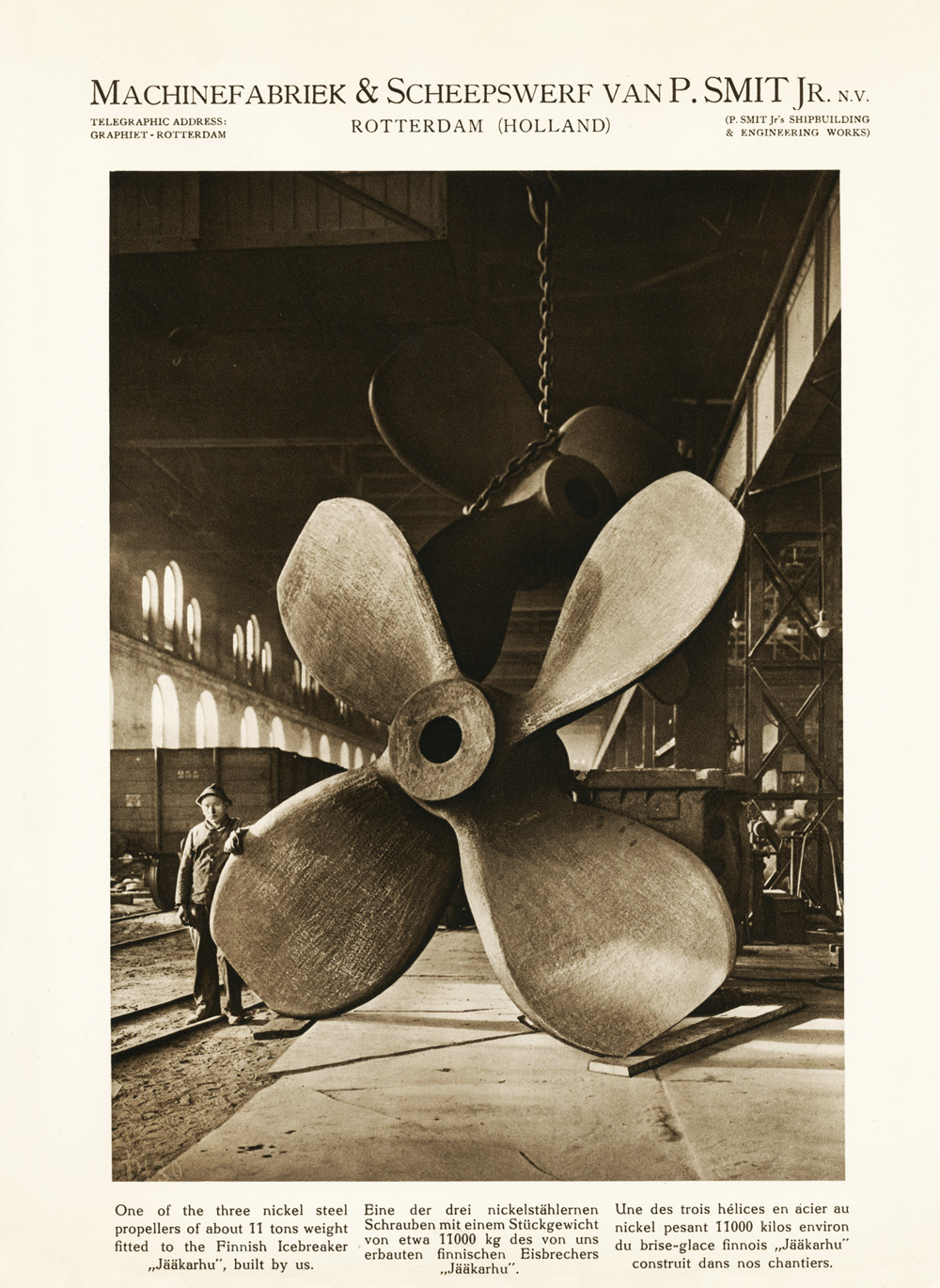
Two of the three propellers installed on Jääkarhu used in an advertisement for the shipyard.

Jääkarhu was 78.5 metres (258 ft) long overall and 75 m (246 ft) at the waterline. Her hull had a moulded breadth of 19.28 metres (63.3 ft) and was 18.50 metres (60.7 ft) wide at the waterline. Her displacement was 4,836 tons at a draft of 6.5 metres (21 ft). These main dimensions made Jääkarhu by far the largest icebreaker in service under the Finnish flag at that time – she was more than 10 metres (33 ft) longer and 4.5 metres (15 ft) wider than the second-largest icebreaker, Tarmo, and had more than twice the displacement. Only the old Wäinämöinen, handed over to Estonia in 1922, came close with an overall length of 75.4 metres (247 ft), beam of 19.2 metres (63 ft) and displacement of 3,619 tons. Her bow, which had slightly rounder lines than the previous Finnish icebreakers, had a stem angle of 23–25 degrees and her hull, protected by an ice belt up to 28.6 millimetres (1.13 in) thick, was divided into eight compartments by watertight transverse bulkheads. With a crew of 47, Jääkarhu had the largest crew among the Finnish steam-powered icebreakers even though she required less stokers than the older icebreakers due to her oil-fired boilers.

Jääkarhu was also the most powerful steam-powered icebreaker ever commissioned in Finland. Her three triple-expansion steam engines, two with a maximum continuous rating of 2,500 ihp driving four-bladed nickel steel propellers weighing about 11 tons each in the stern at 120 rpm, and one turning a third propeller of the same size in the bow at 130 rpm with a maximum continuous rating of 2,600 ihp. However, for short periods of time during icebreaking operations, the combined output of the engines could reach 9,200 ihp. Unlike the previous coal-burning icebreakers, Jääkarhu had eight oil-fired boilers with mechanical ventilation that consumed 2.5 to 4.5 tons of fuel oil per hour. Although she was the most expensive to operate, and for that reason she was always the last one to enter service and first one to sail back to her summer moorings, her endurance and range were considerably better than those of the older icebreakers since she could hold nearly 1,000 tons of fuel and required refueling only two or three times during normal winters.

Like the old Wäinämöinen, Jääkarhu had a heeling system with two pumps capable of transferring 650 tons of ballast water per hour between side tanks, heeling the vessel up to five degrees in ten minutes. In addition, she had six centrifugal pumps for moving 100 tons of water in five minutes between the fore and aft peak tanks to adjust her trim and release the icebreaker from compressive ice. For escort operations she had a towing winch and a stern notch that was considerably larger than in the older icebreakers. Her single piece cast iron rudder weighed 9 tons.

== Bibliography ==
- Kaukiainen, Yrjö (1992). Navigare Necesse – Merenkulkulaitos 1917–1992. Jyväskylä: Gummerus Kirjapaino Oy. ISBN 978-951-47-6776-0.
- Laurell, Seppo (1992). Höyrymurtajien aika. Jyväskylä: Gummerus Kirjapaino Oy. ISBN 978-951-47-6775-3.
- Ramsay, Henrik (1949). Jääsaarron murtajat. Helsinki: Werner Söderström Osakeyhtiö (WSOY).
