= Helsingfors Skeppsdocka =

Former shipbuilder in Helsinki (1865–1894)

Helsingfors Skeppsdockas Ab
- Native name: Swedish: Helsingfors Skeppsdockas Aktiebolag; Finnish: Helsingin Laivatelakka Osakeyhtiö
- Type: Osakeyhtiö
- Industry: Shipbuilding
- Founded: 4 March 1865; 161 years ago in Helsinki, Grand Duchy of Finland
- Founder: Adolf Törngren
- Defunct: 17 December 1894
- Fate: Bankruptcy
- Successor: AB Sandvikens Skeppsdocka och Mekaniska Verkstad
- Headquarters: Hietalahti, Helsinki, Grand Duchy of Finland
- Owners: Adolf Törngren (→29 Sept 1866); Tampereen Pellava- ja Rauta-Teollisuus Oy (29 Sept 1866 − 30 April 1880); Oskar Eklund (1880−1894)

Helsingfors Skeppsdockas Aktiebolag was a shipbuilding company that operated out of Hietalahti shipyard in Helsinki, Grand Duchy of Finland, between 1865 and 1894.

The company was founded in 1865 by industrialist Adolf Törngren, who fell under financial difficulties during construction work. The ownership was transferred to Tampere Linen and Iron Industry, which had to complete the investments totalling over one million Finnish marks. The company built an over 90 metres long dry dock and a number of workshops. The dock was used for repairs and newbuilding projects, and the workshops produced various machinery parts and consumer products.

Until the turn of 1880s Helsingfors Skeppsdocka had not reached a satisfactory level of profitability, and the parent company decided to sell it despite significant loss. The new owner, Oskar Eklund, started an investment programme constructing new workshops and enlarging the premises. The company enlarged its portfolio to railway wagons. Despite a fairly good order intake, Helsingfors Skeppsdocka fell into bankruptcy in 1894 due to difficulties in funding arrangements.

A year after a new company, Hietalahti Shipyard and Engineering Works was established to continue operations in the premises.

== Background ==
The Helsinki seafaring started to develop after the centre was moved to its current location in 1640. In 1670 a dockyard was established in South Harbour to serve the recently founded Sveaborg Fortress. Until the early 19th century, Finnish merchant ships were built by number of small yards, Ostrobothnia being the predominant shipbuilding area. By time Turku took over the role as the leading Finnish shipbuilding centre.

While Helsinki had become capital of Finland in 1812, its significance as seafaring and shipbuilding centre remained low, until railway lines to Hämeenlinna and Saint Petersburg were built.

== Foundation ==
Industrialist Adolf Törngren left an application for starting a shipyard and engineering works in Helsinki magistrate on 2 August 1864. At the same time he applied for the premises an area in Hietalahti which consisted of 12,200 m^{2} land and 9,500 m^{2} water. After an assent of the city elders, the magistrate decided on 14 September to lease the area to Törngren for a 500 silver marks' annual sum. The application was subsequently assented by the Uusimaa Province governor and Senate Manufacturing Board, after which the Finnish Senate Finance Committee granted the permission on 4 March 1865.

== Construction ==
=== Plans and leadership ===
Törngren selected engineer Lieutenant Fridolin Stjernvall to make plans for the yard layout. Stjernvall visited in Stockholm and Oskarshamn in Sweden and in Holten in Norway to gather knowledge. Stjernvall's plans were approved by the magistrate on 10 June 1865. The construction project was led by engineer Theodor Tallqvist, who made some changes to Stjernvall's plans.

=== Funding crisis ===
The construction project was halted in 1866 because Törngren got run out of cash; by then the costs had reached to 200,000 marks. Törngren made an arrangement, after which the company ownership was transferred to Tampereen Pellava- ja Rauta-Teollisuus ("Tampere Linen and Iron Industry"), to which he owed 435,000 marks. The work was continued under the same leadership after the transaction. The board of Tampere Linen and Iron Industry presumably planned selling the yard soon after the construction work was to be finished, but the size of the additional investment cost was vastly underestimated; until April 1867 the construction work had required another 194,000 marks from the company and a government loan of 100,000 marks, and by the end of the year, when the yard was finally operative, the parent company and its owners had credited the shipyard by further 355,000 marks. Tampere Linen and Iron Industry tried to sell the company to the Imperial Russian government, but the offer was rejected. Next plan was creating a shipbuilding company with one million marks' capital and selling the majority of shares to Russian owners, but the potential buyers wanted to start production of rolling stock, for which the yard's premises were not suitable.

=== Workshops ===
In 1866 he parent company appointed Swedish engineer Hermann Kaufmann to technical manager of the engineering works. The first tools, which were three metal lathes, tapping machine, two planing machines, press and circular saw for metal, were brought from Tampere and the workshop was taken into use in 1867. After the second part of the construction was completed in the same year, the premises consisted separate carpentry shop and planing mill. A foundry was built alongside the engineering shop.

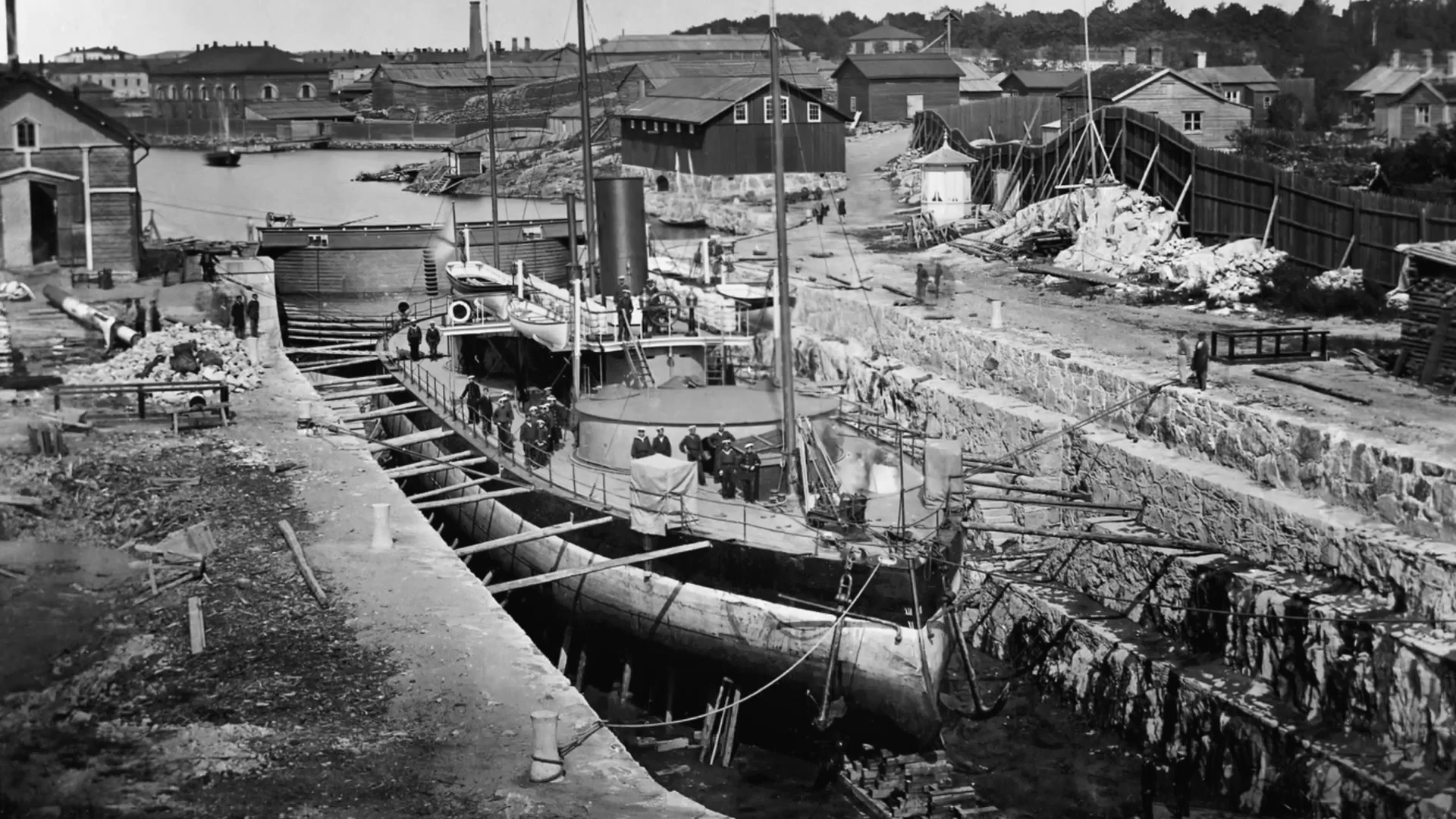
Russian monitor Rusalka docked in Hietalahti in 1868.

=== Dry dock ===
The dry dock was 91.5 metres long, 16.3 metres wide and 5.5 metres deep from water level. The pump machinery consisted of a main pump and additional centrifugal pump; they were operated by a single-cylinder 85−90-ihp steam engine and a Cornwall boiler, or two traction engines, which were used as backup power source. Leakage water was pumped out by Worthington pump. The wooden gate was designed in a similar way as the Swedish Oskarshamn dock gate and made by Ostrobothnian carpenters who had fled from their homes due to the prevailing famine. The gate launching ceremony took place on 13 November 1867 at 2−4 pm; the yard was decorated by flags and a large crowd witnessed the event. When the gate was lowered, it pushed away a large mass of water, and the gate foundation failed plunging the nearest bystanders into water; however, all of them were rescued to rowing boats. After the reinstalling the gate and inspection by authorities, the dock was ready to use. Another milestone was reached when the first docking took place in April 1868, again during presence of crowd. The vessel was steamship Constantin operated by Syd-Finska Kustångfartygbolaget.

In addition, a cradle with possibly with just few hundred tonne of capacity was built in 1867; another one was built in 1869.

The number of construction workers was 300. The official launching ceremony of the shipyard took place in December 1868. The estimated headcount at the initial stage was between 50 and 100.

== First operating years ==
The scale of business was too small to be able to cover the investment, which by June 1868 had reached 898,000 marks. Sales and number of employees remained low at the early 1870s; in 1870 Helsingfors Skeppsdocka reached sales of 82,700 marks and employed 31 people; in 1871 the sales were 124,000 marks with headcount of 76 people. The latter sum includes 53,000 marks for extension of steamship Lloyd, which has been a demanding project.

Kaufmann left the company at the end of 1871 and he was followed by skilled and innovative engineer C. G. Hult. He initiated and led construction of a modern engineering workshop, which was built in 1873–1875. The building consisted forging shop, engineering shop, carpentry shop, foundries for iron and brass, and offices for drafting and management. The machinery was powered by a 44-ihp steam engine and boiler, both built in the company's own workshops. Later the output turned out to be insufficient, which was solved by auxiliary power units. The cost of the investment was 100,000 marks, after which the total investment on the yard exceeded 1,000,000 marks.

Shipbuilding was in upswing in the 1870s and Helsingfors Skeppsdocka built total 16 steam launches and tugboats with iron hull and a number of wooden barges, rescue boats and other vessels. The engineering shop produced centrifugal pumps, power hammers, safes, steam winches, steam engines, steam boilers and large variety of smaller tools and consumer goods. In 1876 the company presented its products together with the parent company in art and industrial fair held in Kaivopuisto.

Hult left the company and emigrated to Sweden in 1878. Engineer Oswald Bonsdorff, a skilled shipbuilder, was appointed to company manager and the new technical manager was A. F. Fogelqvist, who had good theoretical knowledge.

== Losses and new ownership ==
Despite the favourable economical situation, the profitability was far from satisfactory level. By 1877 Helsingfors Skeppsdocka owed 1,240,000 marks to Tampere Linen and Iron Industry. The company faced difficult times during the following two years; a significant cause was 54,000 marks' loss from four tug steamers delivered to the Russian Admiralty. By now the owner had come to conclusion, that the company will not reach a such profitability that it could repay the investment, and started to consider ways to get rid of the shipbuilder despite the losses. According to an alternative plan, the dock and engineering works were to be separated to two different companies, and the dock was to be sold to cover the losses. In a general meeting held on 5 November 1978, the board suggested selling the dock, pump station and gate to a new company for 700,000 marks; the planned initial capital for the new dock company would be 800,000 marks. The proposal was approved, but not put into practice. In the meantime, the owner negotiated with three prospective purchasers for the business: a Saint-Petersburg-base British trading house, an unnamed domestic person and an agent.

The dock and the associated machinery had a book value of 440,000 marks, but due to low usage, it had brought just 6,200 marks' average annual gross income during 1870–1879, which was not enough to cover even the costs. The engineering works was the only profitable part of the company; during 1870–1876 it brought an average annual profit of 40,000 marks; however, this was not enough to repay the investment, as the value of the engineering works was set to 286,000 marks without inventory. An analysis presented in an extraordinary general meeting on 11 September 1879 suggested that the engineering works including the inventory could be sold for 483,000 marks, whereas the dock shall be regarded valueless. The board did not share the view that the dock worths nothing. The following general meeting took place one week after, and Tampere Linen and Iron Industry decided to set the value of Helsingfors Skeppsdocka to total 700,000 marks, of which the dock was 150,000 marks. The shipbuilding company was planned to take over liabilities of 300,000 marks and the owning company got 4,000 shares, each worth of 100 marks; some of the shares were planned to be transferred to the company owners. The plan was cancelled, because the state did not allow transferring the liabilities to Helsingfors Skeppsdocka. The balance for year 1879 showed 71,000 marks' loss, which further increased the desire to sell the company.

Finally, in April 1880, Helsingfors Skeppsdocka was sold to engineer Oskar Eklund for 425,000 marks, of which 200,000 marks consisted of liabilities. The owner's decision to sell the business was encouraged by loss of 47,000 marks created during the four operating months of 1880.

== Enlargement ==
After taking over the company, Eklund started to improve on the premises; many buildings were wooden and inappropriately planned, because the previous owner had not wanted to invest more on the plant than necessary. The state gave him a 100,000-marks' loan to fund the improvements; in addition to this, Eklund had to carry the 200,000 marks' liabilities which were transferred to him when buying the yard. Eklund had operated another yard in Helsinki before and he was an experienced shipbuilder. In 1880 the yard was connected to electrical grid, which improved productivity. The yard area was restructured in 1884; the first new building was a sheet metal workshop, an investment that cost 150,000 marks. A new office building, designed by Eklund together with architect Theodor Höijer, was constructed in 1886. The ground floor was made from brick and the wooden upper included the manager's residence. In 1889 the yard constructed a new boiler building, which was equipped with an old boiler of S/S Hoppet. The main cradle was modernised an its capacity was increased possibly up to 500 tonnes or even more. In 1889 the company extended to rolling stock, when Eklund made a contract for delivering railway wagons. The new line of production required investments on facilities, and a new workshop and a railway line were constructed. Eklund rented more land from the city, and by 1894 the area covered 16,705 m^{2}.

The business run well during the 1880s. In 1882 Eklund the company got a new chief engineer, J. W. Forsberg, under whose leadership the company built a number of steamships, steamboats and lightvessels. The value of production reached 496,000 marks in 1884. At the time, especially the sales of the company foundry was at high level. In 1888 the sales in docking reached to 167,801 marks and by the end of the decade the headcount was 125. During 1880–1888 the average annual sales were 329,000 marks and net profit 60,000 marks.

== Bankruptcy ==
Despite the good sales, the company suffered continuously from lack of capital. Situation turned worse in the early 1890s, when Helsingfors Skeppsdocka fell into trouble due to difficulties in loan arrangements. Due to shortage of cash, operation were halted for a large part of year 1894 and the headcount was reduced to 89 people. The main creditor, Union Bank of Finland, set two representatives to manage the company. The company was declared to bankruptcy on 17 December 1894.

== Re-establishment ==
After the bankruptcy, the operations were continued under management of trustees of the bankruptcy estate. The estate was auctioned on 3 October 1895 to merchant J. C. Burmeister who continued the operations with his business partners. The new company was called Aktiebolaget Sandvikens Skeppsdocka och Mekaniska Verkstad ("Hietalahti Shipyard and Engineering Works Ltd"). The articles of association were confirmed by the Senate already on 25 October.

== Sources ==
- Osakeyhtiö Hietalahden Sulkutelakka ja Konepaja — aikaisemmin Helsingfors Skeppsdocka [Hietalahti Shipyard and Engineering Works Limited — formerly Helsinki Shipyard] (in Finnish). Helsinki: Osakeyhtiö Hietalahden Sulkutelakka ja Konepaja. 1935.

== See also ==
- List of ships built at Hietalahti shipyard (1–200)
