= Sandvikens Skeppsdocka och Mekaniska Verkstad =

Former shipbuilder in Helsinki (1895–1938)

Aktiebolaget Sandvikens Skeppsdocka och Mekaniska Verkstad
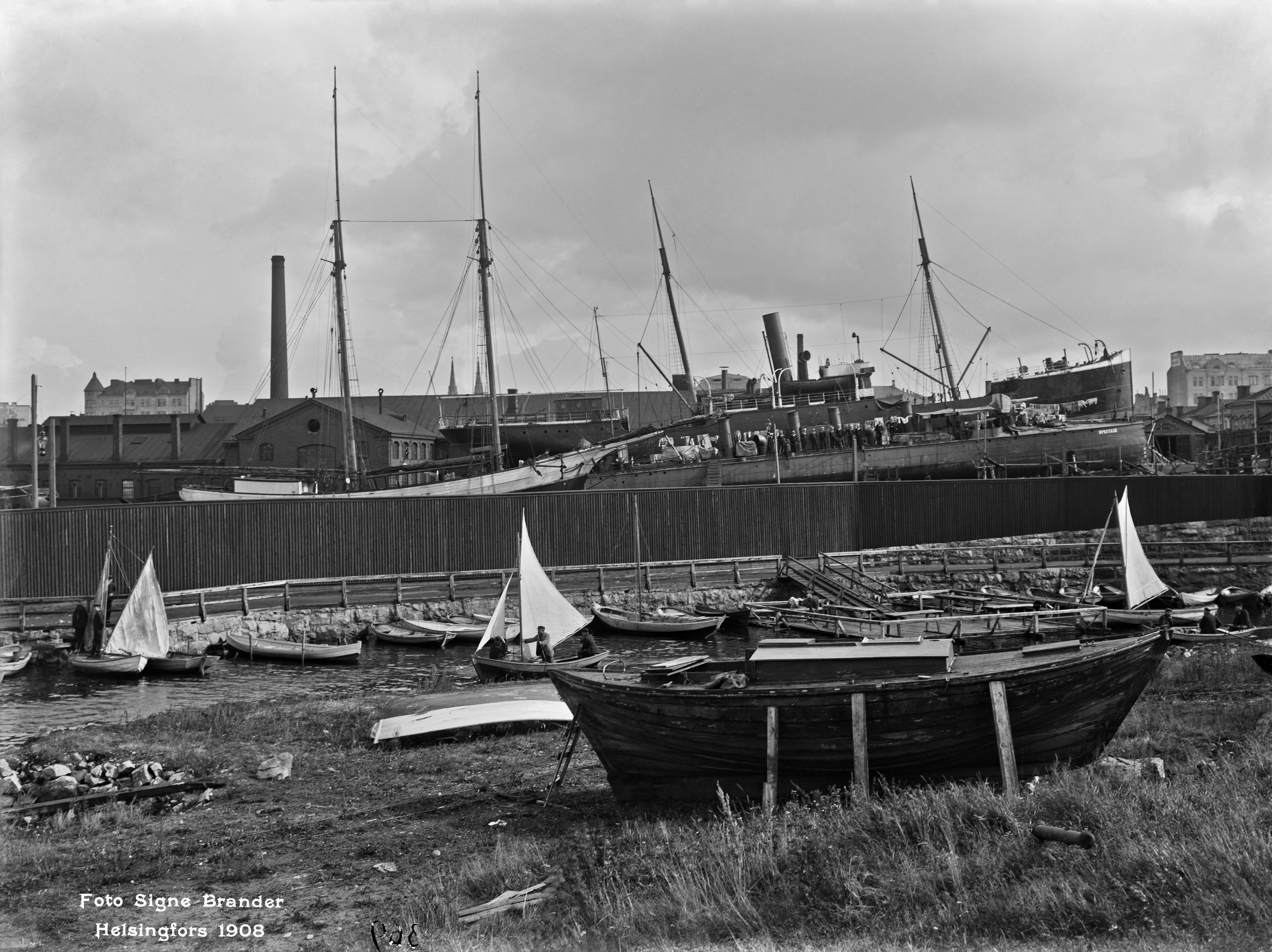
- Hietalahti shipyard area in 1908.
- Native name: Swedish: Aktiebolaget Sandvikens Skeppsdocka och Mekaniska Verkstad; Finnish: Osakeyhtiö Hietalahden Sulkutelakka ja Konepaja
- Company type: osakeyhtiö
- Industry: shipbuilding
- Predecessor: Helsingfors Skeppsdocka
- Founded: 25 October 1895; 130 years ago in Helsinki, Grand Duchy of Finland
- Founders: J. C. Burmeister; Edvin Bergroth; Alfred Norrmén; Theodor Tallqvist; Paul Sinebrychoff; Theodor Stude; A. Einighorst; Victor Ek
- Defunct: 1938
- Fate: amalgamated into Wärtsilä
- Successor: Wärtsilä Hietalahti Shipyard
- Headquarters: Hietalahti, Helsinki, Grand Duchy of Finland (→1917); Finland (1917→)
- Parent: Kone- ja Siltarakennus (1926–1935); Wärtsilä (1935 →)

Aktiebolaget Sandvikens Skeppsdocka och Mekaniska Verkstad (Finnish: Osakeyhtiö Hietalahden Sulkutelakka ja Konepaja; 'Hietalahti Shipyard and Engineering Works Ltd.') was a Finnish shipbuilding and engineering company that operated in Helsinki in 1895–1938. The company was set up to continue shipbuilding at Hietalahti shipyard, after its predecessor Helsingfors Skeppsdocka, which operated the yard in 1865–1895, had bankrupted.

The company portfolio consisted of the building and repairing of ships and the production of tram and railway wagons, boilers, steam and combustion engines, winches and other products. Before and during the First World War the main customers were the Imperial Russian Navy and the Finnish State Railways. Following the Finnish Declaration of Independence in 1917, the Finnish Civil War broke out in 1918. The yard was closed until the Red Guards had left the city.

Due to recession in shipbuilding the company owners decided to sell the shares to another Helsinki engineering company, Kone- ja Siltarakennus in 1926. In 1935 Kone- ja Siltarakennus was taken over by Wärtsilä, which amalgamated Hietalahti Shipyard and Engineering Works into its own organisation. The yard continued operating under the name Wärtsilä Hietalahti Shipyard after that.

== Background ==
The Hietalahti yard construction was started in 1865 by industrialist Adolf Törngren, who founded the company Helsingfors Skeppsdocka. Törngren soon fell into financial difficulties before the premises were taken into use. By the following year the new owner became Tampere Linen and Iron Industry, which still had to invest a substantial sum of money into buildings, a dock and machinery, before the yard finally became operative. The new owner had planned to sell the yard after commissioning, but it had difficulties reaching a satisfying level of profitability and a prominent new owner. Finally, in 1880 the company was sold to engineer Oskar Eklund. Eklund enlarged the premises, but continuously suffered a lack of funding. In 1895 Helsingfors Skeppsdocka was declared bankrupt by the main creditor, Union Bank of Finland.

== Foundation ==
The estate was auctioned on 3 October 1895 to trader J. C. Burmeister for 550,000 marks. The Senate confirmed the company articles of association on 25 October. The new company name was Aktiebolaget Sandvikens Skeppsdocka och Mekaniska Verkstad in Swedish and Osakeyhtiö Hietalahden Sulkutelakka ja Konepaja in Finnish, both meaning 'Hietalahti Shipyard and Engineering Works Ltd.' The founding meeting was held on 18 December 1895. The participants were Burmeister, engineer Edvin Bergroth, bank director Alfred Norrmén, senior engineer Theodor Tallqvist, commercial counsellors Paul Sinebrychoff and Victor Ek and traders Theodor Stude and A. Einighorst. The capital stock was 400,000 marks, and a 250,000 marks' state loan granted to the preceding company was included in the liabilities.

Burmeister, Tallqvist and Norrmén formed the company board; the deputy members were Sinebrychoff and Stude. Einighorst and Ek were comptrollers and their deputies were trader K. H. Renlund and vuorineuvos Albert von Julin. Bergroth was appointed the company manager and Thor Winter became the vice president.

== Initial investments ==
Unlike the preceding operator of the yard, Hietalahti Shipyard and Engineering Works had a good capital base and could directly invest in new machinery. Under Bergroth's determined leadership, the company started a significant investment programme. As docking of ships was considered the core business, the company bought neighbouring houses to get more area around the dry dock, which had very constricted space. The yard area was enlarged towards the city during the following years. In 1896 the company invested in a 30-tonne masting crane. Wooden sheds were gradually replaced by brick buildings, which reduced both fire risk and insurance costs.

Production of rolling stock in the area had started back in 1889, and new facilities were built in 1898 in an area recently gained. As the new premises were next to the railway connection, the transportation of products became easier. During 1898–1899 a new sawmill building was constructed from bricks at the border of the factory area, next to Tokankatu street. A brick pump house was built in 1899 and in the following year it was equipped with a steam-powered centrifugal pump made by Scottish Drysdale & Co. At the same time a new prime power machinery building with a chimney was constructed next to it, at the place of the old sawmill and storage. The boiler installed was a used six-bar steam boiler taken from the shipwrecked Scottish vessel S/S Jupiter.

The wooden gate of the dock was replaced by a steel gate in 1899. In the same year a new central storage area for raw materials was built in the southern part of the area. This building was also made from brick and quarried partly into bedrock.

Other investments from the late 1890s were a two-floor carpenter workshop and paint shop, and a forging furnace. The old rolling stock workshop was renewed for boiler building. All cradles were equipped with rollers – by the year 1900 the yard comprised three cradles.

By the beginning of the 20th century the company employed 300–400 people.

== Early 20th century ==
When Bergroth left the company leadership in May 1900, his follower engineer Adolf Engström received the leadership of a financially solid company. Bergroth continued as a member of the management board.

=== Strikes and changes in political environment ===
The early 20th century was a time of increased labour movement activity; also, the yard and engineering shop workers were dissatisfied by their working conditions. The daily working time was long and salaries low, and despite much responsibility, the workers had hardly any rights. The first notable strike took place in 1902, when the yard smiths went on strike for one month. The action did not lead to favourable results for the workers; instead of reaching a collective agreement, each worker made a personal contract with the employer.

The early 1900s were also politically turbulent due to the russification policy the Empire applied to its autonomous Grand Duchy. This culminated in the assassination of governor-general Bobrikov in 1904. The Russo-Japanese War broke out the same year, and this led to an increased order intake from the Russian military.

In July 1906 the metalworkers went on a general strike which lasted until November, when a collective agreement was reached. Another strike followed in January 1909 and lasted until March, apart from foundry workers who returned to work in April, and steel plate workers who came back in May.

Orders from the Imperial Russia reduced again in 1910 when the Empire re-established its pressure policy towards Finland. The company managed to get sufficient orders from private companies of Russia to compensate for the decline in new public building projects. Moreover, the company received a lot of repair projects from the Imperial Russian Navy.

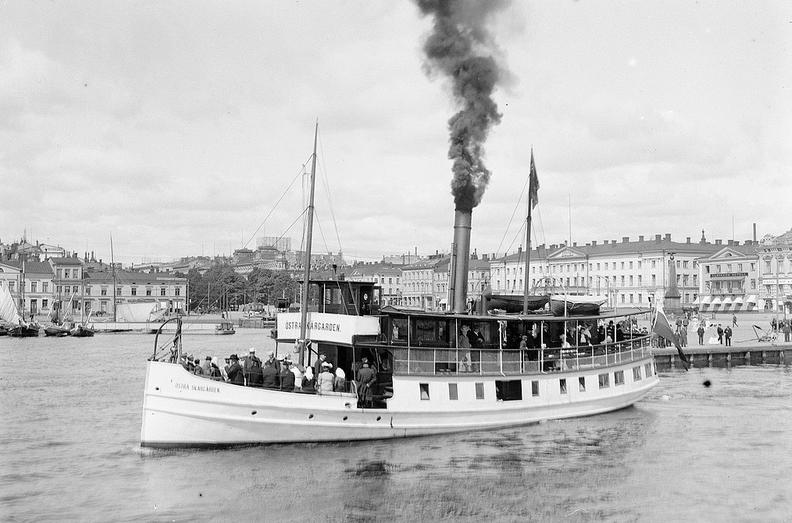
Passenger ship Östra Skärgård built in 1903–1904.

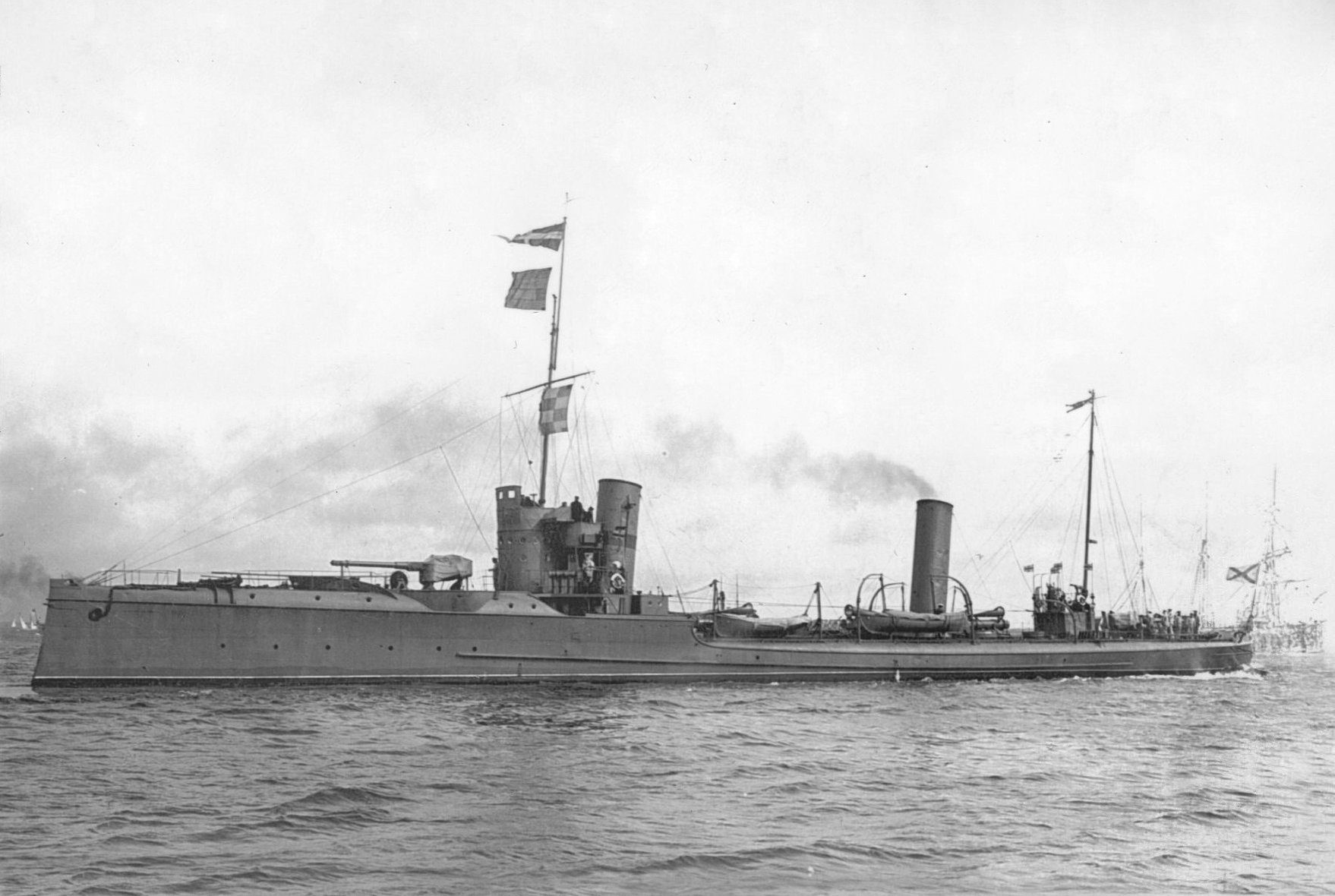
Imperial Russian Torpedo Cruiser Finn built in 1906.

=== Shipbuilding and repairs ===
In year 1900 Hietalahti Shipyard and Engineering Works invested in pneumatic tools. A separate air compressor building was constructed next to the steam boiler building, and the premises were equipped with a comprehensive pressurised air supply network. The new tools increased productivity, especially at the dockyard.

In the early 20th century, the company built passenger ships, tug steamers and other vessels for Finnish and Russian customers. In 1904 the company recruited Theodor Höijer as its shipbuilding master. Höijer was an experienced engineer who had worked in Sweden and the United States.

The size of ships visiting the Finnish harbours had grown by the end of the 19th century, and in order to be able to dock those ships, the dock had to be extended. In 1903 the dock was extended to 96 metres, in 1910 to 100.6 metres and in 1912 to 106.7 metres. After the last enlargement, the company was able to dock the largest ships which visited the Finnish harbours. As the dry dock alone was not enough to meet the demand, the company considered building another similar one or a floating dry dock. The first option was ruled out due to cost reasons, and the second one due to lack of suitable space next to the area. Therefore, the company ended up replacing an 1886-built cradle with a larger one with a 1,500-tonne capacity. The 1907–1908-built new cradle was a significant investment, costing nearly 350,000 marks. Ship repair capabilities were further enhanced by the introduction of welding in 1906 and investments in machinery, including two large lathes in 1908.

Between 1900–1914 the company built at least 60 vessels. Most of the customers were from Russia and other countries around the Baltic Sea. 22 projects were steam launches and passenger steamers, three were coast guard vessels, 20 vessels were tug boats, rescue vessels or icebreakers and 11 were barges. In motor vessels the company used engines produced by Swedish J. & C. G. Bolinders Mekaniska Verkstads AB. About 30 vessels built in 1910–1918 were powered by these engines designed by Erik Rundlöf.

At the end of 1904 the Russian Admiralty ordered first two, then another two torpedo boats, which were delivered in 1907. The drawings and engines came from Germany. The orders were highly profitable and during the building process the company headcount was increased from 700 to 1,000. The project required building an electrogalvanisation facility which operated until 1914. While the order intake of military vessels declined in 1910, the company received significant repair projects: in 1911 three medium-size navy vessels, in 1912 three ships-of-the-line and five smaller vessels, in 1913 one ship of the line and a minelayer. Moreover, in 1914 shortly before the outbreak of the war, nine smaller ships underwent a thorough repair. Also, new ships were constructed in the meantime.

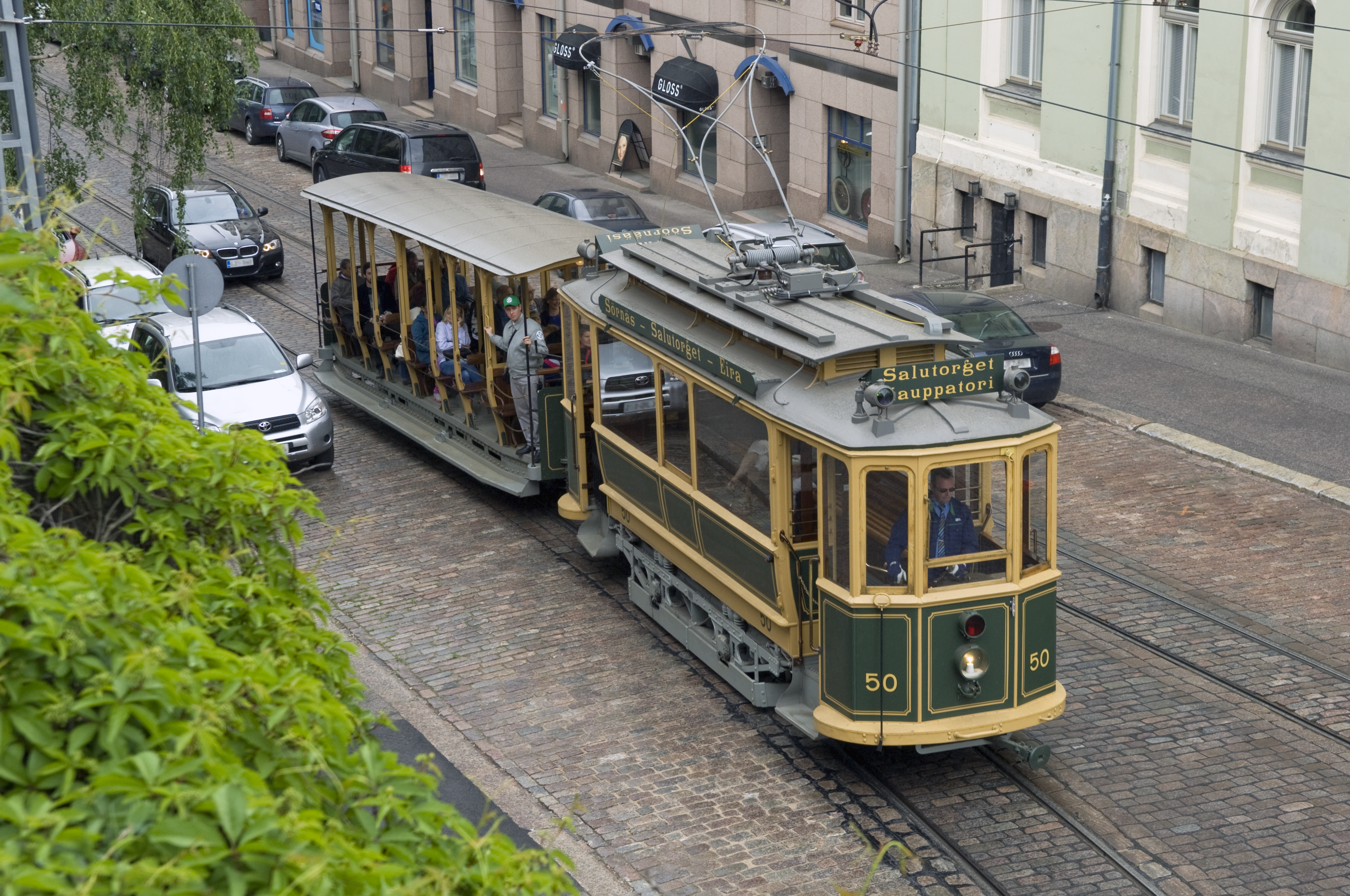
Vintage tram in Helsinki with a wagon produced by Hietalahti Shipyard and Engineering Works.

=== Wagon production ===
As Engström had a lot of earlier experience with rolling stock, his contribution to the company's railway wagon-building was significant. Wagon-building balanced the wintertime pits in demand. The main customer was Finnish State Railways and the other customers were private railway operators with standard 5 ft and narrow gauges. The company produced mainly freight wagons, but also some passenger coaches. The wagon production was ended in 1916, by which point the company had built 1,980 closed and 963 open freight wagons and 80 coaches. This makes Hietalahti Shipyard and Engineering Works the second-largest producer of railway wagons in Finland until then, right after the State Railways' Engineering Works.

The wagon factory produced also other various rolling stock, including 12 tram wagons for Helsinki Tramway and Omnibus company.

=== Other products ===
By 1912 Hietalahti Shipyard and Engineering Works had delivered 140 boilers and 120 steam engines for marine use. For stationary use the company built 190 boilers of various types. The power of boilers ranged up to 400 ihp.

In addition, the company produced pumps, preheaters, winches, anchoring machinery, rudder machinery, engine order telegraphs, filtering devices and a number of other products.

== Beginning of the First World War ==
When the First World War broke out at the beginning of August in 1914, the common belief was that the war would only last for a couple of months at most. The shipyard management did not expect to have many orders, and therefore reduced the headcount. But after a while the order intake increased; the Imperial Russian Army ordered more vessels, ship repair projects and gave various other assignments. The earlier declared ban the Empire had placed on orders from Finnish companies was practically omitted.

Over time the orders exceeded the capacity of the premises. By 1914 the company made plans for a new brass foundry which was taken into use in the same year. A new engineering shop followed two years later. The premises were enlarged significantly in 1915, when the company leased an area which comprised nearly 28,000 m² land and 4,400 m² water. The new area was planned to be used for large naval and cargo ship-building. The company built a new steel plate workshop and model workshop, and in 1917 followed a rib furnace, sawmill and two wooden houses for the company personnel. After constructing new cradles, the total value of the investments reached 1,300,000 marks.

The dry dock was extended from 106.7 metres to 108.9 metres. In 1916 the company bought a house next to the yard area, at the other side of Munkkisaarenkatu, for a residence for its workers.

Between 1914 and 1917 total 400 vessels were docked. 135 were navy vessels which were repaired. In 1916 the company built two large mine countermeasures steamers, which were one year later followed by two nearly alike vessels. In 1917 the company started to build a diesel-powered vessel for the Russian Hydrographic Office. The company headcount exceeded 1,500 people. In 1916 engineer K. Albin Johansson started as shipbuilding master and captain Ludwig Schwindt as vice president.

By 1917 the company share capital reached 6,000,000 marks. Due to the favourable workload, Hietalahti Shipyard and Engineering Works could pay high dividends to its owners. The good order backlog also created problems and risks. After 1915 raw material availability became worse and the prices increased due to the war. The situation worsened in 1917, when strikes, rioting and general disorder increased in many Finnish cities. The workers in Finland demanded the work day to be limited to eight hours; when unruly and armed Russian soldiers joined to support the Finnish workers in April, the employers' association agreed to the demands. This calmed down the environment for the summer, but new troubles followed in the autumn. The atmosphere became restless and the company managers were threatened. The Russian Provisional Government was overthrown in the October Revolution and in the middle of November, a general strike emerged in Finland. Although the strike lasted only for several days, the workload was reduced because the Russian military did not place new orders in the chaotic situation; receiving payment for the ongoing repairs also became uncertain, and the high inflation of the Russian ruble ate the viability.

On 6 December 1917 Finland declared itself independent from Russia.

== Civil War ==
When the Finnish Civil War broke out at the end of January 1918, all production was stopped, just as in all factories in Southern Finland. The last salaries were paid on 5 February, and the white-collar workers left the plant a few days later, after placing all the important documents into a safe place. The Red Guards, who took control in the city, strove to run up the production for their own purposes, but the key personnel went into hiding.

Despite the recently gained independence from Russia, the Russian military was still present in Helsinki but did not take part in the Civil War. The company had receivables worth of 3,000,000 marks from the Russian Navy. As it was impossible to get the payment from the local military council, Schwindt travelled to Petrograd. With the help of Admiral Maximov he succeeded in obtaining the whole payment in rubles, but managed to change just one third of it into Finnish marks, which was then smuggled to Helsinki into a safe place. Schwindt had to leave the rest of the money in Petrograd, where he made deposit agreements with the local branches of Branobel and ASEA. After this Schwindt returned to Finland through Sortavala and joined the White Guard. ASEA paid the saved amount to Hietalahti Shipyard and Engineering Works, but the sum saved to Branobel, over 1.1 million rubles, was lost due to the revolution. The collected money enabled paying the salaries of the white-collar personnel and a dividend to the owners.

During the war, two icebreakers, Silachya and Stadt Reval, had been docked by unwilling support of a yard supervisor the Red Guards had found and captured. Restarting the plant had failed largely because the power grid and machinery had been sabotaged before the supervisors had left the yard. When the war was over, the material stock had been looted and just a part of it was managed to be returned. Work in the company was restarted when the situation returned to normal in April. The employees were taken back after each worker's role in the war was carefully investigated. As many of the company workers had taken part in the war in the Red Guards, and the number of orders had dropped, the number of personnel was significantly reduced from the level it was before the Civil War.

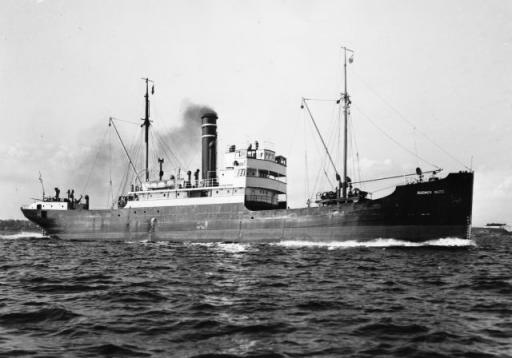
S/S Suomen Neito.

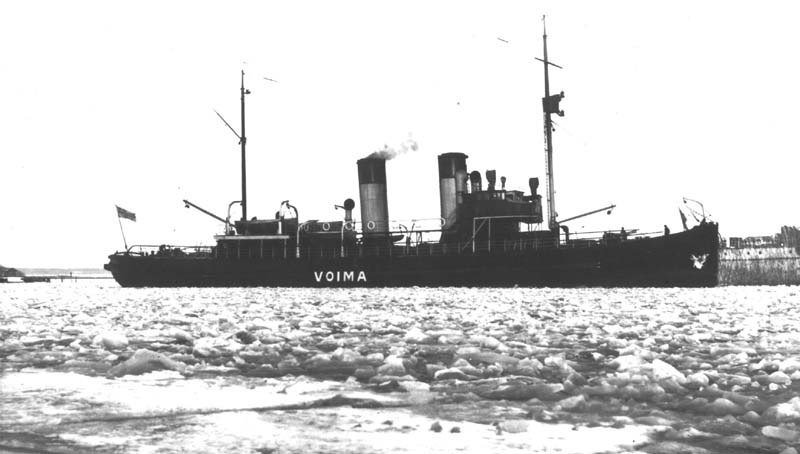
Icebreaker Voima.

== Post-war recession ==
Two mine countermeasures steamers ordered by the Russian Navy and built in 1917 had stayed in the hands of the shipbuilder. The ships were sold to the German Navy, but later further sold to Norway. Their names on the yard order books were Norge and Fritjof.

The company also had to find a new customer for the diesel-powered ship ordered by the Russian Hydrographic Office; she became eventually a part of the Finnish merchant ship fleet and sailed under the name Sunkist.

Manager Adolf Engström left his position in 1919. He was replaced by Walter K. Åström. In the same year the company was sold to a consortium and subsequently almost all board members were changed.

High inflation rates after the war created challenges for the company and required special raw material and labour cost clauses in the contracts. The shipping company Suomen Valtamerentakainen Kauppa Oy, 'Finnish Transcontinental Trading Ltd.', ordered two 1,600-tonne freight steamers. Manager Åström travelled to Germany to gain knowledge and hired a German specialist to lead the construction work. Keels of both ships were laid in October and December 1920 in the recently leased new area. The first vessel, Suomen Poika was launched in July 1921, and the second one, Suomen Neito, in September during the presence of the first president of the republic, K. J. Ståhlberg. Both ships were handed over in 1921 and made a successful career serving the Finnish foreign trade.

After the two large freight ships were completed, the workload went down. There were no new orders for new ships or rolling stock. In 1923 the company received two notable projects: one of them was a minor repair project on a shipwrecked merchant ship. The other one was for completing a semi-finished icebreaker, which had been started at Boecker & Co. shipyard in Tallinn. The Finnish state needed new icebreakers to ensure year-round access to its harbours, and had purchased the hull via John Nurminen company. The icebreaker was named Voima and completed and handed over to the state in 1924. The project was challenging, but the outcome was excellent; it demonstrated the company's capability to undertake demanding projects. However, after these projects the company again suffered a lack of work. Due to the poor situation, the company had to discontinue the lease contract for the new shipbuilding area and sell the buildings and equipment.

== Takeover by Kone ja Silta ==
Åström resigned in 1924 and the new manager became Arvid A. Andersson. The same year, the owning consortium bought the rest of the shares and offered to sell the company first to FÅA. As the shipowner was not interested in expanding its line of business to shipbuilding, the owners started negotiations with Sörnäinen-based Kone- ja Siltarakennus (Kone ja Silta). At first the negotiations did not lead to results. The company decided to start competing with Kone ja Silta by producing steel bridges at dumping prices. Two years later, Kone ja Silta took the offer, and on 22 December 1926 bought the entire share capital. The articles of association were changed in 1927, and after this both companies shared the same management board.

Andersson managed the company until 1926, when K. Albin Johansson took the lead until the end of 1927; after this the company was led by Kone ja Silta manager Julius Stjernvall. In 1929 he was replaced by Robert Lavonius.

After the acquisition the companies divided their portfolios so that shipbuilding and repair projects were concentrated in Hietalahti and bridge and boiler work in Sörnäinen. The old iron foundry was closed down in 1932 and the premises were used for steel plate work thereafter.

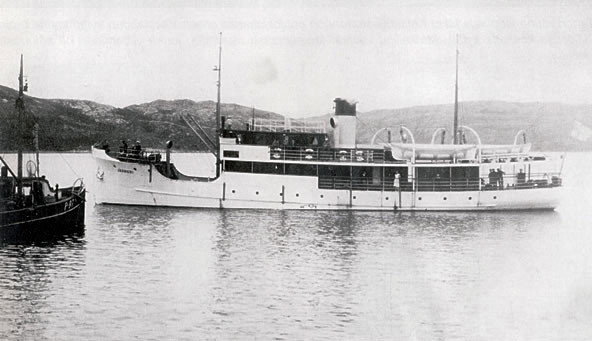
S/S Jäämeri.

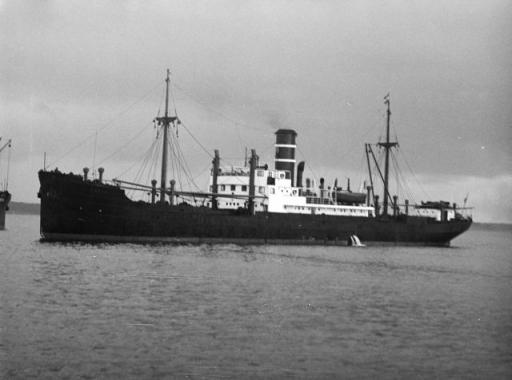
S/S Orion.

== New investment programme ==
As the size of ships was still growing, the old dry dock again began to be too short. Although extending the length by another 3.5 metres helped, the dock was outdated. Neither the depth and width were sufficient anymore for docking of modern icebreakers, such as Jääkarhu. In 1930 the state installed a commission which made an estimate on the required docking capacity for navy and merchant ships. In its report, the commission suggested enlarging and refurbishing the docking facilities in Hietalahti and ordering a floating dock with a capacity of 2,750 tonnes. Politicians and businessmen of Turku lobbied the state to get a dry dock in the local Crichton-Vulcan yard, which also belonged to Kone ja Silta. Finally in 1933 the state gave 1.5 million marks in subsidies to Crichton-Vulcan for the new dry dock and Hietalahti Shipyard and Engineering Works got 2.4 million marks for a floating dock, which was built in Turku because of employment reasons. The floating dock was delivered in December 1933 and its cost was 6,000,000 marks. The first ship to be docked in it was FÅA's Ilmatar. In August 1933 the state gave a three million mark loan for enlarging and modernising the dry dock in Hietalahti. In the meantime the company invested in new pipe and boiler workshops, machinery and a 75-tonne crane, the total sum of investments reaching 20,000,000 marks.

The number of new building projects in 1918−1931 consisted of just 15 vessels, most of them being small barges and warping vessels. The most notable were a small steamer called Rigel and also a mini-submarine, Saukko, built on assignment of the Finnish Navy.

During 1932–1938 Hietalahti Shipyard and Engineering Works got a few orders from the state. One of them was the passenger ship Jäämeri, which was to be operated in Petsamo, a couple of barges, and the icebreaker Otso. In 1934 followed a significant order from FÅA: the 2,800-tonne cargo ship Orion. The ship was propelled by an in-house built engine and she was the largest ship built in Finland until then.

Competition pushed Finnish shipowners to invest in larger vessels, and in 1936 Hietalahti shipyard was fully employed with new building projects.

== Takeover by Wärtsilä ==
The main owner of Kone ja Silta, commercial counsellor Robert Mattson, died in 1935. His shares were sold the same year to Wärtsilä, a company led by the energetic Wilhelm Wahlforss. Lavonius was fired because he did not get along with Wahlforss, and Wahlforss wanted to restructure the organisation. He saw the Kone ja Silta corporation management as a useless intermediate between Wärtsilä management and the subdivisions. Kone ja Silta became fully amalgamated into Wärtsilä in July 1938 and it was confirmed at the general meeting in August. Both companies, Kone ja Silta and Hietalahti Shipyard and Engineering Works, were disestablished. Wärtsilä was now renamed Wärtsilä Group; its subdivisions were Wärtsilä Ironworks, Kone ja Silta, Kotka Mekaniska Verkstad and Hietalahti shipyard. In addition, Wärtsilä owned then Kareliawood, Wärtsilä in Vaasa, Wärtsilä in Jakobstad and 99.52% of Ab Crichton-Vulcan Oy.

== Sources ==
- Osakeyhtiö Hietalahden Sulkutelakka ja Konepaja — aikaisemmin Helsingfors Skeppsdocka [Hietalahti Shipyard and Engineering Works Limited — formerly Helsinki Shipyard] (in Finnish). Helsinki: Osakeyhtiö Hietalahden Sulkutelakka ja Konepaja. 1935.
- Haavikko, Paavo (1984). Wärtsilä 1834–1984 (in Finnish). Oy Wärtsilä Ab. ISBN 951-99542-0-1.

== See also ==
- List of ships built at Hietalahti shipyard (1–200)
- List of ships built at Hietalahti shipyard (201–400)
