= Adolf Törngren =

Finnish jurist and industrialist (1824–1895)

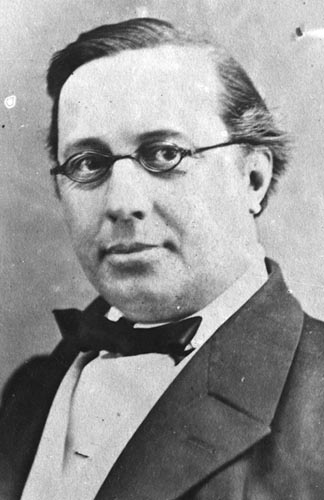
- Born: 27 April 1824; Turku, Grand Duchy of Finland
- Died: 3 March 1895 (aged 70); Tampere, Grand Duchy of Finland
- Education: jurist
- Title: varatuomari
- Board member of: Tampereen Pellava- ja Rauta-Teollisuus Oy
- Spouse: 1849→ Sofia Charlotta née Idestam (1830–1913)
- Children: Anna (1850–1853); Adolf (1852–1853); Charlotta, married Runeberg (1854–1927); Elina (1857–1926); Johanna, married af Schultén (1859–1900); Johan Adolf (1860–1943); Carl Waldemar (1864–1929); Nils Gustaf Arvid (1867–1926); Anna Sofia, married Grönvik (1870–1953)
- Parent(s): Johan Agapetus Törngren and Eva Agatha née Helsingberg

Adolf Törngren (27 April 1824 – 3 March 1895) was a Finnish jurist and industrialist.

Törngren studied law degree, but shortly after he inherited significant property and became industrialist. Törngren operated Nuutajärvi glassworks and later he had a significant role in industrialisation of Tampere. In 1861 he founded Tampere Linen and Iron Industry Ltd together with Gustaf Wasastjerna. Törngren was co-founder of shipbuilding and engineering company Helsingfors Skeppsdocka in Helsinki. His investments drove him into cash crisis, which caused him bankruptcy.

In 1877 Törngren founded Tampere Asphalt- and Roof Membrane Works in old groundwood mill premises. While there was demand for such products, the company fell into trouble due to Törngren's optimistic business decisions, and he sold it later.

Törngren's son Adolf Törngren Jr. became a notable politician.

== Nuutajärvi glassworks ==
Törngren studied jurisprudence and graduated as jurist in 1845. He got title of varatuomari in 1848. He was his parents' only child who survived after them, and he inherited a large property. Following to death of his mother Eva Agatha in 1849, he inherited Nuutajärvi mansion and started developing it by draining wetlands, acquired Ayrshire cattle and engaged in forestry. The mansion area included also Nuutajärvi glassworks which was at the beginning leased to another operator, but in 1851 Törngren started took lead of the factory. He invested on two new furnaces, grinding shop and porcelain shop, and started pressed glass production first in Finland.

Törngren recruited skilled workforce from abroad to run Nuutajärvi glassworks. One of them was Prussian-born bookkeeper Georg Franz Stockmann, who run Törngren's glassware shop in Helsinki and later developed his own business from it.

== Beginning of Tampereen Pellava- ja Rauta-Teollisuus ==
In 1856 Törngren bought an area by lower rapids of Tammerkoski in Messukylä and got permissions for silk and linen manufacturing. As there was no industrial linen production in Finland, it is not known how Törngren got this business idea, but speculatively the initiator was Törngren's wife Sofia. Raw material was widely available, as flax growing was common in Tavastia. However, the factory plan was postponed due to complaints. Törngren met his old friend Gustaf Wasastjerna, who had bought a nearby lot of an old ironworks at other side of the rapids in Tampere and planned to convert it into engineering works. The men decided to start business with joined forces, and Törngren applied for moving the location of his industrial rights to the other side of the river. A five-storey linen factory building was finished already in 1858 and taken into use in the following spring. Törngren's linen mill and Wasastjerna's engineering works were merged in 1861 as Tammerfors Linne- & Jern-Manufaktur Aktie-Bolag ("Tampere Linen and Iron Industry Ltd") but kept as separate business units. By the merger the men aimed to attract investors, but eventually they did not manage at gaining more capital because limited company concept was new in Finland, and Törngren and Wasastjerna finally owned 95% of the shares. The business developed favourably and in 1862 the linen mill was with its 755 workers the second biggest factory of Finland after the nearby Finlayson cotton mill.

During 1856–1859 Törngren additionally operated small glassworks in Tourula, Yläne. After Törngren's father, Johan Agapetus Törngren died in 1859, he again leased out the Nuutajärvi glassworks and moved to Laukko in Vesilahti, where he could manage his business in Tampere.

== Jokioinen baize factory ==
Törngren had invested a large sum on Jokioinen baize factory which moved its production to Tampere. When the company bankrupted in 1863, Törngren lost a large part of his property. The prevailing famine further weakened Törngren's affairs.

== Helsingfors Skeppsdocka ==
Törngren left in Helsinki magistrate on 2 August 1864 an application for starting a shipyard and engineering works in Hietalahti. He applied for the premises an area which consisted of 12,200 m^{2} land and 9,500 m^{2} water. After an assent of the city elders, Uusimaa Province governor and Senate Manufacturing Board, he was granted the permission for the business on 4 March 1865. Törngren appointed engineer Lieutenant Fridolin Stjernvall to make plans for the yard layout and the construction project was led by engineer Theodor Tallqvist.

Törngren got run out of cash in 1866 and the construction project was halted. By then the costs had reached to 200,000 marks. Törngren made an arrangement in which the company ownership was transferred to Tampere Linen and Iron Industry to which he owed 435,000 marks. The work was continued under the same leadership after the transaction. The management of Tampere Linen and Iron Industry presumably planned selling the yard soon after the construction work was to be finished, but the yard required further large sums of money before becoming operative. The yard was finally sold in 1880 with significant losses.

== Bankruptcy ==
The large investments on the shipyard together with the Finnish monetary reform had caused Törngren running out of cash reserves in 1866. Nuutajärvi glassworks and Laukko mansion were sold in an auction and Törngren settled in Helsinki, where he ran a forwarding agency.

== Roof membrane business ==
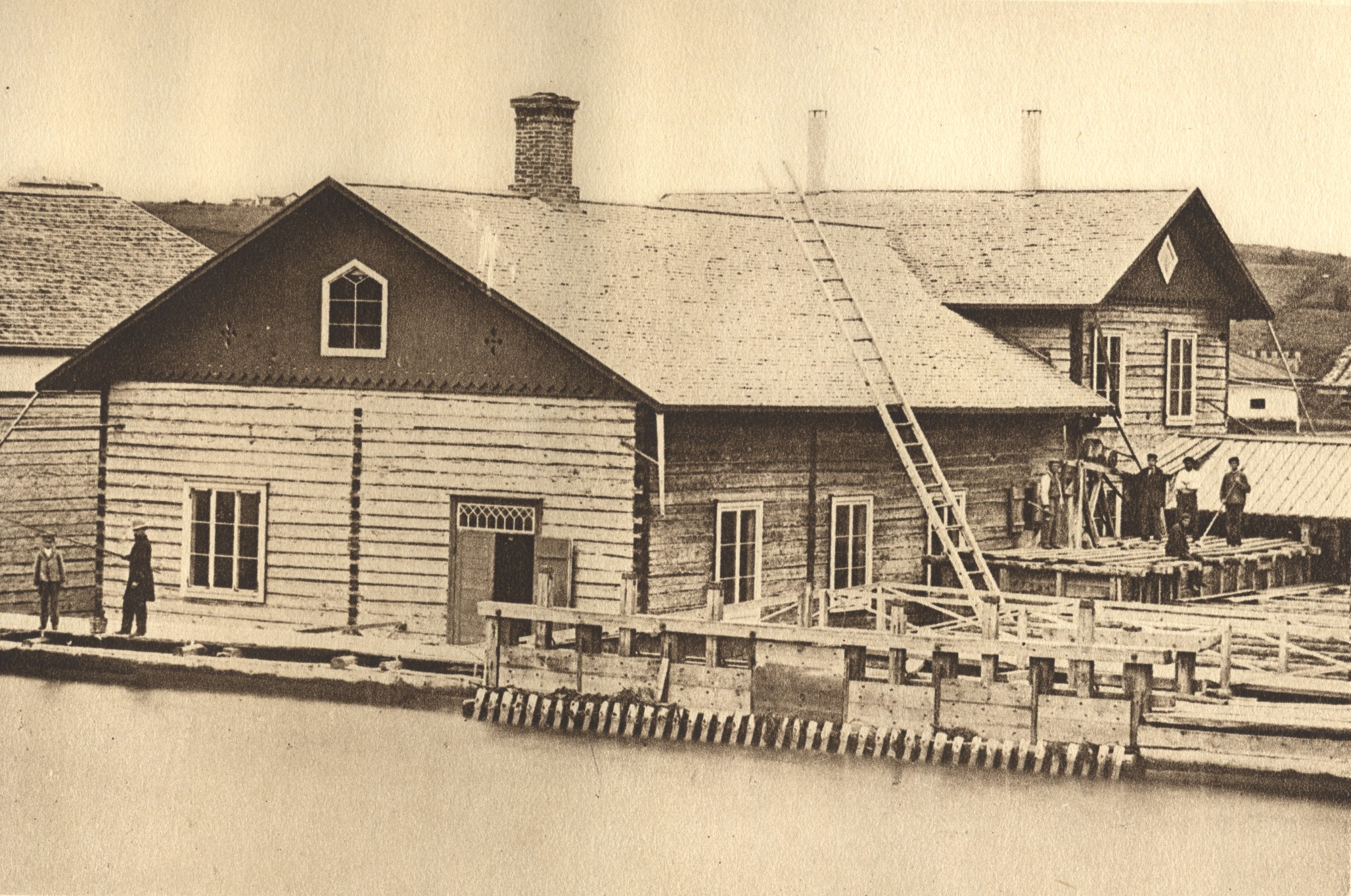
Tampere groundwood mill in the 1870s.

After Törngren had decided to start business with Wasastjerna, he had sold the lot at Tammerkoski. His wife's younger brother Fredrik Idestam had built there a groundwood mill, which he later moved to Nokia. In 1877 Törngren founded company Tampereen Asfaltti- ja Kattohuopatehdas Oy ("Tampere Asphalt- and Roof Membrane Works") that bought the old factory and converted it for asphalt membrane production. Due to new fire protection regulations, the material had high demand and it was applied on roofs in urban areas and railway stations. Törngren grew the business aggressively, and once again fell into financial troubles. He sold the business and moved to Pirkkala, where he developed grain drying concepts, which were granted a patent.

== Political career ==
Törngren took part in a Finnish industrial development planning committee, installed by the Senate of Finland in summer 1856. In 1862 Törngren became selected to so-called January Committee by Nobility. During Diet of Finland 1863–1864, he represented his family as member of Estate of Nobles. He had liberal views, and he supported development of railway network. Törngren initiated installing Supreme Court; his proposal was approved, but implemented much later, after the Finnish Declaration of Independence.

== Personal life ==
Törngren was married in 1849 to daughter of Bergmeister Gustaf Idestam, Sofia Charlotta (1830–1913). Their son Adolf Törngren Jr. became a notable politician. Törngren spent the last years of his life in Haapaniemi Manor, where he died in 1895.

== Sources ==
- Osakeyhtiö Hietalahden Sulkutelakka ja Konepaja – aikaisemmin Helsingfors Skeppsdocka [Hietalahti Shipyard and Engineering Works Limited – formerly Helsinki Shipyard] (in Finnish). Helsinki: Osakeyhtiö Hietalahden Sulkutelakka ja Konepaja. 1935.
