= Voima (1924 icebreaker) =

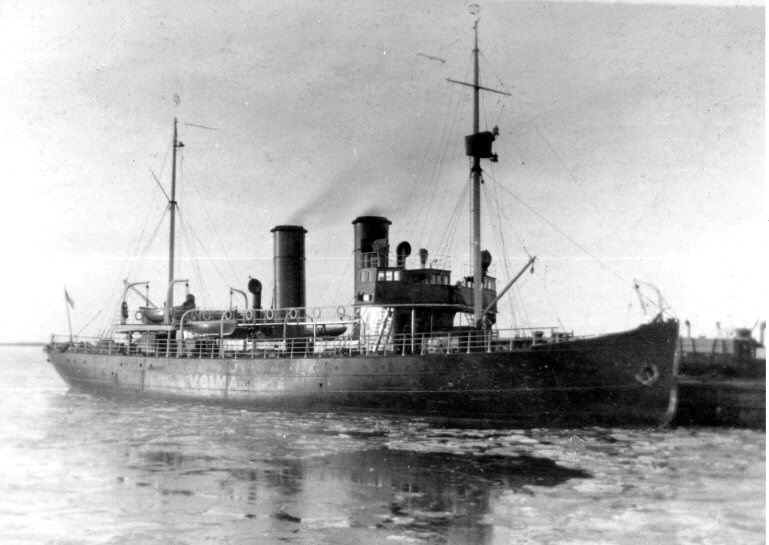

History

Finland
- Name: Shtorm, Hansa (never officially commissioned); Voima (1923–1945)
- Namesake: Finnish for "strength"
- Owner: John Nurminen & Co (1920–1923); Finnish Board of Navigation (1923–1945)
- Port of registry: Helsinki, Finland
- Builder: Werft Becker & Co., Tallinn, Estonia (1916–1918); Unidentified shipyard, Danzig, German Empire (1918–1920); Sandvikens Skeppsdocka och Mekaniska Verkstads Ab, Helsinki, Finland (1923–1924)
- Yard number: 239
- Laid down: 1916
- Launched: 25 February 1918
- Christened: 15 December 1923
- Commissioned: March 1924
- Decommissioned: 24 February 1945
- In service: 1924–1945
- Fate: Handed over to the Soviet Union

Soviet Union
- Name: Malygin (Малыгин) (1945–1971)
- Namesake: Russian Arctic explorer Stepan Malygin
- In service: 1945–1970
- Fate: Broken up in 1971

General characteristics
- Type: Icebreaker
- Tonnage: 1,510 GRT
- Displacement: 2,070 tons
- Length: 64.20 m (210.63 ft) (overall); 61.25 m (200.95 ft) (waterline)
- Beam: 14.20 m (46.59 ft) (moulded); 14.00 m (45.93 ft) (waterline)
- Draught: 4.4 m (14 ft) (bow); 5.1 m (17 ft) (stern); 5.9 m (19 ft) (max)
- Boilers: Four coal-fired boilers with mechanical ventilation
- Engines: Two triple-expansion steam engines, 2,500 ihp (1,900 kW) (stern) and 1,000 ihp (750 kW) (bow)
- Propulsion: Bow and stern propellers
- Speed: 13 knots (24 km/h; 15 mph) in open water
- Crew: 44
- Armament: Armed during the Second World War

Voima was a Finnish and later Soviet steam-powered icebreaker. Laid down at Werft Becker & Co. in Tallinn in 1916 and fitted with engines in Danzig in 1918, the unfinished icebreaker was towed to Helsinki in 1920 and completed by Sandvikens Skeppsdocka och Mekaniska Verkstads Ab in 1923–1924. After two decades of successful service Voima was handed over to the Soviet Union as war reparation in 1945 and renamed Malygin (Малыгин). She remained in service until 1970 and was broken up in 1971.

Voima was the first state-owned icebreaker acquired by the independent Finland. She can also be considered as the first state-owned icebreaker designed by Finnish naval architects and delivered by a Finnish shipyard.

== History ==
=== Background and construction ===
When Finland signed the Treaty of Tartu on 14 October 1920, it agreed to return the Russian icebreakers that the Finnish White Guard had seized during the Civil War in 1918. As a result, the Wäinämöinen, the largest and most powerful state-owned icebreaker of Finland at that time, was handed over to Estonia and the smaller Ilmarinen to the Soviet Union in 1922. While Finland got the Avance back in return, there was a definite need for a powerful icebreaker — both the size of the ships calling the Finnish winter ports and the amount of exported goods, especially forest products, had increased considerably since the First World War. When the forest industry owners voiced their concerns, the Finnish shipowner John Nurminen stepped in and offered the state an unfinished icebreaker he had purchased from Germany two years earlier.

The partially completed icebreaker he was offering was one of the two icebreakers ordered by the Russian Baltic Fleet from Werft Becker & Co. in Tallinn, Estonia, in 1916. Laid down as Shtorm, the icebreaker was intended not only for escort operations on the Baltic Sea, but also naval tasks such as laying mines during the winter months and transporting troops and supplies to Russian warships and coastal forts. The construction proceeded slowly during the war and in 1918, shortly after the ship had been launched, the unfinished icebreaker was captured by Germans and towed to Danzig, where she was fitted with boilers. However, the German Revolution of 1918–1919 stopped the construction of the ship, now known as Hansa, shortly afterwards. Nurminen bought the unfinished icebreaker in 1920 and had her towed to Helsinki.

When Nurminen began offering Hansa to the state of Finland, he faced severe opposition even though he even offered to accept the old and, to some people, outdated icebreaker Murtaja as part of the payment. Her rusted hull was seen as a pile of scrap, not worth the government's scarce funds, and she didn't even have a bow propeller which was seen as a crucial component of a modern icebreaker. However, several maritime professionals saw her potential and the owner of Götaverken, Hugo Hammar, even said that once finished, Hansa would outperform the largest icebreakers of Finland at that time, Sampo and Tarmo. As a result, the Finnish Board of Navigation reserved FIM 17 million for the purchase and completion of Hansa.

The rebuilding of Hansa was awarded to Sandvikens Skeppsdocka och Mekaniska Verkstads Ab in Helsinki and the work began in late spring 1923. During the ten months the icebreaker spent in the shipyard she received a new bow with a bow propeller and two German steam engines with an official combined maximum output of 4,100 indicated horsepower (3,100 kW), making her the most powerful Finnish icebreaker at that time. On 15 December 1923 she was given the name Voima, meaning "strength" in Finnish, and during the first sea trials on 6 March 1924 she turned out to be an excellent icebreaker that left a broad ice-free channel behind her. Voima had also cost considerably less than a new icebreaker with similar characteristics and performance.

=== Career ===
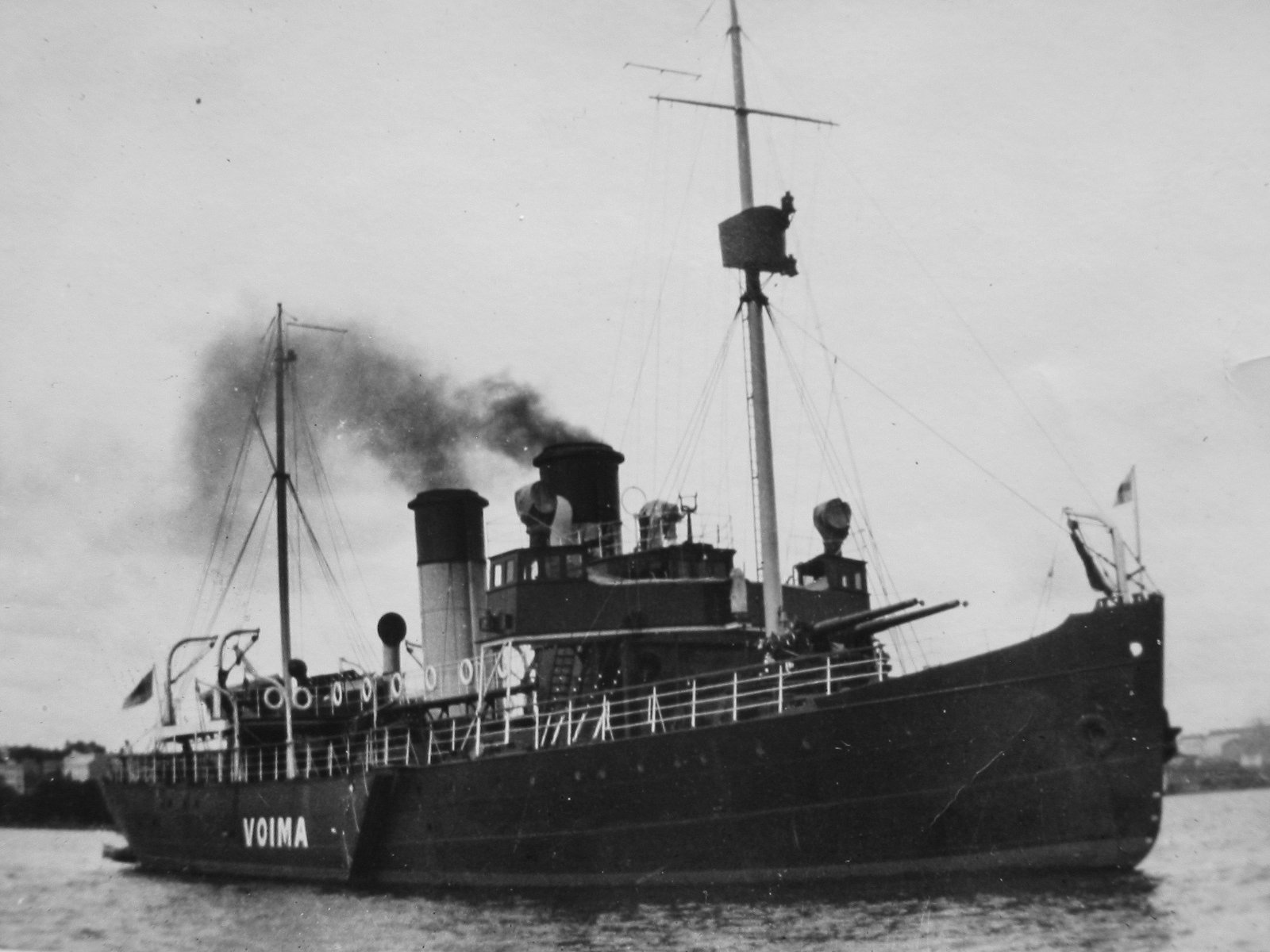
Voima was fitted with 120 mm Pattern 1905 deck guns before the Second World War

Commissioned in March 1924, Voima was usually sent to the Gulf of Bothnia where she assisted ships to the port of Vaasa until late December. As the ice conditions got worse, she moved south until, from February on, she was tasked to maintain an open channel between Finland and Sweden on the Turku-Stockholm route.

In 1927, after the loss of the Finnish torpedo boat S2, Voima was used as a gunnery training ship by the Finnish Navy. As a result, she already had deck gun mounts when the Winter War began on 30 November 1939 and the icebreakers were armed against Soviet fighters. During the war Voima assisted ships in the Bothnian Sea and stayed outside major conflicts.

When the Moscow Armistice was signed on 19 September 1944, Finland was ordered to pay war reparations to the Soviet Union. One of the first payments included the newest and most powerful state-owned steam-powered icebreakers. Voima was handed over along with the enormous Jääkarhu on 24 February 1945. She was renamed Malygin (Малыгин), becoming the second Soviet icebreaker named after the Russian 18th century arctic explorer Stepan Malygin. The old Malygin, built in 1912, had been lost in a storm near Kamchatka in 1940. In 1950 she was modernized and her boilers were converted to oil. The name Voima was later given to the first Finnish post-war icebreaker.

Malygin remained in service until 1970. She was broken up in the following year.

== Technical details ==
Voima was 64.20 metres (210.63 ft) long overall and 61.25 metres (200.95 ft) at the waterline. Her moulded breadth was 14.20 metres (46.59 ft) and breadth at the waterline slightly smaller, 14.00 metres (45.93 ft). To improve her icebreaking characteristics Voima was built with considerable stern trim, meaning that her draft was greater in the stern than in the bow. When operating at a normal displacement of 2,070 tons, her bow draft was 4.4 metres (14.44 ft) and stern draft 5.1 metres (16.73 ft), but the latter could be increased up to 5.9 metres (19.36 ft) in case of difficult ice conditions. Voima had a crew of 44.

The hull of Voima, designed by Finnish naval architect K. Albin Johansson, was based on Finnish icebreakers Sampo and Tarmo, and the Russian icebreaker Pyotr Velikiy — her hull form and main dimensions were interpolated from the three older icebreakers. While initially designed without a bow propeller, her bow was later completely rebuilt with one. The angle of the stem, the first part of the icebreaker to encounter ice and bend it under the weight of the ship, was 26 degrees.

Voima was powered by two coal-fired triple-expansion steam engines manufactured by Vulcan-Werke Hamburg und Stettin AG, one driving a propeller in the stern and the other a second propeller in the bow to reduce friction between the hull and the ice. The stern engine was rated at 2,500 ihp at 95 rpm and the bow engine 1,000 ihp at 140 rpm, but during backing and ramming the engines could produce 2,800–3,100 ihp and 1,200–1,300 ihp, respectively, for a brief period of time. Her speed in open water was 13 knots (24 km/h; 15 mph). The four coal-fired mechanically ventilated main boilers, installed on the icebreaker in 1918 in Danzig, had been manufactured by Blohm & Voss in 1899 and originally intended for German armored frigate SMS Friedrich der Grosse. In addition Voima had a smaller auxiliary boiler, manufactured by Vulcan in Turku. Her fuel stores could hold 380 tons of coal that was fed to the fireboxes at a rate of 2.4–3.3 tons per hour depending on operating conditions.

Equipped for escort icebreaker duties, Voima had a steam-powered towing winch, a cable and a stern notch. In difficult ice conditions the ship being assisted was taken into tow, and in extremely difficult compressive ice it was pulled to the icebreaker's stern notch. For salvage operations Voima had a powerful centrifugal pump capable of pumping 1,000 tons of water per hour.

== Bibliography ==
- Kaukiainen, Yrjö (1992). Navigare Necesse – Merenkulkulaitos 1917–1992. Jyväskylä: Gummerus Kirjapaino Oy. ISBN 951-47-6776-4.
- Laurell, Seppo (1992). Höyrymurtajien aika. Jyväskylä: Gummerus Kirjapaino Oy. ISBN 951-47-6775-6.
- Ramsay, Henrik (1949). Jääsaarron murtajat. Helsinki: Werner Söderström Osakeyhtiö (WSOY).
