= List of ships built at Hietalahti shipyard =

The list of ships built at Hietalahti shipyard in Helsinki, Finland, is divided into three parts:

- List of ships built at Hietalahti shipyard (1–200)
- List of ships built at Hietalahti shipyard (201–400)
- List of ships built at Hietalahti shipyard (401 onwards)
