= List of ships built at Hietalahti shipyard (201–400) =

This is the list of ships built at Hietalahti shipyard in Helsinki, Finland, from yard number 201 until 400.

Ship name(s) (Note: The romanization of Russian names may not be consistent.)	Year	Type (as built)	Yard number	IMO number	Status	Notes	Image	Ref
Kamenka	1912	Tugboat	201					
Pernau	1913	Tugboat	202					
Sommarö II (1913–19??); Norden (19??–??)	1913	Passenger ship	203					
HKR-8-H.S.B.	1913	Hopper barge	204					
HKR-9-H.S.B.	1913	Hopper barge	205					
Soldat (1914–1918); Pelastaja I, Sotilas (1918–1922); Moroz (1922–1923); Ljod (1923–??)	1914	Tugboat	206			Soldat was a Russian icebreaking tugboat that served at Peter the Great's Naval Fortress in Tallinn, Estonia. She was captured by Finnish troops in Hanko in 1918, renamed Pelastaja I and later Sotilas, and handed over to the Finnish National Board of Navigation. The vessel was returned to Russia in 1922 and renamed first Moroz and later Ljod.		
Matros (1914–1918); Madrus (1918–1941)	1914	Tugboat	207		Lost	Matros was a Russian icebreaking tugboat, probably a sister ship to Soldat, that the Russians left behind in Estonia in 1918. She was later incorporated to the Estonian Navy and her name was translated to Madrus. When the Soviet Union occupied Estonia in 1940, Madrus was transferred to the port of Tallinn where she served as a harbour tugboat until World War II. Madrus was scuttled outside the port of Tallinn on 28 August 1941 to prevent her from being captured by the German forces.		
Kaspij	1914	Tugboat	208					
Zarnitsa (1914–1921); Zmei (1921–1941)	1914	Tugboat	209		Lost	Zarnitsa was used as a minesweeper during and after the First World War. She was sunk by a mine on the coast of Estonia on 30 July 1941.		
Artillerist (1914–1922); Sneg (1922–1941)	1914	Tugboat	210		Lost	Artillerist was initially built for the Imperial Russian Navy but transferred to civilian service in 1921 and renamed Sneg in 1922. In 1926, she was moved to the Black Sea in 1926. She was sunk by a mine near Tendrovskaya Kosa on 15 August 1941.		
Termenik	1914	Tender	211					
Perevojnja	1914	Tender	212					
Stretscha	1914	Tender	213					
Dobrinia	1914	Tugboat	214					
Alexander Newski			215					
Sunkist (1919–1924); Njord (1924–1935); Pioner I (1935–1937); Dido (1937–1939)	1919	Cargo ship	216		Lost	Capsized in the North Sea on 7 January 1939 while carrying a cargo of Barley from Odense, Denmark, to Lossiemouth, Scotland.		
Koptjik	1916	Minesweeper	217			Built for the Imperial Russian Navy		
Korchun	1916	Minesweeper	218			Built for the Imperial Russian Navy.		
	1914	Barge	219–224			Unnamed heating barges.		
Strizh (as ordered); Fritiof; Colo Colo (–1930); Toqui (1930–1944)	1918	Patrol boat	225		Lost	Strizh and Tchibis (see below) were patrol boats ordered for the Imperial Russian Navy, but due to the Russian Revolution the vessels were never delivered to the original customer. The ships were sold to German interest together with two other ships of similar design and briefly registered under Norwegian flag as well as given Norwegian names. The German owner sold the four vessels to the Chilean Navy. The ships arrived in Chile in October 1920 after having been converted to minelayers at J. Samuel White shipyard in the United Kingdom. Colo Colo was sold and renamed Toqui in 1930. She sank in a storm on 25 February 1944 off Huasco. The wreck was broken up in 1957.		
Tchibis (as ordered); Norge; Leucotón (–1950)	1918	Patrol boat	226		Broken up			
Dockan	1915	Tugboat	227					
		Barge	228			Unnamed wooden barge.		
Rigel	1920	Cargo ship	230		Lost	Foundered in ice 10 nautical miles (19 km; 12 mi) off Mariehamn, Åland, on 7 March 1923.		
Suomen Poika (1919–1945); Pioner (1945–1949)	1921	Cargo ship	231		Lost	Suomen Poika was stopped by U-41 while en route to Great Britain and escorted to Cuxhaven for unloading. Handed over to the Soviet Union as war reparations in 1945 and renamed Pioner. She is believed to have been lost in 1949.		
Suomen Neito (1922–1963)	1922	Cargo ship	232		Broken up	Broken up in Teijo, Finland, in 1963.		
Kymi	1920	Tugboat	233			Four small tugboats (Kymi, Apu, Kumpu and Keikari) for handling logs during floating.		
Apu	1920	Tugboat	234					
Haapa	1918	Barge	235					
Kumpu	1920	Tugboat	236					
Keikari	1920	Tugboat	237					
Styrbjörn	1922	Tugboat	238		In service	Sold to Sweden in 1932 and re-engined in 1954. Currently in private ownership.		
Voima (1924–1945); Malygin (1945–1971)	1924	Icebreaker	239		Broken up	Voima was the first Finnish state-owned icebreaker delivered by a Finnish shipyard. She was handed over to the Soviet Union as war reparations and renamed Malygin. She was decommissioned in 1970 and broken up in the following year.		
Turja (1928–1986); Petsamo (1986–present)	1928	Patrol boat	240		In service	Turja, a 65-ton patrol boat for the Finnish Border Guard, was stationed in Liinahamari until the Winter War. Burned and scuttled on 3 December 1939 before the arrival of the Soviet troops, but repaired and returned to service after the war. Decommissioned in 1976 and sold to private owner as a pleasure craft. Sold to Sweden in 1993 and rebuilt as a passenger ship.		
Saukko	1930	Submarine	241		Broken up	In service in the Finnish Navy before and during World War II, Saukko was one of the smallest submarines in the world with a displacement of around 100 tonnes. Saukko, the only submarine of her kind, participated in both the Winter War and the Continuation War. After the Paris Peace Treaty forbade Finland from possessing submarines, Saukko was decommissioned and sold for scrap in 1953.		
HKR-23-H.S.B.	1930	Hopper barge	242					
HKR-24-H.S.B.	1931	Hopper barge	243					
Nordvast	1932	Motorboat	244					
Vind	1932	Motorboat	245					
Irtysch	1932	Motorboat	246					
Jenissej	1932	Motorboat	247					
Lena	1932	Motorboat	248					
	1932	Motorboat	249–254			Unknown motorboats.		
Baikal	1932	Motorboat	255					
Exportles No 28	1932	Lifeboat	256					
Exportles No 28	1932	Lifeboat	256					
Exportles No 30	1932	Lifeboat	257					
Exportles No 29	1932	Lifeboat	258					
Exportles No 31	1932	Lifeboat	259					
Kama	1932	Lifeboat	260					
Oka	1932	Lifeboat	261					
Dvina	1932	Motorboat	262					
Wolga	1932	Motorboat	263					
Dnjepr	1932	Motorboat	264					
Neva	1932	Motorboat	265					
Don	1932	Motorboat	266					
Jäämeri (1933–1939)	1933	Passenger ship	267		Lost	Jäämeri, a passenger ship operated by the Finnish Board of Navigation, was stationed in Petsamo. She was burned and scuttled before the arrival of the Soviet troops on 3 December 1939.		
Orion (1935–1945); Valday (1945–1969)	1935	Cargo ship	268	5375486	Broken up	Orion was handed over to the Soviet Union as war reparations in 1945 and renamed Valday. Broken up in Osaka in 1969.		
	1914	Barge	269–270			Unnamed barges		
Otso	1936	Icebreaker	271	5608373	Broken up	Otso was a steam-powered port icebreaker operated by the Port of Helsinki. Reportedly broken up in the late 1970s.		
Sisu (1939–1975); Louhi (1975–1986)	1939	Icebreaker	272	5330371	Broken up	Sisu was the first diesel-electric icebreaker in Finland. She was decommissioned, transferred to the Finnish Navy in 1975 and renamed Louhi. In 1986, she was broken up in Naantali, Finland.		
Aldebaran (1938–1967); Antonios (1967–1972)	1938	Cargo ship	273	5009491	Broken up	Built for the Finland Steamship Company. Broken up in Haliç, Turkey, in 1972.		
Turku (1938–1980); Hamina (1980–1986); Ukkopekka (1986–present)	1938	Fairway vessel	274	6610132	In service	Ukkopekka, a former fairway inspection vessel that was converted into a passenger ship in the 1980s, is the last ship that participated in both the Winter War and the Continuation War that is still in active service.		
HKR.25	1938	Water barge	275					
HKR.26	1938	Barge	276					
Olympia (1939–1945); Petrodvorets (1945–1949); Turgenev (1949–1992)	1939	Passenger ship	277		Broken up	Transferred to the Soviet Union in 1945. Re-engined with a diesel engine in 1957. Decommissioned around 1991.		
	1939	Hopper barge	278			Unnamed hopper barge.		
	1939	Water barge	279			Unnamed water barge.		
Reval		Tugboat	282					
Ostland (1941–1948); Jambo (1948–1968)	1941	Tugboat	283	5516853	Broken up			
Ortrud		Tugboat	284					
Pernau		Tugboat	285					
Korsfjord (1942–1943); NT.47 (1943–1948); Corsar (1948–1951); Azad (1951–1969)	1942	Tugboat	286	5032137	Broken up	Broken up Bombay, India.		
Ostpreussen		Tugboat	287					
Windau		Tugboat	288					
Goldingen (1942–1945); Excluder (1945–1952); Lenadil (1952–1955); Sand Tug (1955–1966)	1942	Tugboat	289	5310735	Broken up	Handed over to the Soviet Union as war reparations in 1945. Foundered in Madras, India, during scrapping in 1966.		
Capella (1943–1945); Vishera (1945-late 1940s)	1943	Cargo ship	290	5615134	Lost	Built for the Finland Steamship Company in 1943 and handed over to the Soviet Union as war reparations in 1945. Believed to have been mined in the Gulf of Riga in the late 1940s.		
Clio (1944–1965)	1944	Cargo ship	291	5507609	Broken up	Built for the Finland Steamship Company in 1944. Broken up in Bruges, Belgium, in 1965.		
Fennia (1944–1965)	1944	Cargo ship	292	5511368	Broken up	Built for the Finland Steamship Company in 1944. Broken up in Bruges, Belgium, in 1965.		
Bjarmia (1944–1945); Zoya Kosmodemyanskaya (1945–1972)	1944	Cargo ship	293	5399107	Broken up	Built for the Finland Steamship Company but handed over to the Soviet Union as part of the war reparations in 1945 and broken up there in 1972.		
Msta (1945–1971); Zutis (1971–1975)	1945	Cargo ship	294	5243231	Broken up	Handed over to the Soviet Union as part of the war reparations in 1945. Renamed Zutis in 1971 and hulked in Latvia in 1975. According to some reports, the hull was not broken up until the 1990s.		
Capella (1945–1965)	1945	Cargo ship	295	5506209	Broken up			
Turso (1944–1945); Taifun (1945–2004); Turso (2004–present)	1944	Tugboat	298		Museum ship	Turso was delivered to the Port of Helsinki in 1944. However, in 1945 she was handed over to the Soviet Union as part of the war reparations and renamed Taifun. The tugboat was stationed in Leningrad (later St. Petersburg), where she assisted ships and broke ice dams in the Neva River for more than five decades. In the early 2000s, a group of Finnish enthusiastics and businessmen, including Aatos Erkko, purchased the last remaining war reparations vessel and brought her back to Finland. The ship, still largely in original condition, was given back her old name and she has been undergoing extensive restoration for years. In 2011, Turso visited St. Petersburg under her own steam.		
Moguchiy (1945–1970s)	1945	Tugboat	299	6856982	Broken up	One of twenty steam-powered tugboats similar to Turso, delivered as Finnish war reparations to the Soviet Union. Reportedly broken up by 1976.		
Nadyozhnyi (1945–1974)	1945	Tugboat	300	6857405	Broken up			
Moguchiy II (1945–1992); Moguchiy (1992–present)	1945	Tugboat	301	6856970	In service	Reportedly used as non-self-propelled steam supply ship		
Silatch	1946	Tugboat	302		Broken up			
Borets (1946–1970)	1946	Tugboat	303		Broken up			
БП-304; F-5	1947	Tugboat	304					
Pluton (1947–1960s)	1947	Tugboat	305	6858772	Broken up			
Bystryi (1947–1960s)	1947	Tugboat	306		Broken up			
Pomor (1947–1960s)	1947	Tugboat	307	6858928	Broken up			
Zyryanin (1947–1974)	1948	Tugboat	308		Broken up			
Nenets (1948–1970s)	1948	Tugboat	309	6857534	Broken up			
Eskimos (1948–1970)	1948	Tugboat	310	6801652	Broken up			
Krasnodarets (1948–1980)	1948	Tugboat	311	6855641	Broken up			
Chakva (1948–1960s)	1948	Tugboat	312		Broken up			
Pereval (1949–1973)	1949	Tugboat	313	6858617	Broken up			
Azovets (1949–1982)	1949	Tugboat	314	6850299	Broken up			
Michurinets (1950–1971)	1950	Tugboat	315	6856968	Broken up			
Buran (1951–1970s)	1951	Tugboat	315	6852883	Broken up			
Vikhr (1951–1970s)	1951	Tugboat	317		Broken up			
Vikhr (1952–1970s)	1952	Tugboat	318	6853318	Broken up			
Metallurg		Barge	319					
		Barge	320					
Gornyak		Barge	321			Converted to a floating processing plant for underwater mining operation at Vankina Bay where it remains as a wreck.		
Lichter 3	1947	Barge	322					
Lichter 4	1947	Barge	323					
Lichter 5	1948	Barge	324					
Lichter 6	1948	Barge	325					
Lichter 7	1949	Barge	326					
Lichter 8	1949	Barge	327					
Taman	1949	Barge	328		Broken up			
	1949–1953	Barge	329–337			Unknown barges.		
Neva	1949	Barge	338					
	1950–1953	Barge	339–343			Unknown barges.		
Turso	1950	Tugboat	344	7829857	Broken up		Broken up in 2015.	
Rigel (1950–1971); Findex (1971)	1950	Cargo ship	345	5294888	Lost	Sank in the Mediterranean Sea (36.43 N 15.22 E) on 25 March 1971 while carrying a cargo of dried fruit from Giresun, Turkey, to Hamburg, Germany.		
Voima	1954	Icebreaker	349	5383158	In service	Voima, completed in 1954 and extensively rebuilt in 1978–1979, is the world's oldest large icebreaker in active service. She underwent a ten-year service life extension in 2016.		
Kapitan Belousov	1954	Icebreaker	353	5181598	In service	When Voima, the first Finnish post-war icebreaker and the first icebreaker with two bow propellers, generated widespread publicity to Wärtsilä, the Soviet Union ordered three icebreakers of similar design, Kapitan Belousov, Kapitan Voronin and Kapitan Mehelov. In addition, the Swedish Maritime Administration ordered a fourth similar vessel, Oden. Kapitan Belousov, which has not been extensively modernized, was sold to Ukraine in 1991 and remains in active service.		
Kapitan Voronin	1955	Icebreaker	354	5181689	Broken up	Broken up in Alang, India, in 1996.		
Kapitan Meheklov	1956	Icebreaker	355	5181639	Broken up	Broken up in Alang, India, in 1994.		
Potiets (1953–1969); Admiral Kornilov (1969–1979)	1953	Tugboat	356	5283243	Broken up			
Zorkiy (1953–1996)	1953	Tugboat	357	5334559	Broken up			
BP-358 (1954–1968); Vedushchiy (1968–1990)	1954	Tugboat	358	6852687	Broken up			
BP-359	1954	Tugboat	359					
Riga	1955	Tugboat	360	5294852	Broken up	Deleted from registry in the 1970s.		
Kichinev	1955	Tugboat	361	5189289	Broken up	Deleted from registry in the 1970s.		
Oden (1957–1988); Odena (1988)	1957	Icebreaker	362	5260916	Broken up	Broken up in Alang, India, in 1988.		
	1952	Barge	363			Unnamed oil barge		
Karhu (1958–1988); Kapitan Chubakov (1988–1992); Karu (1992–2020)	1958	Icebreaker	364	5182205	Broken up			
Moskva	1960	Icebreaker	365	5242495	Broken up	Moskva, Leningrad, Kiev, Murmansk and Vladivostok were a series of five polar icebreakers for the Soviet Union. Moskva was broken up in 1992.		
Leningrad	1961	Icebreaker	366	5206104	Broken up	Broken up in Alang, India, in 1993.		
Murtaja	1959	Icebreaker	367	5244132	Broken up	Broken up in Naantali, Finland, in 1986.		
Sampo	1961	Icebreaker	368	5308938	In service	After decommissioning in 1987, Sampo was purchased by the city of Kemi for tourist cruises in the Gulf of Bothnia. The bow propellers were removed in the late 1980s.		
Skandia (1961–1974); Isla de Cubagua (1974–1986)	1961	Ro-pax ferry	369	5330955	Lost	Foundered at 32°39′N 29°09′W while being towed from Puerto la Cruz, Venezuela, to Piraeus, Greece, on 14 April 1986.		
Nordia (1962–1974); Isla de Coche (1974–1986); Theoskepasti (1986–1987)	1962	Ro-pax ferry	370	5255351	Broken up	Damaged by fire on 24 October 1987 during repairs. Broken up in 1988.		
Ingul	1962	Cable layer	371	5161495	Broken up	Ingul and Yana were two of the eight Klazma-class large cable layers built for the Soviet Navy in Finland. Ingul was decommissioned in 1996.		
Yana	1963	Cable layer	372	5169710	Decommissioned	Decommissioned in 2009.		
Tarmo	1963	Icebreaker	373	5352886	In service			
Tor	1964	Icebreaker	374	5418197	In service			
Ilmatar (1964–1984); Viking Princess (1984–1997); Palm Beach Princess (1997–2011)	1964	Ro-pax ferry	375	6402937	Broken up	Built as a passenger- and car ferry for the Finland–Sweden service, Ilmatar was found out to be too small from the start and was subsequently lengthened at HDW Hamburg shipyard in Germany by 20 metres (66 ft). In addition to increasing passenger and car capacity, she was fitted with two additional main engines and two new propeller shafts. In 1978–1979, she was rebuilt for cruise service in Helsinki, Finland. In 2011, the vessel was sold for scrapping in the Dominican Republic.		
Kiev	1965	Icebreaker	376	6424040	Broken up	Broken up in Alang, India, in 1993.		
Finnhansa (1966–1978); Prinsessan (1978–1987); Princesa Marissa (1987–2008); Prince (2008)	1966	Ro-pax ferry	377	6509371	Broken up	Finnhansa and Finnpartner, owned by Merivienti Oy and operated by Finnlines, were built to serve the Finland-Germany route. In 2006, the ship was used to evacuate civilians from Lebanon. She was laid up in the same year and sold for scrapping in Alang, India, in 2008.		
Jelppari (1970–1974); Lillö (1974–2003); Tom (2003–present)	1970	Tugboat	378		In service	Superstructure rebuilt in early 2000s.		
Hanse (1966–1998); Asklipios (1998)	1966	Icebreaker	379	6603517	Lost	Damaged by fire on 25 May 1998 while underway from Helsinki, Finland, to Piraeus, Greece, to become a hospital ship. After the crew left the ship, Asklipios drifted to the shore at Kelibia, Tunisia, where she remains wrecked as of 2013. The condition of the wreck has deteriorated in recent years.		
Finnpartner (1966–1969); Sveaborg (1969–1977); Peer Gynt (1977–1978); Stena Baltica (1978–1982); Ialyssos (1982–2001); Salim (2001–2002); Noura I (2002–2004); Noura (2004)	1966	Ro-pax ferry	380	6605450	Broken up	Finnpartner was purposefully built 10 centimetres (3.9 in) shorter than her sister ship, Finnhansa, so that the latter could retain her title of "largest in the Baltic". Finnpartner was broken up in Alang, India, in 2004 as Noura.		
Turunmaa	1968	Gunboat	381		Broken up	Turunmaa-class gunboats Turunmaa (03) and Karjala (04) were in service in the Finnish Navy in 1968–2001. Since 2002, Karjala has been a museum ship in Turku, Finland, while Turunmaa was sold to private ownership and later broken up.		
Karjala	1968	Gunboat	382		Museum ship			
Finlandia (1967–1978); Finnstar (1978–1981); Innstar (1981–1982); Pearl of Scandinavia (1982–1988); Ocean Pearl (1988–1994); Pearl (1994–1995); Costa Playa (1995–1998); Oriental Pearl (1998–1999); Joy Wave (1999–2000); Golden Princess (2000–2009)	1967	Ro-pax ferry	383	6622458	Broken up	Rebuilt in 1978–1979, 1981–1982 and 1988. Broken up in China in 2009.		
Botnia (1967–1975); Ciudad de la Laguna (1975–1999); Volcan de Tenagua (1999–2007); Assalama (2007–2008)	1967	Ro-pax ferry	384	6712631	Lost	Struck a sandbar and sank in shallow water after leaving Tarfaya, Morocco, on 30 April 2008. Declared total loss. The wreck remains in place as of 2013.		
Murmansk	1968	Icebreaker	385	6723678	Broken up	Broken up in 1995.		
Vladivostok	1969	Icebreaker	386	6822876	Broken up	Broken up in 1997.		
Varma	1968	Icebreaker	387	6814245	In service			
Apu (1970–2006); Dudinka (2006–present)	1970	Icebreaker	388	6920094	In service			
Njord (1969–2000); Polar Star (2000–2017); Polar S (2017–2022)	1969	Icebreaker	389	6905745	Broken up	Njord, originally an icebreaker built for the Swedish Maritime Administration, was sold in 2000 and converted into an Arctic cruise ship in 2001. She was laid up in a shipyard in Las Palmas, Spain, 2011–2022 until towed to Aliaga, Turkey, for scrapping.		
Finncarrier (1969–1976); Polaris (1976–1984); Scandinavia (1984–1987); Scandinavia Link (1987–1990); Stena Searider (1990–1991); Searider (1991–1992); Stena Searider (1992); Norse Mersey (1992–1995); Stena Searider (1995–2007); Claudia M (2007–2014)	1969	Ro-ro ferry	390	6915881	Broken up	Lengthened in 1987. Broken up in 2014 in Aliaga, Turkey.		
Floria (1970–1975); Villa de Agaete (1975–2002); Carmen Del Mar (2002–2008)	1970	Ro-pax ferry	391	7000803	Broken up			
Song of Norway (1970–1997); Sundream (1997–2004); Dream Princess (2004–2006); Dream (2006–2007); Clipper Pearl (2007-2008); Clipper Pacific (2008-2009); Festival (2009-2010); Ocean Pearl (2010-2012); Formosa Queen (2012–2013)	1970	Cruise ship	392	7005190	Broken up	Lengthened in 1978.		
Nordic Prince (1971–1995); Carousel (1995–2005); Aquamarine (2005–2006); Arielle (2006–2008); Aquamarine (2008–2010); Ocean Star Pacific (2010–2014); Pacific (2014–2015)	1971	Cruise ship	393	7027411	Broken up	Lengthened in 1980.		
Sun Viking (1972–1998); SuperStar Sagittarius (1998); Hyundai Pongnae (1998–2001); Pongnae (2001–2003); Omar III (2003–2007); Long Jie (2007–2011); Oriental Dragon (2011–2021); Dragon (2021)	1972	Cruise ship	394	7125861	Broken up			
Royal Viking Star (1972–1991); Westward (1991–1994); Star Odyssey (1994–1996); Black Watch (1996–2022); Odin (2022)	1972	Cruise ship	395	7108930	Broken up	Lengthened in 1981.		
Royal Viking Sky (1973–1991); Sunward (1991–1992); Birka Queen (1992); Sunward (1992–1993); Golden Princess (1993–1997); SuperStar Capricorn (1997–1998); Hyundai Keumgang (1998–2001); SuperStar Capricorn (2001–2004); Grand Latino (2004–2005); Boudicca (2005–2021)	1973	Cruise ship	396	7218395	Broken up	Lengthened in 1982.		
Royal Viking Sea (1973–1991); Royal Odyssey (1991–1997); Norwegian Star (1997–2001); Norwegian Star 1 (2001–2002); Crown (2002–2004); Albatros (2004–2021); Tros (2021)	1973	Cruise ship	397	7304314	Broken up	Lengthened in 1983.		
Ermak (1974–2021)	1974	Icebreaker	398	7330038	Broken up	Ermak, Admiral Makarov and Krasin were a series of three polar icebreakers built for the Soviet Union. In September 2022, it was announced that Ermak would be dismantled to provide spare parts for Krasin.		
Admiral Makarov	1975	Icebreaker	399	7347603	In service			
Krasin	1976	Icebreaker	400	7359644	In service			

== See also ==
- List of ships built at Hietalahti shipyard (1–200)
- List of ships built at Hietalahti shipyard (401 onwards)

== Bibliography ==
Haavikko, Paavo (1984). Wärtsilä 1834–1984. Oy Wärtsilä Ab. ISBN 951-99542-0-1.
