= Big Miracle =

2012 film by Ken Kwapis

- Theatrical release poster
- Directed by: Ken Kwapis
- Screenplay by: Jack Amiel; Michael Begler
- Based on: Freeing the Whales by Tom Rose
- Produced by: Steve Golin; Michael Sugar; Tim Bevan; Liza Chasin; Eric Fellner
- Starring: Drew Barrymore; John Krasinski; Kristen Bell; Dermot Mulroney; Tim Blake Nelson; Vinessa Shaw; Ted Danson
- Cinematography: John Bailey
- Edited by: Cara Silverman
- Music by: Cliff Eidelman
- Production companies: Anonymous Content; Working Title Films
- Distributed by: Universal Pictures
- Release dates: February 3, 2012 (United States); February 10, 2012 (United Kingdom)
- Running time: 107 minutes
- Countries: United States; United Kingdom
- Language: English
- Budget: $40 million
- Box office: $24.7 million

Big Miracle, originally known as Everybody Loves Whales, is a 2012 comedy-drama film directed by Ken Kwapis. It stars Drew Barrymore and John Krasinski. The film is based on Tom Rose's 1989 book Big Miracle (originally titled Freeing the Whales), which covers Operation Breakthrough, the 1988 international effort to rescue gray whales trapped in ice near Point Barrow, Alaska.

Big Miracle was released in the United States on February 3, 2012, and in the United Kingdom on February 10 by Universal Pictures. The film received generally positive reviews from critics and grossed $24.7 million on a $40 million budget.

== Plot ==
In small town Alaska 1988, Adam Carlson, a news reporter, recruits his ex-girlfriend Rachel – a Greenpeace volunteer – on a campaign to save three gray whales trapped by rapidly forming ice in the Arctic Circle. Adam names the father Fred, the mother Wilma, and the infant Bamm-Bamm.

Drawn into the collaborative rescue work are several normally hostile factions: Inupiat whale hunters, a Greenpeace environmental activist, an oil executive, ambitious news reporters, the National Guard, the American president and politicians on the state, national, and international levels. Also joining in the effort are two entrepreneurs from Minnesota, who provide de-icing machines to help keep the hole open.

Finally an enormous Soviet ice-breaker ship arrives to remove the last barrier before the whales die. The ship's first attempt leaves only a dent. The ice is finally broken and Fred and Wilma escape the ice. Bamm-Bamm dies from injuries and does not surface again.

The epilogue, narrated by Nathan, reveals that McGraw used his new reputation to uphold a contract to clean up the Exxon Valdez oil spill, Karl and Dean's de-icers made them local celebrities, Scott and Kelly were married, Jill worked her way up to a national news network, Greenpeace membership became more prominent, Adam confesses his love for Rachel and she returns his affections and they share a kiss, Adam got to stay being a news anchor, and both Nathan and Malik became closer to one another, and Nathan recalls about the hole in which the whales were first found and quotes, "It kept getting bigger and bigger, until it let the whole world in."

== Cast ==
- John Krasinski as Adam Carlson, based on Oran Caudle who was the Director of the North Slope Borough TV Studio
- Drew Barrymore as Rachel Kramer, based on Greenpeace activist Cindy Lowry
- Ahmaogak Sweeney as Inupiat grandson Nathan to Malik
  - Sweeney also narrated the film.
- John Pingayak as Inupiat whaler Malik
- Kristen Bell as Jill Gerard, a news reporter
- Vinessa Shaw as Kelly Meyers, based on Bonnie Carroll
- Stephen Root as Gov. Haskell
- Ted Danson as J.W. McGraw
- Kathy Baker as Ruth McGraw
- Dermot Mulroney as Colonel Scott Boyer, based on General Tom Carroll
- Rob Riggle as Dean Glowacki
- Michael Gaston as Porter Beckford
- Ken Smith as Stu
- Megan Angela Smith as Sheena
- Tim Blake Nelson as Pat Lafayette
- James LeGros as Karl Hootkin
- Mark Ivanir as Dimitri
- Stefan Kapičić as Yuri
- Andrew Daly as Don Davis
- Jonathan Slavin as Roger Notch
- Gregory Jbara as General Stanton
- John Michael Higgins as Wes Handrick
- Sarah Heath as herself (archive footage)

== Production ==
Warner Bros. bought the screenplay by Jack Amiel and Michael Begler in April 2009, and in the following June, Kwapis was attached to direct. In September 2010, with Drew Barrymore and John Krasinski cast in the starring roles, filming began in Seward. It had a production budget of $30 or 40 million. The crew constructed sets in Anchorage to resemble places in Utqiagvik during the whale rescue. Filming lasted for 10 weeks. The film's working title was Everybody Loves Whales, which is a line still heard in the film. Visual effects on Big Miracle were created by Rhythm and Hues Studios and Modus FX. Burger King promoted the movie with toys. The MPAA has rated this film PG for language.

The red-and-black Soviet icebreaker in the movie is modeled after real world Arktika-class nuclear-powered icebreaker which is considerably larger than the diesel-electric icebreaker used in the actual rescue effort, the 1975-built Admiral Makarov. In shots which include live footage of the 2007-built 50 Let Pobedy, the blue-and-white polar bear logo of the former operator of the Russian nuclear icebreaker fleet, Murmansk Shipping Company, is clearly visible but the atom symbol on the hull as well as the name of the vessel has been airbrushed out.

== Reception ==
On the review aggregator Rotten Tomatoes, the film holds a rating of 74% based on reviews from 103 critics. The site's consensus was: "Big Miracle uses real-life events as the basis for a surprisingly satisfying family drama." On Metacritic, the film has a score of 61 out of 100 based on 28 critics, indicating “generally favorable” reviews.

The film grossed $2,267,385 in the US and Canada on its opening day, ranking fourth behind Chronicle, The Woman in Black, and The Grey at the box office. The film grossed $7,760,205 on its opening weekend and remained at the same spot. On its second weekend the film dropped to #8, with $3,946,050. The film closed its run on April 5, 2012, with $24,719,215 worldwide.
