= The Twilight Saga: Breaking Dawn – Part 1 =

2011 film by Bill Condon

- Theatrical release poster
- Directed by: Bill Condon
- Screenplay by: Melissa Rosenberg
- Based on: Breaking Dawn by Stephenie Meyer
- Produced by: Wyck Godfrey; Karen Rosenfelt; Stephenie Meyer
- Starring: Kristen Stewart; Robert Pattinson; Taylor Lautner; Billy Burke; Peter Facinelli; Elizabeth Reaser; Kellan Lutz; Nikki Reed; Jackson Rathbone; Ashley Greene
- Cinematography: Guillermo Navarro
- Edited by: Virginia Katz
- Music by: Carter Burwell
- Production companies: Temple Hill Entertainment; Sunswept Entertainment
- Distributed by: Summit Entertainment
- Release dates: October 30, 2011 (Rome Film Festival); November 18, 2011 (United States)
- Running time: 117 minutes
- Country: United States
- Language: English
- Budget: $127 million
- Box office: $732 million

The Twilight Saga: Breaking Dawn – Part 1 is a 2011 American romantic fantasy film directed by Bill Condon from a screenplay by Melissa Rosenberg. The first of two cinematic parts based on the 2008 novel Breaking Dawn by Stephenie Meyer, it is the sequel to The Twilight Saga: Eclipse (2010) and the fourth installment of The Twilight Saga film series. The film stars Kristen Stewart, Robert Pattinson, and Taylor Lautner, reprising their roles as Bella Swan, Edward Cullen, and Jacob Black, respectively. In the film, Bella and Edward marry and become pregnant with a half-human, half-vampire child, which causes the Cullen family to become a target of Jacob and his Wolf Pack.

Summit Entertainment announced that Breaking Dawn would be adapted into a two-part film on June 10, 2010. Principal photography for both parts began on November 1, 2010, and wrapped on April 22, 2011. The first part was shot in Rio de Janeiro, Brazil; Baton Rouge, Louisiana; and Vancouver, Canada.

The Twilight Saga: Breaking Dawn – Part 1 premiered at the Rome Film Festival on October 30, 2011, and was theatrically released in the United States on November 18, by Summit Entertainment. The film received mixed-to-negative reviews from critics; some praised the cinematography and action sequences, while others criticized the pacing, tone, CGI, screenplay and most of the performances. However, it grossed $732 million worldwide, becoming the fourth-highest-grossing film of 2011. Part 2 was released in 2012.

== Plot ==
Several months after the events of the previous film, human Bella Swan and vampire Edward Cullen are getting married. During the reception, werewolf Jacob Black, who had left town upon receiving his invitation to the wedding, returns, much to Bella's delight. They share a dance in the woods, where Bella says that she and Edward plan to consummate their marriage on their honeymoon while she is still human. Jacob becomes furious, fearing that such an act could kill her.

After the wedding, Bella and Edward travel to an island off the coast of Rio de Janeiro for their honeymoon, and they have sex for the first time. Two weeks later, Bella vomits after waking and realizes her period is late. She informs Carlisle Cullen, a medical doctor and Edward's adoptive father, that she believes she is pregnant.

Edward is distraught, as it is highly unlikely a human could survive giving birth to a vampire's baby. He encourages Bella to receive an abortion from Carlisle. She refuses and convinces Edward's sister Rosalie to be her bodyguard. The couple flies back home to Forks, Washington, where Jacob rushes to the Cullens' house to find a pale, underweight, and visibly pregnant Bella. He implores her to terminate the pregnancy immediately, but she refuses.

Jacob storms out of the Cullens' residence and meets in the woods with his packmates, including their leader Sam, who soon feels they should kill Bella to ensure her half-vampire child does not harm anyone. Jacob refuses, and he and several other werewolves separate from the pack.

As Bella's pregnancy progresses, her health declines rapidly. She soon realizes the fetus is craving blood, so she begins drinking human blood obtained by Carlisle from the hospital, improving her health. As a half-vampire, the fetus's development is far more accelerated than that of a human fetus, and thus Bella's pregnancy progresses at an alarming rate.

Edward's resentment for the baby dissolves when he discovers he can read its thoughts. When Bella suddenly goes into labor, Edward, Jacob, and Rosalie begin performing an emergency C-section while Carlisle is out obtaining blood. The procedure is excruciatingly painful, and Bella falls unconscious, though she wakes to find she has delivered a healthy daughter, whom she names Renesmee—a combination of her mother's name and Edward's mother's name.

Bella's heart suddenly stops, and Jacob desperately attempts CPR. Edward injects Bella's heart with his venom in an attempt to transform her into a vampire, but his action seems futile as Bella remains lifeless. A distraught Jacob decides to kill Renesmee for apparently causing Bella's death; however, when he looks into the baby's eyes, he "imprints" on her: a werewolf phenomenon in which one realizes one's soulmate. This prevents his pack from killing her as their most absolute law is not to harm anyone who has been imprinted on.

Over the course of two days, though still unconscious, Bella's injuries heal and her figure returns to normal. Finally, her eyes open and are blood-red, signifying that she has become a vampire.

In a post-credits scene, the Volturi, the keepers of vampire law, receive a letter from Carlisle which summarizes Bella and Edward's wedding and her transformation into a vampire. The Volturi bicker about how Carlisle is growing his coven and that the Volturis' dispute with the Cullens is over. However, their leader mentions that the Cullens still have something he wants.

== Cast ==
- Kristen Stewart as Bella Cullen (née Swan), Edward's wife, Jacob's best friend and Renesmee's mother. She marries Edward in this installment and, soon afterwards, falls pregnant with his child, eventually giving birth to a half-vampire, half-human daughter. This is the film where Bella becomes a vampire due to Edward's venom penetrating her heart and to save her life after giving birth to Renesmee.
- Robert Pattinson as Edward Cullen, Bella's vampire husband, Jacob's romantic rival and Renesmee's father. Despite his reluctance to turn her the entire series, after Bella nearly dies giving birth to their daughter, Edward is forced to transform her into a vampire to save her life after giving birth to their daughter Renesmee.
- Taylor Lautner as Jacob Black, Bella's werewolf best friend and Edward's romantic rival. He was heartbroken over Bella's choice to marry Edward, but eventually he imprints on Bella and Edward's daughter, Renesmee. He is also the great-grandson of a Chief, and the Alpha of the Black Pack.
- Billy Burke as Charlie Swan, the Chief of the Forks Police Department, and Bella's father
- Peter Facinelli as Carlisle Cullen, Esme's husband and the patriarch of the Cullen family. He is a doctor who helps Bella during her unnaturally accelerated pregnancy and provides human blood for Bella to drink to maintain her strength.
- Elizabeth Reaser as Esme Cullen, Carlisle's wife and the matriarch of the Cullen family
- Kellan Lutz as Emmett Cullen, the husband of Rosalie and the strongest member of the Cullen family until Bella's transformation into a vampire
- Nikki Reed as Rosalie Hale, a member of the Cullen family who helps Bella through her pregnancy. She is Emmett's wife.
- Jackson Rathbone as Jasper Hale, a member of the Cullen coven who can feel, control and manipulate emotions. He is Alice's husband.
- Ashley Greene as Alice Cullen, a member of the Cullen family who can see "subjective" visions of the future and who is close friends with Bella. She is Jasper's wife.
- Michael Sheen as Aro, Caius and Marcus's brother who has the ability to read every thought a person has ever had once he has made physical contact. One of the three main founders of the Volturi.
- Anna Kendrick as Jessica Stanley, one of Bella's friends from school and Mike's girlfriend
- Sarah Clarke as Renée Dwyer, Bella's mother, who remarried to Phil Dwyer
- Christian Camargo as Eleazar, a member of the Denali coven who has the ability to identify the special powers of other vampires
- Gil Birmingham as Billy Black, a Quileute elder and Jacob's physically disabled father
- Julia Jones as Leah Clearwater, Seth's older sister and the only female werewolf in existence
- Booboo Stewart as Seth Clearwater, Leah's younger brother and Edward and Jacob's friend
- Mía Maestro as Carmen, a member of the Denali coven and mate of Eleazar
- Casey LaBow as Kate, a member of the Denali coven who has the ability to release an electric current over her body
- Maggie Grace as Irina, a member of the Denali coven whose lover, Laurent, was killed by the werewolves
- MyAnna Buring as Tanya, the leader of the Denali coven
- Ty Olsson as Phil Dwyer, Renée's second husband and Bella's stepfather. Phil was previously portrayed by Matt Bushell in the first film.
- Christian Serratos as Angela Weber, one of Bella's friends from school and Eric's girlfriend
- Justin Chon as Eric Yorkie, one of Bella's friends from school and Angela's boyfriend
- Michael Welch as Mike Newton, one of Bella's friends from school and Jessica's boyfriend
- Christopher Heyerdahl as Marcus, Aro and Caius's brother who has the power to sense the strength and nature of relationships. One of the three main founders of the Volturi.
- Jamie Campbell Bower as Caius, Aro and Marcus's brother. One of the three main founders of the Volturi.
- Kiowa Gordon as Embry Call
- Tyson Houseman as Quil Ateara
- Chaske Spencer as Sam Uley, the Alpha of the main werewolf pack
- Bronson Pelletier as Jared Cameron
- Alex Meraz as Paul Lahote
- Tinsel Korey as Emily Young, Sam's imprinted fiancée whom he once hurt unintentionally
- Mackenzie Foy as Renesmee Cullen, Bella and Edward's half-mortal, half-immortal daughter and Jacob Black's imprintee
- Charlie Bewley as Demetri, a Volturi guard who is a gifted tracker
- Daniel Cudmore as Felix, a loyal servant to the Volturi who is one of their guards
- Olga Fonda as Valentina (uncredited), a secretary to the Volturi who announces Edward and Bella's wedding
- Stephenie Meyer makes an uncredited cameo as an attendee of Edward and Bella's wedding.

== Production ==
=== Development ===
In early November 2008, Summit Entertainment obtained the film adaptation rights to the remaining novels in the Twilight book series, New Moon, Eclipse, and Breaking Dawn. Talks for a Breaking Dawn film started after Summit approved The Twilight Saga: New Moon and The Twilight Saga: Eclipse, the second and third installments, respectively, in The Twilight Saga film series. Wyck Godfrey, producer of the previous films in the series, stated in mid-2009 that they had every intention to make the film version of Breaking Dawn, but Stephenie Meyer, author of the series, explained on her website's Breaking Dawn FAQ that if an adaptation were to be created, it would have to be split into two films because "[t]he book is just so long!", saying that she would have made the book shorter if it were possible. She also believed it to be impossible to make a film due to Renesmee, writing that an actress could not play her because she is a baby that has complete awareness; however, she did acknowledge the film might be possible due to the quickly-advancing technologies. Moreover, because of the mature and explicit nature of the Breaking Dawn novel, fans and critics questioned if the studio would be able to keep a PG-13 rating, noting that the movie should not be rated R for the ever-growing fan base.

I got very nervous. There were, like, 15 people. I had never really auditioned or gone into a job interview in that way since maybe 1988 or '87. I guess I was unprepared for it. […] In this case, they wanted me to talk about their project, which really needed to follow very closely the book. […] I was talking about the book, and really all I was saying was, 'OK, this is great, let's go to it.' That was the pitch. I think they're used to something else. They're used to, for those of you who might audition for film jobs, a 40-minute dissertation with perhaps visual aids and a pep talk about how fantastic this project is going to be. I just didn't know how to do that.

— Gus Van Sant

In March 2010, Variety reported that Summit Entertainment was considering splitting the 754-page book into two films, along the same lines as Warner Bros. Pictures' Harry Potter and the Deathly Hallows – Part 1 and Harry Potter and the Deathly Hallows – Part 2. Since under contract for only four films, the status of Stewart's, Pattinson's, and Lautner's contracts were in question, making the possibility of a split unlikely. Producer Wyck Godfrey stated that all three main cast members were signed onto one Breaking Dawn film. In the same month, it was reported that Summit was searching for Academy Award-nominated directors to helm the films, with names as Sofia Coppola, Gus Van Sant, and Bill Condon rumored to have been approached to direct. On April 28, 2010, Summit announced that Bill Condon would direct Breaking Dawn; Wyck Godfrey, Karen Rosenfelt, and author Stephenie Meyer would be producing the film. Condon said, "I'm very excited to get the chance to bring the climax of this saga to life on-screen. As fans of the series know, this is a one-of-a-kind book—and we're hoping to create an equally unique cinematic experience." Condon, about Summit approaching him, said, "The very nice folks at Summit… they sent me the novel. I loved it. I quickly imprinted on the material". Another reason Condon cited to work on the film was the desire to collaborate with Stewart. Gus Van Sant later explained that Robert Pattinson mentioning him as the ideal director for Breaking Dawn was what made him audition for the job and described the audition as "very nerve-wracking". However, after Condon was hired, Sant suggested that the reason behind not getting hired was his style and way of auditioning being different from what the executive producers were used to.

On June 10, 2010, Summit officially confirmed that a two-part adaptation of the fourth novel would start filming in November and made clear that all major actors would return for both parts. The first part was released on November 18, 2011, and the second part was released on November 16, 2012.

=== Pre-production ===
Since Twilight was released, fans and critics speculated whether Breaking Dawn would be adapted into a film considering the adult nature of the book. In March 2010, screenwriter Melissa Rosenberg spoke about adapting the book saying, "It's the big one, it's gonna be a big challenge, and I guarantee you that not all of the fans will be happy, and I guarantee you some of them will be. You have to give up the ideal of making everybody happy, it's just not gonna happen, but you hope you make the majority happy. Again, for that last book it is about taking that specific character Bella on her journey. It's a big journey, it's a massive change for her, and you hope to realize that." One of the scenes that aroused the speculations that the film would be rated R is the infamous graphic birth scene in the novel. In August, Rosenberg addressed such speculations saying, "On the fan site, on Facebook, all the comments are "It has to be R rated! You have to show the childbirth! Gore and guts and sex!" For me it's actually more interesting to not see it. You know, you can do childbirth without seeing childbirth … it doesn't mean it's any less evocative of an experience." Producer Wyck Godfrey addressed those speculations further saying, "it would be a crime against our audience to go R-rated" as the core fans of the series are below 18 years old, but insisted that the film is based on a mature book, so more progress and sophistication are needed. To compromise the necessary sophistication in adapting such a mature book and the need for maintaining a PG-13 rating, Rosenberg stated that the scene would be shown from Bella's point of view. Godfrey described it saying, "She is looking through the haze, experiencing pain and everything rushing around her. We only see what she sees".

You start with, and you end with, what is the emotional journey for these characters. That is the most important thing to capture, that is the only thing to capture. Everything else is up for grabs, but you must take these characters on the same emotional journey that they took in the book, and hence take the audience on the same emotional journey that they took in the book and that's the goal, you hope that you achieve that.

— Melissa Rosenberg, writer of The Twilight Saga: Breaking Dawn, about adapting the book to film

In June, Rosenberg stated in an interview that the decision on where to split the film had not been decided, as she was still in the drafting stage of the scripts. "I think it comes down to Bella as human and Bella as vampire", she said, hinting at a potential splitting point. She thought that Condon would probably disagree with the statement, explaining that the decision is ultimately up to him. Later in January 2011, Godfrey confirmed that the Part 1 will cover the wedding, honeymoon, pregnancy and birth and ends just before her transformation into a vampire as the filmmakers wanted to "take the audience through the emotional part of Bella's journey as she becomes a vampire". Part 2 will follow her transformation, the "first exhilarating moments" of her vampire life and the final confrontation with the Volturi. Godfrey also confirmed that Part 1 will follow the book's storyline as it breaks away from Bella and switches into Jacob's perspective. "There is a sense that as Bella and the Cullens (Edward's makeshift vampire clan) deal with her pregnancy, the world is still turning outside with Jacob", he explains. However, in March 2011, Meyer said in interview with USA Today that Part 1 will end when Bella opens her eyes as a vampire.

By August 2010, screenwriter Melissa Rosenberg said that the scripts for Part 1 and 2 were 75 to 85 percent completed. She found the greatest challenge in writing the scripts to be the final sequence of Part 2, explaining, "The final battle sequence is a big challenge because it lasts 25 pages. It's almost an entire three-act story in and of itself. You have to track [keep it all in one setting] hundreds of characters. It's an enormous challenge to choreograph on the page and for Bill [Condon] to choreograph on the stage." She had written various drafts of the scene but, at the time, hadn't revised or discussed them with Condon yet. She said, "That's the next big hurdle to sit down with the stunt coordinator and create the ballet. It's a lot of work. I'm exhausted, but we're intent on making them the best scripts yet." Godfrey called Part 2 "an action film in terms of life-and-death stakes" and said that in Part 1 "there are the pangs of newlywed tension that occur that are relatable even in a fantasy film. Marriage is not quite the experience that they thought it was." Condon thought of Part 1 "as a real companion piece to Catherine Hardwicke's movie". Condon explains, "Like, everything that got set up there gets resolved here. I think you'll find that there are stylistic and other nods to that film."

=== Filming ===
In order to keep the budget on both parts of Breaking Dawn reasonable, even though it is substantially greater than the previous installments in the series, much of the film was shot in and around Baton Rouge, Louisiana and Celtic Studios in Baton Rouge. Shooting in Louisiana provided larger tax credits, which a small studio like Summit Entertainment would find favorable. Summit announced in a press release on July 9, 2010, that filming was to take place in Baton Rouge, Ucluelet, and Vancouver, with the wedding being shot in Squamish and near by Pemberton, British Columbia. Both parts would be shot back-to-back as one project. The film would attempt to keep its PG-13 rating, and it would not feature any of the gruesome scenes from the novel with Kristen Stewart confirming that the birth scene wasn't as grotesque as described in the book and that she didn't "puke up blood", though director Bill Condon said that they shot everything as "powerful and potent as they could". Though there were many reports of the cast in Whistler, British Columbia, none of the actual filming took place in Whistler itself, but to the north and south of the town in nearby Pemberton (north) and Squamish (south). The Stars were housed in Whistler at 4 and 5 star hotels, the crew in Squamish and Pemberton.

Principal photography officially began on November 1, 2010 in Brazil, with locations in Rio de Janeiro and Paraty, Rio de Janeiro. The first scenes were shot in the Lapa District in Rio de Janeiro for one night. A long city block was rented for shooting, and Summit Entertainment paid residents 50 to 500 reais (30 to 300 U.S. dollars) to not allow paparazzi or fans to overlook filming from their windows. Moreover, owners of bars and restaurants were paid 10,000 and 20,000 reais (6,000 to 12,000 U.S. dollars) to stay closed for the evening to eliminate noise and provide a clear street.

Shooting then moved to Paraty, Rio de Janeiro where the honeymoon scenes were shot. According to Paraty's Tourism Office, filming took place in the Taquari area, near an unidentified waterfall, and at Mamangua Bay where a mansion is located. It rained on every day of shooting. In late November, shooting moved to Baton Rouge, Louisiana where most of the indoor scenes were shot on Raleigh Studios and in a house. Stewart had to wear heavy make-up to look thin and ghastly to show Bella through a phase of pregnancy where the baby starts breaking her bones. The birth scene took two nights to shoot after the cast had a long conversation with Meyer, a midwife, and a doctor to discuss the mechanics of the scene, particularly to decide the area where Edward should place his mouth to bite into Bella's placenta if this situation could ever occur in real life. An animatronic baby was used to film a few scenes of newborn Renesmee. The cast and crew spent two months of the filming process shooting in a green-screen room on fake snow. Reportedly, a few scenes were also shot in Arsenal Park using green screens.

In late February and early March, filming of most of the exterior shots, along with Bella's vampire scenes, occurred in Canada. The film's first shooting location in Canada was Vancouver. However, the cast and crew were evacuated from the set due to the tsunami advisories resulting from the 9.0-magnitude earthquake that hit Japan on March 11, 2011. Toni Atterbury, a spokeswoman for the film, said that "the crew was moved to higher ground" as a safety precaution and "the shoot was delayed for a few hours, but the day's work was accomplished". Therefore, filming relocated to Squamish, but a few scenes were shot in the Orpheum Theater with the Vancouver police covering all the entrances of the theater.

The wedding scene in Part 1 was the last scene the cast and crew shot. It was also shot under tight security. A helicopter hovered above the set, off-duty police officers surrounded the location, and sheets and umbrellas were used to protect the set from aerial shots being taken. Stewart spoke about the wedding at San Diego Comic-Con, describing it as "insane". She went on to say that it was "secret service style. The crew was incredibly inconvenienced. No cell phone, etc. They wanted to keep the dress secret." Concerning the wedding dress, Stewart was locked in a room wearing a Volturi cloak to cover the dress.

Stewart further talked about filming the scene, saying, "I wanted to run down the aisle. I was literally pulling away from Billy Burke. Now it's a trip to watch the wedding scenes. It was so volatile and emotional—I was being such a crazy person." Condon spoke about it saying, "The last scene we filmed was the dance scene between Jacob and Bella at the wedding. The last shot is Jacob leaving. I called "Cut!" and then Kristen yelled, "Jacob!" and hiked her dress up and started running after him into the woods, saying, "Come back! Don't leave!"

Filming wrapped on April 15, 2011. However, on April 22, what is believed to be additional scenes that would fit into the honeymoon sequence were filmed on Saint Thomas, U.S. Virgin Islands in the Caribbean, which was officially the last day of shooting. The crew, Stewart, and Pattinson were shooting in the sea all day long, then went out for cocktails on the beach and watched the sunrise. On the subject of the final day and her final moment as Bella, Stewart stated, "After that scene, my true final scene, I felt like I could shoot up into the night sky and every pore of my body would shoot light. I felt lighter than I've ever felt in my life." Pattinson thought the day was "amazing" and commented, "I then asked myself why we didn't do this in those four years. Every difficult moment just vanished."

=== Costume design ===
In October 2010, it was announced that Michael Wilkinson would be the film's costume designer. However, Bella's wedding dress was designed by someone other than Wilkinson. Meyer's description of the dress was "a simpler style than the frillier Edwardian stuff. …Elegant white satin, cut on the bias, with long sleeves." At first, Zac Posen was rumored to be the designer of Bella's wedding dress; however, these rumors proved false when Posen tweeted: "Heard the Bella/Twilight rumor and it's just that. I design for real women like Kristen Stewart and Anna Kendrick". In April 2011, Summit announced that Carolina Herrera is the designer of the dress. Stewart described the dress as very tight, but still liked it and thought that "it was very pretty". Meyer told USA Today that the dress was "an interesting mix" and has a "vintage feel, but at the same time, there's an edge to it".

Concerning Alice's bridesmaid dress, its designer remains unknown, however it was presumably designed by Wilkinson. Ashley Greene described the dress as "magical and beautiful" and spoke about the design process, saying, "We wanted to have all the bridesmaids fit together and also have their own identity. So, we took a little bit of Alice's past and put it into her dress." Corsets were added to all the cast's wedding dresses, but were removed during filming because the cast felt uncomfortable wearing them while dancing.

Alfred Angelo has been named the exclusive and official licensed manufacturer of Bella's bridal gown. The gown will be a replica of Bella's wedding dress and marketed under the brand Twilight Bridal by Alfred Angelo. It will be revealed in late November 2011, following the release of Part 1, and will be available in Alfred Angelo Signature Stores and independent retailers worldwide.

=== Post-production ===
In October 2010, Condon announced that Oscar-winning visual effects supervisor John Bruno, along with his team, would helm the visual effects for Breaking Dawn, including the effects necessary to show Renesmee in her various stages of life in Part 2. Later in February, Adam Howard was added to the Breaking Dawn visual effects team to help create the visual effects for Renesmee, due to his notable work on a similar issue in The Social Network. Condon revealed that Mackenzie Foy's face and expressions will be placed digitally on the bodies of the other actresses playing the same character through her various stages of life. Condon spoke about the process saying, "Sometimes it was hard because the other actresses were actually just there. It was always going to be just Mackenzie's expressions and things like that, so it was a very specific technical thing that even I was learning as we did it. But I have to say, they were real troopers these girls." Furthermore, special effects were also used to illustrate the invisible powers and forces between the vampires in the final battle sequence of Part 2.

Montreal-based Modus FX created subtle CG effects for Part 1. It created stylized effects to emphasize the supernatural capabilities of the main characters without making them too obvious or noticeable. A team of 12 artists spent six weeks working on the film. Shots included creating the belly of a pregnant Bella, removing a wrist brace Stewart was wearing in the wedding scene due to an injury, and a variety of subtle cosmetic refinements. Bella's pregnancy was a challenge for Modus; the production team wanted the baby to kick and move around inside her belly, so the artists and cinematographer had to match the camera moves, the lighting, even the film grain, along with the subtleties of Stewart's skin. On the subject, CG supervisor Martin Pelletier said,

For this project, we had to be really quick in terms of turn around. We made use of very complex lighting from the set, adding 3D layers, and a matchmove of her stomach, to make her look pregnant. We took our time at the start to get the recipe right and that paid off in efficiency once we got going. We were soon able to turn around several shots each day.

During the wedding scene, the camera pans around Pattinson and Stewart. Due to a minor wrist injury Stewart had, she was wearing a brace on the day of the shoot. Therefore, Modus was required to create a CG model of the hand and then carefully craft a rig to create natural motions. Once that was finished, every minute movement of the hand had to be matched exactly. The rotational panning shot totals 300 frames and called for elaborate camera and object tracking. Modus used subsurface scattering to accurately capture the partial translucence of her skin to make it look more authentic. Pelletier explained that "tracking was particularly challenging, because when they were shooting it, they weren't thinking about it as an effects shot. There was no camera metadata for the sequence." The solution was to do a series of careful manual adjustments until the light sources were correctly replicated on the set.

In July, Condon said that the first cut of Part 1 would be finished in a few weeks, but the visual effects were still in development. Godfrey later stated that they were "very close to locking picture on part one", and that its running time is equal to Twilight, New Moon and Eclipse, therefore approximately two hours. A few weeks later, Godfrey announced that he had seen numerous cuts of the film and called it "incredibly powerful already. …It definitely captures what the book captures." Concerning the subject of the MPAA rating, Godfrey said that the studio does not "have any word yet on the rating", but insisted that it is going to be rated PG-13. Condon discussed the matter further saying, "I think it's a good challenge because the thing that makes something R is literally showing it and if you give yourself that rule: I'm not gonna show, it's not going to be frontal nudity, no one wants that", and added, "we're not going to, again, show splattering blood against the walls but it's gonna be very visceral. It actually becomes a fun challenge to make sure you feel like you have the same experience without having to watch something clinical. I think it makes it better."

=== Music ===
On January 14, 2011, it was announced that Carter Burwell, composer of the first film in the series, will be returning to score both parts of the final installment. The score of Part 1 was recorded in Abbey Road Studios, London in early September. Alexandre Desplat and Howard Shore, the composers of New Moon and Eclipse, respectively, happened to be in London at the time of the recording session and stopped by to visit Burwell.

The Twilight Saga: Breaking Dawn: Part 1: Original Motion Picture Soundtrack was released on November 8, 2011. In July, Condon said that they are still under negotiations for the soundtrack and have 15 songs to choose from, but no deals have been signed with any artists. He also hinted that there's a good chance that the cast's musically-inclined members would feature on the soundtrack, which leaves chance to Robert Pattinson, Jackson Rathbone, Booboo Stewart, and Jamie Campbell Bower. American rock band Evanescence expressed interest in landing a song on the Breaking Dawn soundtrack. Will Hunt, the drummer of the band, said, "I've been screaming for [new song] 'My Heart Is Broken' to land in that, because I think it would fit the story so well." The lead singer of the band, Amy Lee, agreed, adding, "I think that would be awesome, actually." Also notable is the fact that the band had attempted to land songs on the soundtrack of Twilight, but Summit did not approve of the songs they presented. This is the first soundtrack not to feature a song from the band Muse.

On September 22, 2011, it was confirmed that the lead single of the soundtrack is a song by American pop singer Bruno Mars called "It Will Rain" to be released exclusively on iTunes on September 27.

== Marketing ==
=== Promotion ===
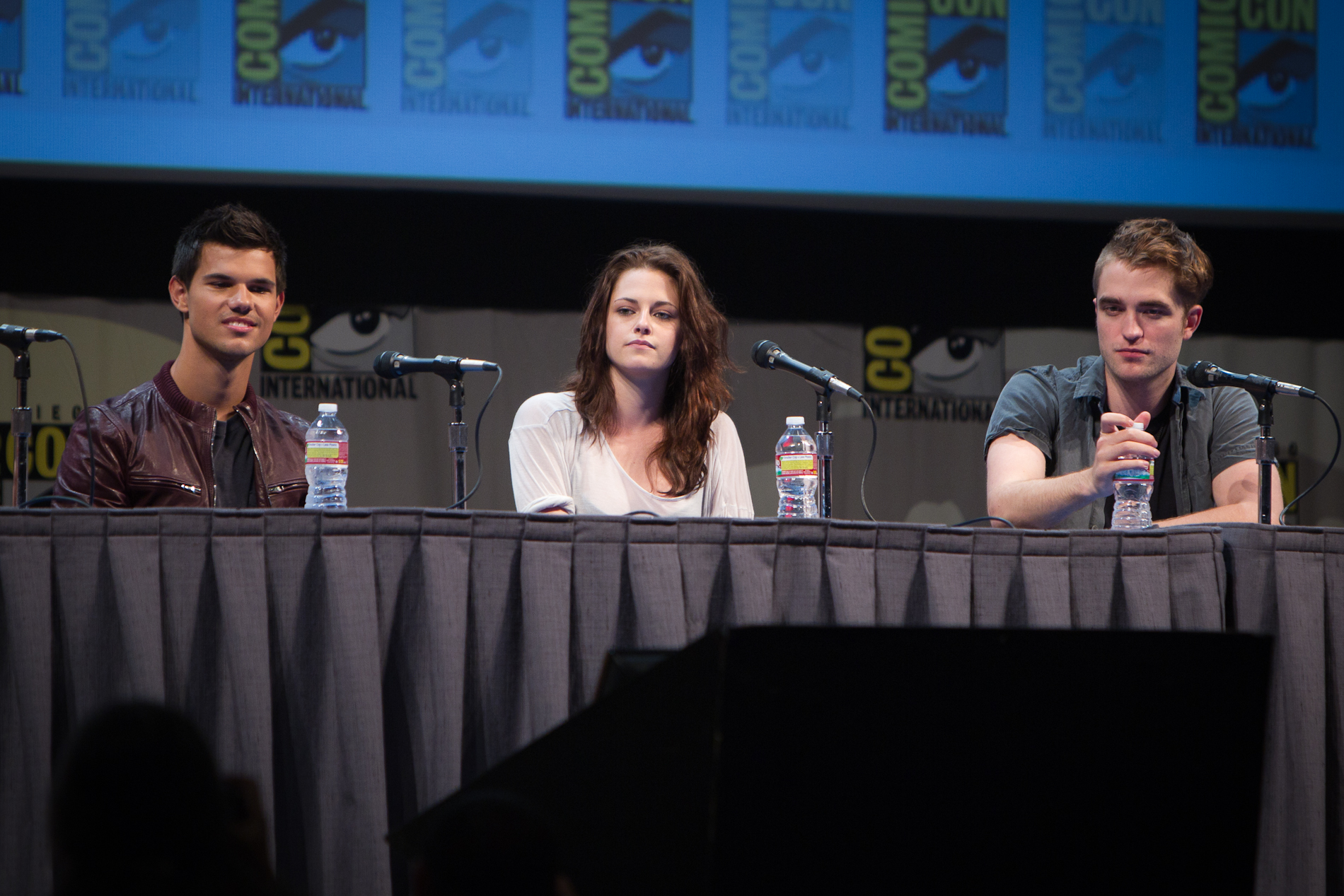
(Left to right) Taylor Lautner, Kristen Stewart, and Robert Pattinson at 2011 San Diego Comic-Con to promote the film

The teaser poster of Breaking Dawn was released on May 24. After giving fans a sneak peek on June 2, MTV released the first official teaser trailer on June 5, the night of the MTV Movie Awards. It was released online shortly before the awards show began and then made its television debut during the broadcast.

On July 21, Summit held a sold-out Comic-Con panel in Hall H, which held 6,500 fans, promoting Part 1. Condon, Stewart, Pattinson and Lautner attended the panel and answered the fans' questions along with showing them exclusive clips from the film. Cast members arrived early in the morning and signed autographs and posters for the midnight-camping fans and Summit booths offered them Breaking Dawn: Part 1 character trading cards.

Breaking Dawn: Part 1 footage was screened in Empire Movie Con in the UK on August 13. In addition, Alfred Angelo will host a private screening of Part 1 for forty-nine selected fans on November 15 and another screening for twenty friends two days later via sweepstakes.

=== Leaks ===
When the filming started on November 7, 2010 in the Lapa District and Paraty, Rio de Janeiro, Brazil, leaked set photos and footage videos surfaced online. Summit Entertainment responded to the leaks by removing the photos and videos from YouTube, fansites and gossip websites. On January 13, 2011, scans of a still of Kristen Stewart and Robert Pattinson in one of their honeymoon scenes in an Entertainment Weekly article ran online, prior to the magazine's official release of the still. On March 31 and April 1, 2011, a mass leak of a 14-second video and numerous low-quality stills hit the Internet resulting to enthusiastic fan reaction and speculations that the film wouldn't be able to maintain a PG-13 rating. Summit Entertainment released an official statement in response to the leaks saying:

As some of you may know, pictures and screen grabs of The Twilight Saga: Breaking Dawn as a work in progress have leaked on the internet. We are extremely proud of this film and also extremely heartbroken to see it out there at this stage. The film and these images are not yet ready or in their proper context. They were illegally obtained and their early dissemination is deeply upsetting to the actors, the filmmakers and Summit who are working so hard to bring these movies to fruition to you in November 2011 and November 2012.

Please, for those who are posting, stop. And please, though the temptation is high, don't view or pass on these images. Wait for the film in its beautiful, finished entirety to thrill you.

Sincerely,

Stephenie Meyer, Bill Condon, Wyck Godfrey and Summit Entertainment.

Additionally, the first teaser trailer leaked online hours before its debut at the MTV Movie Awards.

==== Lawsuit ====
On August 1, 2011, Summit released a press release announcing the identification of some of the alleged people responsible for the leak of images and video from Breaking Dawn on March 31 and April 1 and the decision to take legal action. Summit claimed that the leak came from Posadas, Argentina, but due to the possibility that other people might be involved in the leak, the investigation was still ongoing. The only person Summit named was a woman called Daiana Santia, resident in Posadas, allegedly being involved in the group that stole the images and footage. Civil action has been filed in the U.S. and Argentina, while criminal action has also been filed in Argentina. Summit hired law firm Keats McFarland & Wilson LLP to search four continents, North America, South America, Europe and Australia, to find the other people behind the leak.

Santia hosted a press conference in her town and denied Summit's claims. She claimed that she only saw the images "while surfing the Internet" and didn't send them to anyone. She also stated that she didn't log in anywhere to see them and denies having the technical knowledge of hacking, specifically saying that she "in no way be considered a "hacker" because [she] has no computer skills other than simple user level". Her attorney confirmed that Santia and her family are considering a counterclaim against Summit due to defamation of character and continual harassment by the film's producers who kept requesting that she would let them check her computer to see if she still has the images on her hard disk, although she refused more than once claiming that she is innocent and her computer contains personal items. Her attorney called the situation "a harm to privacy and personal right".

Summit's official response to the press conference said, "First and most important this is NOT about greed or the Studio wanting to bully a woman from a small town in Argentina—rather, it is about stolen material that is private and sensitive which was obtained by illegally accessing private/secure servers as well as personal email accounts." Summit gave details about the case stating that the studio has been in contact with Santia since May 2011, but "with no resolution or further good faith efforts on their part, thus the only alternative left was to pursue legal action to ascertain that Ms. Santia no longer holds the images and video in any shape or form". In the response, Summit announced the following claims:

Specifically on June 8, 2011, Ms. Santia confessed in the presence of her attorney that she accessed servers and email accounts via a systematic attack—stealing photographs, unfinished images and video footage over several months. Additionally there is indisputable evidence linking her directly to IP addresses that were used in the unauthorized access. Her actions appear to be premeditated and not done on a whim, but rather using technology and tactics that require thought as well as time and skill. Because Ms. Santia decided that she does not want to cooperate, Summit has been unable to settle this matter privately with Ms. Santia and her representatives in Argentina.

== Home media ==
The DVD and Blu-ray Disc for The Twilight Saga: Breaking Dawn – Part 1 was made available to purchase on February 11, 2012. Both editions include bonus features such as Bella and Edward's wedding video, fast-forwarding to favorite scenes, audio commentary with director Bill Condon, and a 6-part "Making Of" documentary. The film was released on DVD and Blu-ray by Universal Studios. In North American DVD sales, Part 1 has currently grossed $94,845,346 and has sold more than 5,234,876 units.

An "extended version" was released on March 2, 2013; this version features an additional seven minutes of footage, making the film 124 minutes, including eight additional scenes, two missing scenes, and three alternate scenes.

== Reception ==
=== Box office ===
The Twilight Saga: Breaking Dawn – Part 1 grossed $281,287,133 in North America and $449,867,136 in other countries, bringing its worldwide total to $731,664,759. It earned a The Twilight Saga film series-best $291.0 million on its worldwide opening weekend, marking the tenth-largest worldwide opening of all time. It reached $500 million worldwide in 12 days, a record time for the film series. It ranks as the fourth-highest-grossing film of 2011 and the second-highest-grossing film of the film series.

==== North America ====
Breaking Dawn – Part 1 (which opened on November 18, 2011 in 4,061 theaters) was projected to reap at least $140 million in its opening weekend. The film earned $30.25 million in midnight showings, which was the second-highest midnight gross ever, at the time, behind Harry Potter and the Deathly Hallows – Part 2 ($43.5 million) as well as the highest midnight gross of the film series, until it was surpassed by The Twilight Saga: Breaking Dawn – Part 2's gross of $30.4 million. On its opening day, the movie topped the box office with $71.6 million (including midnight showings), which is the fifth-highest opening and single-day gross of all time. On its opening weekend, Breaking Dawn – Part 1 claimed first place with $138.1 million, which was the second-highest opening weekend of the film series, at the time, behind The Twilight Saga: New Moon ($142.8 million), as well as the fourth-highest November opening ever behind The Hunger Games: Catching Fire, New Moon, and Breaking Dawn – Part 2. It is also the tenth-highest opening weekend of all time. The movie also had the second-best opening weekend of 2011 in North America behind Harry Potter and the Deathly Hallows – Part 2 ($169.2 million).

It retained first place on its second three-day weekend, declining 70% to $41.9 million, and earned $61.8 million over the five-day Thanksgiving weekend. Breaking Dawn – Part 1 remained No. 1 for a third weekend, marking the best third-weekend gross for a Twilight film ($16.5 million) and the second film of 2011 to top the weekend box office three times, along with The Help. Closing on February 23, 2012, with $281.3 miilion, it is the third-highest-grossing movie of 2011. It is also the fourth-highest-grossing film in the series, only ahead of the first film ($192.8 million).

==== Markets outside North America ====
The film earned $8.9 million in its first two days from five markets. By the end of its first weekend, it earned $152.9 million at about 9,950 locations in 54 markets, which was a new film series high. Its biggest debut was in the United Kingdom, Ireland, and Malta with £13,910,877 ($22.0 million), which was a new high for the series. It was also huge in many European and Latin American countries. It remained in first place at the box office outside North America for three consecutive weekends. With $423.8 million, it is the highest-grossing film of the film series and the sixth-highest-grossing film of 2011. Its highest-grossing region after North America is the UK, Ireland, and Malta ($48.8 million), followed by Brazil ($35.0 million) and Germany ($33.1 million).

=== Critical response ===
Breaking Dawn – Part 1 received mixed-to-negative reviews from critics. On review aggregation website Rotten Tomatoes 25% of critics (of the 210 counted reviews) gave the film a positive review with an average rating of 4.4/10. The site's consensus reads: "Slow, joyless, and loaded with unintentionally humorous moments, Breaking Dawn Part 1 may satisfy the Twilight faithful, but it's strictly for fans of the franchise." The review site Metacritic gave the film a 45 out of 100, based on reviews from 36 critics. It is the lowest-rated installment in the franchise, which was previously New Moon. Audiences polled by CinemaScore gave the film a "B+" grade, the audience was 80% female and 60% over 21 years old. Among females only, the film received an improved "A−" grade.

Justin Chang of Variety gave the film a negative review, calling the film "disappointing". Todd McCarthy of The Hollywood Reporter also gave the film a negative review, calling Part 1 "bloated". Brent Simon of Screen International called the film "soapy and melodramatic". Peter Bradshaw of The Guardian gave the film one star out of a possible five, and referred to it as the next stage of an "emo-operetta" that "sweeps us away on a new riptide of mawkish euphoria". Roger Ebert of the Chicago Sun-Times gave the film two-and-a-half stars, saying that it is filled with a lot of unanswered questions, but calling Stewart's portrayal of Bella "pretty good". The television show Film 2011's Claudia Winkleman gave the film a negative review, calling it "hilarious". Writing for Rolling Stone, Peter Travers said Breaking Dawn – Part 1 is "the worst Twilight movie yet" and thought Taylor Lautner looked like a "petulant five-year-old". Mary Pols of Time magazine named it one of the Top 10 Worst Movies of 2011, saying "this entry, which held within it the teasing promise of explosive consummation, instead delivered soap-opera-level dry humping in high-thread-count sheets", and concluded, "This was the bloodiest of the Twilight movies but somehow the most bloodless."

Conversely, Gabriel Chong of "Movie Exclusive" gave the film four stars out of a possible five, praising the dialogue, wedding and action scenes, and particularly Condon's direction, stating, "In the hands of a lesser director, the turn of events could very well descend into farce—thankfully then, this movie has found a masterful helmsman in Condon." He went on to praise Stewart's performance, calling it "mesmerising" and saying that she "makes [Bella's] every emotion keenly felt that runs the gamut from joy, trepidation, anxiety, distress and above all quiet and resolute determination." Mark Adams of Daily Mirror also gave the film four stars out of five and said, "The Twilight films manage to cleverly blend melodrama with supernatural thrills, and while the film is not without its silly moments and cringeworthy dialogue it does deliver the drama and emotional highs we have come to expect". He also praised the wedding, describing it as "beautifully staged", and Stewart's performance. Other positive reviewers from The New York Times and Philadelphia Inquirer said the dialogue was improving and the whole movie played out with style, while being faithful to the book and servicing hardcore fans. MSN Entertainment critic Alaina O'Connor gave Condon some praise for bringing "a certain visual elegance that helps with some of the more-absurd elements of the story." O'Connor also felt that the film did a good job of "examining the relationship between Edward and Bella", but felt that the narrative was weak otherwise. The film was also ranked the tenth best film of 2011 by E!. Will Brooker, writing for Times Higher Education, makes the case that Breaking Dawn has a feminist element, stating that it "reverse(s) the embedded cinematic conventions of male voyeur and female-as-spectacle", and that "the lack of attention to (Bella) as sex object is remarkable."

The film also drew both criticism and praise for having what was seen as an anti-abortion theme. Natalie Wilson, writing for the Ms. magazine blog, described what she saw as the book's "latent anti-abortion message" as "problematic from a feminist perspective" and found this element "heightened, not diminished, in the film", citing scenes in which Rosalie scolds Alice for using the word "fetus". Richard Lawson of The Atlantic said that Bella's pregnancy "serves as the narrative dais from which Meyer, and in complicity Condon and the screenwriter Melissa Rosenberg, delivers a startlingly direct and uncovered anti-abortion sermon", adding "it seems there was no escaping the firmly anti-choice themes of this leg of the story, and so we must sit and grumble while sickly Bella is scored by plaintive strings as she chooses the one true moral path". Neil Morris of Independent Weekly said that the film "takes up a radically pro-life mantle when Bella refuses to abort her baby, even though her life may depend on it". Sandie Angulo Chen of Moviefone described the "bulk" of the film as "one long pro-life debate", in which "Bella says it's her body, her choice (terms usually used in the pro-choice movement), but her decision is pro-life to the extreme, because the baby can and will kill her". In contrast, John Mulderig of the Catholic News Service praised the "strongly pro-life message being conveyed via Bella's unusual plight", saying it "presents a welcome counterpoint to the all-too-frequent motif in popular entertainment whereby pregnancy is presented as a form of disease or an almost unbearable curse".

In an interview with Screen Rant, screenwriter Rosenberg addressed the perception of an anti-abortion message in the film, stating, "If I could not find my way into it that didn't violate my beliefs (because I am extremely pro-choice very outspoken about it, very much a feminist) I would not have written this move [sic]. They could have offered me the bank and I still wouldn't have. In order to embrace it I had to find a way to deal with it. I also had no interest in violating Stephenie's belief system or anyone on the other side".

On February 25, Breaking Dawn – Part 1 was nominated for eight Razzie Awards, including: Worst Picture; Worst Prequel, Remake, Rip-Off or Sequel; Worst Screen Ensemble; Worst Director (for Bill Condon); Worst Screenplay; Worst Actor (for Taylor Lautner), and Worst Actress (for Kristen Stewart). The Worst Screen Couple award for Kristen Stewart with either Taylor Lautner or Robert Pattinson was also included. The film lost all categories to Jack and Jill.

=== Health issues ===
A week following the film's release, incidents began occurring of the birthing scene having triggered epileptic seizures in moviegoers. The visual effects during the scene involves several pulsating red, white, and black flashing lights, which creates an effect similar to a strobe light. Reports of such photosensitive seizures have been reported in Sacramento, California, and Salt Lake City, Utah. The incidents have become more widespread as news of the incidents began to flood several news sites, making people aware that health issues that attendees were experiencing might have been caused by the scene. Famed comic book artist Jim Lee tweeted that he and his family had to leave a screening of the film after "our 11-year-old son literally threw up during the birthing scene." The people who have experienced seizures during the film are reportedly "perfectly healthy people".

== See also ==
- Vampire film
