= Operation Breakthrough =

1988 US–Soviet gray whale rescue in northern Alaska

Point Barrow Nuvuk
- Northernmost point of the US
- Location within the state of Alaska
- Coordinates: 71°23′20″N 156°28′45″W
- Country: United States
- State: Alaska
- Borough: North Slope
- Time zone: UTC-9 (Alaska (AKST))
  - Summer (DST): UTC-8 (AKDT)

Operation Breakthrough was a US-Soviet effort to free three gray whales from pack ice in the Beaufort Sea near Point Barrow in the U.S. state of Alaska in 1988. The whales' plight generated media attention that led to the collaboration of multiple governments and organizations to free them. The youngest whale died during the effort and it is unknown if the remaining two whales ultimately survived.

== Rescue effort ==
On October 7, 1988, Inupiaq hunter Roy Ahmaogak discovered three gray whales trapped in pack ice in the Beaufort Sea near Point Barrow in the U.S. state of Alaska. The hunter used a chainsaw to attempt cutting a path in the ice leading to open water. Fellow villagers helped the hunter by using water pumps to keep ice from reforming overnight. Word spread through the Inupiat community about the whales, and biologists from North Slope Borough, Alaska, visited the site and realized the danger. A Sikorsky S-64 Skycrane heavylift helicopter was tasked to create holes in the ice using a 5-ton hammer.

The first news story about the trapped whales was in Anchorage a week later. Rescuers tried to borrow a barge from Prudhoe Bay, to break the ice and clear a path, but the barge was locked in. The whales' plight gained more attention from the media as journalists called North Slope Borough and flew to the site. The National Oceanic and Atmospheric Administration sent a team of whale biologists, and the United States Department of State requested the help of two icebreakers from the Soviet Union who immediately responded to aid the rescue, the Vladimir Arseniev and the Admiral Makarov. When the whales attempted to take the exit path, a swarm of journalists caused them to swim back. Jagged ice from the rescue effort also cut the whales, bloodying the water. While the whales remained in their initial area, they were given Inuit names Putu, Siku, and Kanik and English names Bonnet, Crossbeak, and Bone, respectively. The youngest whale (Kanik), nine months old, died on October 21. On October 28, the Soviet Admiral Makarov broke apart a ridge of Arctic ice that was 400 yards (370 m) wide and 30 feet (9.1 m) high. The Vladimir Arseniev cleared the icy rubble to create a large enough path for the remaining two whales to theoretically escape.

After the path was cut observers could find no sign of the whales and the operation was declared a success. However, the remaining two whales were reportedly in very poor health at the time of the rescue and because radio tags were never attached, it is unknown if the animals survived. The rescue effort cost US $1 million USD but was criticized by scientists.

== Retrospect ==
A whale expert cited the rescue effort as a catalyst for a new public perspective about whales, saying, "Although the rescue of the gray whales trapped in the Alaskan ice involved huge expense to reverse a common and natural event, it underscored the changing attitudes of humans toward whales."

== See also ==
- Big Miracle, a fictionalized 2012 film depicting the rescue effort, after the 1989 book of the same name
- Moskva, a Soviet icebreaker that freed a herd of up to 3,000 beluga whales trapped in pack ice in February 1985
- List of individual cetaceans
