= Modus FX =

Modus FX - Canada
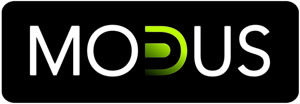
- Company type: Private
- Industry: Visual effects
- Founded: Sainte-Thérèse, Quebec (2007)
- Founder: Marc Bourbonnais, Yanick Wilisky
- Defunct: 2014
- Headquarters: Sainte-Thérèse, Quebec
- Area served: Worldwide
- Number of employees: approx. 120
- Website: www.modusfx.com

Modus FX is a Canadian visual effects studio in Quebec.

== Description ==
Co-founded by Yanick Wilisky and Marc Bourbonnais in 2007, Modus FX is a visual effects company that offers digital production services for film, television and new media. Modus FX has worked on projects for clients such as Marvel Studios, Summit Entertainment, Relativity Media, The Mark Gordon Company, Sony Pictures, Discovery Channel, Warner Bros. Interactive, and The History Channel. Wilisky and Bourbonnais have worked on VFX-driven feature film productions, including the following: The Avengers, 300, Mirror Mirror, Sin City, The Twilight Saga: Breaking Dawn – Part 1, Sky Captain and the World of Tomorrow, Snakes on a Plane and the Spy Kids trilogy.

Modus FX signed with International Creative Management ("ICM") one of the world's largest talent and literary agencies. The Montreal studio is the first Canadian postproduction house to be included in the prestigious entertainment agency's roster.

On February 28, 2014, the company, which at the time consisted of 100 staff members, was shut down due to financial problems. According to Wilisky, the company had mismanaged its growth, and that they were never able to restructure themselves. Wilisky would continue to work in the visual effects industry.

== Productions ==
Productions:

Past Production (films)

- 2015: Little Boy (89 shots)
- 2014: Against the Sun
- 2014: La Belle et La Bête
- 2014: RoboCop
- 2013: Riddick
- 2013: This Is the End (240 shots)
- 2013: Now You See Me (227 shots)
- 2013: The Legend of Sarila (950 shots)
- 2013: Parker (162 shots)
- 2012: The Avengers
- 2012: Mirror Mirror (194 shots)
- 2012: Big Miracle (132 shots)
- 2011: Immortals (2 shots)
- 2011: The Twilight Saga: Breaking Dawn – Part 1 (41 shots)
- 2011: March of the Dinosaurs (592 shots)
- 2011: Source Code (158 shots)
- 2011: Jane Eyre (47 shots)
- 2010: Super (158 shots)
- 2010: The American (125 shots)
- 2010: Arctic Blast (69 shots)
- 2010: Barney's Version (65 shots)
- 2010: Jonah Hex (6 shots)
- 2010: Oil: Extending City Dreams (for the 2010 World Exposition in Shanghai) (17 shots)
- 2009: Mr. Nobody (121 shots)
- 2009: Screamers: The Hunting (122 shots)
- 2009: Les corbeaux (349 shots)
- 2009: Red Cliff II
- 2008: Beverly Hills Chihuahua (movie trailer)

Past Production (Television)

- 2012: Strip the City (134 shots)
- 2010: America: The Story of Us (28 shots)
- 2010: Atlas 4D (50 shots)
- 2009: Dinolab II (192 shots)

Past Production (Other media)

- 2011: F3AR (189 shots) (video game)
- 2009: The Lord of the Rings: Aragorn's Quest (83 shots) (video game)
- 2009: Dragons 3D (17 shots) (IMAX film - teaser)
