= Big Miracle (book) =

1989 non-fiction book by Tom Rose

- First edition (under original name)
- Author: Tom Rose
- Original title: Freeing the Whales: How the Media Created the World's Greatest Non-Event.
- Language: English
- Genre: Nonfiction
- Publisher: Carol Publishing Group
- Publication date: 1989
- Publication place: United States
- Media type: Print (Paperback)
- Pages: 336 pp
- ISBN: 978-0-312-62519-1

Big Miracle is a book that tells the true story of three gray whales trapped beneath Arctic ice in the fall of 1988, and of Operation Breakthrough, the collaborative efforts to free them by oil company executives, activists, Inupiat people, the U.S. military, and Soviet ice-breakers. Written by journalist Tom Rose (who covered the event for a Japanese news channel at the time), the book was originally published in 1989, titled Freeing the Whales: How the Media Created the World's Greatest Non-Event. It was re-released under its current title by St. Martin's Press in 2011.

A film adaption of Big Miracle directed by Ken Kwapis, starring Drew Barrymore, Ted Danson, Kristen Bell, among other stars, was released in 2012.
