= Tom Rose =

American journalist and diplomat (born 1962)

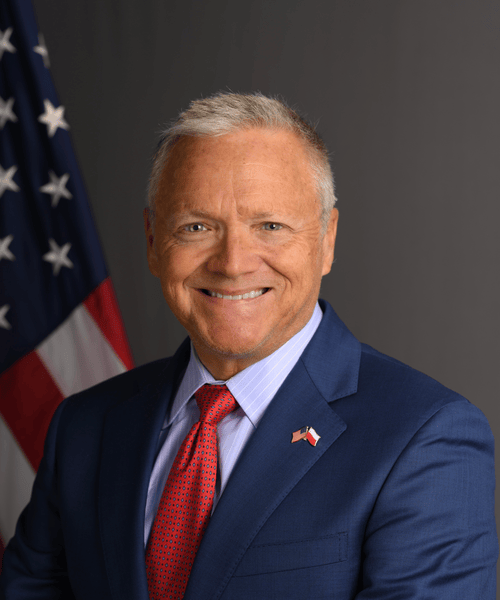
- Official portrait, 2025

United States Ambassador to Poland
- Incumbent
- Assumed office November 6, 2025
- President: Donald Trump
- Preceded by: Mark Brzezinski

Personal details
- Born: Thomas Rose; August 4, 1962 (age 64)
- Party: Republican
- Education: Brandeis University (BA); Columbia University (MA)

Thomas Rose (born August 4, 1962) is an American journalist and diplomat who has served as the United States Ambassador to Poland since 2025.

== Early life and education ==
Tom Rose was born in southern Indiana to Jewish parents and later moved to Indianapolis, where in the 1990s he formed a friendship with Mike Pence.

Rose graduated from Brandeis University with a Bachelor of Arts in History and from Columbia University with a Master of Arts in Diplomacy.

== Career ==
Rose started out as a journalist for Japanese television in the 1980s. In 1989, he wrote a book titled Big Miracle (originally Freeing the Whales), which received a film adaptation in 2012 starring Drew Barrymore and John Krasinski. Between 1997 and 2005, he was an editor and director general of The Jerusalem Post. For 10 years, he lived in Israel.

At SiriusXM, together with the former Republican politician Gary Bauer, he co-hosted a conservative radio broadcast named Bauer & Rose Show. As political commentator, he was hosted as a guest in various American and Israeli media. He has also written for the New York Post.

During the first presidency of Donald Trump he was senior adviser and chief political strategist of Vice President Mike Pence, being one of his closest affiliates. In that role, he had already distinguished himself as a friend of Poland, defending it against accusations made by Andrea Mitchell during an interview on MSNBC.

=== Ambassador to Poland ===
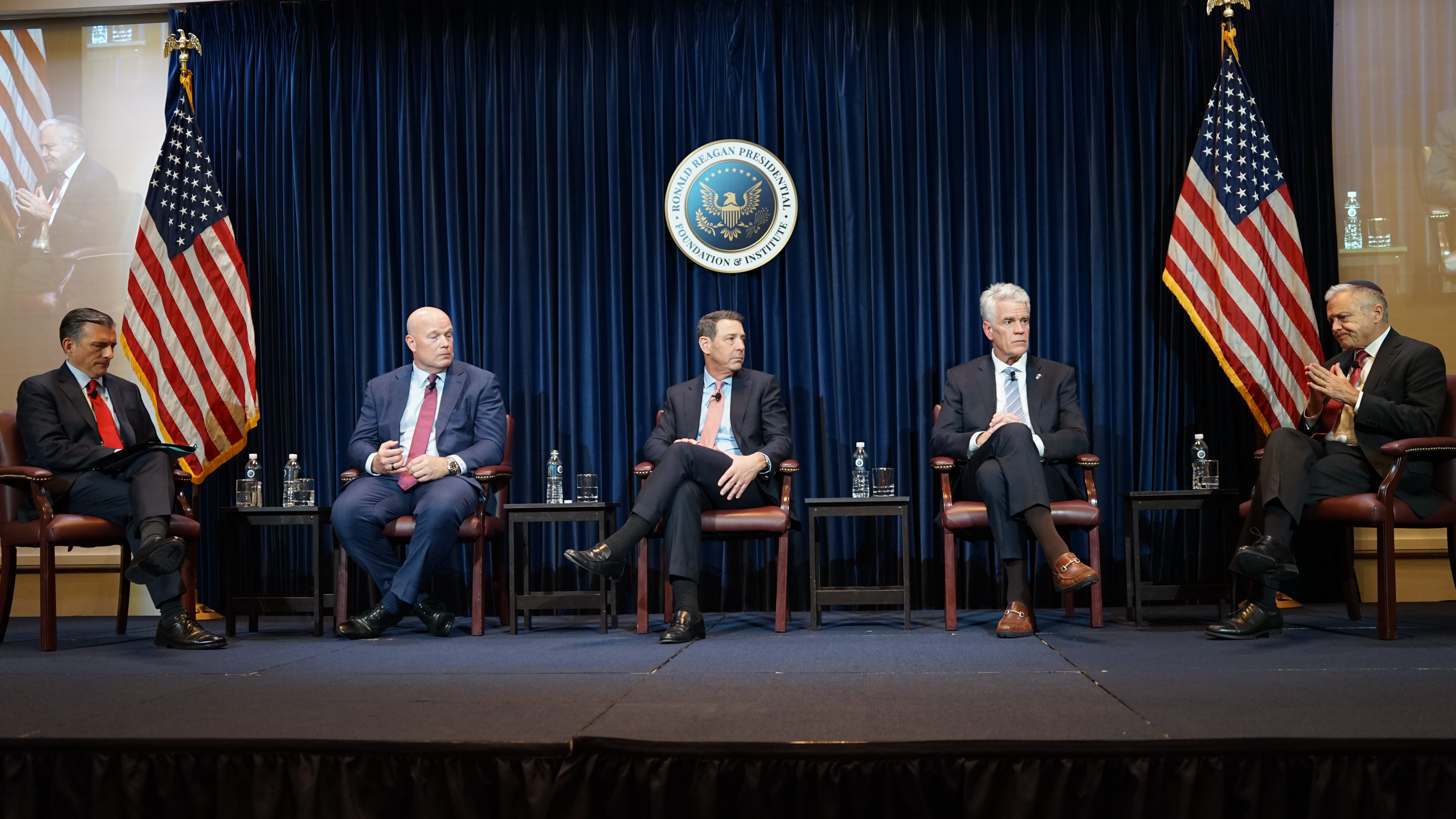
David Trulio, Matthew Whitaker, Joseph Popolo, Nicholas Merrick, Rose at Reagan Library

In February 2025, Donald Trump nominated Tom Rose as the United States Ambassador to Poland. He was sworn in on October 15 and on November 6 presented his credentials to President of Poland Karol Nawrocki in a ceremony at the Belweder. He has thus officially begun his diplomatic mission in Poland.

Before his nomination, Rose had criticized the current Prime Minister of Poland Donald Tusk and his government, among other things for the 2023 Polish public media crisis. At the same time he praised the formerly governing Law and Justice party and its allied then-president Andrzej Duda. Despite his Jewish background and support for Zionism, Tom Rose has recently been subject of much criticism in Israel for his outspoken defense of Poland and the Polish people in various historical matters. (Note: Suggesting that Rose has whitewashed the complicity of individual Poles and Polish institutions in the destruction and dispossession of Jews in German occupied Poland. An association of 1 Holocaust survivor's has also called him out calling his remarks at a meeting in Warsaw of the International Association of Jewish Lawyers and Judges at the end of November 2025, "deeply offensive on several levels" and "an insult to the memory of hundreds of thousands of Jews murdered by Poles during the Holocaust.") On the other hand, he has been praised in Poland for the same reasons. In February 2026, he had a clash with Włodzimierz Czarzasty, the Marshal of the Sejm, in the wake of president Trump's Nobel prize ambitions.

== Personal life ==
Rose is a supporter of Ukraine in the Russo-Ukrainian war. He is a follower of Orthodox Judaism.

Diplomatic posts
Preceded by Mark Brzezinski	United States Ambassador to Poland; 2025-	Succeeded by
