= Moskva (1959 icebreaker) =

Soviet icebreaker

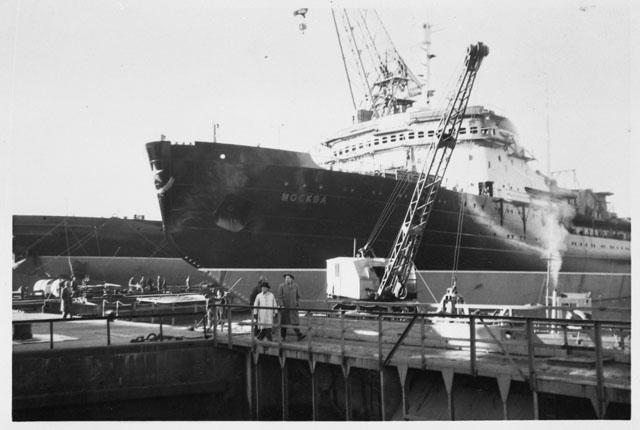
- Moskva under construction at Wärtsilä Hietalahti shipyard

History

Soviet Union
- Name: Moskva (Москва)
- Namesake: Moscow
- Port of registry: Vladivostok, Russia
- Ordered: 24 May 1956
- Builder: Wärtsilä Hietalahti shipyard, Helsinki, Finland
- Yard number: 365
- Launched: 10 January 1959
- Completed: 1960
- In service: 1960–1992
- Identification: IMO number: 5242495
- Fate: Broken up in 1992

General characteristics
- Class & type: Moskva-class icebreaker
- Displacement: 13,290 tonnes (design); 15,360 tonnes (maximum)
- Length: 122.10 m (400.6 ft)
- Beam: 24.50 m (80.4 ft)
- Draught: 9.50 m (31.2 ft) (design); 10.50 m (34.4 ft) (maximum)
- Installed power: 8 × Wärtsilä-Sulzer 9MH51 (8 × 3,250 hp)
- Propulsion: Diesel-electric; three shafts; 22,000 hp (16,400 kW)
- Speed: 18 knots (33 km/h; 21 mph)
- Crew: 109
- Aviation facilities: Helideck and hangar

Moskva (Russian: Москва; literally: Moscow) was a Soviet polar icebreaker and the lead ship of a series of five diesel-electric icebreakers named after major Soviet cities. She was built at Wärtsilä Hietalahti shipyard in Helsinki, Finland, in 1959 and when delivered was the largest and most powerful non-nuclear icebreaker ever built. Shortly after the dissolution of the Soviet Union, Moskva was decommissioned after a long and successful career along the Northern Sea Route and sold for scrap in 1992.

In February 1985, Moskva became the center of international attention when a pod of beluga whales was trapped by ice near the Chukchi Peninsula in the Soviet Far East. The icebreaker broke a channel through the ice pack and managed to lead about 2,000 whales to the open sea.

== Construction ==
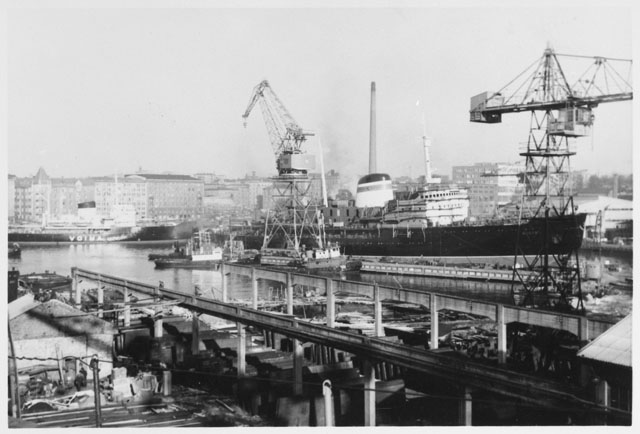
Moskva under construction at Wärtsilä Hietalahti shipyard.

In 1956, the 20th Congress of the Communist Party of the Soviet Union decided to increase the importance and capacity of the Northern Sea Route. This ambitious plan called for the construction of stronger and more powerful icebreakers, including the world's first nuclear-powered icebreaker Lenin, that could overcome the challenging ice conditions and extend the navigating season in the Russian Arctic. The new icebreaker designs were developed by the Leningrad-based Central Design Bureau-15 (today known as Central Design Bureau "Iceberg").

Following the successful delivery of three smaller diesel-electric icebreakers to the Soviet Union in 1954–1956, the Finnish shipbuilder Wärtsilä had established itself as one of the leading builders of icebreaking ships.

Once when the Soviet minister of commerce Anastas Mikoyan met the Wärtsilä manager Wilhelm Wahlforss, he expressed his satisfaction on quality and performance of Kapitan-class, and casually mentioned, that there is a need for even stronger icebreakers for the polar waters. He listed the requirements on a sheet of paper. Wahlforss called the Hietalahti shipyard manager Eric Holmström and the company's icebreaker specialist Ernst Bäckström to a meeting asking: "Are we able to construct such a ship?" Bäckström answered directly: "Yes, we are." Subsequently, Bäckström made a 1:500-scaled sketch of the new 22,000-hp icebreaker in relation to Kapitan-class. Wahlforss took the drawing with him in 1954 to a meeting in Moscow where he had dinner with Mikoyan. When Mikoyan opened the discussion about the new icebreaker concept, Wahlforss took the drawing from his suitcase asking "Is this what you need?". Mikoyan became very delighted and said: "For three years I have asked from our own shipyards for possibility to construct such a icebreaker, but I have only got headshaking!"

On 24 May 1956, Wärtsilä and Sudoimport, the Soviet foreign trade organization with a monopoly for the foreign trade of ships, signed a shipbuilding contract for the construction of two polar icebreakers. While only half as powerful as the 44,000 hp Lenin, the new icebreakers featured the most powerful diesel-electric power plant ever installed on a ship at the time. The Soviet negotiators had additional requirements for deep draught and fuel consumption, which Wahlforss promised Wärtsilä to reach. In practice, the demands put the company's engineering expertise to a tough test. At the end, however, Wärtsilä could deliver what Wahlforss had promised. A few years later, Wärtsilä received a follow-up order for three more icebreakers of the same design.

The hull of the icebreaker was assembled on a slipway and launched on 10 January 1959. Prior to this, the harbor basin and the entrance channel had to be dredged. In addition, a special steel pontoon had to be constructed and welded to the stern of the icebreaker in order to reduce stresses and allow safe launching of the heavy ice-strengthened hull. In the launching ceremony, the new icebreaker was given the name Moskva after the Soviet capital while the other icebreakers of the series were named after the largest cities of the Soviet Union. The construction of the vessel continued in the outfitting quay and Moskva was delivered during the summer of 1960.

== Service history ==
In October 1961, after assisting more than a hundred cargo ships in the Russian Arctic during the autumn navigating season, Moskva completed an eastbound transit of the Northern Sea Route from Murmansk to Vladivostok in only 10 days. This was both a record time as well as the latest time a successful transit had been completed before the winter, and demonstrated how the shipping season could be extended with modern icebreakers. Afterwards, Moskva was stationed in Vladivostok and used to escort in the eastern part of the Northern Sea Route.

On 20 October 1965, Moskva and her sister ship Leningrad came to assist Vitimles, a merchant ship that had been waiting for icebreaker assistance for 30 days in the East Siberian Sea. However, by the time the icebreakers arrived, the pack ice had begun to drift at a considerable speed and a dangerous phenomenon known as "ice jet" appeared, immobilizing the icebreakers. The ice pressure caused severe damage to Vitimles and the ship, which had been built in Poland only a year before, sank with no loss of life on 24 October. During the same season, both icebreakers also damaged their propellers due to the severe ice conditions.

In 1966, Moskva was awarded the Order of Lenin for her successful service on the Northern Sea Route.

While new and more powerful icebreakers were built in the 1970s and 1980s, Moskva continued to escort merchant ships in the eastern part of the Northern Sea Route. However, already by the mid-1980s the icebreaker was described as being "definitely past its prime".

Following the dissolution of the Soviet Union, the traffic volumes along the Northern Sea Route declined drastically in the early 1990s due to the slowdown of the Russian economy. As a result, it was decided to decommission the Moskva-class icebreakers. The oldest vessel of the series, Moskva, was sold for scrap in 1992. The name was later given to a 2008-built diesel-electric icebreaker, the first non-nuclear icebreaker delivered by a Russian shipyard in more than three decades.

=== Operation Beluga ===
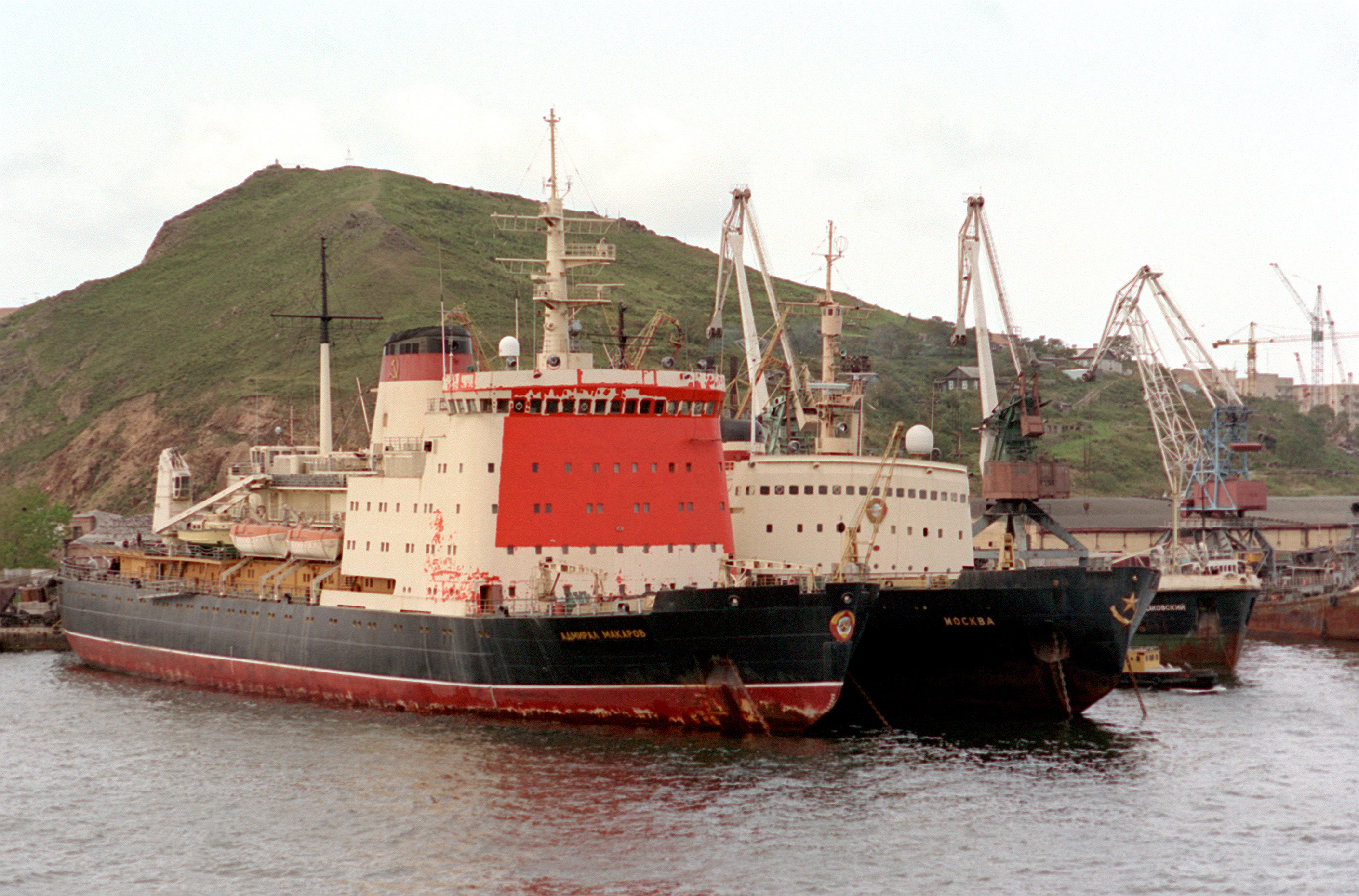
Both Admiral Makarov (left) and Moskva were involved in two separate whale rescue operations in the 1980s. The photograph was taken in 1992 shortly after the dissolution of the Soviet Union and before Moskva was sold for scrap.

In late December 1984, a Chukchi hunter spotted a herd of up to 3,000 beluga whales struggling for breathing room in small pools of open water in the ice-covered waters off the Chukchi Peninsula. Easterly winds had packed the narrow Senyavin Strait with drift ice up to 12 feet (4 m) thick, creating a wide ice pack that the whales could not cross on a single breath. While the locals tried to keep the animals alive by feeding them with frozen fish and keeping the breathing holes open, it soon became evident that the belugas would eventually die unless they could be freed.

In February 1985, Moskva was called from the Bering Sea in to break a channel through the ice pack and free the trapped herd. On 22 February, the icebreaker finally reached the belugas, but at first they refused to follow the ship to open water. However, when the crew began playing classical music through the ship's loudspeakers, the whales finally followed Moskva to the unfrozen sea. In the end, it was estimated that about 2,000 whales escaped while slightly more than 500 were taken by the local hunters. Using Moskva for the rescue operation, dubbed "Operation Beluga", cost the Soviet government about $80,000.

In 1988, a similar rescue operation was attempted to free three gray whales from pack ice in the Beaufort Sea near Point Barrow, Alaska. As part of the $1 million effort, the United States Department of State requested help from the Soviet Union who sent the icebreaker Admiral Makarov and ice-strengthened Arctic cargo ship Vladimir Arsenyev to break the ice trapping the whales.

== Technical details ==
=== General characteristics ===
Moskva was 122.10 metres (401 ft) long overall and 112.40 metres (369 ft) at the waterline. At the widest point of the hull, the vessel had a beam of 24.50 metres (80 ft), but due to the sloping sides the maximum beam at waterline was slightly less, 23.50 metres (77 ft). At design waterline, the icebreaker drew 9.5 metres (31 ft) of water and had a displacement of 13,290 tonnes. However, the maximum draught of the vessel was 10.5 metres (34 ft), corresponding to a maximum displacement of 15,360 tonnes. Moskva was the largest non-nuclear icebreaker in the world at the time of the delivery, having almost twice the displacement of the largest western icebreakers.

Designed to withstand the compression of the polar pack ice, the fully welded steel hull of Moskva was very strong. The 6-metre (20 ft) wide ice belt, where the hull plating was over 50 millimetres (2.0 in) thick in the bow, was designed to withstand ice pressures of up to 1,000 tonnes per square meter (about 1,400 psi), more than 30 to 60 times as much as normal merchant ships at the time. In bow and stern, the web frames were aligned perpendicularly to the shell plating. Longitudinally, the hull was divided into nine watertight compartments and the vessel had a full-length double hull below tweendeck.

Moskva had single and double cabins for 109 persons. In addition to vessel crew and aviation detachment, accommodation and laboratories were reserved for scientists when the icebreaker carried out research expeditions in the polar waters. Special attention had been paid to the furnishing and decoration of the public spaces, which included a game room and a music room with a piano for the officers. The icebreaker was delivered from the shipyard with a total of three television sets.

Designed to escort merchant ships through ice-covered waters, Moskva had a towing winch and a notch in the stern where the bow of the towed ship would be pulled. For ice reconnaissance, the icebreaker had a helicopter hangar and a landing platform in the stern. The vessel had two motor lifeboats for 60 persons and two 70-person lifeboats with manually operated propeller. In addition, the icebreaker carried a 11.5-metre (38 ft) motor launch with a steel hull, a 9-metre (30 ft) aluminum boat, two fiberglass ice sledge-boats, a 4.5-metre (15 ft) rowing boat and a light aluminum dinghy. The boats were launched using the icebreakers' two 10-ton deck cranes.

=== Power and propulsion ===
Moskva was a diesel-electric icebreaker with a power plant consisting of eight 9-cylinder Wärtsilä-Sulzer 9MH51 single-acting two-stroke diesel engines, each of which was rated at 3,250 hp in continuous operation but capable of 10% overload for one hour at a time. The main engines were directly coupled to Siemens direct current (DC) generators that supplied electricity to propulsion motors through an applied Ward Leonard drive system. Normally, four generators were connected to the tandem electric motor driving the centerline propeller shaft and two generators to the propulsion motors driving the wing shafts, but the system allowed connecting two generators from the center circuit to either port or starboard circuit and vice versa in case of engine failure.

The electric power produced by the main engines and generators was transformed into propeller thrust by three large DC motors coupled to the propeller shafts. The centerline propulsion motor, located in a separate compartment, was a tandem unit consisting of two 5,500 hp motors while the port and starboard propulsion motors, located side by side in the same compartment, were rated at 5,500 hp each. While the nominal speed of the propulsion motors was 115 rpm, full power was available at all revolution speeds between 110 and 150 rpm. The four-blade propellers were of fixed pitch type with the centerline propeller, which had twice the propulsion power of the wing shafts, having greater diameter than the port and starboard propellers. The icebreaker had a single centerline rudder.

With an overall propulsion power of 22,000 hp, Moskva was at the time the most powerful diesel-electric icebreaker in the world. She was second only to the nuclear-powered Lenin which, at 44,000 hp, had twice the power of the Moskva-class icebreakers. While the most powerful western icebreaker at the time, the 1955-built USS Glacier, had two propulsion motors rated at 10,500 hp each and was thus nearly as powerful as Moskva, the American icebreaker could only maintain the peak 21,000 hp in four-hour increments and was rated for 16,900 hp in continuous operation.
