= List of ships built at Hietalahti shipyard (1–200) =

This is the list of ships built at Hietalahti shipyard in Helsinki, Finland, from the beginning until yard number 200. The list is incomplete due to missing archives from the early years (1865–1884).

Ship name(s) (Note: The romanization of Russian names may not be consistent.)	Year	Type (as built)	Yard number	IMO number	Status	Notes	Image	Ref
Tähti	1873	Steamboat				15 ihp steam engine		
	1878	Steamboat				Four 20-metre (65 ft) steamboats with wooden hull.		
	1879	Hopper barge				Four 100-foot (30 m) hopper barges for dredging the St. Petersburg—Kronstadt shipping channel.		
	1879	Steamship				This 40-foot (12 m) steamship with a 5 ihp steam engine was said to be the first iron-hulled vessel built at Hietalahti shipyard.		
	1880							
Ellida	1880	Steamboat						
	1882	Steamboat				Similar as Ellida and built for the same owner.		
Björn	1882	Tugboat						
	1884	Tugboat				100 ihp steam engine		
Werkkomatala (1884–1933); MKH 4 (1933–1955)	1884	Lightship	67		Broken up	The lightship Werkkomatala was stationed at the Verkkomatala shallows in Koivistonsalmi, between present-day Beryozovye Islands and Primorsk, in the region later ceded to the Soviet Union. After becoming obsolete in 1933, the lightship was stripped and converted into accommodation ship MKH 4. While being towed from Vaasa to Kristinestad on 20 May 1954, the vessel hit a rock and sank near the island of Bergö. She was raised shortly afterwards, but left on the shore until 1955 when she was towed to Turku for scrapping.		
Mäyly (1884–1906); Nahkiainen (1906–1956)	1884	Lightship	68		Broken up	Initially stationed off Kemi, Mäyly was moved to the Etelänahkiainen shallows off Raahe and renamed Nahkiainen in 1906. She remained in this location until 1956 when the new lighthouse was built to replace her. Afterwards, she served as a storage barge for the Finnish Board of Navigation until the 1970s. After her superstructure was demolished, she was used to transport sand for a few years before being broken up in Hamina.		
Relandersgrund (1884–??); Quarken (??–1920s); Snipan (1920s–1944)	1885	Lightship	69		Lost	This iron-hulled lightship, delivered as Relandersgrund but later renamed Quarken, was the second lightship to bear the latter name. She was stationed at Snipan shallows in Kvarken. Later, the ship became known by this name and she was officially renamed Snipan in the late 1920s. In December 1944, while heading for Vaasa for drydocking, the vessel ran aground in a snowstorm and sank.		
Helsingkallan (1885–1933); Varamajakka I (1933–1945); Snipan (1945–present?)	1885	Lightship	70		Lost	Helsingkallan was stationed in the Bothnian Bay, at shallows after which she had been named. In 1933, she was replaced by a light buoy and renamed Varamajakka I (Reserve light I). In 1945, she replaced her identical sister vessel Snipan that had sunk in December 1944 and given her name. Snipan was finally decommissioned in 1960 after the Utgrynnan lighthouse was built. After decommissioning, the old lightship was sold to a private owner who converted her into a trawler. Later, she was rebuilt as a pleasure boat. As of 2014, she remains partially submerged in near the island of Luonnonmaa in Naantali.		
Kolja		Steamship	71					
Hoppet		Steamship	72					
Nadeschda		Salvage ship	73					
Toivo		Steamship	74					
Konsul Addens		Steamship	75					
	1878	Steamship	82					
	1878	Steamship	83					
Lilla Björn	1880	Steamboat	87					
Frithiof	1881	Steamboat	88					
Björn	1882	Steamboat	89					
Walamo	1882	Steamboat	90					
Kung Ring	1885	Steamboat	91					
Ingeborg		Steamboat	92					
Odin	1884	Steamboat	93					
Herkules	1884		94					
Madame Angot (1884–1926); Aulanko (1926–1941); Heikki (1941–1950s?)	1884	Steamboat	95			Madame Angot was built as a steam-powered pleasure boat for Hugo Standerskjöld, the owner of the Karlberg manor in Hämeenlinna. In 1926, the vessel was purchased by its operator and renamed Aulanko. She was inspected as a tugboat and renamed Heikki in 1941. She remained in service in the 1950s, after which she was converted to a fishing boat. Her subsequent history is unknown.		
Wanda	1884	Steamboat	96					
Undine	1884	Steamboat	97					
Delphine	1884	Steamboat	98					
	1887	Sounding boat	99					
		Sounding boat	100					
		Sounding boat	101					
	1887	Sounding boat	102					
	1887–1888	Steamboat	103					
		Steamboat	104					
		Steamboat	105					
		Steamboat	106					
Willinge	1888–1889	Steamboat	107					
Atomen	1888	Steamboat	108					
Stern	1887–1888	Steamboat	109					
Onerva	1888	Wooden barge	110					
Aallotar	1888	Steamboat	111					
Ikalinen	1889	Steamboat	112					
Ilo	1889	Steamboat	113					
Ilmola	1889	Steamboat	114					
Lainetar	1889	Steamboat	115			Converted to a tugboat and later barge in the late 1910s.		
Uranus	1889	Steamboat	116					
Söder	1888–1889	Steamboat	117					
Olga	1890	Steamboat	118					
Väkevä	1890	Steamboat	119					
Aili	1891	Steamboat	120					
Balder	1891	Steamboat	121					
Dockan	1891	Steamboat	122					
Karma	1891	Motorboat	123					
Elsa	1892	Steamboat	126			Elsa changed hands several times in 1892–1910. Her subsequent fate unknown.		
Fiskars (1892–1901); Fiskars I (1901–1945); Ahti (1945–1953); Saitta (1953–1960); Liitto (1960–1972); Ahti (1972–present)	1892	Tugboat	127		In service	Fiskars was originally built for a Finnish company with the same name. When the company ordered a new tugboat in 1901, the old tugboat was renamed Fiskars I. During the Second World War, she was used as a supply and transport boat by the Finnish Navy. Later, Fiskars I changed hands several times and was renamed first to Ahti, then Saita and finally Liitto. When she was sold to a private owner and removed from the commercial vessel registry in 1972, Liitto was the last steam-powered tugboat in commercial service in the Vuoksi River. She was given back her old name, Ahti. With the exception of the 1885-built Helsingkallan, which is today a wreck, Ahti is the oldest vessel built in Hietalahti shipyard that is known to be still in existence.		
Sibbo	1892	Passenger ship	128					
Kotlin	1893	Tugboat	129		Broken up	Kotlin was converted into a salvage vessel in 1930 and scrapped after the war.		
Bomba (1894–1918); Santahamina (1918–1938); Santtu (1938–present)	1894	Passenger ship	130		In service	Built as a passenger ship, Bomba was sold to the Imperial Russian Navy in 1918 as a transport vessel. She was confiscated by the newly independent Finland in 1918, handed over to the Finnish Navy and renamed Santahamina. In the late 1920, she was sold to a private company. After changing hands again, she was rebuilt as a tugboat in 1938 and renamed Santtu. Re-engined with a diesel engine in 1948 and again in the late 1950s, Santtu has been a museum ship owned by the city of Pori since 1982.		
Pellinge (1896–??); Utra (??–1907); Pielavesi (1907–1928); Matti (1928–1942); Repola 5 (1942–1987); P. Roitto (1987–1994); Repola 5 (1994–present)	1896	Steamboat	131		In service	The vessel, originally a passenger ship but later converted to a tugboat, has been in private ownership as a pleasure craft since 1987.		
Taimi	1896	Steamboat	132					
Olavi	1897	Steamboat	133					
Rudnik	1897	Tugboat	134					
Serjoscha	1897	Tugboat	135					
Vanaja	1897	Tugboat	136					
Franz Scholtz	1898	Tugboat	137					
Vasama	1899	Tugboat	138					
Nylandska Skärgården	1899	Passenger ship	139					
Protector (1899–1960)	1899	Salvage ship	140		Broken up	Protector was a steam-powered salvage ship owned by the Finnish salvage company Neptun Oy. She was taken into service by the Imperial Russian Navy in 1914 and mobilized in 1916. When the Russians left the vessel in Helsinki on 13 April 1918, she was returned to her owner. Protector was rebuilt and lengthened in 1921, and broken up in Teijo, Finland, in 1960.		
Högholmen	1899–1901	Ferry	141					
Tyko	1899–1901	Tugboat	142					
Julia	1899–1901	Steamboat	143					
Västra Skärgården	1900–1901	Passenger ship	144					
Ponga	1900–1901	Tugboat	145					
Sandels	1901	Passenger ship	146		Broken up	Sandels's original steam engine replaced with a diesel engine in 1950. She was later converted to a barge and removed from registry in 1972.		
Martha	1900–1901	Tugboat	147					
Tricken	1900–1901	Tugboat	148					
Fiskars II	1900–1901	Tugboat	149					
Åland	1900–1901	Pilot boat	150					
Vodoley II	1902–1903	Water tanker	151		Lost	Vodoley II was scuttled in Port Arthur in 1904.		
Nautilus (1903–1981); Christina (1981–1992); Nikolai II (1992–present)	1902–1903	Fisheries patrol boat	152		In service	Nautilus was built as a fisheries research and inspection ship. She was decommissioned and sold to private interest in 1938. The vessel was re-engined with a diesel engine in 1981 and renamed Christina. Today, she carries passengers as Nikolai II.		
	1903	Water barge	153					
Georgipia	1903	Tugboat	154					
Windavetz	1903–1904	Tugboat	155					
Östra Skärgården	1903–1904	Passenger ship	156					
	1904	Garbage barge	157					
Bergö	1904	Stone barge	158					
Libava		Tugboat	159					
Emir Bukharskiy (1906–1919); Yakov Sverdlov (1919–1925)	1906	Destroyer	160		Broken up	Emir Bucharskiy was the first of four similar destroyers (classified as torpedo cruisers) built with public donations and named after the most lavish donors. Two vessels, Emir Bukharskiy and Finn, were built in Helsinki and two others in St. Petersburg. The vessel was named after the Emir of Bukhara, Abdul-Ahad bin Muzaffar al-Din, who donated a million rubles for expanding the navy. She participated in the First World War and was damaged by her own mine in Irbe Strait in 1915. She was transferred to Lake Ladoga and then to the Caspian Sea in 1918 and renamed Yakov Sverdlov in 1919. She was struck in 1923 and broken up in December 1925.		
Finn (1906–1919); Karl Liebknecht (1919–1925)	1906	Destroyer	161		Broken up	After the First World War, Finn was transferred to the Caspian Sea in 1918 and renamed Karl Liebknecht in 1919. She was struck and broken up in 1925.		
Strelka	1905–1906	Steamboat	162					
General Kondratenko (1906–1925)	1906	Destroyer	163		Broken up	General Kondratenko and Sibirskiy Strelok were 750-ton destroyers classified as a "torpedo cruiser". They were part of a class of four similar vessels built in Finland, two in Turku and two in Helsinki. General Kondratenko was stationed in the Baltic Sea during the First World War. She was struck in 1924 and scrapped in the following year.		
Sibirskiy Strelok (1906–1925); Konstruktor (1925–1956); OT-29 (1956–1957)	1906	Destroyer	164		Broken up	Sibirskiy Strelok was the fourth and last destroyer built in Helsinki for the Imperial Russian Navy. She participated in the First World War, during which she was hit twice by 150 mm shells from German cruisers. Unlike her sisters which were sunk or scrapped, Sibirskiy Strelok underwent refurbishment and disarming in 1923–1925 and became a tugboat named Konstruktor. After spending the Interwar period as a test platform for new weapon systems, she was refurbished as a patrol boat in August 1941. In November, she was hit by a 250 kg bomb from a Finnish or German aircraft. The explosion killed 200 crew and evacuees, and the vessel was grounded in the shallows. She was later further damaged by a storm that broke her in two. A replacement bow, some 5 metres (16 ft) shorter, was built and Konstruktor was transferred to the Ladoga Flotilla in April 1943. After the war, the ship was disarmed and used as an experimental vessel. In 1956, she was reclassified as a heating barge and renamed OT-29, only to be struck and scrapped in the following year.		
Vodoley III	1905–1906	Water tanker	165					
Haga	1905–1906	Steamboat	166					
Sunnan	1905–1906	Steam boat	167					
Tornea	1907	Customs boat	168					
Ustvajago	1907–1908	Steamboat	169					
Framnas	1907–1908	Steamboat	170					
Mary	1907–1908	Steamboat	171					
Regina	1907–1908	Passenger ship	172					
Tornea	1907–1908	Customs boat	173					
Mariehamn	1907–1908	Customs boat	174					
Nystad	1907–1908	Customs boat	175					
Kathe	1908	Tugboat	176					
Tuna	1908	Passenger boat	177					
Felix	1908–1909	Tugboat	178					
Merkurius	1908–1909	Customs boat	179					
	1909–1910	Dredging barge	180					
Sommarö I	1910	Passenger ship	181					
Mercator	1910	Icebreaker	182			The port icebreaker Mercator was the first icebreaking vessel built in Finland.		
Dockan	1910	Fishing boat	183					
Sigrid	1910–1911	Tugboat	184					
	1911	Pilot boat	185					
Esbo (1911–1913); Ahti (1913–1948); Saara (1948–present)	1911	Passenger ship	186		Renovation	The vessel was in passenger service as Esbo and Ahti until she was converted into a tugboat in 1947 and renamed Saara in the following year. She was sold in 1961, fitted with a hot bulb engine and converted into a pleasure craft. The current owners are planning to renovate the ship to its 1930s outfit.		
Stella	1911	Motor boat	187					
Aallotar (1911–1915); Allotore (1915–1918); Aallotar (1918–1970); Tarpon (1983–2017); Gahmberg (2017–present)	1911		188		In service	Aallotar was a 75-ton steam-powered coastal transport vessel that was used as a minesweeper by the Imperial Russian Navy in 1915–1918. During this time, her name was translitterated to Allotore. After Finland gained independence, she was given back her old name and handed over to the Finnish Customs. From 1930 on, she was used by the Finnish Border Guard. Aallotar was decommissioned in 1970 and sold to private owner in Sweden where she was rebuilt as a passenger ship. Her steam engine was replaced by a diesel engine in 1977 and she was renamed Tarpon in 1983. In charter service and as a floating office in Stockholm until late 2010s. Deckhouse remodeled in 2017 and renamed Gahmberg.		
Sommarö	1911	Passenger ship	189					
	1911	Customs boat	190					
	1911	Customs boat	191					
Maimax	1911	Tugboat	192					
Elisabet	1911	Salvage ship	194					
Machigir	1911	Tugboat	195					
Juno	1911–1912	Tugboat	196					
Helsingfors Skärgård (1912–1937); J.L. Runeberg (1937–present)	1912	Passenger ship	197	5166782	In service	Original steam engine replaced with a diesel engine in 1962.		
Nikolaj	1912	Cargo ship/tugboat	198					
Pionier	1912	Cargo ship/tugboat	199					
Suomenlinna	1912	Passenger ship	200					

== See also ==
- List of ships built at Hietalahti shipyard (201–400)
- List of ships built at Hietalahti shipyard (401 onwards)

== Bibliography ==
Haavikko, Paavo (1984). Wärtsilä 1834–1984. Oy Wärtsilä Ab. ISBN 951-99542-0-1.
