= Krasin (1976 icebreaker) =

Russian (formerly Soviet) icebreaker

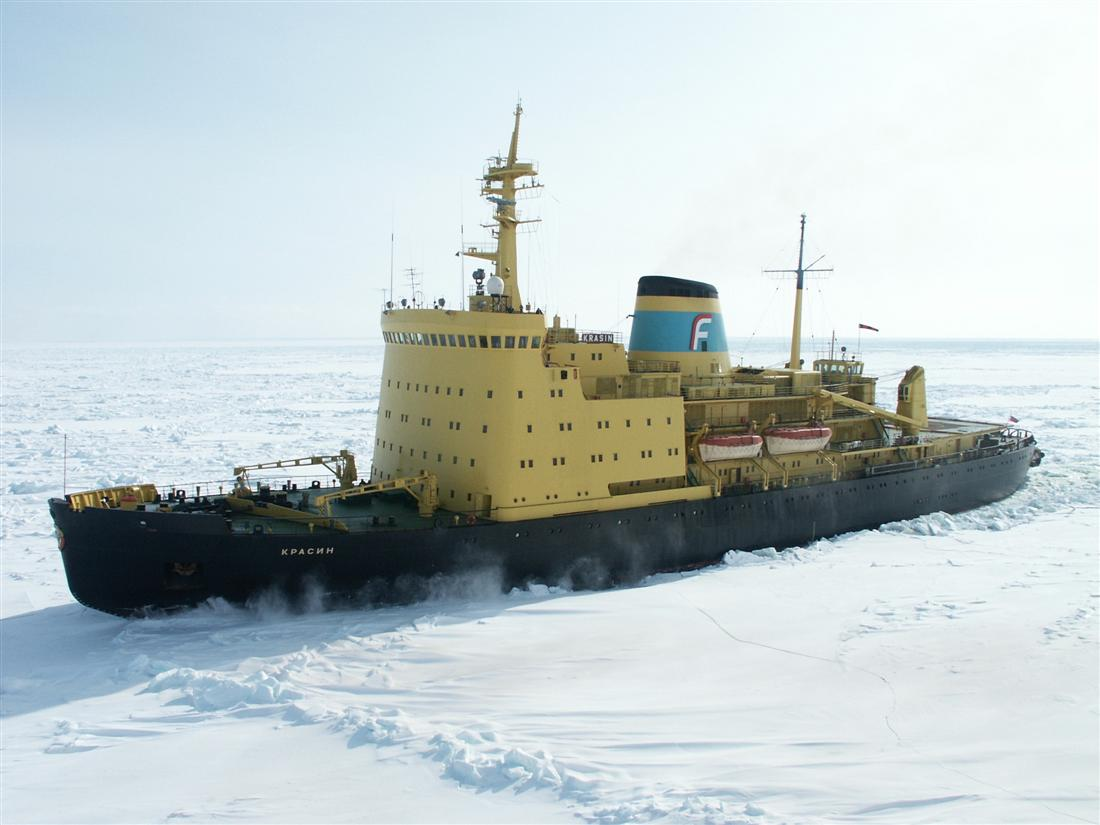
- NSF picture of Russian icebreaker Krasin on its way to McMurdo Sound, Antarctica

History

Russia
- Name: Krasin
- Namesake: Leonid Borisovich Krasin
- Owner: Far East Shipping Company (FESCO)
- Port of registry: Vladivostok, Russia
- Builder: Wärtsilä Helsinki Shipyard, Helsinki, Finland
- Yard number: 400
- Completed: 28 April 1976
- Identification: Call sign: UIFY; IMO number: 7359644; MMSI number: 273143900
- Status: In service

General characteristics
- Type: Icebreaker
- Tonnage: 14,508 GT; 4,217 NT; 7,554 DWT
- Displacement: 20,247 tons
- Length: 134.84 m (442.4 ft) (overall)
- Beam: 25.97 m (85.2 ft) (moulded); 26.05 m (85.5 ft) (max)
- Height: 45.60 m (149.6 ft) from keel
- Draft: 11.00 m (36.09 ft)
- Depth: 16.71 m (54.8 ft)
- Ice class: LL2
- Installed power: 9 × Wärtsilä-Sulzer 12ZH40/48 (9 × 3,385 kW)
- Propulsion: 3 × Strömberg DC motors (3 × 8,820 kW); Three fixed pitch propellers
- Speed: 20.30 knots (37.60 km/h; 23.36 mph) (max); 19.8 knots (36.7 km/h; 22.8 mph) (service); 2 knots (3.7 km/h; 2.3 mph) in 1.8 m (5.9 ft) level ice
- Aviation facilities: Helipad and hangar

The Krasin (Russian: Красин) is a Russian (formerly Soviet) icebreaker. The vessel operates in polar regions.

== History ==
The ship was built at the Wärtsilä Helsinki Shipyard in Helsinki, Finland in 1976. Named after an early Bolshevik leader and Soviet diplomat Leonid Krasin and an earlier icebreaker of the same name.

== Design ==
The second Krasin is a triple-screw diesel-powered icebreaker owned by the Far East Shipping Company (FESCO) and is based in Vladivostok. The hull has a friction-reducing coating.

Krasin can break ice 6 feet (2 m) thick.

== Service ==
During the 2004–2005 season (Operation Deep Freeze 2005), the United States Antarctic Program hired the Krasin as a secondary vessel to help clear a channel to McMurdo Station because the Coast Guard icebreaker Polar Star faced a record cut through fast ice of more than 90 miles (140 km). The Krasin departed Vladivostok on December 21, 2004, and arrived at the Ross Sea ice edge one month later.

The Krasin departed the Ross Sea on 9 February, reaching Vladivostok on March 5, 2005. She is unlikely to return to the Antarctic as FESCO have signed a multi-year contract for Krasin to support oil rig operations in the Sea of Okhotsk from March 2005 onwards. Along with her sister ship Admiral Makarov, Krasin has been providing winter escort to large capacity tankers from the port of De-Kastri (Khabarovsk) as part of the Sakhalin-I project. During the summer months she provides escort on the Northern Sea Route to the Eastern sector of Arctic servicing sea terminals of North Chukotka.

In September 2022, it was announced that Krasin's 1974-built sister ship Ermak would be dismantled for parts to keep the 1976-built icebreaker in service.
