= Alfred Angelo =

American bridal fashion house (1933–2017)

- Company type: Private
- Industry: Retailing
- Founded: 1933
- Defunct: July 14, 2017
- Fate: Stores closed due to Chapter 7 bankruptcy and liquidation.
- Headquarters: Delray Beach, Florida, USA
- Products: Clothing; wedding dresses; bridesmaids dresses; flower girl dresses; special occasion dresses; other formal wear
- Website: www.alfredangelo.com^{(Archived)}

Alfred Angelo Bridal was an American manufacturer and retailer of wedding gowns. The company was headquartered in Delray Beach, Florida. While primarily recognized for its bridal gowns, the firm also designed dresses for bridesmaids, mothers of the bride, flower girls, proms and special occasions, and sold wedding accessories.

In 2017, Alfred Angelo abruptly closed all its store locations and filed for Chapter 7 bankruptcy liquidation.

== History ==
The company was founded by Alfred Angelo and his wife Edythe Piccione in the mid-1930s in Philadelphia. Edythe designed the dresses and Alfred focused on manufacturing and business development. The company sold bridal and formal attire through its name-brand stores and in partner stores.

In the 1980s, the founder's children began managing the company. Dresses were marketed by style and price under the labels Alfred Angelo, Sapphire, Modern Vintage, and Disney Fairy Tale collections.

The company was featured on a 2013 episode of the television show Undercover Boss.

=== Bankruptcy ===
On July 13, 2017, the company filed for Chapter 7 bankruptcy liquidation and immediately closed all its stores. One year later, the case was still in court administration with US$20 million in claims from store customers. Much of the inventory was lost to warehouse and shippers' liens. In 2019, the company's total liabilities were reported at $78 million and only $245,000 was raised from a warehouse sale. The intellectual property of the Alfred Angelo labels was bought by a Shanghai-based online retailer.

== See also ==
- Retail apocalypse
- List of retailers affected by the retail apocalypse
