= Admiral Makarov (icebreaker) =

Russian icebreaker

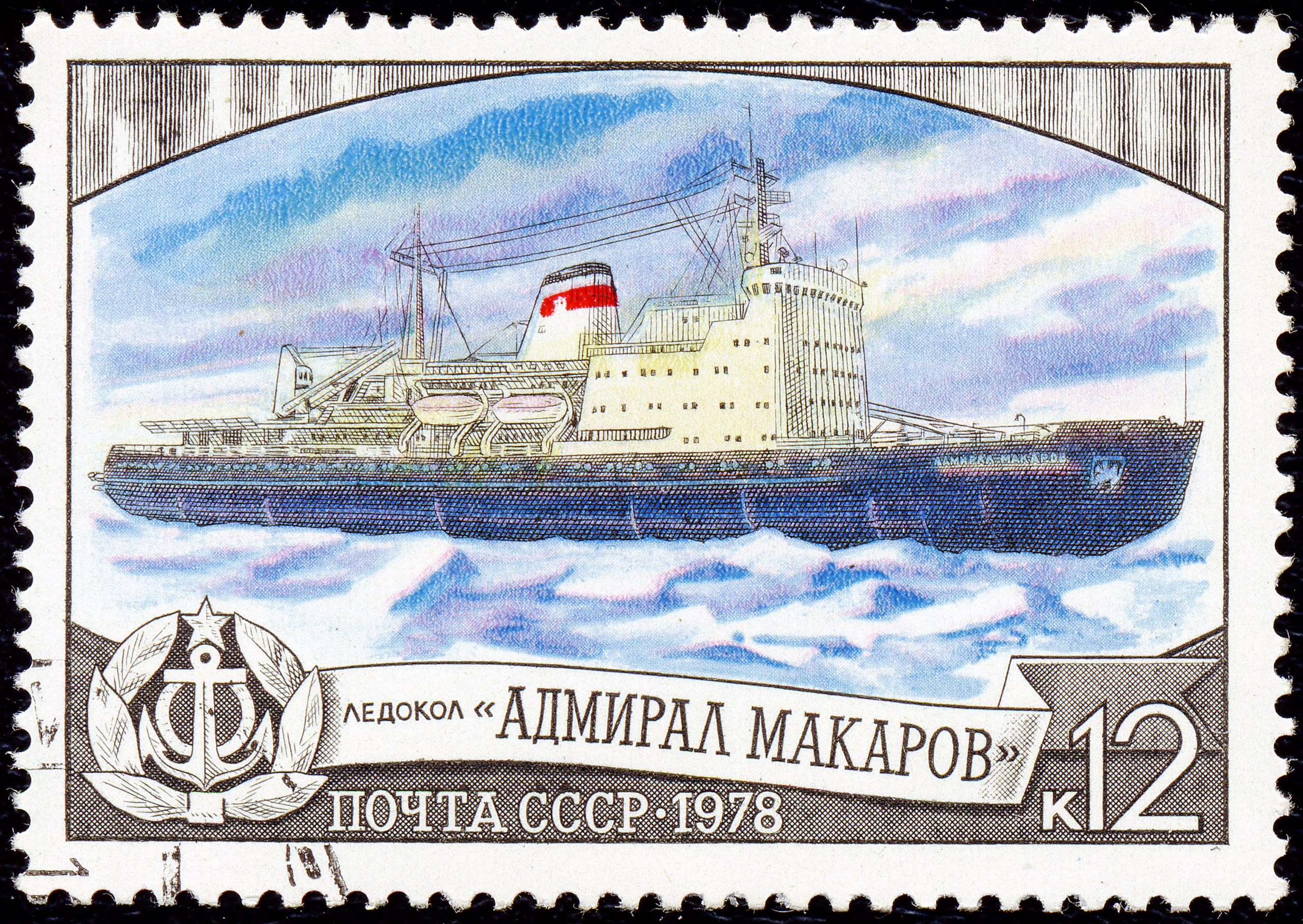

History

Russia
- Name: Admiral Makarov
- Namesake: Admiral Stepan Makarov
- Owner: Far East Shipping Company
- Port of registry: Vladivostok, Russia
- Builder: Wärtsilä Helsinki Shipyard, Helsinki, Finland
- Yard number: 399
- Completed: 12 June 1975
- Identification: Call sign: UGSN; IMO number: 7347603; MMSI number: 273148110
- Status: In service

General characteristics
- Class & type: Icebreaker
- Tonnage: 14,058 GT; 4,217 NT; 7,560 DWT
- Displacement: 20,247 tons
- Length: 134.84 m (442.4 ft) (overall)
- Beam: 25.97 m (85.2 ft) (moulded); 26.05 m (85.5 ft) (max)
- Height: 45.60 m (149.6 ft) from keel
- Draft: 11.00 m (36.09 ft)
- Depth: 16.71 m (54.8 ft)
- Ice class: LL2
- Installed power: 9 × Wärtsilä-Sulzer 12ZH40/48 (9 × 3,383 kW)
- Propulsion: 3 × Strömberg DC motors (3 × 8,820 kW); Three fixed pitch propellers
- Speed: 20.30 knots (37.60 km/h; 23.36 mph) (max); 19.8 knots (36.7 km/h; 22.8 mph) (service); 2 knots (3.7 km/h; 2.3 mph) in 1.8 m (5.9 ft) level ice
- Aviation facilities: Helipad and hangar

Admiral Makarov (Адмирал Макаров) is a Russian icebreaker operated by the Far East Shipping Company (FESCO). Completed in 1975, she is FESCO's oldest icebreaker. Admiral Makarov and her sister ship Krasin (1976), are the largest of the four icebreakers in FESCO's fleet. She is named after the Imperial Russian Navy Admiral Stepan Makarov and was one of two icebreakers involved in Operation Breakthrough, an international effort to free three gray whales from pack ice in the Beaufort Sea near Point Barrow in the U.S. state of Alaska in 1988.

The ship is chartered out for scientific expeditions and used as a supplier ship.

== Layout ==
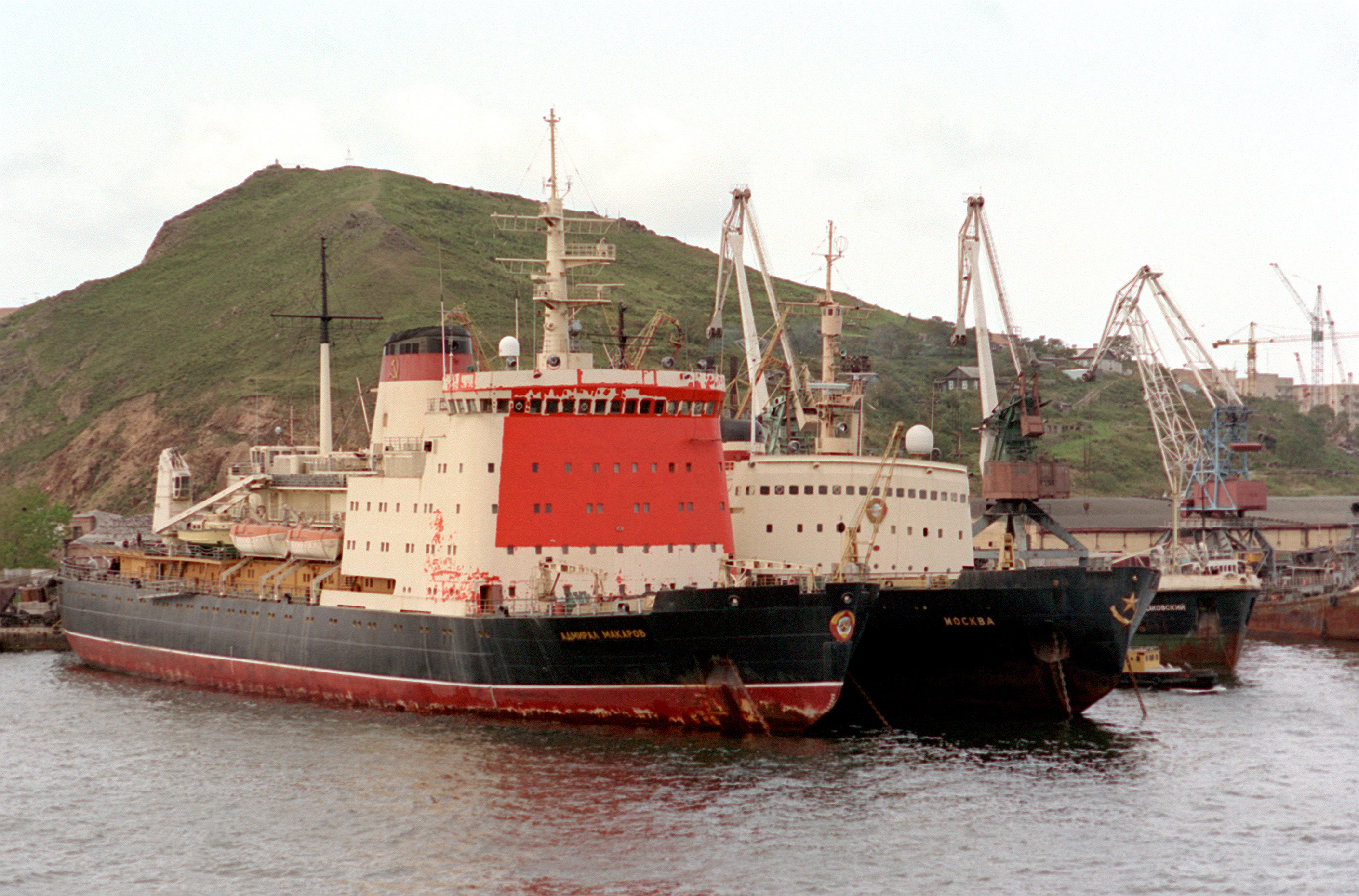
Admiral Makarov, 1992

Triple-screw, four-decker, with forecastle, poop, elongated superstructure, fore deckhouse, middle engine room, diesel-electric icebreaker with icebreaker bow and cruiser stern.

== Service ==
- 1988: Operation Breakthrough
- 2003-2006: in the Baltic Sea - escorting vessels to and from Primorsk;
- 2006 (10-year contract): in the Tatar Strait - with icebreaker Krasin, escorting large-capacity crude oil tankers to De-Kastri, in project Sakhalin-I.

== Maintenance and fire ==
She was in the yards since spring 2025 to repair extensive damage caused by its last shipyard fire in 2024, including work on its hull, propellers, three propeller shafts, and main engines. Engine repairs were scheduled to continue through the end of 2026. A fire broke out aboard and it took 2 hours to take it under control, with 52 firefighters and 10 pieces of equipment brought to the shipyard.
