= Commodore =

Commodore may refer to:

== Ranks ==
- Commodore (rank), a naval rank
  - Commodore (Royal Navy), in the United Kingdom
  - Commodore (India), in India
  - Commodore (United States)
  - Commodore (Canada)
  - Commodore (Finland)
  - Commodore (Germany) or Kommodore
- Air commodore, a rank in the Royal Air Force and other Commonwealth air forces
- Commodore (yacht club), an officer of a yacht club
- Commodore (Sea Scouts), a position in the Boy Scouts of America's Sea Scout program
- Convoy commodore, a civilian in charge of a shipping convoy during the Second World War

== Fiction ==
- The Commodore (Forester novel), a Horatio Hornblower novel by C. S. Forester
- The Commodore (O'Brian novel), a novel in the Aubrey–Maturin series by Patrick O'Brian

== Music and music venues ==
- Commodore Ballroom, a nightclub and music venue in Vancouver, British Columbia
- Commodore Records, a jazz and swing music record label
- Commodores, an American soul/funk band

== People ==
- "The Commodore", the nickname of American entrepreneur Cornelius Vanderbilt (1794–1877)
- "Commodore Kuehnle", the nickname of American entrepreneur and politician Louis Kuehnle (1857–1934)
- Aaron Commodore (1819/20 – 1892), African American politician
- Mike Commodore (born 1979), a Canadian ice hockey player
- Commodore P. Vedder (1838–1910), New York politician

== Places ==
- Commodore, Pennsylvania, United States
- Commodore Island, a Canadian island in Hudson Bay
- Phoenix Park Hotel, hotel built in Washington, D.C., in 1922, known originally as "The Commodore"

== Vehicles ==
=== Automobiles ===
- Hudson Commodore, an automobile produced from 1941 to 1952 in the US by Hudson Motor Car Company
- Opel Commodore, an automobile produced from 1967 to 1982 in Germany by Adam Opel AG
- Holden Commodore, an automobile produced from 1978 to 2017 in Australia by the Holden division of General Motors

=== Ships and boats ===
- Commodore (shipwreck), an American steamboat shipwrecked off the coast of Florida
- Commodore 17, an American sailboat design
- USS Commodore, the name of various United States Navy ships

=== Aircraft ===
- Consolidated Commodore, a flying boat used for passenger travel in the 1930s

== Computers ==
- Commodore International (also named Commodore Business Machines), a computer company that operated from 1954 to 1994
  - Commodore 64, an 8-bit home computer introduced in January 1982 by Commodore International
- Commodore USA, a computer company that operated from 2010 to 2013 after purchasing the classic brand name

== Other uses ==
- Several genera or species of brush-footed butterflies, in particular:
  - Precis
  - Auzakia danava
  - Junonia artaxia
- Vanderbilt Commodores, intercollegiate athletics teams for Vanderbilt University
