= Operation Beowulf =

1941 military operation in Estonia during WWII

Coordinates: 58.5000°N 23.0000°E

- Part of World War II and the Eastern Front (World War II)
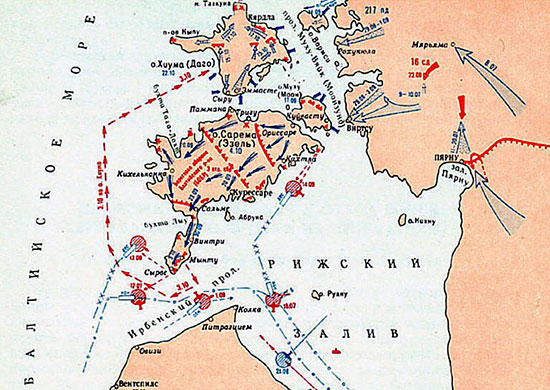
- Defense of the Moonsund Islands 22 June - 22 October 1941
Date	9 September – 21 October 1941
Location	Saaremaa, Hiiumaa, and Muhu (Estonia)
Result	German victory

Belligerents
Germany	Soviet Union

Commanders and leaders
(Nazi Germany) Georg von Küchler	(Soviet Union) Nikolay Kuznetsov

Units involved
61st Infantry Division	3rd Infantry Brigade of the North-Western Front

Strength
10,000	23,700

Casualties and losses
2,850 killed, missing, or wounded	4,700 killed 19,000 captured

Operation Beowulf refers to two German plans to occupy the islands of Saaremaa, Hiiumaa and Muhu, off the Estonian west coast. Both plans had the same objectives but assumed differing start points. The attack, using Beowulf II, started on 9 September 1941 and had achieved its objectives by 21 October.

== Beowulf I ==
This version assumed a rapid German victory in the Baltic States. It would have been a re-working of Operation Albion, launched from Courland in Latvia. In the event, German forces were delayed as they crossed into Estonian territory.

== Beowulf II ==
This version, which was executed, was an attack from the Estonian west coast. There were a series of diversionary attacks to confuse the Soviet defenders – Südwind, Westwind and Nordwind. The islands were garrisoned by 23,700 Soviet troops of the 3rd Rifle Brigade. The German force allocated to the operation was the 61st Infantry Division which was reinforced with additional assault pioneers and artillery. The force was transported from the Estonian coast by a fleet of about 100 barges and ferries together with 150 smaller assault boats. A joint German and Finnish naval task force had been assembled to cover the landings, which included the light cruisers Emden, Köln and Leipzig. During diversionary naval bombardments, on 13 September, the large Finnish coastal defence ship Ilmarinen sank when she struck a mine off Hanko.

As a preliminary, the small island of Vormsi was taken on 9 September. On 14 September, the main assault commenced with a landing on Muhu, which is connected to the larger island of Saaremaa (German: Ösel) by a causeway. Muhu was secured by 16 September and a bridgehead across the causeway was established on the following day. By 23 September, the Soviet garrison had been pushed back to the heavily fortified Sorve Peninsula; they were gradually forced from their defences by the assault pioneers assisted by naval gunfire support and the last Soviet troops surrendered on 5 October. The assault on the island of Hiiumaa (German: Dagö) commenced on 12 September; the defenders were forced back to the Takhuna Peninsula, where the survivors finally surrendered on 21 October 1941. Due to local Axis naval and air superiority, none of the Soviet defenders were able to escape; their losses amounted to 4,700 killed and 19,000 captured. German casualties totalled 2,850.
