= Operation Northwind (1941) =

1941 war warfare operation in the Baltic Sea

Operation North Wind (German: Unternehmen Nordwind) was a joint German-Finnish naval operation in the Baltic Sea in 1941, in the course of World War II. The operation itself was a distracting manoeuvre so that another German force could occupy the Estonian islands of Hiiumaa, Saaremaa and Muhu (codenamed Operation Beowulf) without the interference of the Soviet Red Fleet.

The operation suffered a major setback when the Finnish coastal defence ship Ilmarinen ran into a minefield and sank. It is uncertain if the Soviets ever noticed the fleet as they never responded.

== See also ==
- Operation Barbarossa
- Army Group North
- Kriegsmarine
- Baltic Sea Campaigns (1939-1945)
