= Haudaudine =

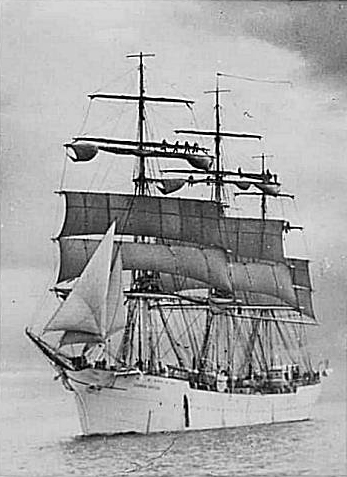
- Suomen Joutsen, the sister ship of Haudaudine.

History

Flag of France
- Name: Haudaudine
- Namesake: Pierre Haudaudine
- Owner: Société Anonyme des Armateurs Nantais
- Port of registry: Saint-Nazaire, France
- Builder: Chantiers de Penhoët, Saint-Nazaire, France
- Launched: 18 September 1902
- In service: 1902–1905
- Fate: Foundered off New Caledonia in 1905

General characteristics
- Type: Full-rigged ship
- Tonnage: 2,393 GRT; 1,734 NRT; 3,100 DWT
- Length: 96 m (315 ft)
- Beam: 12.26 m (40 ft 3 in)
- Draft: 6.35 m (20 ft 10 in)
- Depth: 7.29 m (23 ft 11 in)
- Sail plan: Three masts, all square rigged; sail area 2,807 m^{2} (30,210 sq ft)
- Crew: 25

Haudaudine was a French full-rigged ship owned by Société Anonyme des Armateurs Nantais. Built by Chantiers de Penhoët in Saint-Nazaire in 1902 and named after Pierre Haudaudine, she ran aground off New Caledonia on 3 January 1905 and sank shortly after the crew had abandoned the ship.

Haudaudine was the sister ship of Suomen Joutsen, the former school ship of the Finnish Navy, which is today a museum ship in Turku, Finland.

== Description ==
In 1902, the French shipping company Société Anonyme des Armateurs Nantais ordered two 3,100-ton full-rigged ships from Chantiers de Penhoët in Saint-Nazaire. The first ship was launched on 7 August 1902 and christened Laënnec after the French doctor René Laennec. She was followed by Haudaudine, which was launched on 18 September 1902 and named after an 18th-century French merchant and politician from Nantes, Pierre Haudaudine.

The steel-hulled Haudaudine was 96 metres (315 ft) long overall, had a beam of 12.26 metres (40 ft 3 in) at midship and drew 6.35 metres (20 ft 10 in) of water when fully laden. Her tonnage was 2,393 register tons gross, 1,734 register tons net and 3,100 tons deadweight. The sail area of the three-masted, full-rigged Haudaudine was 2,807 square metres (30,210 sq ft). She had a crew of 25.

== Final voyage ==
Haudaudine left Koné, New Caledonia, on 3 January 1905. She had arrived earlier from Yokohama, Japan, in ballast and was loaded for her homeward voyage with 3,042 tons of nickel ore from the Katavite mines bound for Rotterdam, Germany. After having been towed clear of the reefs by tugboat SS St. Pierre, she set sail in a fresh breeze. However, at sunset the wind died out and the strong currents began pushing Haudaudine towards the Contrariété Reef between Cape Goulvain and Porondu Island. Powerless to stop the ship or alter the course, the captain ordered soundings to be taken every few minutes to determine the water depth.

When the bow of Haudaudine collided with the coral reef, the ship swerved around and her stern hit the reef several times, flooding the aft compartments. Within three hours the stern had settled down and the captain gave an order to abandon ship for the crew of 25 and three passengers. After the lifeboats had been launched, Haudaudine heeled to port, capsized and sank on the reef with seven feet of water over the starboard side. The lifeboats reached Port Moneo and Bourail in the following morning.

Haudaudine was a total loss and storms eventually broke her up on the reef. Some remains, such as the auxiliary boilers, are still visible on the reef. Her helm has been restored and put on display in the New Caledonia Maritime History Museum.
