= Commodore (rank) =

Naval officer rank

Commodore is a senior naval rank used in many navies which is equivalent to brigadier or brigadier general and air commodore. It is superior to a navy captain, but below a rear admiral. It either is regarded as the most junior of the flag officers rank or may not hold the jurisdiction of a flag officer at all depending on the officer's appointment. Non-English-speaking nations commonly use the rank of flotilla admiral, counter admiral, or senior captain as an equivalent, although counter admiral may also correspond to rear admiral lower half abbreviated as RDML.

Traditionally, "commodore" is the title for any officer assigned to command more than one ship, even temporarily, much as "captain" is the traditional title for the commanding officer of a single ship even if the officer's official title in the service is a lower rank. As an official rank, a commodore typically commands a flotilla or squadron of ships as part of a larger task force or naval fleet commanded by an admiral. A commodore's ship is typically designated by the flying of a broad pennant, as compared to an admiral's flag.

"Commodore" is typically regarded as a one-star rank with a NATO code of OF-6, known in the U.S. as "rear admiral (lower half)", but whether it is regarded as a flag rank varies among countries.

It is sometimes abbreviated as "Cdre" in British Royal Navy, "CDRE" in the US Navy, "Cmdre" in the Royal Canadian Navy, "COMO" in the Spanish Navy and in some navies speaking the Spanish language, or "CMDE" as used in the Indian Navy and in navies of several other countries.

== Etymology ==
The rank of commodore derives from the French commandeur, which was the second highest rank in the orders of knighthood, and in military orders the title of the knight in charge of a commandery.

== History ==
The Dutch Navy also used the rank of commandeur from the end of the 16th century for a variety of temporary positions, until it became a conventional permanent rank in 1955. The Royal Netherlands Air Force has adopted the English spelling of "commodore" for an equivalent rank.

In the Royal Navy, the position was introduced in the 17th century to combat the cost of appointing more admirals—a costly business with a fleet as large as the Royal Navy's at that time.

The rank of commodore was at first a position created as a temporary title to be bestowed upon captains who commanded squadrons of more than one vessel. In many navies, the rank of commodore was merely viewed as a senior captain position, whereas other naval services bestowed upon the rank of commodore the prestige of flag officer status.

=== United States ===
In 1899, the substantive rank of commodore was discontinued in the United States Navy, but revived during World War II in both the United States Navy and United States Coast Guard. It was discontinued as a rank in these services during the postwar period, but as an appointment, the title "commodore" was then used to identify senior U.S. Navy captains who commanded squadrons of more than one vessel or functional air wings or air groups that were not part of a carrier air wing or carrier air group. Concurrently, until the early 1980s, U.S. Navy and U.S. Coast Guard captains selected for promotion to the rank of rear admiral (lower half), would wear the same insignia as rear admiral (upper half), i.e., two silver stars for collar insignia or sleeve braid of one wide and one narrow gold stripe, even though they were actually only equivalent to one-star officers and paid at the one-star rate.

To correct this inequity, the rank of commodore as a single-star flag officer was reinstated by both services in the early 1980s. This immediately caused confusion with those senior U.S. Navy captains commanding destroyer squadrons, submarine squadrons, functional air wings and air groups, and so on, who held the temporary "title" of commodore while in their major command billet. As a result of this confusion, the services soon renamed the new one-star rank commodore admiral (CADM) within the first six months following the rank's reintroduction. However, this was considered an awkward title and the one-star flag rank was renamed a few months later, giving it its current title of rear admiral (lower half), later abbreviated by the U.S. Navy and U.S. Coast Guard as RDML. The United States Public Health Service Commissioned Corps, and NOAA Commissioned Corps, whose rank structures follow the naval pattern, also use this title and abbreviation.

The "title" of commodore continues to be used in the U.S. Navy and U.S. Coast Guard for those senior captains in command of organizations consisting of groups of ships or submarines organized into squadrons; air wings or air groups of multiple aviation squadrons other than carrier air wings (the latter whose commanders still use the title "CAG"); explosive ordnance disposal (EOD), mine warfare and special warfare (SEAL) groups; Mobile Inshore Underwater Warfare (MIUW) groups; and construction (SeaBee) regiments. Although not flag officers, modern day commodores in the U.S. Navy rate a blue and white command pennant, also known as a broad pennant, that is normally flown at their headquarters facilities ashore or from ships that they are embarked aboard when they are the Senior Officer Present Afloat (SOPA).

=== Argentina ===
In the Argentine Navy, the position of commodore was created in the late 1990s, and is usually, but not always, issued to senior captains holding rear-admirals' positions. It is not a rank but a distinction and, as such, can be issued by the chief of staff without congressional approval. Its equivalents are colonel-major in the Army and commodore-major in the Air Force. It is usually—but incorrectly—referred to as "navy commodore", to avoid confusion with the "air force commodore", which is equivalent to the navy's captain and army's colonel. The sleeve lace is identical to that of the Royal Navy, and wears one star on the epaulette.

== Naval rank ==
- Commodore (Canada)
- Commodore (Finland)
- Commodore (India)
- Commodore (Sri Lanka)
- Commodore (Royal Navy)
- Commodore (United States)
- Commodore (Pakistan)
- Kommodore

=== Gallery ===
Comodoro de marina
(Argentine Navy)

Commodore
(Royal Australian Navy)

Commodore
(Royal Bahamas Defence Force)

Commodore
(Bangladesh Navy)

Commodore
(Barbados Coast Guard)

Commodore
French: Commodore
(Royal Canadian Navy)

Comodoro
(Chilean Navy)

Komodor
(Croatian Navy)

Kommodoor
(Estonian Navy)

ኮሞዶር
Komodori
(Ethiopian Navy)

Commodore
(Republic of Fiji Navy)

Kommodori
Swedish: Kommodor
(Finnish Navy)

Commodore
(Gambian Navy)

Commodore
(Ghana Navy)

Commodore
(Guyana Coast Guard)

Commodore
Hindi: कमोडोर, romanized: Kamodor
(Indian Navy)

Commodore
(Irish: Ceannasóir)
(Irish Naval Service)

Commodore
(Jamaican Coast Guard)

Komodor
(Montenegrin Navy)

Commodore
(Royal New Zealand Navy)

Commodore
(Nigerian Navy)

Commodore
Urdu: کموڈور, romanized: Commodore
(Pakistan Navy)

Commodore
(Papua New Guinea Maritime Element)

Commodore
(Philippine Navy)

Comodoro
(Portuguese Navy)

Комодор
Komodor
(Serbian River Flotilla)

Commodore
(Sierra Leone Navy)

Commodore
(Sri Lanka Navy)

Commodore
(Tanzania Naval Command)

Commodore
(Tongan Maritime Force)

Commodore
(Trinidad and Tobago Coast Guard)

Коммодор
Kommodor
(Ukrainian Navy)

Commodore
(Royal Navy)

== Air force ranks ==
Commodore, in Spanish comodoro, is a rank in the Argentine Air Force. This rank is the equivalent of a colonel in the Argentine Army, and a colonel or group captain in other air forces of the world. The Argentine rank below commodore is the rank of vice-commodore (Spanish vicecomodoro) equivalent to a lieutenant-colonel in the Argentine Army, and a lieutenant-colonel or wing commander in other air forces.

Commodore is a rank in the Royal Netherlands Air Force. It is a one-star rank and has essentially the same rank insignia as the British air commodore.

Many air forces use the rank of air commodore. This rank was first used by the Royal Air Force and is now used in many countries such as Australia, Bangladesh, Greece, India, New Zealand, Nigeria, Pakistan, Thailand and Zimbabwe. It is the equivalent rank to the navy rank of "commodore", and the army ranks of brigadier and brigadier general.

The German air force used the concept of a unit commodore for the commander of a wing, usually in the rank of colonel (OF-5).

== Merchant Service (Merchant Marine) rank and Yacht Club chief directors ==
Commodore is also a title held by many captains as recognition of exceptional navigation ability and seagoing seniority in the Merchant Service, and by the directors of a few yacht clubs and boating associations. Commodores 'in command' as Master aboard Merchant Marine ships wear distinctive rank and cap insignia denoting their honorific high rank position. In a few country the honorific high position of commodore it is indicated with the high rank denomination of senior captain. Traditionally, commodore is the title of the president of a yacht club.

== Convoy commodore ==
During wartime, a shipping convoy will have a ranking officer—sometimes an active-duty naval officer, at other times a civilian master or retired naval officer—designated as the convoy commodore. This title is not related to the individual's military rank (if any), but instead is the title of the senior individual responsible for the overall operation of the merchant ships and naval auxiliary ships that make up the convoy. The convoy commodore does not command the convoy' escort forces (if any), which are commanded by a naval officer who serves as escort commander.

== Civilian use ==
=== Commodore in Yachting Leadership ===
Civilian yacht clubs, yachting associations and fellowships with formal hierarchical structures, began to use the title "commodore" in countries around the world for their presidents in the early twentieth century along with "vice commodore" in the same manner as "vice president,"and "rear-commodore" and "port captain' or "international bridge member" in the same manner as board members.

Commodores, vice-commodores and rear-commodores are also known as civilian flag officers because they have an epaulettes, regalia and maritime flags with designated symbols and number of stars for their ranks. Many of the clubs that are more than a century old, such as the Los Angeles Yacht Club have formal ceremonies, where commodores from more than 100 surrounding yacht clubs, flag officers of the US Navy and Coast Guard attend a ceremony at the beginning of the year. The ceremony includes a bagpipe entrance, a presentation of the country flag by commissioned officers of the country's navy and a cannon shot upon the raising of each individual officer's flags on a flag staff, (also known as flagpoles) for each flag officer (commodore, vice commodore, rear commodore) as their term of office officially begins. Sometimes a trumpet fanfare is also include for special occasions like ribbon cutting in 2019 for the 50th Transpacific Yacht Race. Salutes are given to commodores for special ceremonies, including opening days of the racing season.

== Other uses ==
The U.S. Coast Guard Auxiliary also employs variants of the title of commodore. Members of the Auxiliary serve in the Coast Guard's uniformed auxiliary service and they do not have military rank, but who do wear modified U.S. Coast Guard uniforms and U.S. military-style officer rank insignia to indicate office. Auxiliary members who have been elected or appointed to positions in the highest levels of the organization, similar in nature to active and reserve rear admirals and vice admirals use the term commodore (e.g., district commodore, assistant national commodore, deputy national commodore, national commodore, etc.). These Coast Guard auxiliarists may permanently append the title commodore, sometimes abbreviated COMO, to their names (e.g., Commodore James A. Smith, National Commodore; or COMO Jim Smith, (NACO)).

In the Philippine Coast Guard Auxiliary—PCGA—each of the directors in command of the ten Coast Guard Auxiliary districts are commodores, as well as most of the Deputy National Directors (some may be rear admirals). Commodore is abbreviated to COMMO in the PCGA.

Vanderbilt University's intercollegiate athletics teams are nicknamed the "Commodores", a reference to Cornelius Vanderbilt's self-appointed title (he was the master of a large shipping fleet).

In the U.S. Sea Scouting program (which is part of the Boy Scouts of America), all National, Regional, Area, and Council committee chairs are titled as commodore, while senior committee members are addressed as vice commodore. Ship committee chairs do not hold this recognition.

== See also ==
- Commodore-in-Chief
- Comparative military ranks
