= USS Commodore =

USS Commodore may refer to the following ships of the United States Navy:

- USS Commodore (1863), a side wheel steamer, was built at New Orleans, Louisiana, in 1863
- USS Commodore (IX-7), built in 1875 at Cleveland, Ohio
- USS Commodore (SP-1425), a motorboat, served in the Navy during 1917–1919
- USS Commodore (401B), a landlocked training ship used during World War II
