= Phoenix Park Hotel =

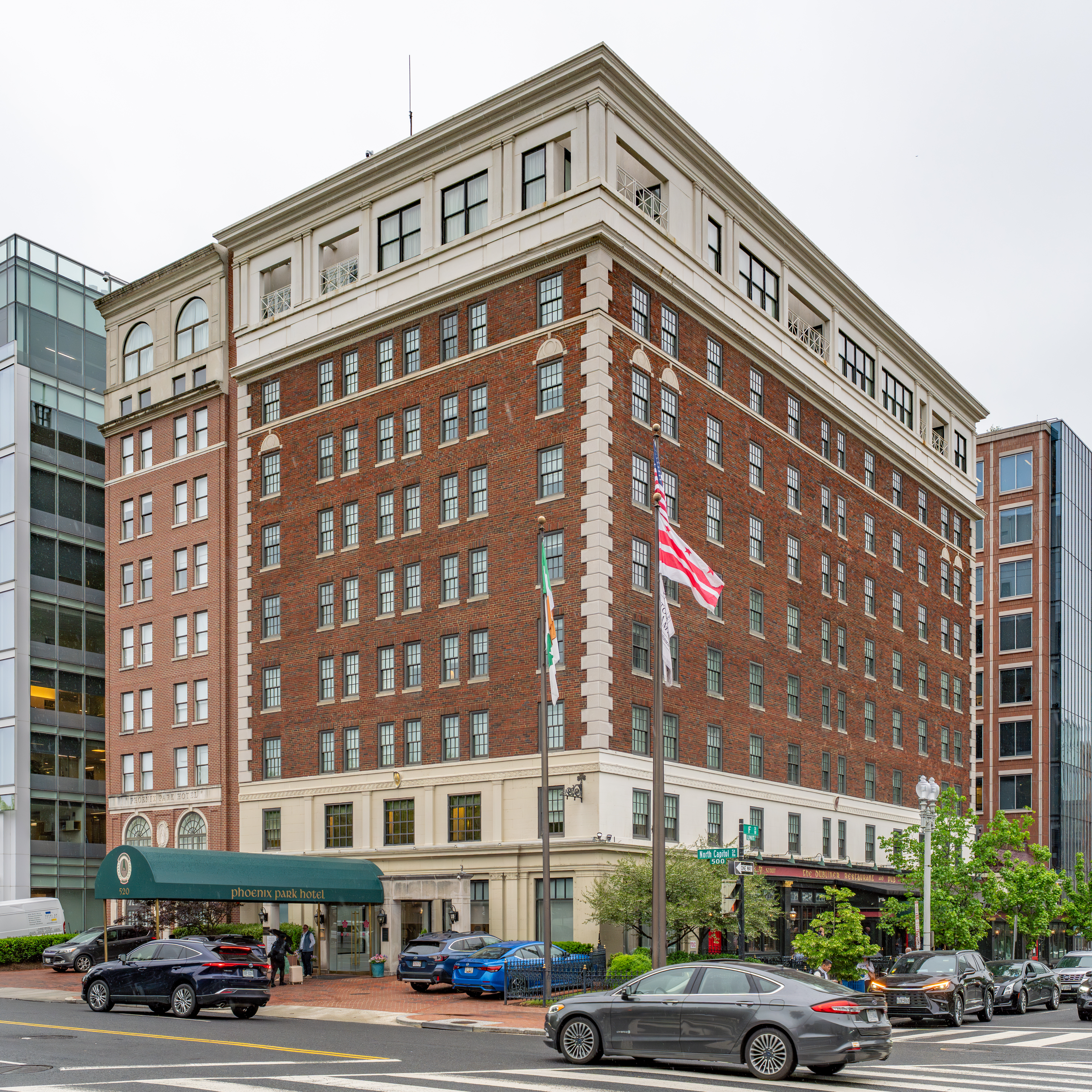
- Phoenix Park Hotel

- Location within Central Washington, D.C. Phoenix Park Hotel (the District of Columbia) Phoenix Park Hotel (the United States)
- Former names: Commodore

General information
- Location: Washington, D.C., 501 N. Capitol St.
- Coordinates: 38.897123°N 77.009499°W
- Completed: 1922
- Renovated: 2016

Phoenix Park Hotel (formerly the Commodore) is a hotel located in Washington, D.C. on North Capitol Street, at the corner of F St. NW and Massachusetts Avenue. The hotel is on Capitol Hill, close to the Capitol Building and Union Station.

It is a Georgian Revival-style hotel built in 1927 and originally known as The Commodore. It was bought in 1982 by Daniel J. Coleman and renamed after Dublin, Ireland's Phoenix Park. Its Irish themes include its toiletries and the Dubliner, Washington DC's oldest continually operating Irish bar. It has been a member of the Historic Hotels of America since 2002, and it was renovated in 2016.
