= Commodore Island =

Island in Nunavut, Canada

- Location within Nunavut Location within Canada

Geography
- Location: Hudson Bay
- Coordinates: 58°47′15″N 078°39′20″W
- Archipelago: Arctic Archipelago

Administration
- Canada
- Territory: Nunavut
- Region: Qikiqtaaluk

Demographics
- Population: Uninhabited

Commodore Island is a northern Canadian island in eastern Hudson Bay. While situated 1 km (0.62 mi) off the western coast of Quebec's Ungava Peninsula, it is a part of Qikiqtaaluk Region in the territory of Nunavut.
