= Finnish coastal defence ship Ilmarinen =

1931 Finnish Navy coastal defence ship

Coordinates: 59°27′N 21°05′E

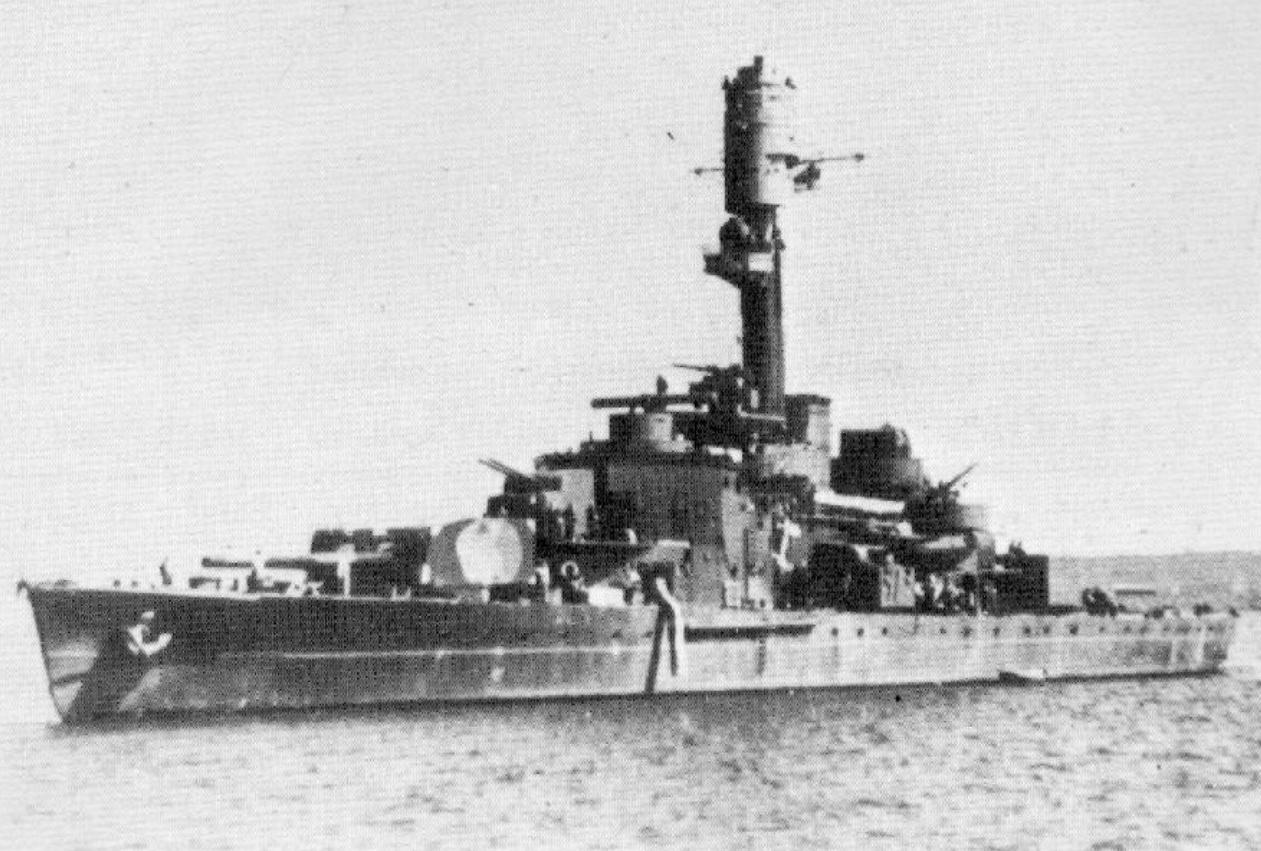
- Väinämöinen, sister ship to Ilmarinen

History

Finland
- Name: Ilmarinen
- Ordered: 1927
- Builder: Crichton-Vulcan Oy, Turku, Finland
- Laid down: September 1929
- Launched: 9 July 1931
- Commissioned: 17 April 1934
- Fate: Sunk by mines on 13 September 1941

General characteristics
- Class & type: Väinämöinen-class coastal defence ship
- Displacement: 3,900 long tons
- Length: 93.0 m (305.1 ft)
- Beam: 16.864 m (55.33 ft)
- Draught: 4.5 m (15 ft)
- Propulsion: Diesel-Electric powertrain; four Krupp engines 875 kW (1,173 hp), two shafts.; 3,500 kW (4,700 hp)
- Speed: 14.5 knots (26.9 km/h; 16.7 mph)
- Range: 700 nmi (1,300 km; 810 mi)
- Complement: 403 (11 September 1941)
- Armament: [design]; 4 × 254 mm (10 in)/45 cal Bofors guns (2 × 2); 8 × 105 mm (4 in)/50 cal Bofors DP guns (4 × 2); 4 × 40 mm/40 cal Vickers AA guns (4 × 1); 2 × 20 mm/60 cal Madsen AA guns (2 × 1); [1941]; 4 × 254 mm/45 cal Bofors guns (2 × 2); 8 × 105 mm/50 cal Bofors DP guns (4 × 2); 4 × 40 mm/56 cal Bofors AA M/36S guns (1 × 2, 2 × 1); 4 × 20 mm/60 cal Madsen AA guns (4 × 1)

Ilmarinen was a Finnish Navy Panssarilaiva, Swedish Pansarskepp ("Armored ship"; a coastal defence ship by British classification). The unit was constructed at the Crichton-Vulcan shipyard in Turku, Finland, and named after the mythological hero Ilmarinen from the Finnish national epic, the Kalevala. Ilmarinen was the flagship of the Navy from 1 May 1933 until her sinking on 13 September 1941.

== History ==
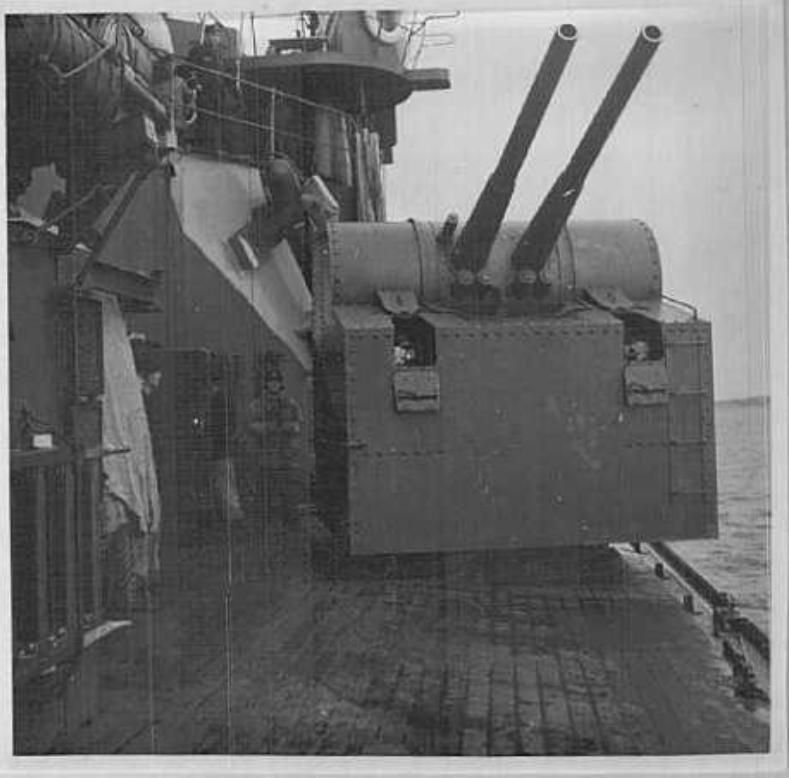
105 mm guns of a Väinämöinen-class coastal defence ship

During the early inter-war period the Finnish Navy consisted of some 30 ex-Russian vessels, most of them taken as war-trophies following the civil war. Never ideal types for the navy's needs, they were generally old and in poor condition. In 1925, a tragic incident highlighted the sorry state of the navy. An old torpedo boat was lost in a fierce storm, taking with her the entire crew of 53. A heated debate started, and intensive lobbying led to the adoption of a new Finnish Navy Act in 1927.

Prior to World War II, the fleet renewal program led to the acquisition or construction of five submarines, four torpedo boats, and two coastal defense ships. Among the last of their kind, Väinämöinen and Ilmarinen were two of the most concentrated naval artillery units ever built. They were designed by the Dutch company NV Ingenieurskantoor voor Scheepsbouw (a front for German interests circumventing the Treaty of Versailles), and were optimized for operations in the archipelagos of the Baltic Sea. Their open sea performance was de-emphasized in order to give the vessels their shallow draft and super-compact design.

Coastal defence ships were particularly popular in the Nordic countries, and began serving in the navies of Denmark, Sweden and Norway early in the 20th century. These vessels typically had heavy armament and good armor protection, but were relatively slow. Their sizes were around 4,000 tons, main armament consisted of guns between 210 and 240 mm (8 and 9 in), the armor corresponded to that of armoured cruisers, and speeds were between 15 and 18 knots (28 and 33 km/h; 17 and 21 mph). A coastal defence ship was somewhere between a cruiser and a monitor: slower than a cruiser but better armed, faster than a monitor, but with smaller guns. The coastal defence ships also varied among themselves; some of them were closer to cruisers, and others, such as the Finnish ones, were closer to monitors.

Being the second of her class, Ilmarinen was launched at the Turku shipyard on 9 September 1933. The ship went through its finishing trials and was handed over to the Finnish Navy on 17 April 1934. Her sister ship Väinämöinen had preceded her by two years.

The vessels had a compact design, with a high mast and large turrets for main and secondary artillery. Foreign comments on their design ranged from puns to praise. Not truly designed for open sea operations, the ships had a tendency to roll slowly and widely even in moderate seas. Travel on them was unpleasant, but deemed safe. Additional keels were later fitted, which improved the situation somewhat.

Väinämöinen and Ilmarinen had a displacement of 3,900 long tons, a maximum length of 93 metres (305 ft), and a draught of 4.50 metres (14.8 ft). Requirements of speed and range were moderate, as they were expected to operate near their home bases. Both vessels were equipped with four diesel engines that powered two electrical engines. These generated a total of 4,800 horsepower (3,600 kW). There were also two smaller 100 hp (75 kW) auxiliary diesel engines. Maximum speed was 14.5 knots (26.9 km/h; 16.7 mph), and range was limited by the vessels' carrying capacity of only 93 tonnes of diesel oil.

The four 254 mm (10 in) Bofors guns were massive for vessels of this size, and they could hurl a 225 kg (496 lb) shell up to 31 kilometres (19 mi). The secondary artillery consisted of eight 105 mm (4 in) dual-purpose Bofors guns in four turrets. These were the primary defense against fast torpedo boats and aircraft. Additionally, the ships were equipped with four 40 mm anti-aircraft guns (initially British-made "pom-pom" guns, which, after mediocre performance in the Winter War, were replaced with Bofors guns) and two Madsen 20 mm cannons (later increased to eight).

The purpose of the coastal defence ships was to prevent landing operations and naval blockades that threatened vital sea trade. Thanks to the construction of vast defensive systems during the czarist era, Finland had strong coastal artillery in permanent positions. These defenses were to be supplemented with minefields in times of unrest. One of the main purposes of the navy was to buy time for ground forces to deploy to the islands in the Archipelago. In these confined spaces, coastal defence ships armed with 254 mm main artillery would have been a tough opponent for any ship of the era.

The Soviet Baltic Fleet was the obvious threat, and the Finnish vessels were meant to deter the largest Soviet ships, such as the battleships Marat and Oktyabrskaya Revolutsiya, as well as the cruiser Kirov, from venturing too close to Finnish shores.

== Operational history ==
During her first years Ilmarinen made a few journeys to different ports in Finland, once running aground near Vaasa.

When the Winter War erupted, Ilmarinen and her sister ship Väinämöinen were dispatched to Åland in order to guard against a possible invasion. Due to a decree by the League of Nations, the Ålands were to be demilitarized in peacetime. The Finnish Navy was to transfer resources there when conflict arose.

The threat against the Åland Islands receded after a thick sheet-ice began covering the Baltic Sea in December 1939. The two coastal defence ships sailed to Turku where they provided anti-aircraft support for the city. They were painted white to prevent Soviet bomber crews from spotting them, but were targeted by aircraft on several occasions, resulting in one death and several injuries.

During the Continuation War the two ships shelled the Soviet base at Hanko Peninsula on five occasions in July–November 1941. Ilmarinen fired twenty shells at the Soviet airfield at Täcktom on 12 July 1941. The airfield had previously been bombed by German Junkers Ju 88s of Küstenfliegergruppe 806.

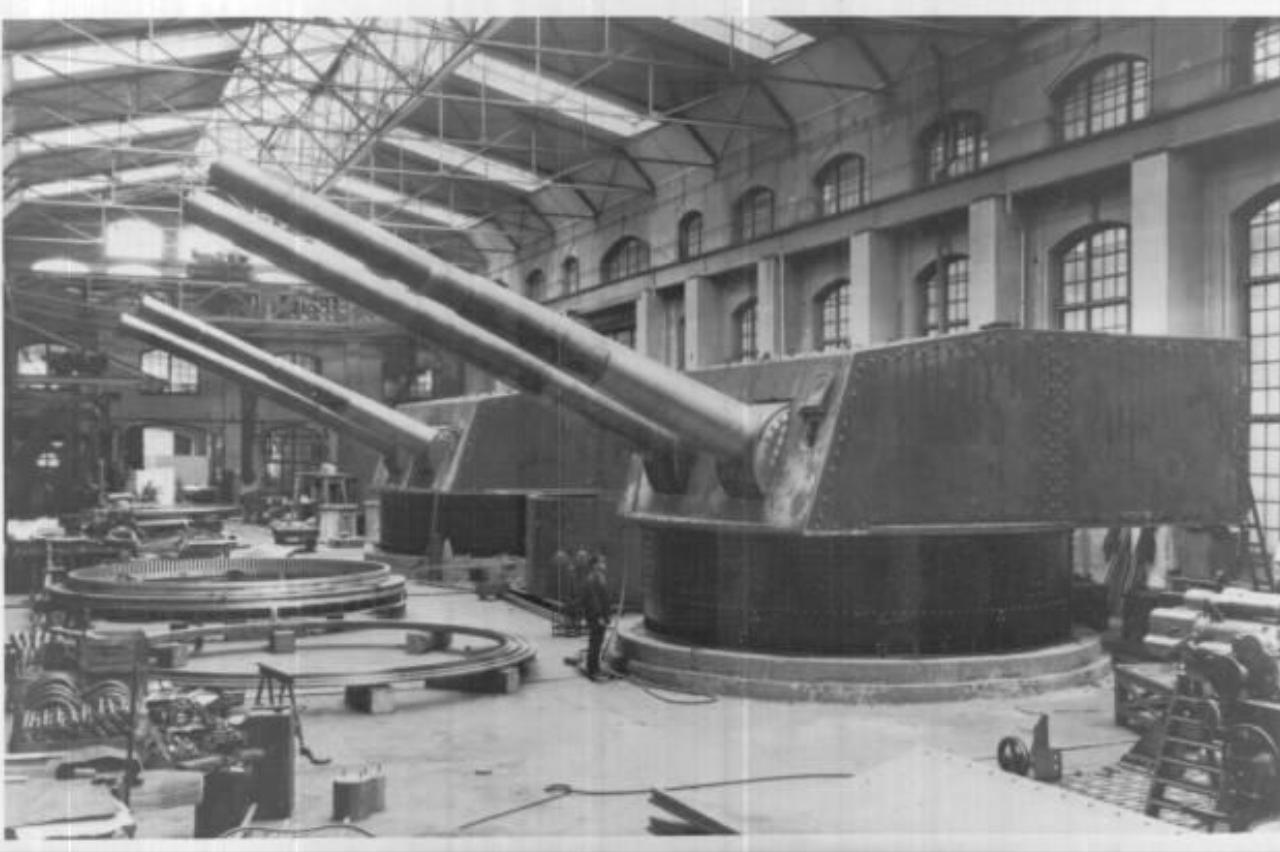
254 mm guns of a Väinämöinen-class coastal defence ship.

The two Finnish coastal defence ship participated in Operation Nordwind on 13 September 1941, in which German forces were to take the Estonian islands of Saaremaa and Hiiumaa. A group of Finnish and German ships were to be used in a diversionary operation to lure the Soviet fleet into battle – away from the real invasion force coming up from the south. Another German fleet, including the cruisers Emden, Köln, and Leipzig, waited further away to join the battle if the Soviets turned up; however, the northern fleet remained unnoticed and an order was given to turn around when they had reached a point some 25 nautical miles (46 km; 29 mi) south of Utö. The formation was led by minesweepers, but some mines had escaped being swept. The crew of Ilmarinen failed to take proper notice of the dragging paravane cable. It is likely that the ship had caught one or two sea mines in the paravane, and when the ship turned, the mines struck the bottom of the hull and exploded. The explosion blew a large hole in the ship, which soon developed a strong list and keeled over. The ship sank in just seven minutes. Only 132 men of the crew survived, and 271 were lost, most of them trapped inside the hull. Fifty-seven were rescued by the patrol boat VMV 1, which had maneuvered to the capsized hull and took on as many of Ilmarinen's crew as she could. During this time she too was at great risk of being obliterated if Ilmarinen's magazines had ignited.

The survivors were later known as Ilmarisen uimaseura (Ilmarinen's Swimming Club). Among the survivors were Ilmarinen's captain, Commander Ragnar Göransson, and the Commander of the Finnish Navy, Commodore Eero Rahola, as well as Lieutenant Viljo Revell, later a renowned architect.

The loss of Ilmarinen is the greatest single loss of the Finnish Navy to date. The military command tried to keep the loss secret, but Swedish newspapers soon reported the incident, and the numerous sailor obituaries in Finnish newspapers could also have alerted the Soviets, who soon also reported the loss.

The ship was located in 1990. It was found upside-down, deeply embedded in mud, resting at a depth of 70 metres (230 ft). It is classified as a war grave. The wreck of Estonia is some 15 km (9.3 mi) away.

== See also ==
- Väinämöinen, the sister ship of Ilmarinen
- Finnish torpedo boat S2, the second worst Finnish Navy disaster
