= Commodore (Finland) =

Rank in the Finnish Navy

Commodore (Kommodori) is a rank of Finnish Navy equal to captain in English-speaking navies being above commander (Komentaja) and below Flotilla Admiral (Lippueamiraali), equal Army rank is colonel.

During peacetime only a graduate of Finnish National Defence University can achieve the rank of commodore, and even during wartime reserve officers may achieve the rank of commodore only under anomalous circumstances.

== Other uses in Finland ==
In Finnish yacht clubs a chairman/CEO is usually called a Commodor, a tradition originating from England. While in some countries commodore is also a title held by a senior captain within a shipping company, it is not used by Finnish shipping companies.
